= Heat recovery =

Heat recovery can refer to:

- Cogeneration or combined heat and power (CHP), use of a heat engine or power station to generate electricity and useful heat at the same time
- Energy recovery, any technique or method of minimizing the input of energy to an overall system by the exchange of energy from one sub-system
- Energy recycling, process of using energy that would normally be wasted
- Exhaust heat recovery system, conversion of waste heat energy in exhaust gases into electric or mechanical energy reintroduced on the crankshaft
  - MGU-H, an electrically assisted turbocharger and electric turbo-compound used in Formula One cars from 2014 to 2025
- Goodsprings Waste Heat Recovery Station,
- Heat recovery steam generator, a heat exchanger that recovers heat from a hot gas stream
- Heat recovery ventilation or mechanical ventilation heat recovery, ventilation system that recovers energy by operating between two air sources at different temperatures to reduce heating and cooling demands of a building
- Waste heat recovery unit, an energy recovery heat exchanger that transfers heat from process outputs at high temperature to another part of the process for some purpose, usually increased efficiency
- Water heat recycling, use of a heat exchanger to recover energy and reuse heat from drain water

== See also ==
- Heat exchanger, a system used to transfer heat between a source and a working fluid
- Heat pump, device that uses energy to transfer heat from one space to another
- Heat transfer, thermal engineering discipline concerning generation, use, conversion, and exchange of thermal energy (heat) between physical systems
- Waste heat, heat produced as a byproduct of doing work
