= Gabriela Baeza =

Mexican ambiental activist and speaker

Gabriela Baeza Zamora
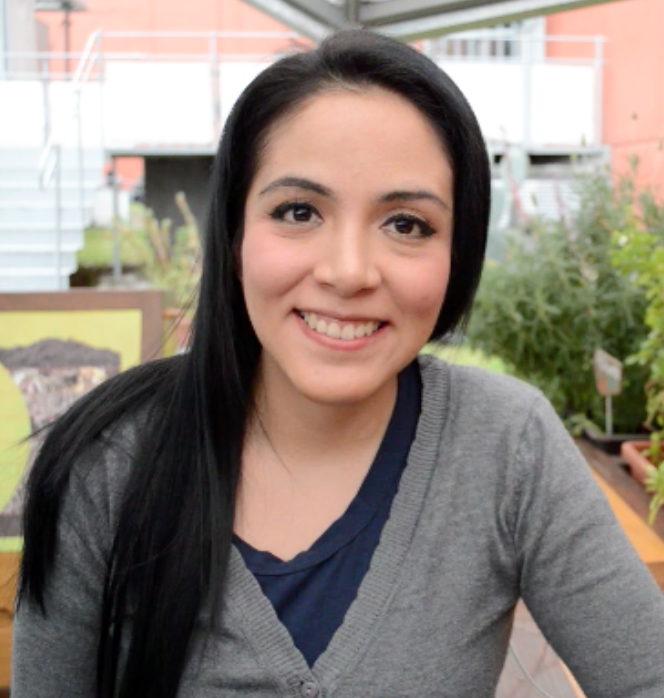
- Born: Mexico City
- Education: National Autonomous University of Mexico Utrecht University Leipzig University
- Known for: Promoting the movement 'basura cero' (zero waste) in Latin America
- Scientific career
- Fields: Sustainable development Environmental activism
- Website: proyectocerobasura.com

Gabriela Baeza Zamora is a Mexican environmental activist, speaker and expert in sustainable development, recognized for popularizing the zero waste movement in Latin America through the documentary short film El Reto which was released on July 8, 2017. Since then, Baeza has lectured at conferences in important events on environmental issues, such as the Green Expo, the Ecofest and the Circular Economy Congress of Mexico. In July 2019, the newspaper El País included her in its list of the "10 world leaders who do not give up".

== Early life and studies ==
Baeza was born in Mexico City. She studied Environmental Sciences and later did a specialization in Environmental and Ecological Economics at the National Autonomous University of Mexico UNAM. She subsequently pursued a master's degree in Sustainable Development with the Universities of Utrecht and Leipzig. During her stay in Europe she gave lectures on conservation in countries such as Austria, Serbia and Croatia.

== Career ==
After obtaining her master's degree, Baeza became professionally linked to the German Cooperation for Sustainable Development GIZ, serving as an advisor to the waste energy use program. In 2016 she began to implement in her daily life the concepts promulgated by the zero waste movement, a lifestyle that is based on the reuse of waste that is normally stored or incinerated, thus contributing to the decontamination of the planet. In 2017, Baeza achieved notoriety in his native country and in Latin America by producing and directing the documentary short film El Reto (The Challenge), in which he recounts his experience since he embraced this lifestyle. The short, made by a small local production company, had a strong impact on social networks, achieving millionaire views.

Since that time, Baeza has appeared several times in the media, where she explains the philosophy of the movement and provides advice for it to be applied effectively in homes. As a lecturer, she has participated in important environmental events such as the Mexico Circular Economy Congress, the Green Expo and the Ecofest, among others. Baeza is considered an 'influencer' in the Mexican environmental movement.

The method proposed by Baeza involves the use of glass containers and paper bags, bulk purchases, reuse and recycling. On her blog, Baeza provides advice on the subject and offers environmental awareness content.

== Filmography ==
2017 - El Reto (The Challenge) - documentary short film
