= Lauren Singer =

Environmental Activist

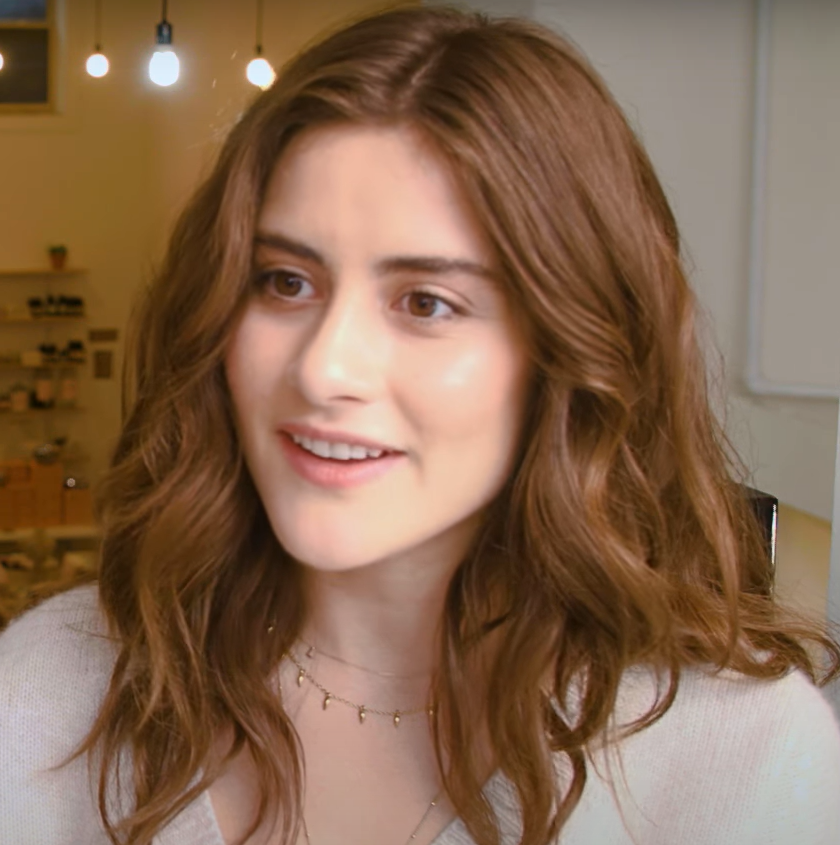
- Singer in 2017
- Born: May 4, 1991 (age 35); New York City, New York, United States
- Education: New York University
- Occupations: Environmentalist; Investor; Blogger; Entrepreneur; Environmental activist

Lauren Singer (born 4 May 1991) is an American environmental activist, entrepreneur, investor, and blogger in the zero waste movement. She is most notable for collecting the waste she has created since 2012 in a 16-ounce mason jar. Her blog, Trash Is for Tossers, documents her lifestyle. She is the founder of Package Free and The Simply Co.

== Early life and education ==
Singer was born in New York City and raised in Westchester County, New York. She is Jewish. She received an undergraduate at New York University and received degrees in environmental studies and politics in 2013. She is a managing partner at Overview Capital, a venture fund investing in businesses addressing the mitigation of methane and other short-lived climate pollutants in their earliest stages. Singer previously worked as a sustainability manager for the New York City Department of Environmental Protection, prior to founding The Simply Co. and Package Free.

== Career and activism ==
In 2012, Singer began collecting the waste she produced in a 16-ounce mason jar, detailing her zero waste life on her blog Trash Is for Tossers. She simultaneously made her own personal care products and changing her consumer behavior to divert waste from landfill and divest from industries that cause environmental pollution.

Singer left her full-time job in 2014 and launched The Simply Co., an organic laundry detergent company. Her product was sold via Kickstarter’s website and at wholesale locations across the United States.

In 2017, Singer opened Package Free as a three-month pop-up shop in Williamsburg. In 2023, Singer co-founded Overview Capital.

Lauren Singer cited Rachel Carson and Bea Johnson as the authors and activists who inspired her interest in environmental sustainability.

Singer has been named a Business Insider "woman to watch", one of InStyle’s "50 badass women changing the world", and a Well+Good "2020 changemaker".
