= Bitubale =

Baled asphalt

A Bitubale is baled asphalt, in cold form, wrapped in white plastic or in asphalt-based film. Invented by Singapore-based Eastern Petroleum Group, Bitubale is a green technology innovation for the global bitumen (asphalt) transport supply chain. Bitubales are produced in specially designed plants for cooling, dispensing, encapsulation, and packing of bitumen at its supply source. The technologies support cold-form transport of bitumen with zero waste at the end of its supply chain.

Primary benefits of the Bitubale, over hot-form transported asphalt, are halving of the CO_{2} emissions across the bitumen transport supply chain, large increases in workplace safety for bitumen/asphalt transport workers, elimination of long-term health risks from bitumen/asphalt fumes for transportation workers, elimination of accidental pollution of environmental assets during asphalt transport, and elimination of polluting bitumen-residue waste in millions of discarded drums in landfills.
