= City of Oakland's Zero Waste Program =

The City of Oakland, California, adopted a Zero Waste Strategic Plan in 2006, detailing a road map for the city to follow toward the implementation of a Zero Waste System by 2020. As stated in a City Resolution, introduced by then Mayor Jerry Brown, Zero Waste principles:

"[P]romote the highest and best use of materials to eliminate waste and pollution, emphasizing a closed-loop system of production and consumption, moving in logical increments toward the goal of zero waste through the core principles of":
1. Improving reuse/recycling of end-of-life products and materials to ensure their highest and best use;
2. Pursuing design strategies to minimize product hazards and lifestyles that limit consumption; and
3. Using waste disposal operations to improve the economy and develop the workforce.

Zero Waste systems can be traced back to chemist Paul Palmer who developed and coined the concept in the 1970s (in Oakland, CA) in order to find a way to reuse the vast amount of chemicals produced by the electronics industry. Today, cities like Oakland are adopting Zero Waste Systems to create a process that redirects all end-of-life products toward future applications in the marketplace, rather than to a landfill.

== Oakland's Zero Waste Strategic Plan ==
The city of Oakland's Zero Waste Strategic Plan set out in 2006 to reduce the annual tons of waste directed toward landfills from 400,000 tons to 40,000 annually by 2020. Chiefly, the city aimed to create comprehensive systems that transfer end-of-life products back into the economy. The city's Strategic Plan is based on five strategies that include recycling but also product and system design changes and policy revisions, as follows:

1. Expand and Improve Local and Regional Recycling and Composting
  - Greater engagement with the general public and particularly the business community is necessary, requiring the development of additional recovery services and initiatives, for example, to support businesses that utilize the Port of Oakland and produce construction and demolition materials.
2. Develop and Adopt New Rules and Incentives to Reduce Waste Disposal
  - Create stronger incentives to “reward reuse, repair, and reduced consumption” to replace the present incentive to use landfills.
3. Preserve Land for Sustainable Development and Green Industry Infrastructure
  - Expand industrial land for businesses that manufacture and make use of materials traditionally discarded. Create partnerships with StopWaste.Org, and East Bay Economic Alliance toward the development of policies that attract such businesses.
4. Advocate for Manufacturer Responsibility for Product Waste, Ban Problem Materials
  - Adopt California’s Extended Producer Responsibility (EPR) created to require businesses to assume the responsibility for any environmental impacts resulting from their products (throughout the product’s life cycle).
5. Educate, Promote and Advocate a Zero Waste Sustainability Agenda
  - Since only 15% of Oakland homes compost, and 67% of waste continues to be produced by industries, stronger, though positive, messaging about Zero Waste and sustainability should be circulated and tailored for different audiences, situations and locations.

Abiding by the system advocated by Zero Waste International Alliance, Oakland’s Zero Waste System follows “natural cycles, where all outputs are simply an input for another process.” Moreover, Zero Waste systems place the “highest priority on conserving resources and retaining their form and function without burning, burying, or otherwise destroying their form and function. “ This calls for “eliminating discharges to land, water or air that harm natural systems,” as well as, “preventing rather than managing, waste and pollution, and recommitting to the priority ordering of the waste reduction hierarchy: first reduce consumption; next, reuse what is left; and finally, recycle anything that is no longer usable and landfill any residual.”

Oakland's Zero Waste System also examines each management of goods in accordance with specific criteria, such as:

- “Customer Benefits,” such as opportunities for residents and businesses to reduce greenhouse gases and access to recycling services.
- “Economic Development,” such as the creation of jobs and the development of a range of employment opportunities within organizations that process, manufacture or sell “discards-based” businesses.
- “Financial,” such as cost to city and ratepayers, as well as pricing that incentivizes waste reduction and promotes recycling.
- “Innovation,” such as methods that allow for system upgrades and evolution over time.

== Motivations ==
In 2006, Oakland residents surpassed the state mandate of diverting 50% landfill waste from 580,000 to 400,000 tons, yet progress toward greater waste reduction was slowing down. Meanwhile, consumption of materials and products continued to grow. Widespread evidence indicated that every stage of production, transportation, use and disposal of materials and products negatively impacted ecosystems, the climate, public health and biodiversity. The quantity of toxic materials in the disposal process was increasing and Oakland was struggling to maintain cost effective waste management.

Oakland's system of waste reduction in 2006 allowed businesses to determine how their products would be designed and packaged, without regulation. This practice left the consumers and local governments to bear the burden of disposing of material goods. Zero Waste Systems, on the other hand, call for businesses to develop not only recyclable packaging and product designs, but designs that could have endless new uses and applications. The Zero Waste System, therefore, offered Oakland an ambitious strategy to address waste and inefficiencies endemic to the city's structure, economy and practices.

== Causes/sources of excess waste ==
We commonly think of waste as garbage, or refuse; anything that becomes useless or a byproduct. In other words, waste has countless physical sources. Zero Waste Alliance (2011) describes waste in this way:

"In our industrial society waste results from the inefficient use of any resource and includes activities and products that generate by-products with no clear use, no market value, or hazardous properties and by-products that decrease their potential value. Waste takes many different forms: from solid and hazardous waste to wastes in energy and material use; wastes in manufacturing and administrative activities and wastes of human resources.

When Oakland adopted its Zero Waste Strategic Plan in 2006, the actual 400,000 tons of waste consisted of the following:

Yard Trimmings	9%
Food Waste	12%
Clean Wood & Other Organics	9%
Metals	6%
Glass	1%
Plastic	5%
Paper	19%
Concrete, Asphalt, Roofing	6%
Non-recyclables	33%
	100%

Oakland categorized the source of waste by the individual or group that submitted the waste to the city for disposal in landfills, (1) Non-residential or commercial sources and (2) Residential, including single family or multi-family sources. At the time, 67% of waste was generated by non-residential sources, and residents produced 33%. Of this non-residential group, 30% was being hauled to landfills by entities over which the city had minimal control (those that haul their own garbage to the landfill), such as Caltrans, AC Transit, BART and independent contractors. Of the 400,000 tons of material transferred to landfills, 67% could be recycled using city operations already established. Regional recovery and diversion options existed in 2006 for paper, glass, metals, plastics, yard trimmings, food, clean wood, concrete, asphalt, and roofing. The City recognized that it could minimize the transfer of these materials with additional focus on improving separation of materials, messaging to businesses regarding diversion and recycling options and stronger incentives.

== Social and historical underpinnings ==
The need for incentives touches upon the social and historical forces that have led to excessive waste production. As scholars, historians, environmentalists, and even politicians have increasingly asserted, the American economic system has long prioritized economic growth over preserving the natural world. This approach has often put nature at the bottom of our hierarchy of importance. As Porritt contends in Capitalism as if the World Matters, corporations focused on growth have not been held accountable for damages they cause to the environment; which has created very little incentive for industries to concern themselves with sustainability or environmental protection. With profit and growth as the ultimate goal, businesses have sought out the cheapest resources and environments lacking regulation.

Unfortunately environmental concerns did not come to the forefront until the 1970s when Congress passed a series of pro-environment policy changes in response to a wave of environmental passion flaring across the country. Nonetheless, while policies have led to environmental progress in some areas, such as in air quality, governments have had a harder time implementing programs that regulate groundwater contaminants. Meanwhile, landfills continue to contaminate ground and drinking water around the country.

Indeed, as late as 2006, the City of Oakland offered incentives for businesses to haul garbage to a landfill, rather than consider reuse and recycling options. Additionally, Oakland recognized in 2006 that a lack of service providers for recycling and recovery efforts had prevented progress toward environmentally sustainable solutions. Also, the city had never set aside land needed for reuse and recycling business materials. In this way, incentives and the marketplace were working against the city's environmental concerns. In fact, most product consumption serves to undermine a Zero Waste Policy because of the inherent negative “externalities,” or those factors outside the market transaction, which are not accounting for in the cost of producing and consuming an item. Historically, prices for toys, watches, cars, etc., have not covered the costs associated with disposing or recycling these items. Oakland will remedy this flaw in the system by working toward shifting the responsibility of material disposal to the manufacturer instead of the government or the consumer. Further, rather than apply the tax base toward cleanup of contaminated landfills, the Zero Waste system will use the tax base to invest in recycling, composting and reuse facilities, called “Resource Recovery Parks.”

== Evolution of policy ==
Oakland's Zero Waste Policy evolved out of a series of mandates originating with the California Integrated Waste Management Act of 1989, which required every city and county in California to reduce their solid waste disposal amounts by 50% by year 2000. Soon after, in 1990, the Alameda County Waste Reduction and Recycling Initiative Charter Amendment (Measure D) mandated a 75% reduction in waste disposal countywide, allowing the Alameda County Source Reduction and Recycling Board to set a deadline for the goal. This board set 2010 as the deadline date. In 2002, the City of Oakland advocated for this goal by adopting a 75% reduction waste goal through Resolution 77500. This resolution called upon the Environmental Service Division of the City of Oakland's Public Works Agency to identify strategies to accomplish this goal. The city also amended the Oakland Municipal Code to establish requirements for construction and demolition debris waste reduction in 2002 through Ordinance #612253.

Marking another milestone in the evolution toward Zero Waste, San Francisco hosted the United Nations World Environment meeting of 2005, bringing together mayors across the country for a strategy session on waste disposal. Governor Jerry Brown's Sustainability Director at the time, Randy Hayes, played a pivotal role in Oakland's participation in the Accords and in creating momentum supporting Zero Waste systems within the Mayor's office. Brown signed the United Nations World Environment Day Urban Environmental Accords, pledging that Oakland would implement 21 action steps toward sustainability, which included a Zero Waste Goal. This accord meeting and related efforts spurred Oakland in 2006 to adopt a Zero Waste Strategic Plan, calling for 90% reduction in annual tons sent to landfills by 2020.

== Policy tools ==
What policies are aiding Oakland's in advancing toward Zero Waste? Oakland's Zero Waste Economy document, created in 2006, presents a multifaceted approach that incorporates prescriptive regulation, incentive-based or financial payments, penalties, and capacity policy tools directing the City toward a more “environmentally and economically sustainable system where resources are kept in the production cycle”, as described below.

Prescriptive regulations or those that mandate actions allowed by law, also known as “command and control regulation”:

- Ban toxic products from landfills or incinerators.
- Prohibit sale of “unnecessarily toxic or polluting products.”

Financial Penalties, or those tools designed to mitigate environmental harm by charging the offending party taxes or fees:

- Require that the manufacturer be held financially responsible for the product's end-cycle.

Incentive-based actions or financial payment encourage behavior by subsidizing certain actions or methods:

- Build incentives for product designers to develop packaging with the use of non-toxic materials and opt for designs that promote reuse, recycle, or composting.
- Create incentives for businesses to abide by environmental and worker protection standards, rather than choose the least expensive production methods and hiring workers outside the United States.
- Establish financial incentives for businesses and residents to recycle more and create less waste. (Federal tax subsidies at the time provided financial incentives to industries that make products from virgin materials).
- Build incentives for consumers to voice their interest in non-toxic, reusable, and recyclable products by only purchasing items that meet these standards.

Persuasion techniques offer soft approaches urging behavior to change by distributing or publicizing information about the environmental issue.

- Require distributors and retailers to become education centers to inform consumers about proper disposal and work with manufacturers to build reusable packaging and crates and reduce any packaging where possible.

== Status in 2011 ==
Oakland is no longer measuring progress in terms of diversion rates, which allows credits for recycling, population and economic factors, but evaluates waste reduction more ambitiously, in terms of total disposal tonnage. The 90% reduction rate it seeks by 2020 will require Oakland to double the waste reduction it had achieved over the past 15 years. After 2002, when the City adopted the 75% reduction rate goal, Oakland's Public Works Agency realized that the systems that enabled Oakland to reach a 50% reduction rate would not be sufficient for Oakland to reach a 75% reduction rate. Hence, improving the systems has been a primary focus since 2006, which are outlined in Strategies #2 and #4 of the Strategic Plan. These strategies aim to build an end to incentives to continue disposing in landfills, instead calling for manufacturers to take responsibility for the products and their materials through the entire duration of product life cycles.

One third of the materials that were winding up at city landfills in 2002 did not have recovery possibilities, leaving landfills as the only option. Much of this had to do with factors outside of the city's control, for reaching the 75% reduction rate would require changes at the state and/or federal level where manufacturing decisions are made. In fact, within the Zero Waste Strategic Plan, strategies 4 and 5 largely depend on behaviors and regulations outside municipal boundaries.

This realization led the City toward a stronger advocacy role, beginning when Jerry Brown was governor in 2002. Since that time, Oakland has been working with numerous regulatory and implementing agencies to advance legislation favoring system changes that allow for a Zero Waste goal to be achieved, including (to name a few):

- The Association of Bay Area Governments
- East Bay Development Alliance
- Californians Against Waste
- Berkeley Ecology Center
- Product Policy Institute
- National Recycling Coalition
- Greenaction for Heath and Environmental Justice

Oakland also worked in a national group to develop a Zero Waste Toolkit designed to aid governments in implementing an Energy & Climate Action Plan (ECAP) for the reduction of greenhouse gases through materials management.

Moreover, while advocating for systemic changes at the state and regional level, the City recognized a need for assistance in implementing system changes at the local level. In 2009, Oakland's Public Works Agency entered into contract with R3 Consulting for support with system analysis, planning and implementation of Oakland's Zero Waste Strategic Plan. R3 Consulting was chosen as the most highly experienced agency in system design for municipal governments, having formerly completed projects with the Cities of Dublin, San Jose, Sacramento, and Los Angeles, as well as with StopWaste.org. R3's work plan was split into two phases with an estimated project end date in 2011, including:

- Phase 1—Assessing and testing models and Zero Waste system designs to identify best options.
- Phase 2—Implement selected system design options by supporting City staff in building work plans for “collection, processing, transfer, and disposal of discarded products and materials.”

The City of Oakland's Public Works Agency is named as the primary administrator of the program. According to Oakland's Public Works Agency Web site (April, 2011), Oakland has steadily advanced its progress toward Zero Waste in recent years. Residents have reduced their landfill disposal by 27% since 2000, down to approximately 100,000 tons, bringing the City markedly closer to its goal of minimizing waste to 40,000 tons.

Oakland residents have played an important role in moving the city toward Zero Waste. Indeed, the “empowered consumer” is critical in the Zero Waste Economy. In our society, all systems circle back to money and sales (Gore, 2006). Using their buying-power, consumers can tell industries that products must be non-toxic, reusable, recyclable or compostable or they will stay on the shelf. Following this directive, manufacturers and products designers will ultimately have no choice but to create or distribute sustainable products that drive the economy toward a paradigm that views production cycles as they do in nature, where “waste” is repurposed in the cycle of life.

== See also ==
- City of Oakland Energy and Climate Action Plan
