= Precycling =

Buying products that lead to less waste

Precycling is the practice of reducing waste by attempting to avoid buying items which will generate waste into households or businesses. The U.S. Environmental Protection Agency (EPA) states that precycling is the preferred method of integrated solid waste management because it cuts waste at its source and therefore eliminates trash before it is created. According to the EPA, precycling is also characterized as a decision-making process for the consumer because it involves making informed judgments regarding a product's waste implications. The factors taken into consideration by the consumer include whether a product is reusable, durable, or repairable; made from renewable or non-renewable resources; overpackaged; and whether or not the container is reusable.

== About ==
Precycling has the ability to build industrial, social, environmental, and economic circumstances that allow for old products to be converted into new resources

- Industrial: increasing the independence from accumulative substances, such as heavy metals, fossil fuels, synthetics, etc.
- Economic: create a circular economy
- Ecological/environmental: allowance for more extensive and diverse natural habitats where the resources are returned to nature
- Societal: extend the capacity of precycling to meet everyone's needs

The concept of ‘precycling’ was coined in 1988 by social marketing executive Maureen O’Rorke in a public waste education campaign for the City of Berkeley. The application of precycling is not limited to large corporations, but can be administered on smaller scales in local communities. The reason precycling is effective on large scales and on small scales stems from the idea that it shares a common language between experts and non-experts, buyers and sellers, economists and environmentalists. However, it is important to consider that waste prevention systems, such as precycling, require the collaborative effort from several working parts. These parts include prevention targets, producer responsibility, householder charging, funding for pilot projects, public involvement, engagement of private and third sectors, and public campaigns that spread awareness.

== Integration of waste management ==
The original three-pronged push for waste management is "Reduce, Reuse, Recycle." Precycling emphasizes "reducing and reusing", while harnessing and questioning the momentum and popularity of the term "recycle." In addition to this strategy, precycling incorporates four supplementary R's: Repair, Recondition, Remanufacture and Refuse. Waste is a resource that can be reused, recycled, recovered, or treated. Precycling differs from other singular forms of waste prevention because it encompasses not one behavior, but many.

=== Reduce ===
Reduce is a form of precycling that allows for the preservation of natural resources and also saves money on behalf of the manufacturer, the consumer, and the waste manager. Moreover, effective source reduction slows the depletion of environmental resources, prolongs the life of waste management facilities, and makes combustion and landfills safer by removing toxic waste components.

=== Reuse ===
Reuse is a form of precycling that reinvents items after their initial life and avoids creating additional waste.

=== Recycle ===
Although precycling harnesses the familiarity of the term recycling, it is still important to note the difference between recycling and prevention. Since precycling focuses on the prevention of waste production, this entails that measures are taken before a substance, material, or product has become waste. Whereas recycling is a type of precycling that involves taking action before existing waste is abandoned to nature. Recycling is a process where discarded materials are collected, sorted, processed, and used in the production of new products. Every time a person engages in the act of recycling, they help increase the market and bring the cost down. However, current research from the American Plastics Council states that only 25% of the nation's recycling capabilities are being utilized.

Traditionally recycling requires large amounts of energy to "melt down" and then re-manufacture items. While this may cut down on the amount of trash that is going into landfills, it is not sustainable unless the underlying energy supply is sustainable. In addition, recycling often means downcycling and always involves at least some loss of the original material, so primary extraction is still required to make up the difference. Precycling reduces these problems by using less material in the first place, so less has to be recycled.

=== Repairing ===
Repair is a type of precycling that corrects specified faults in a product, however the quality of a repaired product is inferior to reconditioned or remanufactured items. One survey found that 68% of the respondents believed repairing was not cost efficient and sought alternative methods such as reconditioning or remanufacturing.

=== Reconditioning ===
Reconditioning is a type of precycling that requires the rebuilding of major components to restore a product's working condition, which is expected to be inferior to the original product.

=== Remanufacturing ===
Remanufacturing is another type of precycling that involves the greatest degree of work content, which results in superior quality of the product. In order to remanufacture a product, it requires a total dismantling of the product and the subsequent restoration and replacement of its parts. Remanufacturing is a preferred method of waste reduction compared to repairing and reconditioning because it preserves the embodied energy that has been used to shape the components of a product for their first life and it only requires 20-25% of the initial energy used in formation.

=== Refuse ===
Refusal to buy certain products due to detrimental impacts on the environment or wasteful packaging is another type of precycling because the rejection of such items paves the way for products that can be reduced, reused, or recycled.

== Zero-waste strategy ==
A zero waste approach aims to prevent rather than just reduce accumulated waste. Zero-waste goes beyond recycling to include the whole system, which includes the flow of resources and waste through human society. This “design principle” works to maximize recycling, minimize waste, reduce consumption and ensures that products are reused, repaired or recycled back into nature or the market. This preventative approach is more manageable and effective than incremental approaches that focus on gradually reducing the amount of impact because it is less complex and contains less information, which permits wider public participation.

=== Sustainability ===
In regards to sustainability, the term itself is often associated with resource constraints and maintenance of the status quo rather than growth and prosperity. However, with the implementation of a zero-waste management strategy, sustainable practices can push the status quo in order to create a society that is capable of development, technically and culturally advanced, dynamic in population and production, thoughtful with the use of non-renewable resources, and diverse, democratic, and challenging.

=== Economic effects ===
Increased waste production is often negatively associated with increased economic growth. However, a zero-waste management strategy allows for economic growth that works cohesively with sustainability rather than against it. The implementation of a zero-waste strategy is part of an economic goal-set that aims to create a circular economy. A circular economy refers to a closed-loop socio-economic system that focuses on minimizing wastes while simultaneously maximizing stocks of resources for the economy. This closed-loop design diverts linear (open-loop) waste disposal streams into new raw material streams.

In a circular economy, one way to minimize waste is through the employment of precycling insurance, which allows for a full range of financed waste prevention opportunities. This type of insurance would set premiums related to the risk of a product ending up as waste, and these premiums would serve to fund actions concerning waste prevention. When establishing a premium for precycling insurance several factors need to calculated: recyclability or biodegradability; provision of infrastructure, habitat or collaborations for the generation of the product from new resources; the ecosystem concentrations of product components above natural levels. The idea of precycling insurance is plausible considering the aim of insurance industries is to avoid losses rather than paying for losses. However, in order for this idea to work, private and third sectors need to be involved and engaged in the issue. In this instance, a third sector refers to small charities and a handful of societal enterprises that coordinate with charity shops.

=== Environmental effects ===
According to the “Extended Producer Responsibility” principle, impacts are substantially determined at the point of design where key decisions are made on materials, production process, and how products are used and disposed of at the end of life-cycle, which falls on the producer. However, in a circular economy there is the recognition that nature's capacity needs to be maximized through the reprocess of biodegradable wastes produced by industries and human activity. This task is accomplished through the procurement and funding of precycling insurance premiums that invest in systematic preservation of endangered habitats, careful harvesting of biological resources and expansions of productive ecosystems. Additionally, in terms of climate change, precycling insurance offers a flexible alternative to the binding limits on greenhouse gas emissions and international taxation on mineral fuels. In terms of waste management systems, the environment benefits from the reparation of products to the greatest degree because less energy is required and the majority of the original material is kept intact.

=== Societal effects ===
The social structure operating under a circular economy is referred to as a circular society. The aim of a circular society is to create a cooperative culture by means of problem-prevention, resource-availability and fuller participation, with reference to precycling. One critique of this approach, in terms of waste management, is that it is difficult to maintain a cooperative culture within a society because it is constantly evolving and changing.

== Raising awareness ==
There is an increasing public awareness on the need for sustainable production and consumption. One campaign that aimed at raising awareness of precycling focused on whether people's self-reported behaviors were affected by exposure to precycling advertisements on the radio, television, or in-store flyers. The researchers concluded that the most effective results stemmed from the inclusion of social rewards that invoke an intrinsic motivation to engage in precycling behaviors.

Another way to raise awareness is through statistics that highlight the potential impacts that can be achieved through waste prevention. For instance, if 70 million Americans bought a half-gallon plastic-coated carton container of milk each week (instead of two quarts), then 41.6 million pounds of paper discards and 5.7 pounds of plastic discards would be reduced annually. This transition from two quarts to a half-gallon would save $145.6 million on packaging each year.

== Implementation ==
In order to effectively implement precycling practices and behaviors, the public needs to feel "enabled", "engaged", "encouraged", and "exemplified" in their efforts to partake in precycling.

Not only can the average consumer practice precycling, but industries can also participate. Purchasing from parts suppliers, reuse of chemicals, and reduction of unnecessary packaging are some methods. There are some companies and countries that have taken it upon themselves to implement more sustainable practices that align with precycling principles. For instance, Fonterra reduced its packaging through the implementation of bulking, reuse and redesign. Further, Waste Management New Zealand created Recycle New Zealand, which provided a subsidiary focusing on the collection of materials that could be diverted and sorted prior to the operations of reducing, recycling, or recovering. Moving forward, free-trade organizations can further implement precycling practices by exploring this strategy as a new way to reduce regulations and to promote greater industrial freedom of choice.

Moreover, the individual consumer can develop precycling habits by engaging in the following practices and behaviors:

=== "Enviro-shopping" ===
Enviro-shopping is considered shopping with the environment and implements a precycling strategy:

- Bringing one's own grocery bag or bring old ones back to the store
- Buying packages with the least amount of packaging
- Buying in bulk, but not buying more than one will use
- Looking for products with reusable dishes

=== Product selection ===
Products to choose from in accordance with precycling principles:

- Plastic milk jugs or glass milk containers (no cartons)
- Fresh fruit and vegetables
- Concentrated products that involves less packaging
- Recycled products
- Rechargeable batteries

=== Behaviors ===
In addition to shopping practices that implement precycling principles, there are also behaviors that can be undertaken to prevent waste:

- Home composting
- Avoid junk mail
- Buy second-hand
- One way to participate in precycling is to carry a "precycling kit". Include a Tupperware or non-disposable container, silverware set, a cloth napkin or handkerchief, and a thermos or water-bottle within a cloth bag that can double as a grocery/shopping bag.
