= Energy recovery =

Extracting energy from exhaust or waste

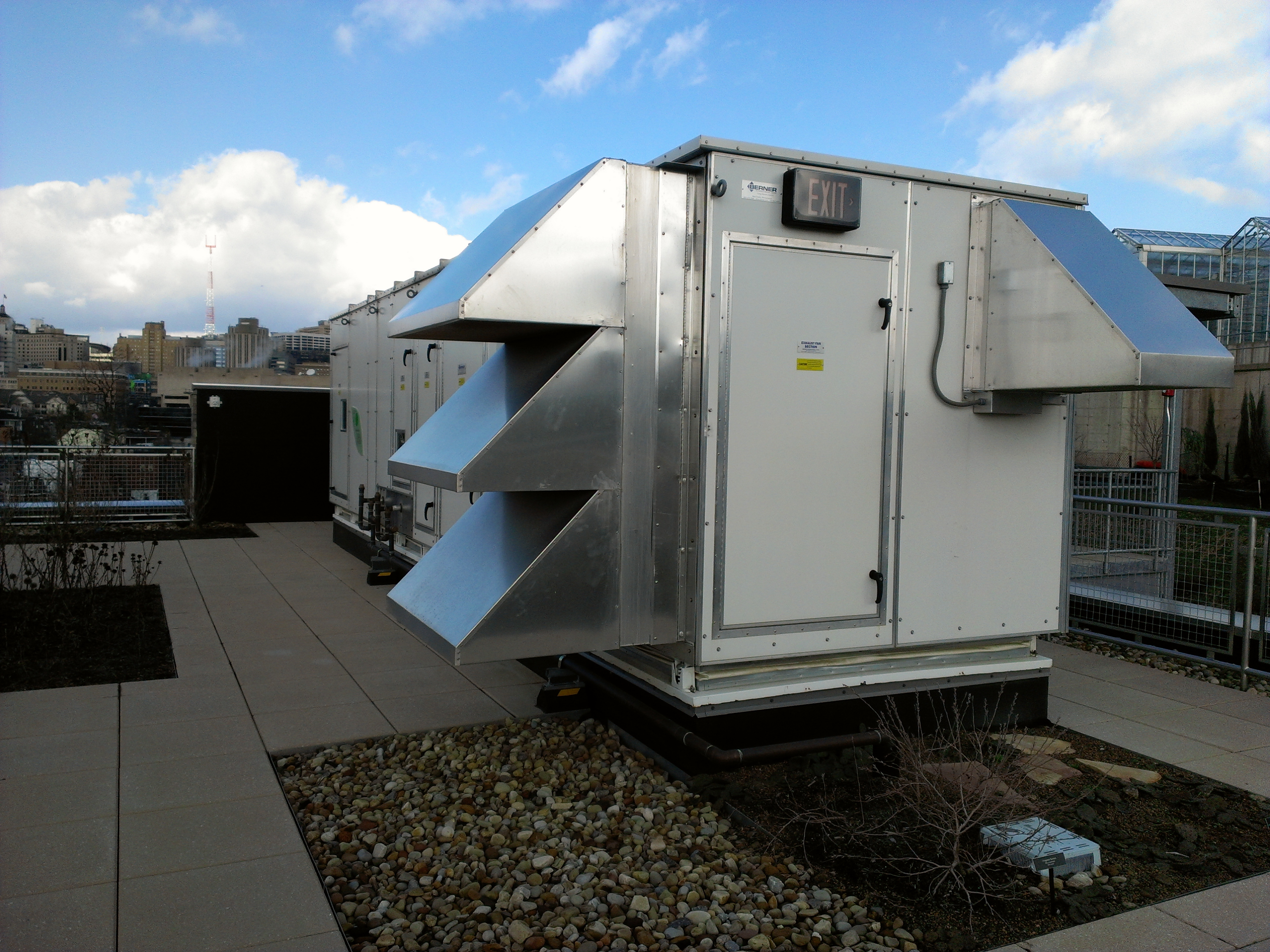
Berner Tricoil Energy Recovery System atop the Center for Sustainable Landscapes in Pittsburgh, Pennsylvania.

Energy recovery includes any technique or method of minimizing the input of energy to an overall system by the exchange of energy from one sub-system of the overall system with another. The energy can be in any form in either subsystem, but most energy recovery systems exchange thermal energy in either sensible or latent form.

In some circumstances the use of an enabling technology, either daily thermal energy storage or seasonal thermal energy storage (STES, which allows heat or cold storage between opposing seasons), is necessary to make energy recovery practicable. One example is waste heat from air conditioning machinery stored in a buffer tank to aid in night time heating.

A common application of this principle is in systems which have an exhaust stream or waste stream which is transferred from the system to its surroundings. Some of the energy in that flow of material (often gaseous or liquid) may be transferred to the make-up or input material flow. This input mass flow often comes from the system's surroundings, which, being at ambient conditions, are at a lower temperature than the waste stream. This temperature differential allows heat transfer and thus energy transfer, or in this case, recovery. Thermal energy is often recovered from liquid or gaseous waste streams to fresh make-up air and water intakes in buildings, such as for the HVAC systems, or process systems.

== Examples ==
- Heat recovery is implemented in heat sources like e.g. a steel mill. Heated cooling water from the process is sold for heating of homes, shops and offices in the surrounding area.
- Regenerative braking is used in electric cars, trains, heavy cranes etc. where the energy consumed when elevating the potential is returned to the electric supplier when released.
- Cyclone Waste Heat Engine

=== Electric Turbo Compound (ETC) ===
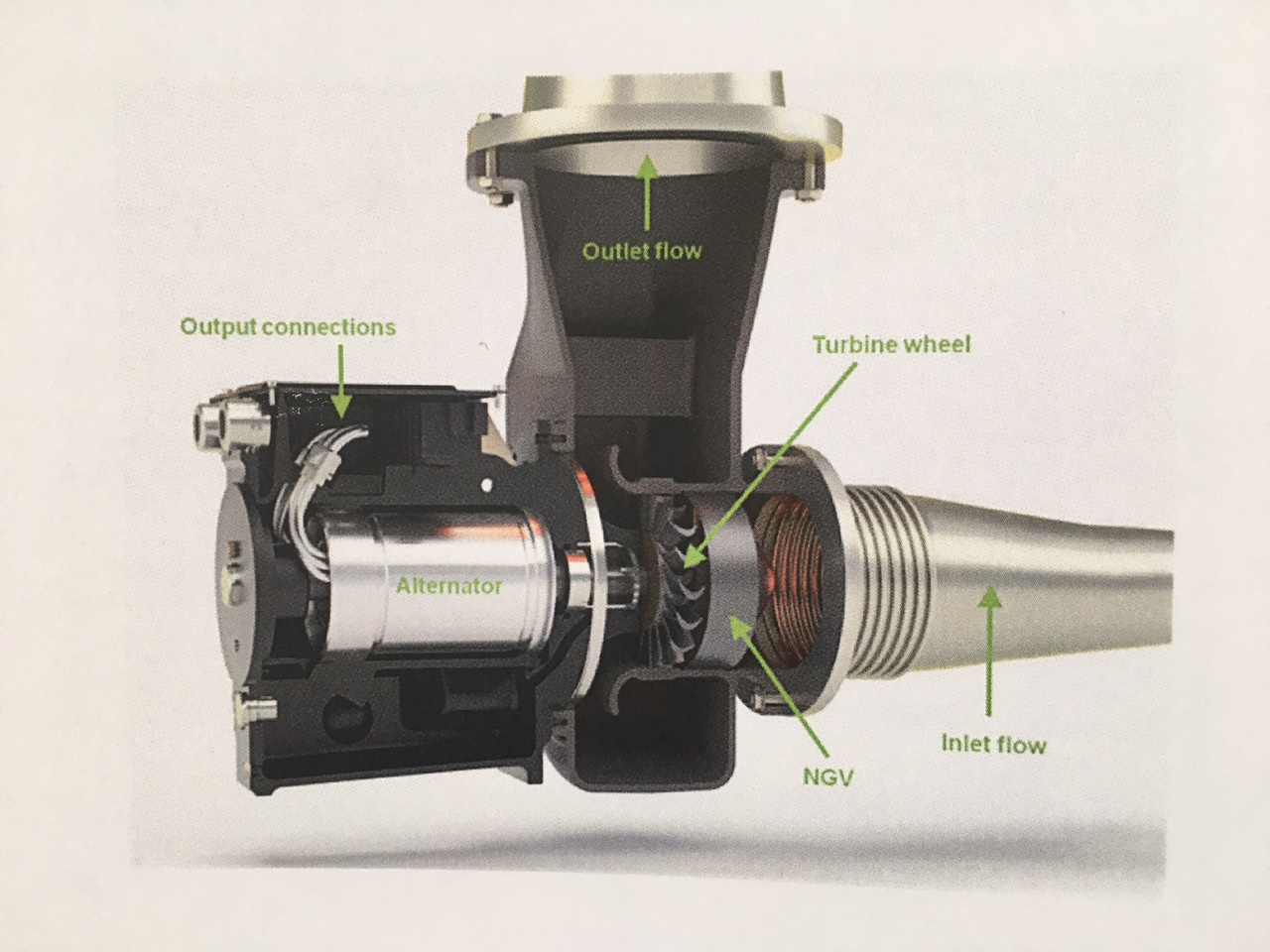
Electric Turbo Compound (ETC) cross section.

Electric Turbo Compounding (ETC) is a technology solution to the challenge of improving the fuel efficiency of gas and diesel engines by recovering waste energy from the exhaust gases.

=== STES ===
- At a foundry in Sweden waste heat is recovered and stored in a large mass of native bedrock which is penetrated by a cluster of 140 heat exchanger equipped boreholes (155mm diameter) that are 150m deep. This store is used for heating an adjacent factory as needed, even months later.
- The Drake Landing Solar Community in Alberta, Canada uses STES to recover and utilize natural heat that otherwise would be wasted. The community uses a cluster of boreholes in bedrock for interseasonal heat storage, and this enables obtaining 97 percent of the year-round space heating from solar thermal collectors on the garage roofs.
- Cold winter temperatures can be recovered by circulating water through a dry cooling tower and using that to chill a deep aquifer or borehole cluster. The chill is later recovered from the storage for summer air conditioning. With a coefficient of performance (COP) of 20 to 40, this method of cooling can be ten times more efficient than conventional air conditioning.

== Environmental impact ==
In 2008 Tom Casten, chairman of Recycled Energy Development, said that "We think we could make about 19 to 20 percent of U.S. electricity with heat that is currently thrown away by industry."

A 2007 Department of Energy study found the potential for 135,000 megawatts of combined heat and power (which uses energy recovery) in the U.S., and a Lawrence Berkeley National Laboratory study identified about 64,000 megawatts that could be obtained from industrial waste energy, not counting CHP. These studies suggest that about 200,000 megawatts, or 20%, of total power capacity could come from energy recycling in the U.S. Widespread use of energy recycling could therefore reduce global warming emissions by an estimated 20 percent. Indeed, as of 2005, about 42% of U.S. greenhouse gas pollution came from the production of electricity and 27% from the production of heat.

It is difficult to quantify the environmental impact of a global energy recovery implementation in some sectors. The main impediments are:

- Lack of efficient technologies for private homes. Heat recovery systems in private homes can have an efficiency as low as 30% or less. It may be more realistic to use energy conservation like thermal insulation or improved buildings. Many areas are more dependent on forced cooling and a system for extracting heat from dwellings to be used for other uses are not widely available.
- Ineffective infrastructure. Heat recovery in particular need a short distance from producer to consumer to be viable. A solution may be to move a large consumer to the vicinity of the producer. This may have other complications.
- Transport sector is not ready. With the transport sector using about 20% of the energy supply, most of the energy is spent on overcoming gravity and friction. Electric cars with regenerative braking seem to be the best candidate for energy recovery. Wind systems on ships are under development. Very little work on the airline industry is known in this field.

== See also ==
- DWEER
- Efficient energy use
- Energy conservation
- Energy law
- Energy policy
- Energy recovery ventilation
- Energy recycling
- Water heat recycling
- Heat recovery ventilation
- Heat recovery steam generator
- List of energy storage projects
- Mechanical vapor recompression
- Pinch analysis
- Waste-to-energy
- Hydrogen turboexpander-generator
- Thermal diode
- Thermal oxidizer
- Thermoelectric Modules
- Waste heat recovery units
