= Sean Casten =

American politician (born 1971)

- Official portrait, 2025

Member of the U.S. House of Representatives from Illinois's 6th district
- Incumbent
- Assumed office January 3, 2019
- Preceded by: Peter Roskam

Personal details
- Born: Sean Thomas Casten; November 23, 1971 (age 54) Dublin, Ireland
- Party: Democratic
- Spouse: Kara (m. 2000)
- Children: 2 (1 deceased)
- Relatives: Tom Casten (father)
- Education: Middlebury College (BA); Dartmouth College (MS, MEng)
- Website: House website Campaign website

Sean Thomas Casten (born November 23, 1971) is an American businessman and politician serving as the U.S. representative for Illinois's 6th congressional district since 2019. The district covers southwestern Chicago, as well as many of Chicago's inner southwestern suburbs, such as Downers Grove, Wheaton, Lisle, Orland Park, and Western Springs. He is a member of the Democratic Party.

Due to redistricting as a result of the 2020 United States census, Casten and fellow Democrat Marie Newman competed to represent the same district in the 2022 Democratic primary election. Casten defeated Newman in the primary election on June 28, 2022. He won the general election, defeating the Republican nominee, Orland Park mayor Keith Pekau, on November 8, 2022.

== Early life and education ==
Born in Dublin, Ireland, to American parents, Judy and Tom Casten, and raised in Hartsdale, New York, Casten earned a Bachelor of Arts in molecular biology and biochemistry from Middlebury College in 1993. He then worked for two years as a scientist at the Tufts University School of Medicine. In 1998, he earned a Master of Engineering Management and a Master of Science in biochemical engineering from the Thayer School of Engineering at Dartmouth College.

== Business career ==
Casten began his career working at consultancy Arthur D. Little, where he did fuel chain analyses for the company's chemical engineering group. From 2000 to 2007, he served as the president and CEO of Turbosteam Corporation, which converted emissions from power plants into energy.

In 2007, Casten and his father, Tom Casten, founded Recycled Energy Development (RED). RED focused on recycling wasted energy and converting energy facilities to cleaner, more economic uses. RED attempted to make profitable use of waste heat capturing technology, an avenue of electricity generation that attracted interest from a number of startup companies looking to find a "breakthrough" in the technology. In 2015, an investor in RED sued the company, alleging mismanagement by Casten. Casten settled the lawsuit and sold the company in 2016; he said the allegations against him were untrue and were part of a hostile takeover attempt.

Casten was a founding chairman of the Northeast CHP Initiative. He participated in crafting the bill that became the Regional Greenhouse Gas Initiative (RGGI), a program in the northeast United States that attempts to use market forces to reduce greenhouse gas emissions.

== U.S. House of Representatives ==
=== Elections ===
==== 2018 ====
Casten announced his candidacy for the United States House of Representatives in Illinois's 6th congressional district in September 2017. He defeated six other contenders in the 2018 Democratic primary to become the party's nominee against six-term incumbent Republican Peter Roskam.

On November 6, 2018, Casten won the election, defeating Roskam by a margin of seven points.

This race was viewed as one that Democrats needed to win in order to regain control of the U.S. House of Representatives for the first time since the 2010 elections. Illinois's 6th congressional district supported Democratic presidential nominee Hillary Clinton by about 7 percentage points in the 2016 presidential election. This was one of 25 GOP-held seats in the U.S. Representatives that Clinton carried in 2016; Democrats flipped 22 of them in 2018.

==== 2020 ====
Casten was reelected in 2020, defeating former state legislator and gubernatorial primary candidate Jeanne Ives by seven points.

==== 2022 ====
For his first two terms, Casten represented a district covering parts of five counties in Chicago's western suburbs, including Wheaton, Palatine, and Barrington.

Redistricting after the 2020 census saw the 6th become significantly more compact. Casten lost all of his territory outside Cook and DuPage counties. To make up for the loss in population, the district was pushed further into Cook County, absorbing a slice of southwestern Chicago proper. As a result, it lost its connection to longtime Republican Congressman Henry Hyde, who held the seat from 1975 to 2007.

The reconfigured district included a large chunk of the old 3rd district, represented by fellow Democrat Marie Newman. Although the reconfigured district retained Casten's district number, it was geographically more Newman's district than Casten's. According to calculations by Daily Kos, the new district was over 77% new to him; Newman retained 41% of her constituents while Casten retained 23% of his former territory. Nevertheless, Casten won the nomination. In the general election, he defeated Orland Park Mayor Keith Pekau by 8 points.

==== 2024 ====
Casten defeated Mahnoor Ahmad, public health policy director in the primary, and Republican Niki Conforti in the general election.

==== 2026 ====
On March 17th, 2026, Casten defeated Joseph Ruzevich in the primary.

=== Tenure ===
As of January 2023, Casten had voted in line with President Joe Biden's stated position 99% of the time during the 117th Congress.

=== Committee assignments ===
For the 119th Congress:

- Committee on Financial Services
  - Subcommittee on Capital Markets
  - Subcommittee on Financial Institutions
  - Subcommittee on National Security, Illicit Finance, and International Financial Institutions
- Joint Economic Committee

=== Caucus memberships ===
- Congressional Equality Caucus
- Black Maternal Health Caucus
- New Democrat Coalition
- Congressional Freethought Caucus
- Congressional Ukraine Caucus
- House Pro-Choice Caucus
- Sustainable Investment Caucus (co-chair)
- New Democrat Coalition's Climate Change Task Force (Vice-Chair)
- Rare Disease Caucus
- Sustainable Energy and Environment Coalition (Vice-Chair)

== Political positions ==
=== 2024 presidential nominee ===
On July 19, 2024, Casten called for Joe Biden to withdraw from the 2024 United States presidential election.

=== Abortion ===
Casten is an outspoken supporter of abortion rights. Following the Dobbs v. Jackson Women's Health Organization decision, Casten voted for H.R.8296, the Women's Health Protection Act of 2022, which would protect a person's ability to end a pregnancy and a healthcare provider's ability to provide abortion services.

=== Climate change and energy ===
Casten says his number one issue in Congress is energy policy and climate change. He is a member of the House Select Committee on the Climate Crisis. Of working with Congress on clean energy policy, Casten has said, "[T]he folks who really understand the energy system tend to be Republicans, and the folks who really understand environmental science tend to be Democrats. And there's a gap in talking to each other". "We have a PhD-level problem. And Congress is at a 6th-grade reading level", he has said.

Casten has introduced several bills related to energy policy, among them the Climate Risk Disclosure Act and the End Oil and Gas Subsidies Act. The Clean Industrial Technology Act of 2019 would have established a program to incentivize innovation in greenhouse gas emissions from manufacturing.

==== FERC ====
Casten has worked to increase the visibility of the Federal Energy Regulatory Commission (FERC), a federal agency with regulatory powers in the energy sector. In Congress, Casten has led efforts to "turbocharge FERC's profile" and to utilize the agency to promote the clean energy transition.

In 2021, Casten debuted a "Hot FERC Summer" campaign, a play on the phrase "hot girl summer" that rose to viral popularity in 2019. In 2022, Casten reworded the lyrics to Rihanna's 2016 single Work on the House floor to advocate for giving increased resources to FERC to allow it to "work".

=== Election reform ===
In the 118th Congress Casten co-sponsored three bills to restructure Congress and the judicial branches of the U.S. government to make them more representative:

- The Equal Voices Act would periodically adjust the number of Representatives in the House of Representatives so that each Congressional District would be computed by the population of the least populated state. Using the 2020 census, there would have been 138 more Representatives than present, each representing a district roughly the population of Wyoming.
- The Senate Reform constitutional amendment would add 12 new Senators elected at-large by ranked-choice voting from the entire electorate (including non-states such as District of Columbia). It would also add 12 presidential electors who would be pledged to vote according to the national popular vote.
- The Restoring Judicial Separation of Powers Act would restructure the federal courts and appeals process to make it more difficult for one party to game the system by stacking the courts.

Casten voted for Ayanna Pressley's amendment to H.R. 1, the Voting Rights Act, which would lower the voting age to 16.

=== Foreign policy ===
==== Israel and Palestine ====
Casten voted for a resolution in support of Israel following the 2023 Hamas attack on Israel.

In March 2024, Casten criticized Israeli prime minister Benjamin Netanyahu for the "utter disregard for Palestinian lives". In February 2026, he filed the Ceasefire Compliance Act, which would direct the government to conduct reports ensuring that Israel was complying with the Gaza war ceasefire deal and prevent the sale or transfer of offensive weapons to Israel if violations were found.

==== Syria ====
In 2023, Casten voted against H.Con.Res. 21 which directed President Joe Biden to remove U.S. troops from Syria within 180 days.

=== Reparations ===
Casten is a sponsor of the Commission to Study and Develop Reparation Proposals for African-Americans Act. The bill would allow history books to go into more depth on African American struggles and set up a reparations commission for those with enslaved ancestors.

== Electoral history ==
Illinois 6th Congressional District Democratic Primary, 2018
Party	Candidate	Votes	%
Democratic	Sean Casten	19,774	29.51
Democratic	Kelly Mazeski	17,984	26.84
Democratic	Carole Cheney	11,663	17.40
Democratic	Amanda Howland	8,483	12.66
Democratic	Becky Anderson Wilkins	4,001	5.97
Democratic	Jennifer Zordani	2,743	4.09
Democratic	Ryan Huffman	2,365	3.53
Total votes		67,013	100.0

Illinois 6th Congressional District General Election, 2018
Party	Candidate	Votes	%
Democratic	Sean Casten	169,001	53.58
Republican	Peter J. Roskam (incumbent)	146,445	46.42
Total votes		315,446	100.0

Illinois 6th Congressional District Democratic Primary, 2020
Party	Candidate	Votes	%
Democratic	Sean Casten (incumbent)	82,909	100.00
Total votes		82,909	100.00

Illinois 6th Congressional District General Election, 2020
Party	Candidate	Votes	%
Democratic	Sean Casten (incumbent)	213,777	52.82
Republican	Jeanne Ives	183,891	45.43
Libertarian	Bill Redpath	7,079	1.75
Total votes		404,747	100.00

Illinois 6th Congressional District Democratic Primary, 2022
Party	Candidate	Votes	%
Democratic	Sean Casten (incumbent)	45,654	67.7
Democratic	Marie Newman (incumbent)	19,726	29.2
Democratic	Charles M. Hughes	2,085	3.1
Total votes		67,465	100.00

Illinois 6th Congressional District General Election, 2022
Party	Candidate	Votes	%
Democratic	Sean Casten (incumbent)	150,496	54.4
Republican	Keith Pekau	126,351	45.6
Write-in		12	0.0
Total votes		276,859	100.00

Illinois 6th Congressional District General Election, 2024
Party	Candidate	Votes	%
Democratic	Sean Casten (incumbent)	196,647	54.2
Republican	Niki Conforti	166,116	45.8
Write-in		86	0.0
Total votes		362,849	100.0

== Personal life ==
Casten and his wife, Kara, live in Downers Grove, Illinois.

On June 13, 2022, Casten's daughter Gwen died suddenly at the age of 17 from cardiac arrest. According to Casten, his daughter had been in good health.

U.S. House of Representatives
Preceded by Peter Roskam	Member of the U.S. House of Representatives from Illinois's 6th congressional district 2019–present	Incumbent
U.S. order of precedence (ceremonial)
Preceded by Tim Burchett	United States representatives by seniority 191st	Succeeded by Ben Cline
