= Tom Casten =

American businessman

Thomas Casten
- Born: 1942 (age 83–84)
- Education: University of Colorado (BA); Columbia University (MBA)
- Spouse: Judy (m. 1965)
- Children: Sean and 2 others

Thomas R. Casten (born 1942) is an American businessman, author, and activist known for his work on industrial energy recycling. Since 1977, Casten has founded and managed numerous companies and organizations associated with combined heat and power (also called cogeneration), decentralized energy, and waste energy recovery.

Casten is a fellow of the Committee for Skeptical Inquiry and a former U.S. Marine and Eagle Scout.

== Education ==
Casten graduated magna cum laude from the University of Colorado Boulder and was valedictorian of his graduating class at Columbia Business School.

== Career ==
Casten was the founding president and CEO of Trigen Energy Corporation (a New York Stock Exchange corporation) and its predecessors from 1977 through 2000. He served until 2006 as founding chair and CEO of Primary Energy and its subsidiary Primary Energy Recycling Corp. In 2006, he founded and was chairman of Recycled Energy Development (RED), based in Westmont, Illinois. In 2016, RED was sold to Ironclad Energy Partners. These companies focused on energy recycling, a process that turns waste energy (usually heat) into clean power and steam. Casten has said his goal is to combat global warming in a profitable way, reducing greenhouse gas emissions and energy costs at the same time.

Casten has served as president of the International District Energy Association and co-founder and chairman of the World Alliance for Decentralized Energy, which are trade associations that promote combined heat and power, district heating, and other forms of distributed generation. Casten also serves on numerous boards for energy-related institutions, has testified before the energy committees of the U.S. Congress, and served on the informal policy advisory team of then-presidential candidate Barack Obama in 2008.

Casten is the author of Turning Off the Heat: Why America Must Double Energy Efficiency to Save Money and Reduce Global Warming. He has also published articles in outlets including American Scientist, the Detroit Free Press, Electricity Journal, and the Albuquerque Journal, as well as a chapter in Energy and American Society: Thirteen Myths. His work on energy recycling received profiles in Forbes, Smithsonian, Nature, US News, The Atlantic, Orian, and National Public Radio.

== Personal life ==
Casten and his wife, Judy, celebrated their 50th wedding anniversary by running the Chicago Marathon in 2015. Casten's son, Sean, was elected to the U.S. House of Representatives in 2018. He has two other children: Damien and Gillian.

Tom is the lone funder of SunshinePAC which contributed to Sean Casten's 2018 election campaign. These contributions became a source of a complaint to the FEC in February 2022.
