= Dual Work Exchanger Energy Recovery =

The Dual Work Exchanger Energy Recovery (DWEER) is an energy recovery device. In the 1990s developed by DWEER Bermuda and licensed by Calder AG for use in the Caribbean. Seawater reverse osmosis (SWRO) needs high pressure and some of the reject stream can be reused by using this device. According to Calder AG, 97% of the energy in the reject stream is recovered.

The DWEER system uses a piston doublechamber reciprocating hydraulically driven pump, and a patented valve system in a high pressure batch process with large pressure vessels, similar to a locomotive, to capture and transfer the energy lost in the membrane reject stream. Its advantage is its high efficiency rate, but it suffers from complex and large mechanical components which are susceptible to seawater corrosion due to its metal composition.
