= Energy recycling =

Process of using energy that would normally be wasted

Energy recycling is the energy recovery process of using energy that would normally be wasted, usually by converting it into electricity or thermal energy. Undertaken at manufacturing facilities, power plants, and large institutions such as hospitals and universities, it significantly increases efficiency, thereby reducing energy costs and greenhouse gas pollution simultaneously. The process is noted for its potential to mitigate global warming profitably. This work is usually done in the form of combined heat and power (also called cogeneration) or waste heat recovery.

== Forms of energy recycling ==
=== Waste heat recovery ===
Waste heat recovery is a process that captures excess heat that would normally be discharged at manufacturing facilities and converts it into electricity and steam, or returns energy to the manufacturing process in the form of heated air, water, glycol, or oil. A "waste heat recovery boiler" contains a series of water-filled tubes placed throughout the area where heat is released. When high-temperature heat meets the boiler, steam is produced, which in turn powers a turbine that creates electricity. This process is similar to that of other fired boilers, but in this case, waste heat replaces a traditional flame. No fossil fuels are used in this process. Metals, glass, pulp and paper, silicon and other production plants are typical locations where waste heat recovery can be effective.

=== Combined heat and power (CHP) ===
Combined heat and power (CHP), also called cogeneration, is, according to the U.S. Environmental Protection Agency, “an efficient, clean, and reliable approach to generating electricity and heat energy from a single fuel source. By installing a CHP system designed to meet the thermal and electrical base loads of a facility, CHP can greatly increase the facility's operational efficiency and decrease energy costs. At the same time, CHP reduces the emission of greenhouse gases, which contribute to global climate change.” When electricity is produced on-site with a CHP plant, excess heat is recycled to produce both processed heat and additional power.

=== Waste heat recovery from air conditioning ===
Waste heat recovery from air conditioning is also used as an alternative to wasting heat to the atmosphere from chiller plants. Heat recovered in summer from chiller plants is stored in Thermalbanks in the ground and recycled back to the same building in winter via a heat pump to provide heating without burning fossil fuels. This elegant approach saves energy - and carbon - in both seasons by recycling summer heat for winter use.

Some companies offer products to install on the HVAC Condenser Unit, to collect waste heat that the condenser is supposed to evacuate in the air, to heat up heat-producing devices like water heaters. Those devices are called heat recovery units (HRU). For residential applications, some units available are : HotSpot Energy Heat Recovery Unit or LG Heat Recovery Units

For industrial applications, these units are usually called waste heat recovery unit (WHRU).

=== Heat pumps ===
Heat pumps and thermal energy storage are classes of technologies that can enable the recycling of energy that would otherwise be inaccessible due to a temperature that is too low for use or a time lag between when the energy is available and when it is needed. While enhancing the temperature of available renewable thermal energy, heat pumps have the additional property of leveraging electrical power (or in some cases mechanical or thermal power) by using it to extract additional energy from a low quality source (such as seawater, lake water, the ground, the air, or waste heat from a process). Innovation efforts are underway now for full electrification of industry, including with Industry Heat Pumps at levels of efficiency between COP 5 & 9 using multi-stage thermal recycling via refrigerant tuned Heat Pump Modules.

=== Thermal storage ===
Thermal storage technologies allow heat or cold to be stored for periods of time ranging from hours or overnight to interseasonal, and can involve storage of sensible energy (i.e. by changing the temperature of a medium) or latent energy (i.e. through phase changes of a medium, such between water and slush or ice). Short-term thermal storages can be used for peak-shaving in district heating or electrical distribution systems. Kinds of renewable or alternative energy sources that can be enabled include natural energy (e.g. collected via solar-thermal collectors, or dry cooling towers used to collect winter's cold), waste energy (e.g. from HVAC equipment, industrial processes or power plants), or surplus energy (e.g. as seasonally from hydropower projects or intermittently from wind farms). The Drake Landing Solar Community (Alberta, Canada) is illustrative. Borehole thermal energy storage allows the community to get 97% of its year-round heat from solar collectors on the garage roofs, with most of the heat collected in summer. Types of storages for sensible energy include insulated tanks, borehole clusters in substrates ranging from gravel to bedrock, deep aquifers, or shallow lined pits that are insulated on top. Some types of storage are capable of storing heat or cold between opposing seasons (particularly if very large), and some storage applications require inclusion of a heat pump. Latent heat is typically stored in ice tanks or what are called phase-change materials (PCMs).

== Current system ==
Both waste heat recovery and CHP constitute "decentralized" energy production, which is in contrast to traditional "centralized" power generated at large power plants run by regional utilities. The “centralized” system has an average efficiency of 34 percent, requiring about three units of fuel to produce one unit of power. By capturing both heat and power, CHP and waste heat recovery projects have higher efficiencies.

A 2007 Department of Energy study found the potential for 135,000 megawatts of CHP in the U.S., and a Lawrence Berkeley National Laboratory study identified about 64,000 megawatts that could be obtained from industrial waste energy, not counting CHP. These studies suggest about 200,000 megawatts—or 20% -- of total power capacity that could come from energy recycling in the U.S. Widespread use of energy recycling could therefore reduce global warming emissions by an estimated 20 percent. Indeed, as of 2005, about 42 percent of U.S. greenhouse gas pollution came from the production of electricity and 27 percent from the production of heat.

Advocates contend that recycled energy costs less and has lower emissions than most other energy options in current use.

Currently RecyclingEnergy Int. Corp. takes advantage of recycling energy in heat recovery ventilation and latent heat pump and CHCP.

== History ==
Perhaps the first modern use of energy recycling was done by Thomas Edison. His 1882 Pearl Street Station, the world's first commercial power plant, was a CHP plant, producing both electricity and thermal energy while using waste heat to warm neighboring buildings. Recycling allowed Edison's plant to achieve approximately 50 percent efficiency.

By the early 1900s, regulations emerged to promote rural electrification through the construction of centralized plants managed by regional utilities. These regulations not only promoted electrification throughout the countryside, but they also discouraged decentralized power generation, such as CHP. They even went so far as to make it illegal for non-utilities to sell power.

By 1978, Congress recognized that efficiency at central power plants had stagnated and sought to encourage improved efficiency with the Public Utility Regulatory Policies Act (PURPA), which encouraged utilities to buy power from other energy producers. CHP plants proliferated, soon producing about 8 percent of all energy in the U.S. However, the bill left implementation and enforcement up to individual states, resulting in little or nothing being done in many parts of the country.

In 2008 Tom Casten, chairman of Recycled Energy Development, said that "We think we could make about 19 to 20 percent of U.S. electricity with heat that is currently thrown away by industry."

Outside the U.S., energy recycling is more common. Denmark is probably the most active energy recycler, obtaining about 55% of its energy from CHP and waste heat recovery. Other large countries, including Germany, Russia, and India, also obtain a much higher share of their energy from decentralized sources.

== See also ==
- Energy conservation – Reducing energy consumption
- Renewable energy – Energy collected from renewable resources
- Sustainable energy – Energy that responsibly meets social, economic, and environmental needs
- Waste heat recovery unit – Energy recovery heat exchanger
- Water heat recycling – Use of a heat exchanger to recover energy and reuse heat from drain water
