= Bea Johnson =

Franco-American environmentalist

Béa Johnson
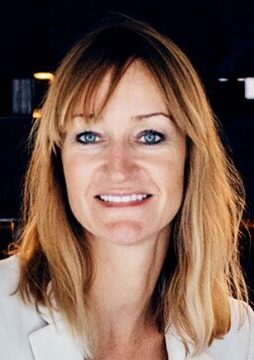
- Johnson, in 2017
- Born: 1974 (age 51–52); Besançon, France
- Citizenship: France; United States
- Occupations: Environmentalist, author, motivational speaker
- Years active: 2006–present
- Known for: Waste-free living activism; Zero Waste Home: The Ultimate Guide to Simplifying Your Life by Reducing Your Waste
- Movement: Zero waste
- Spouse: Scott Johnson
- Children: Max and Leo
- Website: zerowastehome.com

Béa Johnson is a US-based environmental activist, author and motivational speaker. She is best known for waste free living by reducing her family's annual trash down to a pint and for authoring the book Zero Waste Home: The Ultimate Guide to Simplifying Your Life by Reducing Your Waste. Having started to adhere to simple living as early as 2006, Johnson is widely recognized for pioneering and popularizing waste-free living.

== Background ==
Bea Johnson was born in France. She grew up in Provence. At the age of 18, she moved to California as an au pair and met her future husband Scott Johnson.

== Activism ==
Johnson's family began to follow a minimalist lifestyle in 2006, after a move forced them to downsize. In 2008, Johnson discovered the term "zero waste" (which back then was used for manufacturing practices and waste management) and applied it to her household's simple-living. In 2009, she started to write a blog about her family's lifestyle sharing her ideas and first hand experience. The blog evolved and in 2013 Johnson published a book, summarizing her views and philosophy on minimalism and offering practical advice on how to reduce waste at home. Johnson then started to lecture around the world to spread her ideas. First criticized as "hippie" and "bohemian", the zero waste lifestyle then became more mainstream. As many sources note, her activism and book inspired many people including to change their views on the impact one has on the environment and to modify their consumption habits. This eventually led to the growth of a movement around waste free living. She is also credited for creating of the 5Rs, an acronym of 5 rules to achieve zero waste, and Bulk locator, an app that finds package free and refill stores worldwide.

Her movement has been also described as "too rigid for ordinary people" and sometimes "unrealistic", especially during the coronavirus pandemic. According to MSN News, Johnson had to cancel her speaking tour in the US due to quarantine and lockdown policies in 2020 but still maintained her zero waste lifestyle while living on the road and staying at the campgrounds.

== Zero Waste Home book ==
First published in April 2013 by Scribner, the book consists of an introduction, 9 chapters and a conclusion. The first Chapter "The 5Rs and the Benefits of the Zero Waste Lifestyle explains the core principles of her zero waste philosophy. It is followed with chapters containing practical advice on how to apply these principles to everyday life. The conclusion describes what the future would look like if zero waste was adopted by the entire civilization. Although some bloggers and professional literary critics pointed to some immanent radicalism about the zero waste movement, the book generally received positive reviews. As Gypsy Soul wrote: "The book is split into sections which makes it very easy to use as a reference book when you want to tackle a certain area of your life." Another critic Master Michael Quinn notes: "This is a book about values that forces us to examine our own. The focus is on our consumption habits and the role they play in the destruction of this planet we all share."

As of 2020, the book was translated and adapted to 28 languages including German, French, Japanese, Russian, Spanish, Chinese and more.

=== The 5Rs ===
These are the core principles of Johnson's zero-waste adherence policy, which also form her book's philosophy:

- Refuse the things that you do not need
- Reduce the things that you do actually need
- Reuse what you consume
- Recycle only what you cannot refuse, reduce or reuse
- Rot (compost) the rest of your waste

== Publications ==
- Zero Waste Home: The Ultimate Guide to Simplifying Your Life by Reducing Your Waste, ISBN 978-1451697681
- French translation: Zéro Déchet, ISBN 978-2352042570
- Portuguese translation: Desperdício Zero, ISBN 978-9722358972
- Spanish translation: Residuo cero en casa. Guía doméstica para simplificar nuestra vida, ISBN 978-6075462400
- Traditional Chinese translation: 我家沒垃圾：一個加州媽媽的零廢棄生活革命，重新找回更健康、富足、美好的人生, ISBN 978-9573280736

== See also ==
- Conservation
- Individual and political action on climate change
- Simple living
- Sustainable living
