= Recycled Energy Development =

United States Corporation

Recycled Energy Development LLC
- Company type: Private
- Industry: Energy
- Founded: Westmont, Illinois, USA (2006)
- Headquarters: Chicago, Illinois
- Key people: Tom Casten, Chairman; Sean Casten, President and CEO
- Products: Cogeneration, waste heat recovery, energy financing, energy management
- Website: www.recycled-energy.com

Recycled Energy Development, LLC (RED) aims to profitably reduce greenhouse gas emissions by capturing and recycling waste energy, especially through cogeneration and waste heat recovery.

== Overview ==
RED develops, owns, and manages energy recycling facilities. These facilities take energy that’s normally wasted and convert it into electricity and thermal power for manufacturers, universities, hospitals, and other large institutions. Energy recycling is considered a form of “decentralized” energy because it takes place on site at such institutions rather than at large, remote power plants that serve entire regions.

The company’s goal is to cut global warming pollution and energy costs simultaneously, thereby providing an economical approach to mitigating climate change. The company’s work has been featured in media outlets such as Forbes, Nature, the Atlantic, and National Public Radio.

== Founders ==
- Tom Casten, chairman, has been developing decentralized energy recycling projects for over three decades. He was founding president and CEO of Trigen Energy Corporation from 1977 through 2000 and then served as founding chair and CEO of Primary Energy until 2006. Casten has also served as president of the International District Energy Association, co-founder and chairman of the World Alliance for Distributed Energy, and co-founder of the U.S. Clean Heat & Power Association. Casten is also the author of Turning off the Heat: Why America Must Double Energy Efficiency to Save Money and Reduce Global Warming.
- Sean Casten, president and CEO, served as president and CEO of Turbosteam Corporation, a company that focused on small-scale applications of energy recycling, from 2000-2006. He has also served as chairman of the U.S. Clean Heat & Power Association and founding chairman of the Northeast Combined Heat & Power Initiative.
