= Zero waste =

Set of principles focused on waste management

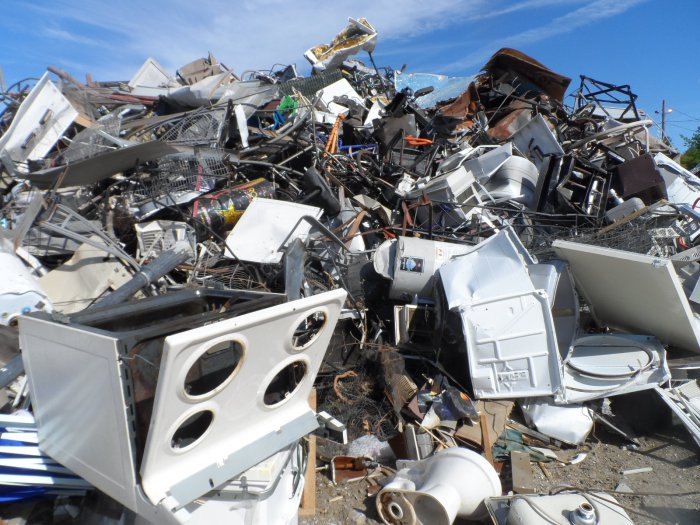
Used products dumped at a scrap metal recycler

Zero waste, or waste minimization, is a set of principles focused on waste prevention that encourages redesigning resource life cycles so that all products are repurposed (i.e. "up-cycled") and/or reused. The goal of the movement is to avoid sending trash to landfills, incinerators, oceans, or any other part of the environment. Currently 9% of global plastic is recycled. In a zero waste system, all materials are reused until the optimum level of consumption is reached.

Zero waste refers to waste prevention as opposed to end-of-pipe waste management. It is a "whole systems" approach that aims for major change in the way materials flow through society, resulting in no waste. Zero waste encompasses more than eliminating waste through reducing, reusing, and recycling. It focuses on restructuring distribution and production systems to reduce waste. Zero waste provides guidelines for continually working towards eliminating waste.

According to the Zero Waste International Alliance (ZWIA), zero waste is the complete recovery of a product's resources "with no discharges to land, water, or air that threaten the environment or human health."

Advocates expect that government regulation is needed to influence industrial choices over product and packaging design, manufacturing processes, and material selection.

Advocates say eliminating waste decreases pollution and can also reduce costs due to the reduced need for raw materials.

== Cradle-to-Cradle ==
The cradle-to-grave is a linear material model that begins with resource extraction, moves to product manufacturing, and ends with a "grave" or landfill where the product is disposed of. Cradle-to-grave is in direct contrast to cradle-to-cradle materials or products, which are recycled into new products at the end of their lives so that ultimately there is no waste.

Cradle-to-cradle focuses on designing industrial systems so that materials flow in closed-loop cycles, which means that waste is minimized and waste products can be recycled and reused. Cradle-to-cradle goes beyond dealing with waste issues after it has been created by addressing problems at the source and redefining problems by focusing on design. The cradle-to-cradle model is sustainable and considerate of life and future generations.

The cradle-to-cradle framework has evolved steadily from theory to practice. In the industrial sector, it is creating a new notion of materials and material flows. Just as in the natural world, in which one organism's "waste" cycles through an ecosystem to provide nourishment for other living things, cradle-to-cradle materials circulate in closed-loop cycles, providing nutrients for nature or industry.

The spread of industrialization worldwide has been accompanied by a large increase in waste production. In 2012 the World Bank stated that 1.3 billion tons of municipal waste was produced by urban populations and estimates that the number will reach 2.2 billion tons by 2025 (Global Solid Waste Management Market - Analysis and Forecast). The increase in solid waste production increases the need for landfills. With the increase in urbanization, these landfills are being placed closer to communities. These landfills are disproportionately located in areas of low socioeconomic status with primarily non-white populations. Findings indicated these areas are often targeted as waste sites because permits are more easily acquired and there was generally less community resistance. Additionally, within the last five years, more than 400 hazardous waste facilities have received formal enforcement actions for unspecified violations that were considered to be a risk to human health.

There is a growing global population that is faced with limited resources from the environment.^{[7]} To relieve the pressures placed on the finite resources available it has become more important to prevent waste. To achieve zero waste, waste management has to move from a linear system to a more cyclical one so that materials, products, and substances are used as efficiently as possible. Materials must be chosen so that they may either return safely to a cycle within the environment or remain viable in the industrial cycle.^{[8]}

Zero waste promotes not only reuse and recycling but, more importantly, it promotes prevention and product designs that consider the entire product life cycle.^{[8]} Zero-waste designs strive for reduced material use, use of recycled materials, use of more benign materials, longer product lives, repairability, and ease of disassembly at the end of life.^{[3]} Zero waste strongly supports sustainability by protecting the environment, reducing costs and producing additional jobs in the management and handling of waste back into the industrial cycle.^{[8]} A Zero waste strategy may be applied to businesses, communities, industrial sectors, schools, and homes.

Benefits proposed by advocates include:

- Saving money. Since waste is a sign of inefficiency, the reduction of waste can reduce costs.
- Faster Progress. A zero-waste strategy improves upon production processes and improves environmental prevention strategies which can lead to taking larger, more innovative steps.
- Supports sustainability. A zero-waste strategy supports all three of the generally accepted goals of sustainability - economic well-being, environmental protection, and social well-being.^{[8]}
- Improved material flows. A zero-waste strategy would use far fewer new raw materials and send no waste materials to landfills. Any material waste would either return as reusable or recycled materials or would be suitable for use as compost.^{[8]}

== Health ==
Before control measures like containment of leachate are enacted, a major issue with landfills are the pollutants emitted. An Italian study examined the pollutants emitted and health issues using levels of hydrogen sulfide/sulphide (H2S) as a surrogate for all the other pollutants emitted. These studies showed that the hydrogen sulfide exposure increased with proximity to the landfill. It found a positive association between waste gases emitted and increased morbidity and mortality due to respiratory disease and lung cancer, especially in children.

Household chemicals and prescription drugs are increasingly being found in large quantities in the leachate from landfills. This is causing concern about the ability of landfills to contain these materials and the possibility of these chemicals and drugs making their way into the groundwater and the surrounding environment.

Zero waste promotes a circular material flow that allows materials to be used over and over, reducing the need for landfill space. Through zero waste the number of toxins released into the air and water would be decreased and products examined to determine what chemicals are used in the production process.

Health issues related to landfills:

- Birth defects, low birth weight, and exposure to particulates and nitrogen dioxide are associated with close proximity to landfills.
- Respiratory diseases and lung cancers are related to the release of hydrogen sulfide from landfills.

Zero waste promotion of a cyclical product life can help reduce the need to create and fill landfills. This can help reduce incidents of respiratory diseases and birth defects that are associated with the toxins released from landfills. Zero waste can also help preserve local environments and potable water sources by preventing pollutants from entering the ecosystem.

== History ==
The California Integrated Waste Management Board established a zero waste goal in 2001. The City and County of San Francisco's Department of the Environment established a goal of zero waste in 2002, which led to the City's Mandatory Recycling and Composting Ordinance in 2009.

A group that would become the Zero Waste International Alliance (ZWIA) held its first meeting in 2002, chaired by British economist and environmentalist Robin Murray.

In 2008, Zero Waste was a term used to describe manufacturing and municipal waste management practices. Bea Johnson, a French American woman living in California, decided to apply it to her 4-person household. In 2009, she started the blog Zero Waste Home, and in 2010, was featured in The New York Times.

The International Day of Zero Waste was adopted by the United Nations General Assembly on December 14, 2022. The event has been held annually on March 30 since 2023. "During International Day of Zero Waste, Member States, organizations of the United Nations system, civil society, the private sector, academia, youth and other stakeholders are invited to engage in activities aimed at raising awareness of national, subnational, regional and local zero-waste initiatives and their contribution to achieving sustainable development. The United Nations Environment Programme (UNEP) and the United Nations Human Settlements Programme (UN-Habitat) jointly facilitate the observance of International Day of Zero Waste."

== Packaging Examples ==
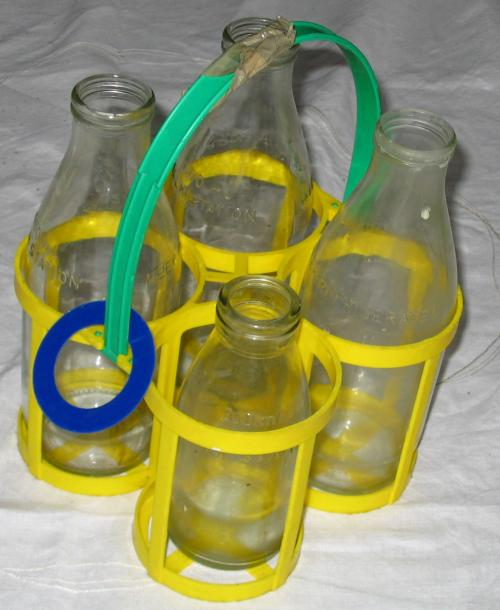
Returnable glass milk bottles

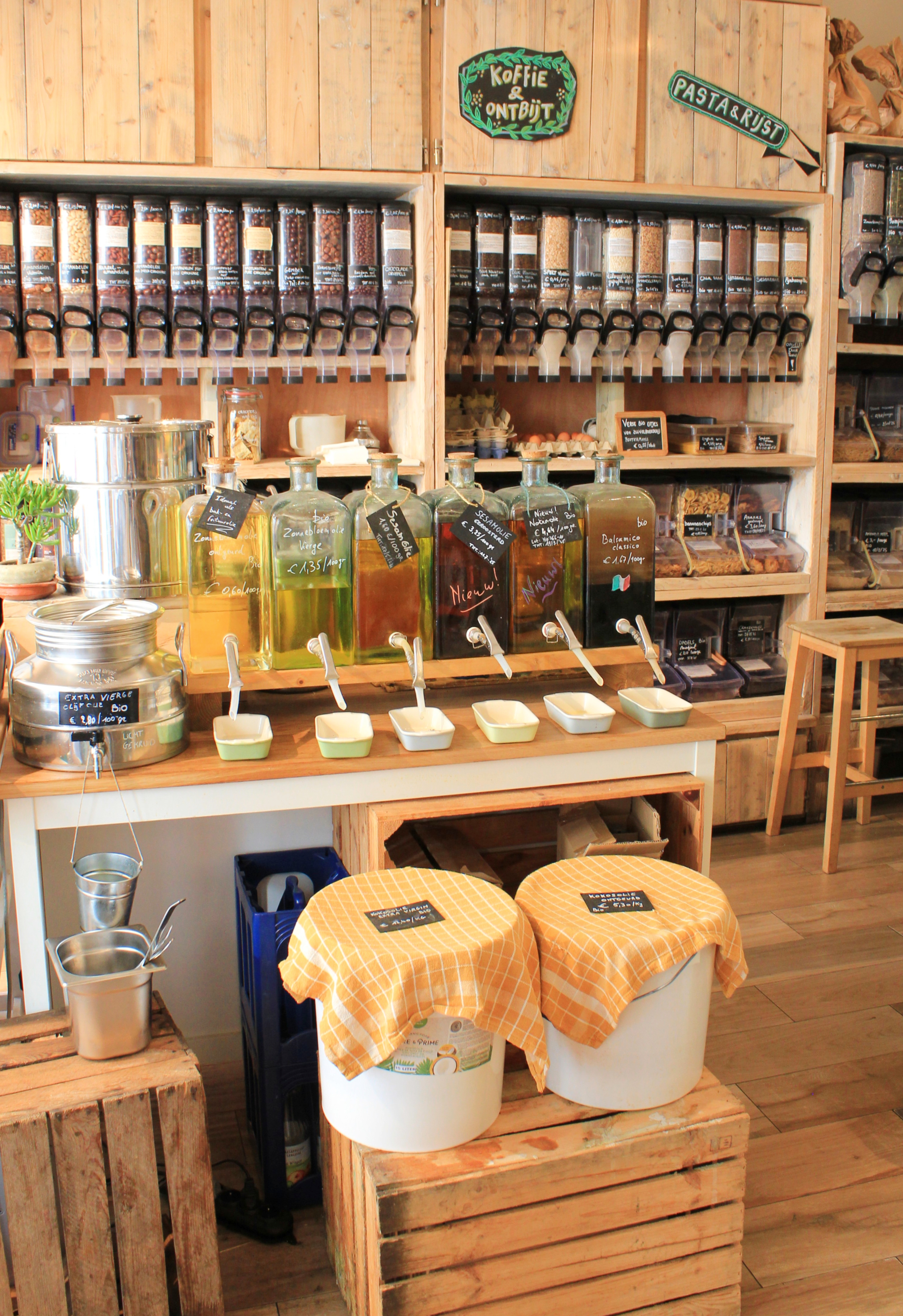
Zero-waste store in Antwerp, Belgium

Milk can be shipped in many forms. One of the traditional forms was reusable returnable glass milk bottles, often home delivered by a milkman. While some of this continues, other options have recently been more common: one-way gable-top paperboard cartons, one-way aseptic cartons, one-way recyclable glass bottles, one-way milk bags, and others. Each system claims some advantages and also has possible disadvantages. From the zero-waste standpoint, the reuse of bottles is beneficial because the material usage per trip can be less than other systems. The primary input (or resource) is silica-sand, which is formed into glass and then into a bottle. The bottle is filled with milk and distributed to the consumer. A reverse logistics system returns the bottles for cleaning, inspection, sanitization, and reuse. Eventually, the heavy-duty bottle would not be suited for further use and would be recycled. Waste and landfill usage would be minimized. The material waste is primarily the wash water, detergent, transportation, heat, bottle caps, etc. While true zero waste is never achieved, a life cycle assessment can be used to calculate the waste at each phase of each cycle.

Online shopping orders are often placed in an outer box to contain multiple items for easier transport and tracking. This creates waste for every order, especially when there is only a single item. In response, some products are now designed not to require an outer box for safe shipping, a feature known as ships in own container.

== Recycling ==
It is important to distinguish recycling from zero waste. The most common practice of recycling is simply that of placing bottles, cans, paper, and packaging into curbside recycling bins. The modern version of recycling is more complicated and involves many more elements of financing and government support. For example, a 2007 report by the U.S. Environmental Protection Agency states that the US recycles at a national rate of 33.5% and includes in this figure composted materials. In addition, many multinational commodity companies have been created to handle recycled materials. At the same time, claims of recycling rates have sometimes been exaggerated, for example by the inclusion of soil and organic matter used to cover garbage dumps daily, in the "recycled" column. In US states with recycling incentives, there is constant local pressure to inflate recycling statistics.

Recycling has been separated from the concept of zero waste. One example of this is the computer industry where worldwide millions of PC's are disposed of as electronic waste each year in 2016 44.7 million metric tons of electronic waste was generated of which only 20% was documented and recycled. Some computer manufacturers refurbish leased computers for resale. Community Organizations have also entered this space by refurbishing old computers from donation campaigns for distribution to undeserved communities.

=== Software recycling ===
A clear example of the difference between zero waste and recycling is discussed in Getting to Zero Waste, in the software industry. Zero waste design can be applied to intellectual property where the effort to code functionality into software objects is developed by design as opposed to copying code snippets multiple times when needed. The application of zero waste is straightforward as it conserves human effort. Also, software storage mediums have transitioned from consumable diskettes to internal drives which are vastly superior and have a minimal cost per megabyte of storage. This is a physical example where zero waste correctly identifies and avoids wasteful behavior.

=== Use of zero waste system ===
Zero waste is poorly supported by the enactment of government laws to enforce the waste hierarchy.

A special feature of zero waste as a design principle is that it can be applied to any product or process, in any situation or at any level. Thus it applies equally to toxic chemicals as to benign plant matter. It applies to the waste of atmospheric purity by coal-burning or the waste of radioactive resources by attempting to designate the excesses of nuclear power plants as "nuclear waste". All processes can be designed to minimize the need for discard, both in their own operations and in the usage or consumption patterns which the design of their products leads to. Recycling, on the other hand, deals only with simple materials.

Zero waste can even be applied to the waste of human potential by enforced poverty and the denial of educational opportunity. It encompasses redesign for reduced energy wasting in industry or transportation and the wasting of the earth's rainforests. It is a general principle of designing for the efficient use of all resources, however defined.

The recycling movement may be slowly branching out from its solid waste management base to include issues that are similar to the community sustainability movement.

Zero waste, on the other hand, is not based in waste management limitations to begin with but requires that we maximize our existing reuse efforts while creating and applying new methods that minimize and eliminate destructive methods like incineration and recycling. Zero waste strives to ensure that products are designed to be repaired, refurbished, re-manufactured and generally reused.

== Significance of dump capacity ==
Many dumps are currently exceeding carrying capacity. This is often used as a justification for moving to Zero Waste. Others counter by pointing out that there are huge tracts of land available throughout the US and other countries which could be used for dumps. Proposals abound to destroy all garbage as a way to solve the garbage problem. These proposals typically claim to convert all or a large portion of existing garbage into oil and sometimes claim to produce so much oil that the world will henceforth have abundant liquid fuels. One such plan, called Anything Into Oil, was promoted by Discover Magazine and Fortune Magazine in 2004 and claimed to be able to convert a refrigerator into "light Texas crude" by the application of high-pressure steam.

=== Corporate initiatives ===
An example of a company that has demonstrated a change in landfill waste policy is General Motors (GM). GM has confirmed their plans to make approximately half of its 181 plants worldwide "landfill-free" by the end of 2010. Companies like Subaru, Toyota, and Xerox are also producing landfill-free plants. Furthermore, the United States Environmental Protection Agency (EPA) has worked with GM and other companies for decades to minimize waste through its WasteWise program. The goal for General Motors is to find ways to recycle or reuse more than 90% of materials by selling scrap materials, adopting reusable boxes to replace cardboard, and recycling used work gloves. The remainder of the scraps might be incinerated to create energy for the plants. Besides being nature-friendly, it also saves money by cutting out waste and producing more efficient production. Microsoft and Google are two other big companies that have Zero Waste goals. These two companies have goals to keep the majority of their waste out of landfills. Google has six locations that have a Zero Waste to Landfill goal. These locations have a goal to keep 100% of their waste out of landfills. Microsoft has a similar goal, but they are only trying to keep 90% of their waste out of landfills. All these organizations push forth to make our world clean and produce zero waste.

A garden centre in Faversham, UK, has started to prevent plastic plant pots from being passed down to customers. Instead, it reuses the plastic pots only locally in the garden center, but upon selling it to its customers it repots the plants in paper plant pots. It also sells plants wrapped in hessia and uses a variety of techniques to prevent handing down (single-use) plastics to customers

=== Re-use or rot of waste ===
The waste sent to landfills may be harvested as useful materials, such as in the production of solar energy or natural fertilizer/de-composted manure for crops.

It may also be reused and recycled for something that we can actually use. "The success of General Motors in creating zero-landfill facilities shows that zero-waste goals can be a powerful impetus for manufacturers to reduce their waste and carbon footprint," says Latisha Petteway, a spokesperson for the EPA.

== Market-based campaigns ==
Market-based, legislation-mediated campaigns like extended producer responsibility (EPR) and the precautionary principle are among numerous campaigns that have a Zero Waste slogan hung on them by means of claims they all ineluctably lead to policies of Zero Waste. At the moment, there is no evidence that EPR will increase reuse, rather than merely moving discard and disposal into private-sector dumping contracts. The Precautionary Principle is put forward to shift liability for proving new chemicals are safe from the public (acting as guinea pig) to the company introducing them. As such, its relation to Zero Waste is dubious. Likewise, many organizations, cities and counties have embraced a Zero Waste slogan while pressing for none of the key Zero Waste changes. In fact, it is common for many such to simply state that recycling is their entire goal. Many commercial or industrial companies claim to embrace Zero Waste but usually mean no more than a major materials recycling effort, having no bearing on product redesign. Examples include Staples, Home Depot, Toyota, General Motors and computer take-back campaigns. Earlier social justice campaigns have successfully pressured McDonald's to change their meat purchasing practices and Nike to change its labor practices in Southeast Asia. Those were both based on the idea that organized consumers can be active participants in the economy and not just passive subjects. However, the announced and enforced goal of the public campaign is critical. A goal to reduce waste generation or dumping through greater recycling will not achieve a goal of product redesign and so cannot reasonably be called a Zero Waste campaign. Producers should be made responsible for the packaging of the products rather than the consumers in EPR like campaigns by which the participation of the Producers will increase.

== How to achieve ==
National and provincial governments often set targets and may provide some funding, but on a practical level, waste management programs (e.g. pickup, drop-off, or containers for recycling and composting) are usually implemented by local governments, possibly with regionally shared facilities.

Reaching the goal of zero waste requires the products of manufacturers and industrial designers to be easily disassembled for recycling and incorporated back into nature or the industrial system; durability and repairability also reduce unnecessary churn in the product life cycle. Minimizes packaging also solves many problems early in the supply chain. If not mandated by government, choices by retailers and consumers in favor of zero-waste-friendly products can influence production. More and more schools are motivating their students to live a different life and rethink every polluting step they may take. To prevent material from becoming waste, consumers, businesses, and non-profits must be educated in how to reduce waste and recycle successfully.

=== The 5 R's of Bea Johnson ===
Bea Johnson's 5R

In the book Zero Waste Home: The Ultimate Guide to Simplifying your Life by Reducing your Waste the author, Bea Johnson, provides a modified version of the 3 Rs, the 5 Rs: Refuse, Reduce, Reuse, Recycle, Rot to achieve Zero Waste at home. The method, which she developed through years of practicing waste free living and used to reduce her family's annual trash to fit in a pint jar, is now widely used by individuals, businesses and municipalities worldwide.

=== Zero Waste Hierarchy ===
The Zero Waste Hierarchy describes a progression of policies and strategies to support the zero-waste system, from highest and best to lowest use of materials. It is designed to be applicable to all audiences, from policymakers to industry and the individual. It aims to provide more depth to the internationally recognized 3Rs (Reduce, Reuse, Recycle); to encourage policy, activity and investment at the top of the hierarchy; and to provide a guide for those who wish to develop systems or products that move us closer to zero waste. It enhances the zero-waste definition by providing guidance for planning and a way to evaluate proposed solutions. All over the world, in some form or another, a pollution prevention hierarchy is incorporated into recycling regulations, solid waste management plans, and resource conservation programs. In Canada, a pollution prevention hierarchy otherwise referred to as the Environmental Protection Hierarchy was adopted. This Hierarchy has been incorporated into all recycling regulations within Canada and is embedded within all resource conservation methods which all government mandated waste prevention programs follow. While the intention to incorporate the 4th R (recovery)prior to disposal was good, many organizations focused on this 4th R instead of the top of the hierarchy resulting in costly systems designed to destroy materials instead of systems designed to reduce environmental impact and waste. Because of this, along with other resource destruction systems that have been emerging over the past few decades, Zero Waste Canada along with the Zero Waste International Alliance have adopted the only internationally peer-reviewed Zero Waste Hierarchy that focuses on the first 3Rs; Reduce, Reuse and Recycle including Compost.

== Zero waste jurisdictions ==
Various governments have declared zero waste as a goal, including:

- Brazil
  - Florianópolis, Santa Catarina
- Canada
  - Vancouver (see Zero Waste 2040 Strategy)
- Italy
  - Capannori, Tuscany

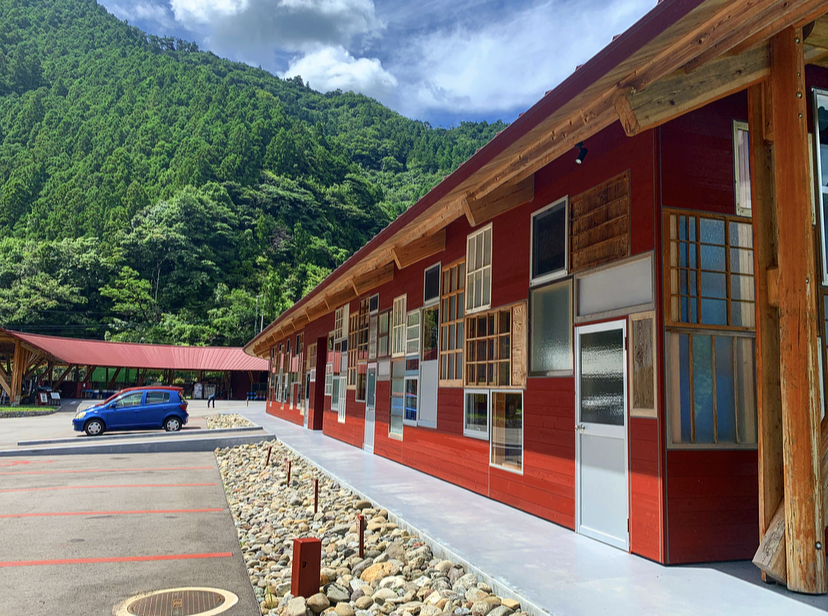
Kamikatsu Zero Waste Center, itself built using recycled materials

- Japan
  - Kamikatsu, Tokushima recycles 80% of its waste at the Kamikatsu Zero Waste Center, and aims for zero waste.
- Sweden (Country wide)
- United States
  - Austin, Texas
  - Boulder, Colorado
  - Fort Collins, Colorado
  - Chula Vista, California
  - Minneapolis, Minnesota
  - San Francisco, California
  - San Jose, California
  - Oakland, California

An example of network governance approach can be seen in the UK under New Labour who proposed the establishment of regional groupings that brought together the key stakeholders in waste management (local authority representatives, waste industry, government offices etc.) on a voluntary basis. There is a lack of clear government policy on how to meet the targets for diversion from landfill which increases the scope at the regional and local level for governance networks. The overall goal is set by government but the route for how to achieve it is left open, so stakeholders can coordinate and decide how best to reach it.

Zero Waste is a strategy promoted by environmental NGOs but the waste industry is more in favor of the capital intensive option of energy from waste incineration. Research often highlights public support as the first requirement for success. In Taiwan, public opinion was essential in changing the attitude of business, who must transform their material use pattern to become more sustainable for Zero Waste to work.

California is a leading state in the United States for having zero-waste goals. California is the state with the most cities in the Zero Waste International Alliance. According to the United States Environmental Protection Agency, multiple cities have defined what it means to be a Zero Waste community and adopted goals to reach that status. Some of these cities include Fresno, Los Angeles, Oakland, San Francisco, Pasadena, Alameda, and San Jose. San Francisco has defined zero waste as "zero discards to the landfill or high-temperature destruction." Here, there is a planned structure to reach Zero Waste through three steps recommended by the San Francisco Department of the Environment. These steps are to prevent waste, reduce and reuse, and recycle and compost. Los Angeles defines zero waste as "maximizing diversion from landfills and reducing waste at the source, with the ultimate goal of striving for more-sustainable solid waste management practices." To reach this goal, major changes will have to be made to product creation, use, and disposal.

== Zero-waste stores ==
Retail stores specializing in zero-waste products and supply practices have opened in various countries, including Spain, the United Kingdom and the United States. As of October 2024 there are over 200 stores in the UK which sell products either unpackaged or with minimal packaging, and where shoppers can bring their own container to take away their purchases.

== Zero-waste restaurants ==
Restaurants adopting zero-waste principles have proliferated since the mid-2010s in countries such as the United Kingdom, the United States, and Finland. These establishments minimize food and operational waste through practices like whole-ingredient sourcing, on-site composting, and upcycling scraps into menu items.

== See also ==
- Environmentalism
- Nursery pots
- Miniwaste
- Packaging waste
- Paul Connett
- Plastic bag ban
- Precycling
- Source reduction
- Throw-away society
- Whole-life cost
- Zero waste agriculture
- Zero-waste fashion
