= Electric turbo-compound =

System generating power from engine exhaust

An electric turbo-compound (ETC) system is defined where a turbine coupled to a generator (turbogenerator) is located in the exhaust gas flow of a reciprocating engine to harvest waste heat energy and convert it into electrical power.

An example of an ETC system is where a turbogenerator is located downstream of a turbocharger turbine of an internal combustion engine (ICE). The power generated from the ETC system can be used to feed into an electrical grid or provide power to local electrical loads such as engine auxiliaries.

ETC systems are commercially available for stationary power gensets and at an advanced stage of development for automotive applications to improve the fuel efficiency of gas and diesel engines by recovering waste energy from the exhaust gases.

The ETC system is typically located downstream of the turbocharger of an ICE. The exhaust gases expand first through the turbocharger turbine and then through the ETC turbine, which drives a high-speed alternator generating DC or AC power. In gensets, this extra power is added to the power output from the primary generator, increasing the system efficiency. For automotive application the ETC would become the primary generator used to power the vehicle’s auxiliary systems.
