= Reuse =

Using something again

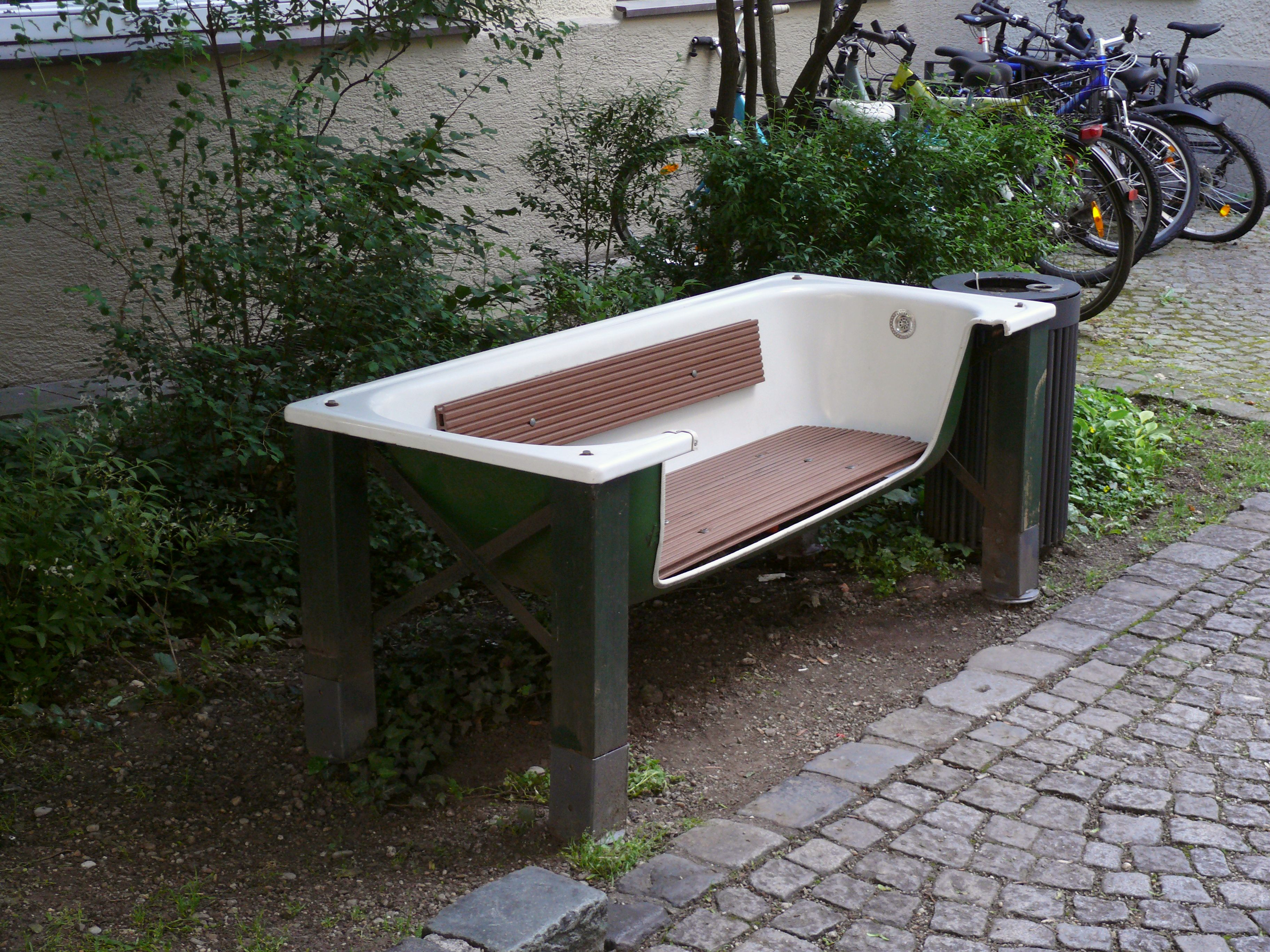
A bathtub upcycled into a bench in Munich.

Reuse is the action or practice of using an item, whether for its original purpose (conventional reuse) or to fulfill a different function (creative reuse or repurposing). It should be distinguished from recycling, which is the breaking down of used items to make raw materials for the manufacture of new products. Reuse—by taking, but not reprocessing, previously used items—helps save time, money, energy and resources. In broader economic terms, it can make quality products available to people and organizations with limited means, while generating jobs and business activity that contribute to the economy.

== Examples ==
=== Reuse centers and virtual exchange ===
Reuse centers (also known as a "swap shop" or a "take-it-or-leave-it") facilitate the transaction and redistribution of unwanted, yet perfectly usable, materials and equipment from one entity to another. The entities that benefit from either side of this service (as donors, sellers, recipients, or buyers) can be businesses, nonprofits, schools, community groups, and individuals. Some maintain a physical space (a reuse center), and others act as a matching service (a virtual exchange). Reuse centers generally maintain both warehouses and trucks. They take possession of the donated materials and make them available for redistribution or sale.

Virtual exchanges do not have physical space or trucks, but instead allow users to post listings of materials available and wanted (for free or at low cost) on an online materials exchange website. Staff will help facilitate the exchange of these materials without ever taking possession of the materials.

== Addressing issues of repair, reuse and recycling ==
One way to address this is to increase product longevity; either by extending a product's first life or addressing issues of repair, reuse and recycling. Reusing products, and therefore extending the use of that item beyond the point where it is discarded by its first user is preferable to recycling or disposal, as this is the least energy intensive solution, although it is often overlooked.

The EU Circular Economy Package recognises the importance of extending product lifetimes and includes repair and reuse of products in its action plan to ensure products reach their optimum lifespan. If targets for reducing greenhouse gas emissions are to be reached, then reuse needs to be included as part of a whole life cycle approach.

A strong second hand market-place exists, with charity shops on most high streets, car boot (trunk) sales and online auction sites maintaining popularity and regular TV shows featuring both buying and selling at auction.

== Business models providing opportunities ==
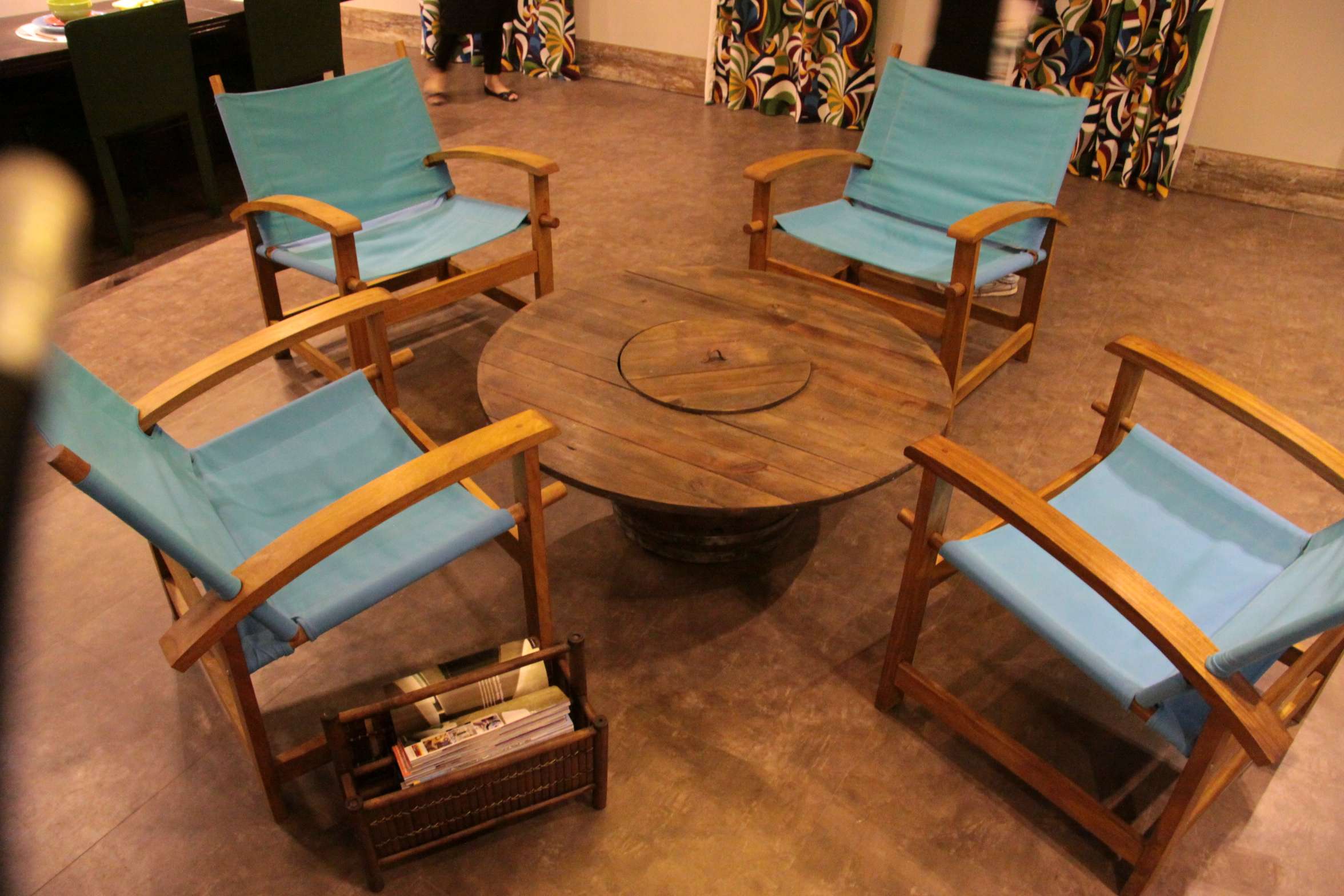
An electric wire reel reused as a center table

This would not necessarily be a poor strategy for businesses, there are business models that provide opportunities to retain ownership of valuable products and components through leasing, servicing, repair and re-sale.

Both in the formal and informal economy there is huge potential for the reuse of goods and materials to deliver social and economic and environmental benefits. The EU Circular Economy Package, the Scottish Circular Economy Strategy and the national reuse target set by the Spanish Government are examples of governments recognising that second-hand goods should be a good value mainstream option and are working towards making reuse easier for consumers.

In environmental terms, reuse ought to be more common than recycling and energy recovery, with both the financial and environmental costs of simple refurbishment of some products being a fraction of original manufacturing costs. If we are going to be serious about living in a Circular Economy we need to recognise the value of our waste and ensure resources are kept in the economy for longer, slow down the use of valuable raw materials and ensure that products are reused and materials are recycled rather than landfilled.

=== Recommerce ===
Recommerce or reverse commerce, is the selling of previously owned, new or used products, mainly electronic devices or media such as books, through physical or online distribution channels to buyers who repair, if necessary, then reuse, recycle or resell them. Recommerce allows for the item to have a second life with a new owner instead for it to be thrown out and left to be forgotten.

=== Resale ===
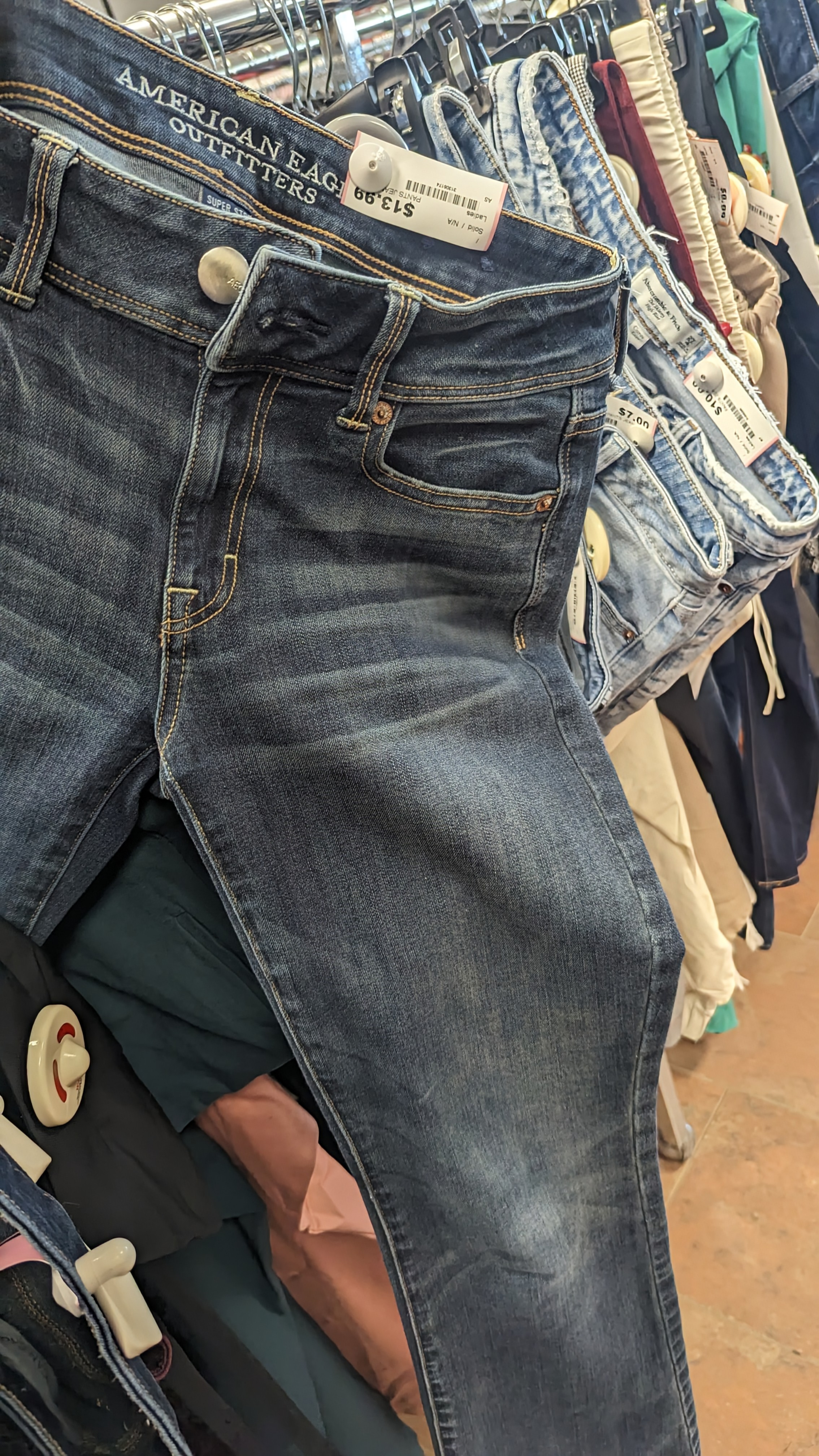
American Eagle Outfitters jeans for sale at a thrift store

A reseller is a company or individual (merchant) that purchases goods or services with the intention of selling them for profit rather than consuming or using them. Resale can be seen in everyday life from yard sales to selling used cars.

Reselling creates a circulation of products, which extends the lifespan of products and reduces the amount of waste in landfills; a used clothing purchased over a new one saves an average about 1 kg of waste, 22 kg of CO_{2}, and 3,040 liters of water. In 2023 the apparel resale market in the US reached approximately $193.7 billion.

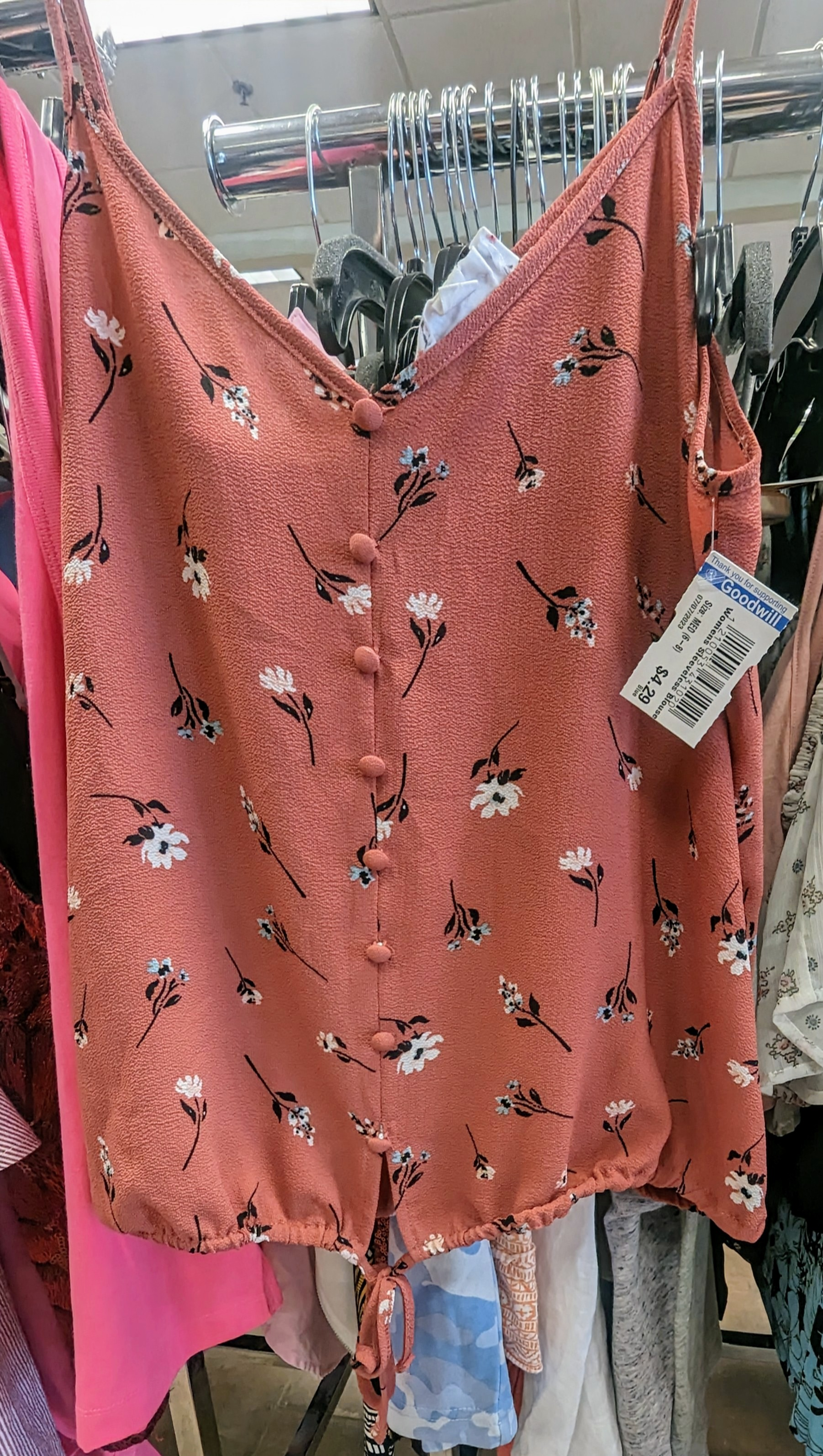
Women's blouse at a Goodwill

=== Remanufacturing ===
The most involved reuse organizations are "repair and overhaul" industries which take valuable parts, such as engine blocks, office furniture, toner cartridges, single-use cameras, aircraft hulls, and cathode ray tubes (CRTs) and refurbish them in a factory environment in order to meet the same/similar specifications as new products.

When the item is resold under the same OEM name, it is informally considered a "gray market" item - if it is sold as used, it's legal, if it's represented as an OEM product eligible for rebates and warranties, it is considered "counterfeit" or "black market". The automobile parts industry in the USA is governed by laws on the disclosure of "used" parts and, in some states, mattresses which have been used are required to be sanitized or destroyed.

=== Package deposit programs ===
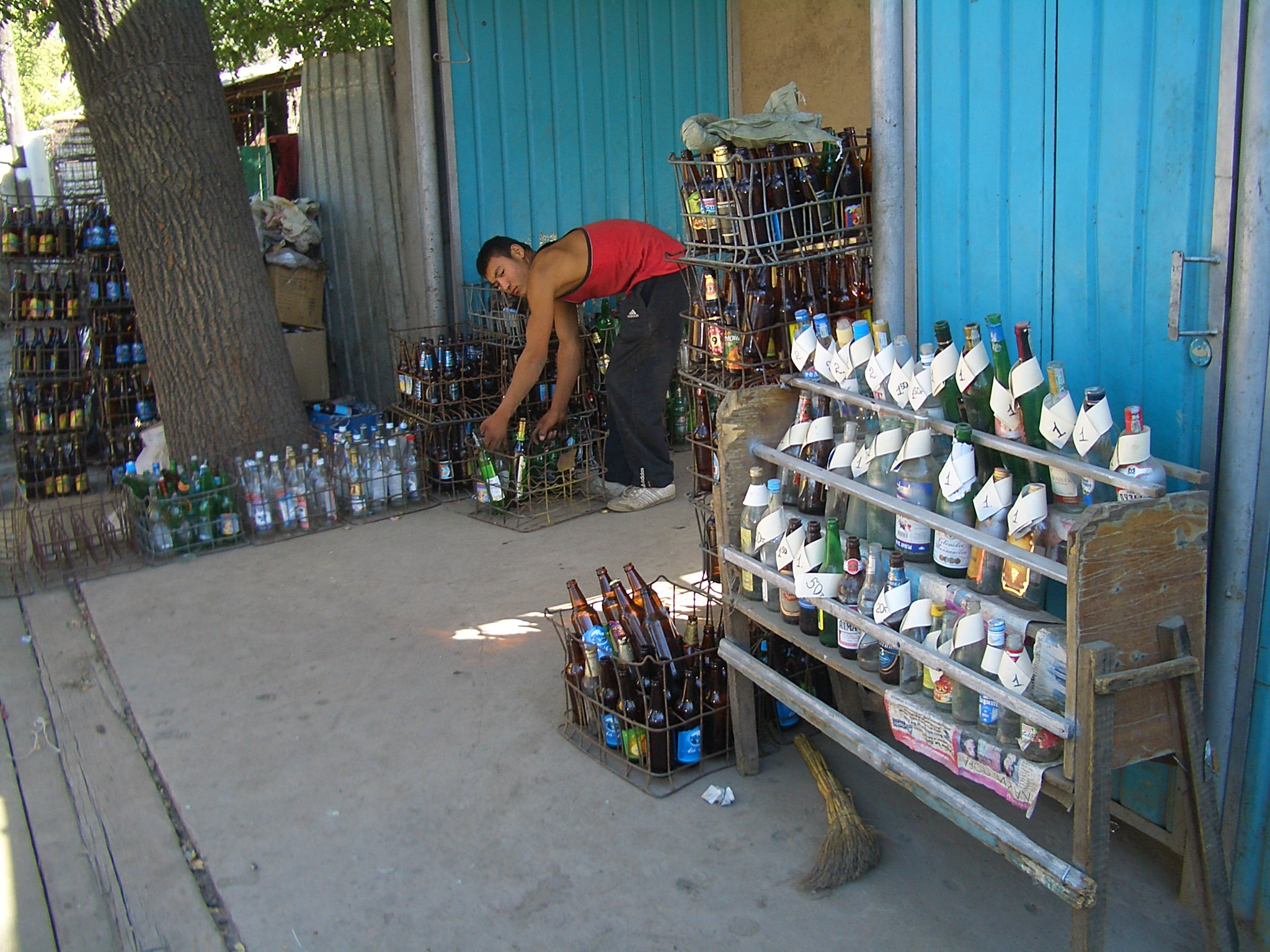
Reusable glass bottles collected in Bishkek, Kyrgyzstan. Deposit values (0.5-2 Kyrgyz som) are posted next to the sample bottles on the rack

Deposit programs offer customers a financial incentive to return packaging for reuse. Although no longer common, international experience is showing that they can still be an effective way to encourage packaging reuse. However, financial incentive, unless great, may be less of an incentive than convenience: statistics show that, on average, a milk bottle is returned 12 times, whereas a lemonade bottle with a 15p deposit is returned, on average, only 3 times.

Refillable bottles are used extensively in many European countries; for example in Denmark, 98% of bottles are refillable, and 98% of those are returned by consumers. These systems are typically supported by deposit laws and other regulations.

Sainsbury Ltd have operated a plastic carrier bag cash refund scheme in 1991 - "the penny back scheme". The scheme is reported to save 970 tonnes of plastic per annum. The scheme has now been extended to a penny back on a voucher which can be contributed to schools registered on the scheme; it estimates this will raise the savings in plastic to 2500 tonnes per annum.

In some developing nations like India and Pakistan, the cost of new bottles often forces manufacturers to collect and refill old glass bottles for selling cola and other drinks. India and Pakistan also have a way of reusing old newspapers: "Kabadiwalas" buy these from the readers for scrap value and reuse them as packaging or recycle them. Scrap intermediaries help consumers dispose of other materials including metals and plastics.

=== Closed-loop programs ===
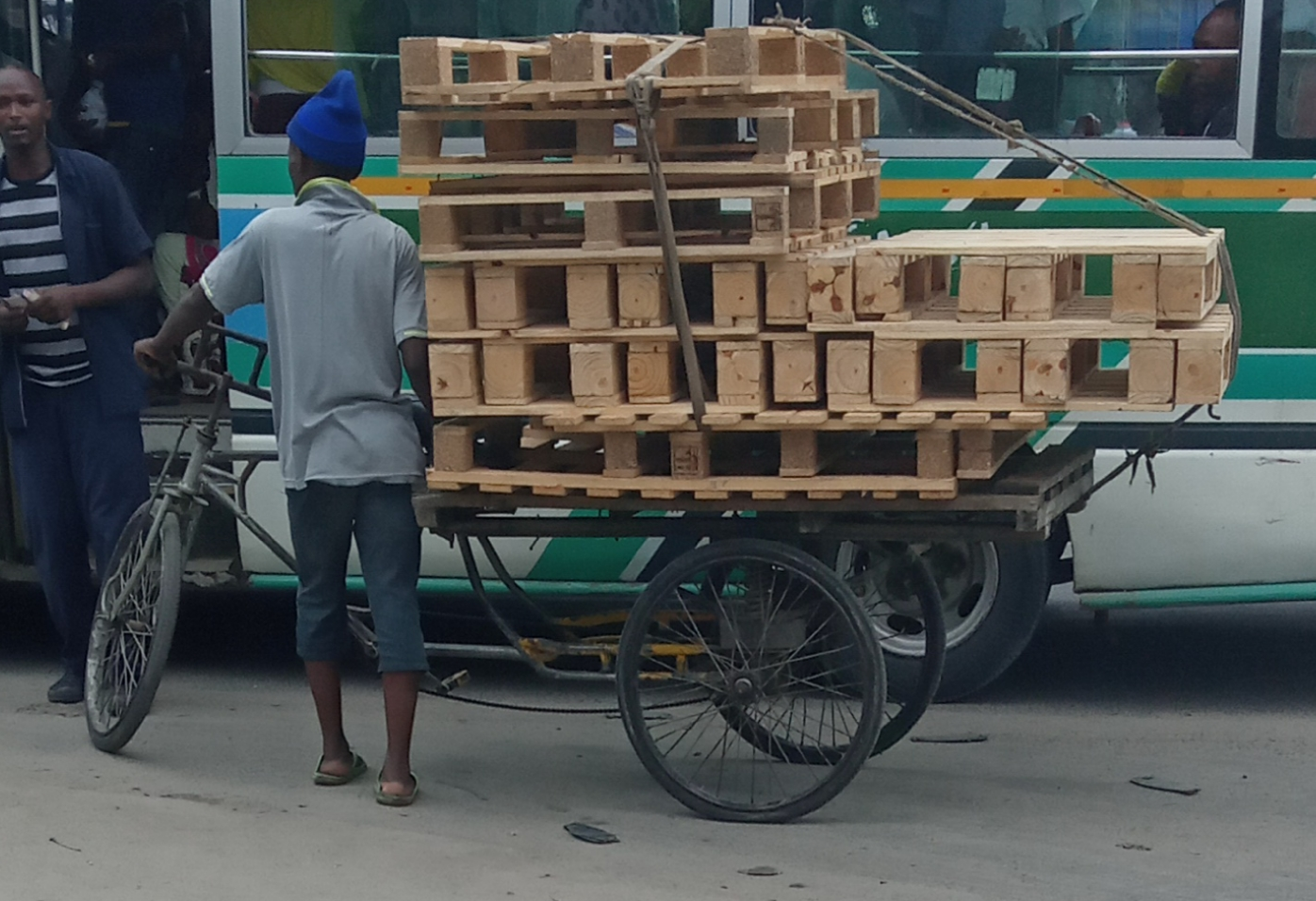
After a pallet has been used for transport, the pallets can be picked up by pallet dealers for reuse which is usually preferred over the cost of disposal fees

These apply primarily to items of packaging, for example, where a company is involved in the regular transportation of goods from a central manufacturing facility to warehouses or warehouses to retail outlets. In these cases there is considerable benefit to using reusable "transport packaging" such as plastic crates or pallets.

The benefits of closed-loop reuse are primarily due to low additional transport costs being involved, the empty lorry returning with the empty crates. There have been some recent attempts to get the public to join in on closed loop reuse schemes where shoppers use reusable plastic baskets in place of carrier bags for transporting their goods home from the supermarket; these baskets fit on specially designed trolleys making shopping supposedly easier.

=== Refilling programs ===
There have been some market-led initiatives to encourage packaging reuse by companies introducing refill packs of certain commodities (mainly soap powders and cleaning fluids), the contents being transferred before use into a reusable package kept by the customer, with the savings in packaging being passed onto the customer by lower shelf prices. The refill pack itself is not reused, but being a minimal package for carrying the product home, it requires less material than one with the durability and features (reclosable top, convenient shape, etc.) required for easy use of the product, while avoiding the transport cost and emissions of returning the reusable package to the factory.

=== Regifting ===
The average American, for example, throws away 67.9 pounds of used clothing and rags.

=== Repurposing ===
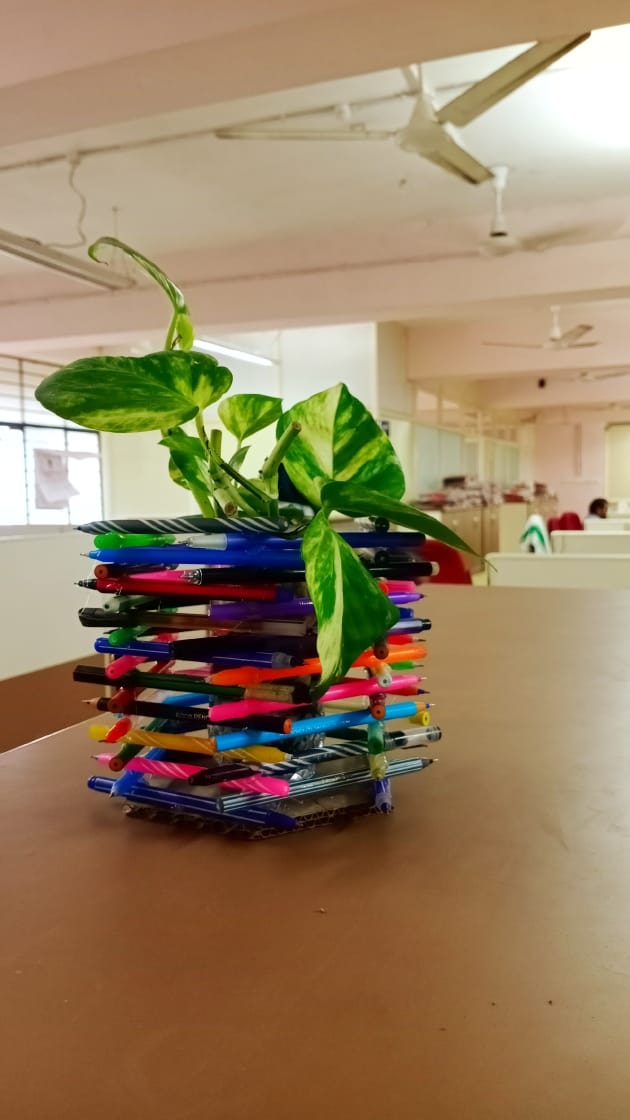
Old pens are being used as a plant pot

Repurposing is to use a tool for use as another tool, usually for a purpose unintended by the original tool-maker. Typically, repurposing is done using items usually considered to be junk or garbage. A good example of this would be the Earthship style of house, that uses tires as insulating walls and bottles as glass walls. Reuse is not limited to repeated uses for the same purpose. Examples of repurposing include using tires as boat fenders and steel drums or plastic drums as feeding troughs and/or composting bins.

=== Reuse of waste water and excreta in agriculture ===
The nutrients, i.e. nitrogen, phosphorus, potassium and micronutrients, and organic matter contained in wastewater, excreta (urine and feces) and greywater have traditionally been reused in agriculture in many countries and are still being reused in agriculture to this day - unfortunately often in an unregulated and unsafe manner. This is particularly a problem in many developing countries (e.g. Mexico, India, Bangladesh, Ghana) where untreated or poorly treated wastewater is used directly in agriculture. The WHO Guidelines from 2006 have set up a framework how this reuse can be done safely by following a multiple barrier approach.

=== Waste valorization ===
Waste valorization, beneficial reuse, value recovery or waste reclamation is the process of waste products or residues from an economic process being valorized (given economic value), by reuse or recycling in order to create economically useful materials. The term comes from practices in sustainable manufacturing and economics, industrial ecology and waste management. The term is usually applied in industrial processes where residue from creating or processing one good is used as a raw material or energy feedstock for another industrial process. Industrial wastes in particular are good candidates for valorization because they tend to be more consistent and predictable than other waste, such as household waste.

Increased regulation of residual materials and socioeconomic changes, such as the introduction of ideas about sustainable development and circular economy in the 1990s and 2000s increased focus on industrial practices to recover resources as value add materials.

== Measuring the impact of reuse, reuse metrics ==
Determining the balance of how the several effects of reuse interact is often best accomplished by a formal life cycle assessment. For example, research has shown that reusing a product can reduce CO_{2} emissions and carbon footprint by more than 50% relative to the complete product life cycle. A relatively unknown effective way to reduce CO_{2} emissions and carbon footprint is reusing products. Often the relative carbon footprint of manufacturing and the supply chain is unknown.

== Internalized environmental costs ==
A Pigovian tax is an environmental tax: a charge on items that reflects the environmental costs of their manufacture and disposal. This makes the environmental benefit of using one reusable item instead of many disposable ones into a financial incentive. Such charges have been introduced in some countries.

== Gallery ==
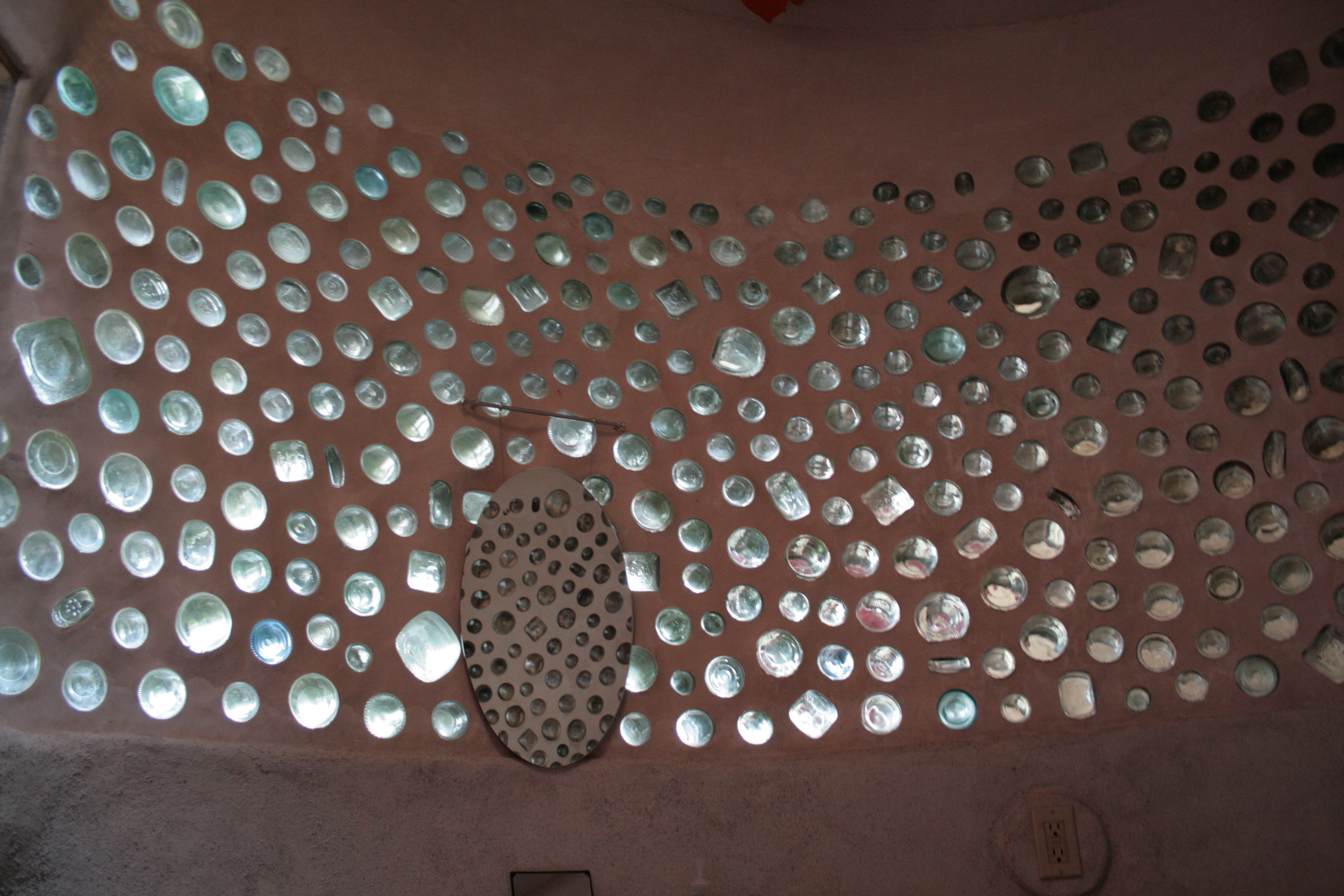
An interior bathroom wall that incorporates repurposed clear glass bottles into a bottle wall

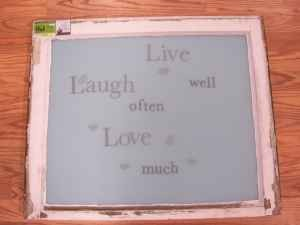
A salvaged window from the deconstruction of an old house turned home decor with paint and stencils

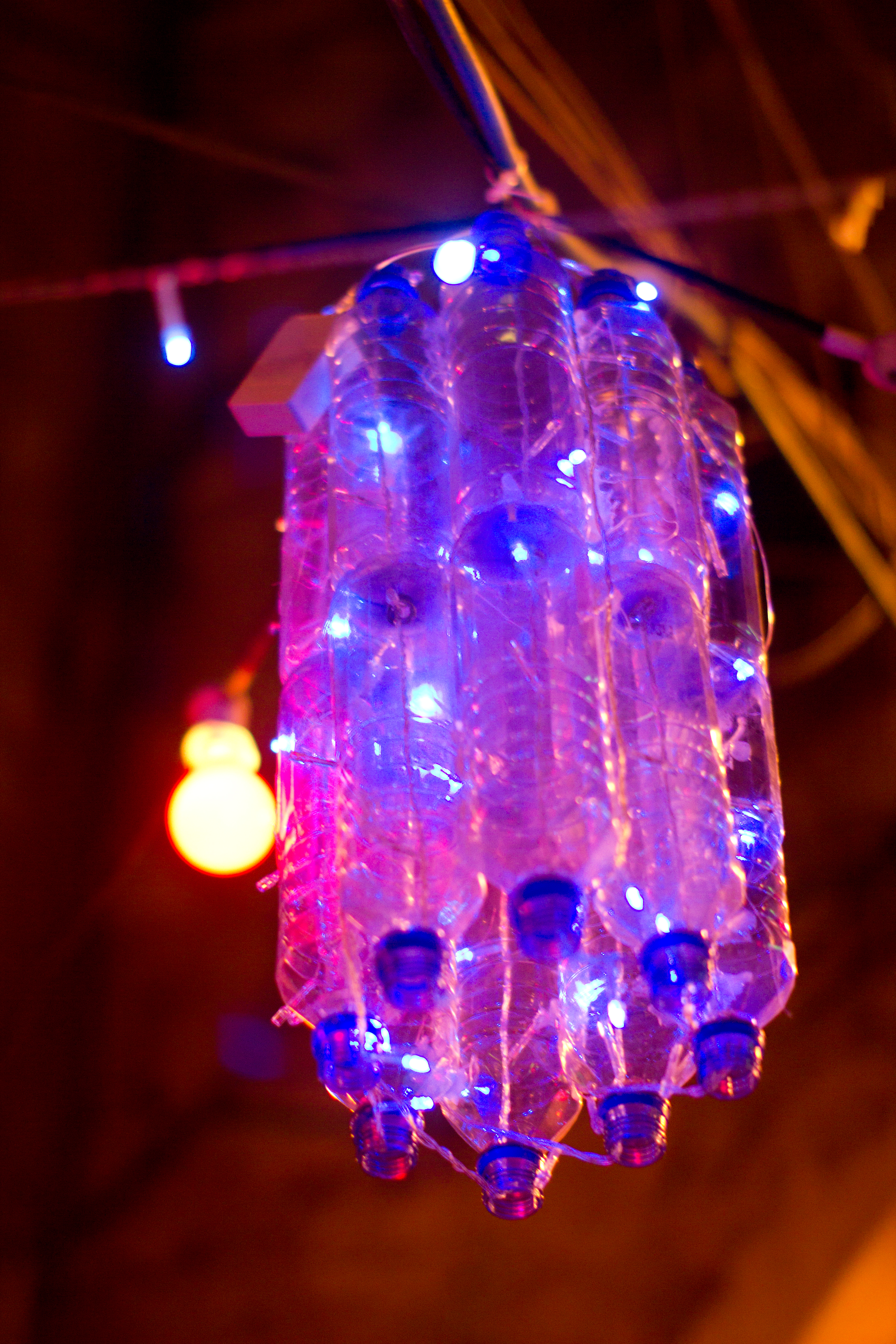
Plastic bottles (with LED lights) repurposed as a chandelier during Ramadan in the Muslim Quarter, Jerusalem

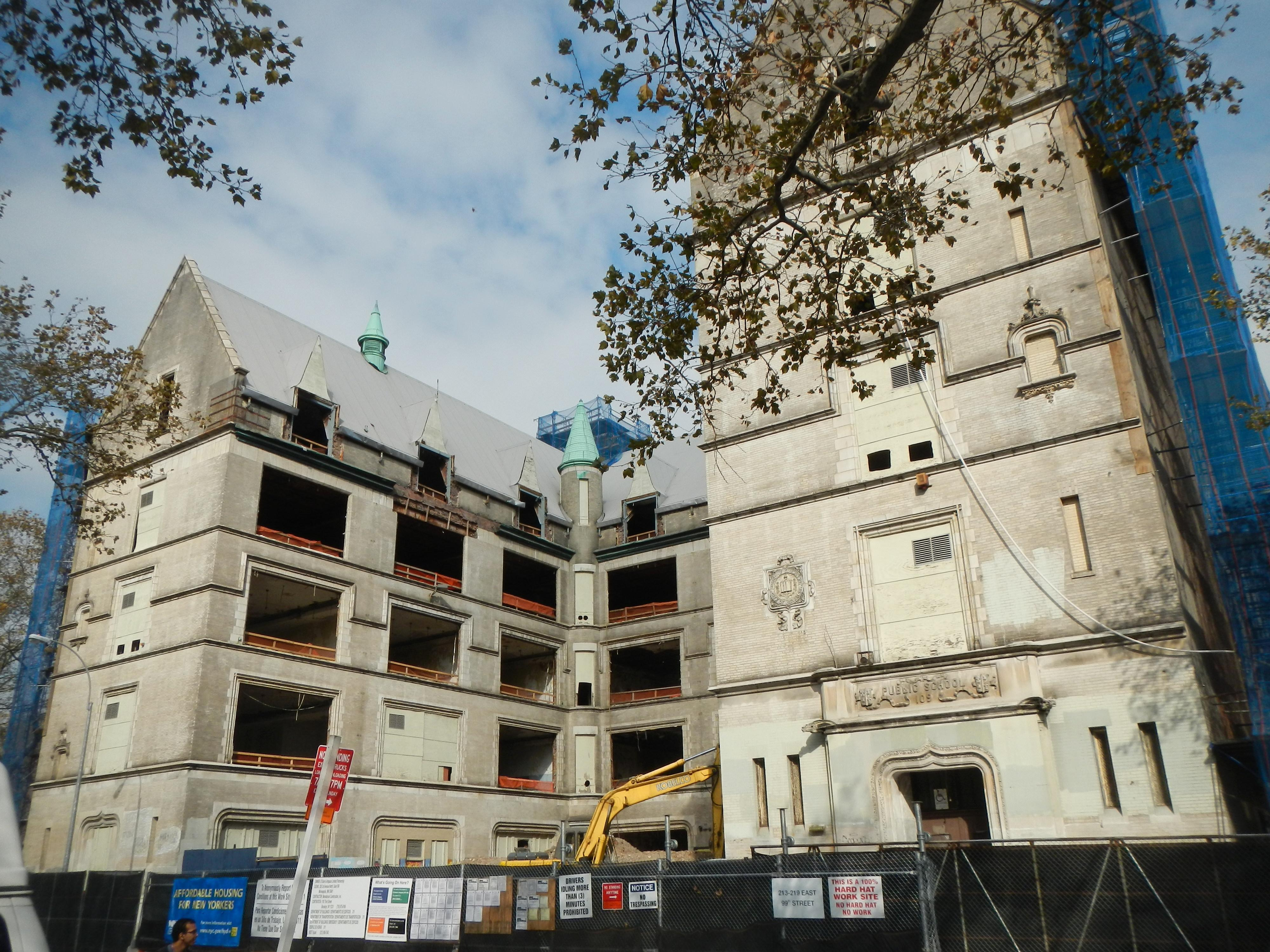
A school being prepared for reuse as housing

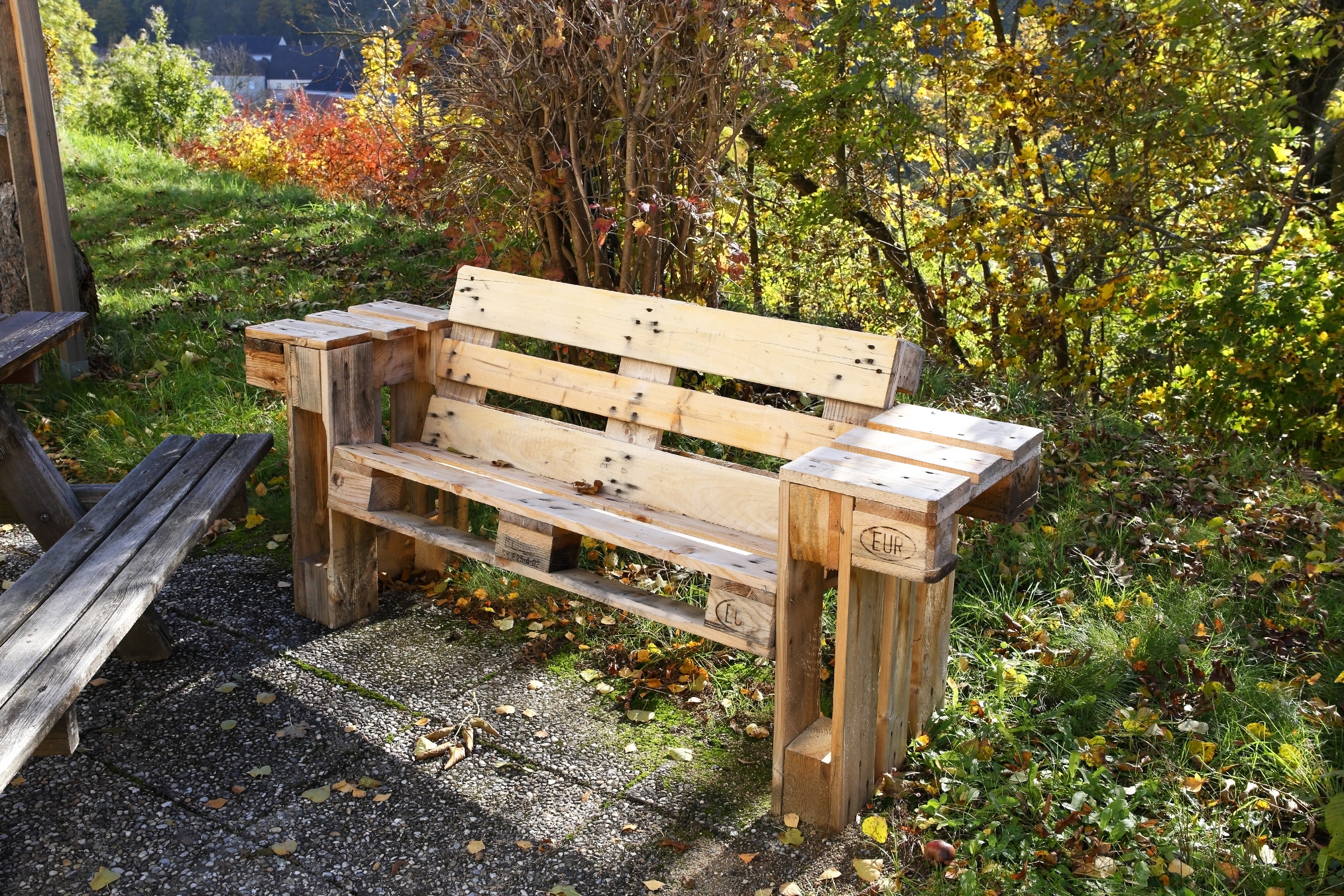
Wooden pallets reused to make a bench

== See also ==
- Code reuse
- Computer recycling
- Heat recovery ventilation
- Micro-sustainability
- Pallet crafts
- Rainwater harvesting
- Rechargeable battery
- Remanufacturing
- Resealable packaging
- Resource recovery
- Reusable launch vehicle
- Reusable shopping bag
- Reusable spacecraft
- Reuse of bottles
- Reuse of human excreta
- Scrap
- Stormwater harvesting
- Used good
- Waste minimization
- Upcycling
