= Waste heat recovery unit =

Energy recovery heat exchanger

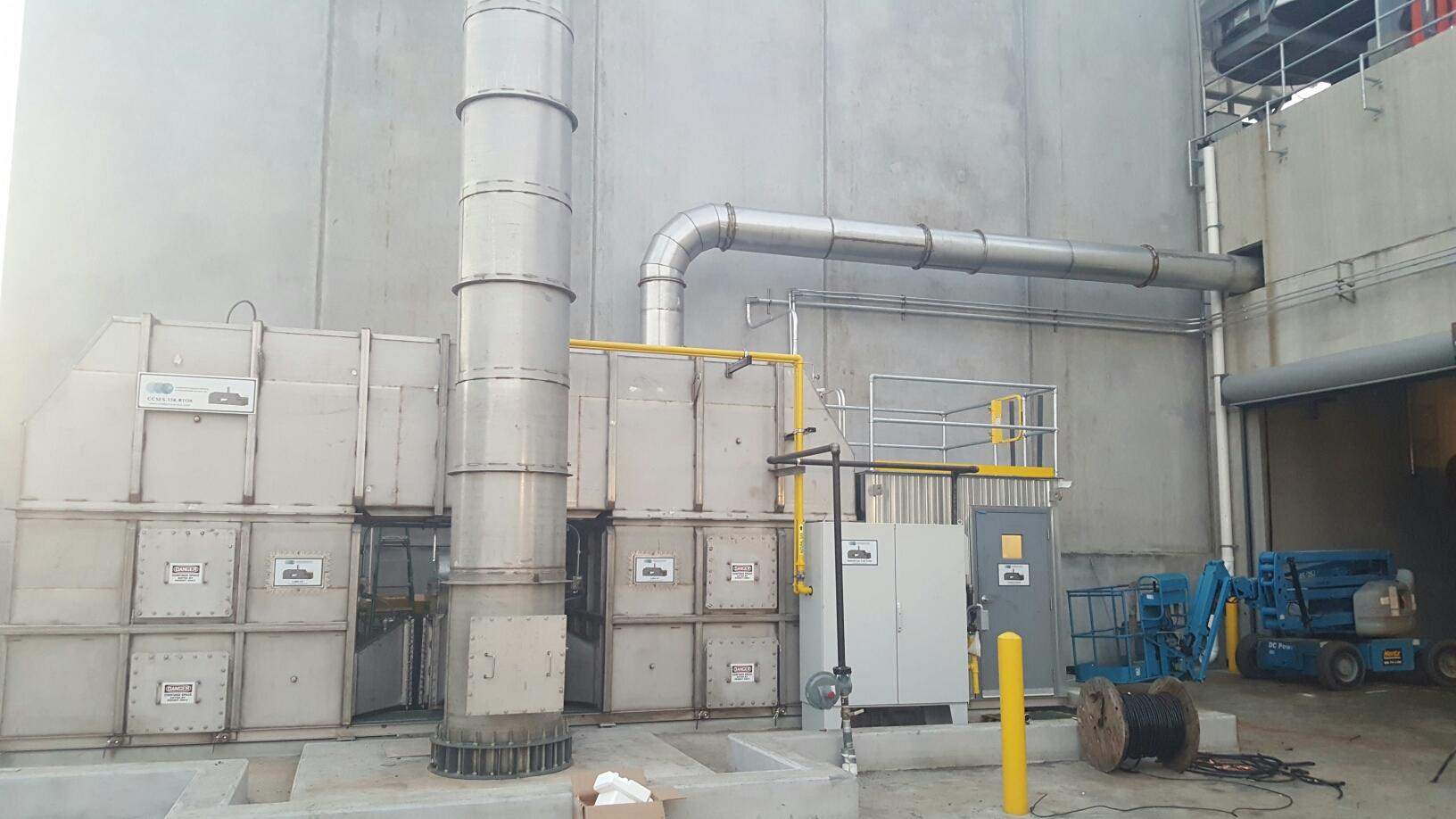
A regenerative thermal oxidizer (RTO) is an example of a waste heat recovery unit that utilizes a regenerative process.

A waste heat recovery unit (WHRU) is an energy recovery heat exchanger that transfers heat from process outputs at high temperature to another part of the process for some purpose, usually increased efficiency. The WHRU is a tool involved in cogeneration. Waste heat may be extracted from sources such as hot flue gases from a diesel generator, steam from cooling towers, or even waste water from cooling processes such as in steel cooling.

== Heat recovery units ==
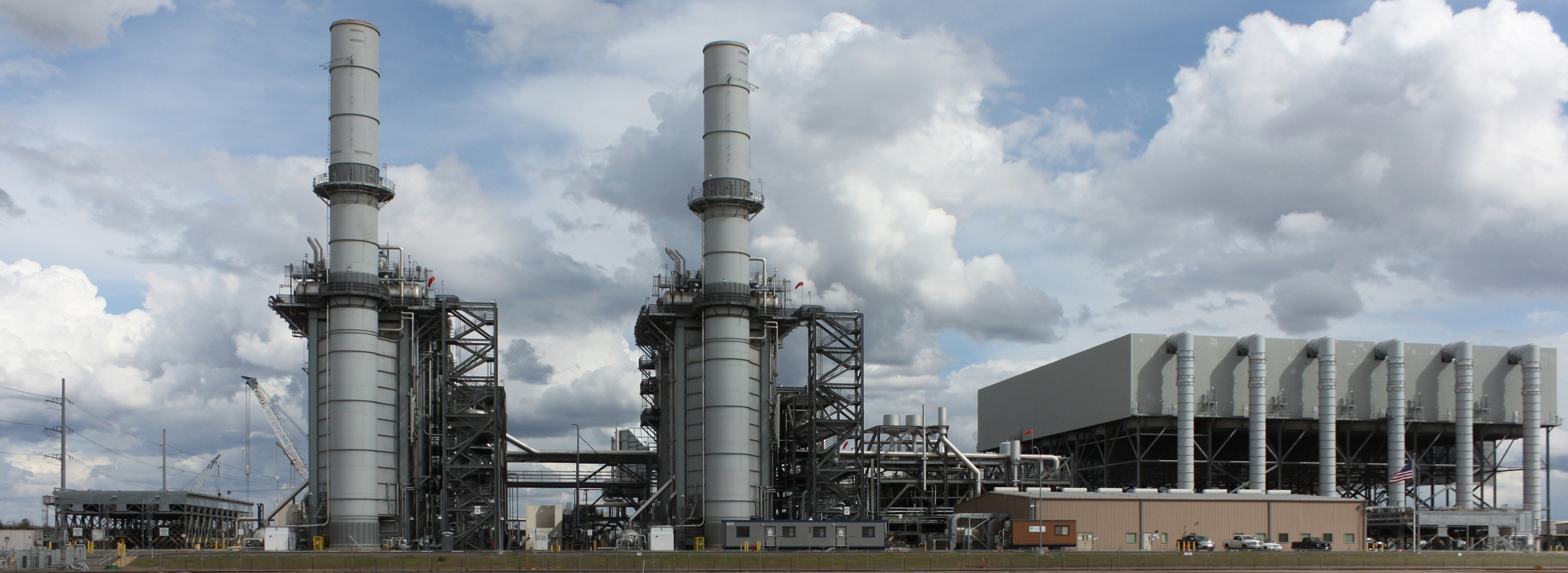
Gateway Generating Station, a combined-cycle gas-fired power station in California, is equipped with two heat recovery steam generators on its combustion turbines.

Waste heat found in the exhaust gas of various processes or even from the exhaust stream of a conditioning unit can be used to preheat the incoming gas. This is one of the basic methods for recovery of waste heat. Many steel making plants use this process as an economic method to increase the production of the plant with lower fuel demand. There are many different commercial recovery units for the transferring of energy from hot medium space to lower one:

- Recuperators: This name is given to different types of heat exchanger that the exhaust gases are passed through, consisting of metal tubes that carry the inlet gas and thus preheating the gas before entering the process. The heat wheel is an example which operates on the same principle as a solar air conditioning unit.
- Regenerators: This is an industrial unit that reuses the same stream after processing. In this type of heat recovery, the heat is regenerated and reused in the process.
- Heat pipe exchanger: Heat pipes are one of the best thermal conductors. They have the ability to transfer heat hundred times more than copper. Heat pipes are mainly known in renewable energy technology as being used in evacuated tube collectors. The heat pipe is mainly used in space, process or air heating, in waste heat from a process is being transferred to the surrounding due to its transfer mechanism.
- Thermal wheel or rotary heat exchanger: consists of a circular honeycomb matrix of heat absorbing material, which is slowly rotated within the supply and exhaust air streams of an air handling system.
- Economizer: In case of process boilers, waste heat in the exhaust gas is passed along a recuperator that carries the inlet fluid for the boiler and thus decreases thermal energy intake of the inlet fluid.
- Heat pumps: Using an organic fluid that boils at a low temperature means that energy could be regenerated from waste fluids.
- Run around coil: comprises two or more multi-row finned tube coils connected to each other by a pumped pipework circuit.
- Particulate filters (DPF) to capture emission by maintaining higher temperatures adjacent to the converter and tail pipes to reduce the amount of emissions from the exhaust.

A waste heat recovery boiler (WHRB) is different from a heat recovery steam generator (HRSG) in the sense that the heated medium does not change phase.

== Heat to power units ==
According to a report done by Energetics Incorporated for the DOE in November 2004 titled Technology Roadmap and several others done by the European Commission, the majority of energy production from conventional and renewable resources are lost to the atmosphere due to onsite (equipment inefficiency and losses due to waste heat) and offsite (cable and transformers losses) losses, that sums to be around 66% loss in electricity value. Waste heat of different degrees could be found in final products of a certain process or as a by-product in industry such as the slag in steelmaking plants. Units or devices that could recover the waste heat and transform it into electricity are called WHRUs or heat to power units:

- An organic Rankine cycle (ORC) unit uses an organic fluid as the working fluid. The fluid has a lower boiling point than water to allow it to boil at low temperature, to form a superheated gas that can drive the blade of a turbine and thus a generator.
- Thermoelectric (Seebeck, Peltier, Thomson effects) units may also be called WHRU, since they use the heat differential between two plates to produce direct current (DC) power.
- Shape-memory alloys can also be used to recover low temperature waste heat and convert it to mechanical action or electricity.

== Applications ==
- Traditionally, waste heat of low temperature range (0-120 °C, or typically under 100 °C) has not been used for electricity generation despite efforts by ORC companies, mainly because the Carnot efficiency is rather low (max. 18% for 90 °C heating and 20 °C cooling, minus losses, typically ending up with 5-7% net electricity).
- Waste heat of medium (100-650 °C) and high (>650 °C) temperature could be used for the generation of electricity or mechanical work via different capturing processes.
- Waste heat recovery system can also be used to fulfill refrigeration requirements of a trailer (for example). The configuration is easy as only a waste heat recovery boiler and absorption cooler is required. Furthermore, only low pressures and temperatures needed to be handled.

== Advantages ==
The recovery process will add to the efficiency of the process and thus decrease the costs of fuel and energy consumption needed for that process.

=== Indirect benefits ===
- Reduced pollution: Thermal pollution and air pollution will dramatically decrease since less flue gases of high temperature are emitted from the plant since most of the energy is recycled.
- Reduced equipment sizes: As fuel consumption reduces, the control and security equipment for handling the fuel decreases. Also, filtering equipment for the gas is no longer needed in large sizes.
- Reduced auxiliary energy consumption: Reduced equipment sizes means another reduction in the energy fed to those systems like pumps, filters, fans,...etc.

== Disadvantages ==
- Capital cost to implement a waste heat recovery system may outweigh the benefit gained in heat recovered. It is necessary to put a cost to the heat being offset.
- Often waste heat is of low quality (temperature). It can be difficult to efficiently utilize the quantity of low quality heat contained in a waste heat medium.
- Heat exchangers tend to be larger to recover significant quantities which increases capital cost.
- Maintenance of equipment: Additional equipment requires additional maintenance cost.
- Units add size and mass to overall power unit. Especially a consideration on the mobile power units of vehicles.

== Examples ==
- The Cyclone Waste Heat Engine is designed to generate electricity from recovered waste heat energy using a steam cycle.
- International Wastewater Heat Exchange Systems is another company addressing waste heat recovery systems. Focused on multi-unit residential, publicly shared buildings, industrial applications and district energy systems, their systems use the energy in waste water for domestic hot water production, building space heating and cooling.
- Motorsport series Formula One introduced waste heat recovery units in 2014 under the name MGU-H.

== See also ==
- Cogeneration or combined heat and power (CHP)
- Heat recovery steam generator and organic Rankine cycle
- Electric turbo compound
- Exhaust heat recovery system
- Thermal oxidizer
- Pinch analysis
- Waste-to-energy plant
