= Heat recovery ventilation =

Method of reusing thermal energy in a building

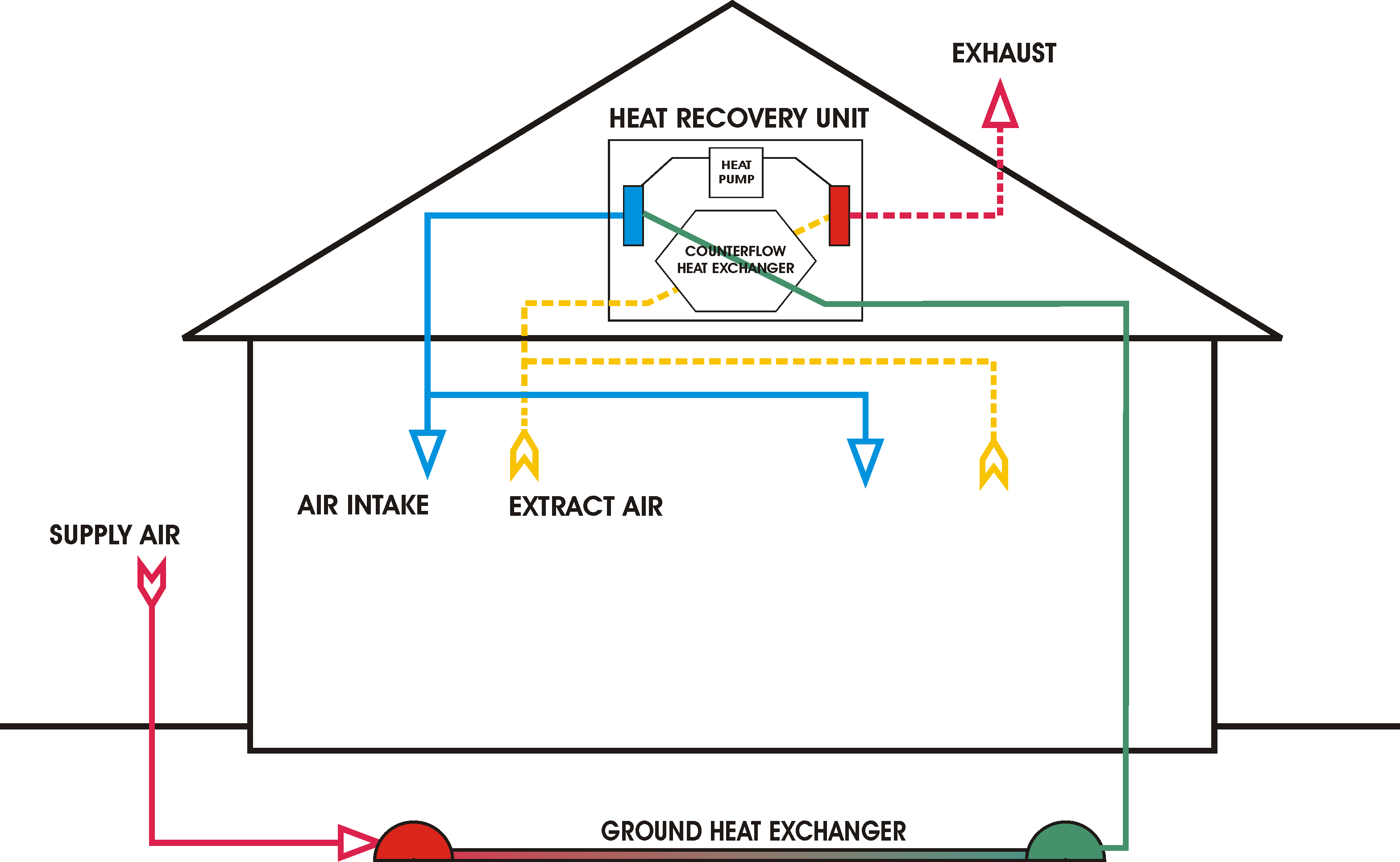
Ventilation unit with heat pump & ground heat exchanger - cooling.

Heat recovery ventilation (HRV), also known as mechanical ventilation heat recovery (MVHR) is a ventilation system that recovers energy by operating between two air sources at different temperatures. It is used to reduce the heating and cooling demands of buildings.

By recovering the residual heat in the exhaust gas, the fresh air introduced into the air conditioning system is preheated (or pre-cooled) before it enters the room, or the air cooler of the air conditioning unit performs heat and moisture treatment. A typical heat recovery system in buildings comprises a core unit, channels for fresh and exhaust air, and blower fans. Building exhaust air is used as either a heat source or heat sink, depending on the climate conditions, time of year, and requirements of the building. Heat recovery systems typically recover about 60–95% of the heat in the exhaust air and have significantly improved the energy efficiency of buildings.

Energy recovery ventilation (ERV) is the energy recovery process in residential and commercial HVAC systems that exchanges the energy contained in normally exhausted air of a building or conditioned space, using it to treat (precondition) the incoming outdoor ventilation air. The specific equipment involved may be called an Energy Recovery Ventilator, also commonly referred to simply as an ERV.

An ERV is a type of air-to-air heat exchanger that transfers latent heat as well as sensible heat. Because both temperature and moisture are transferred, ERVs are described as total enthalpic devices. In contrast, a heat recovery ventilator (HRV) can only transfer sensible heat. HRVs can be considered sensible only devices because they only exchange sensible heat. In other words, all ERVs are HRVs, but not all HRVs are ERVs. It is incorrect to use the terms HRV, AAHX (air-to-air heat exchanger), and ERV interchangeably.

During the warmer seasons, an ERV system pre-cools and dehumidifies; during cooler seasons the system humidifies and pre-heats. An ERV system helps HVAC design meet ventilation and energy standards (e.g., ASHRAE), improves indoor air quality and reduces total HVAC equipment capacity, thereby reducing energy consumption. ERV systems enable an HVAC system to maintain a 40-50% indoor relative humidity, essentially in all conditions. ERV's must use power for a blower to overcome the pressure drop in the system, hence incurring a slight energy demand.

== Working principle ==
A heat recovery system is designed to supply conditioned air to the occupied space to maintain a certain temperature. A heat recovery system helps keep a house ventilated while recovering heat being emitted from the inside environment. The purpose of heat recovery systems is to transfer the thermal energy from one fluid to another fluid, from one fluid to a solid, or from a solid surface to a fluid at different temperatures and in thermal contact. There is no direct interaction between fluid and fluid or fluid and solid in most heat recovery systems. In some heat recovery systems, fluid leakage is observed due to pressure differences between fluids, resulting in a mixture of the two fluids.The purpose of an energy recovery system is to reduce the energy required for heating, cooling, or ventilating the space by repurposing the exhaust air's energy.

== Types ==
=== Thermal wheel ===
Diagramatic operation of a thermal wheel

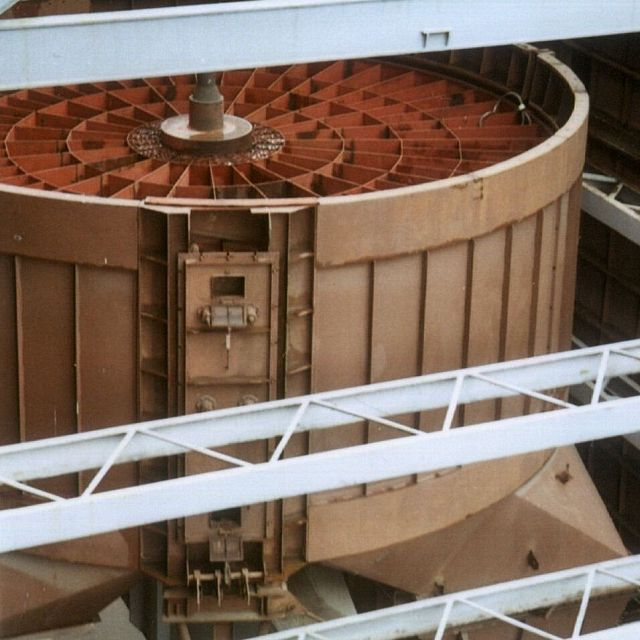
Ljungström air preheater by Swedish engineer Fredrik Ljungström (1875–1964)

A thermal wheel, also known as a rotary heat exchanger, or rotary air-to-air enthalpy wheel, energy recovery wheel, or heat recovery wheel, is a type of energy recovery heat exchanger positioned within the supply and exhaust air streams of air-handling units or rooftop units or in the exhaust gases of an industrial process, in order to recover the heat energy. Other variants include enthalpy wheels and desiccant wheels. A cooling-specific thermal wheel is sometimes referred to as a Kyoto wheel.

Rotary thermal wheels are a mechanical means of heat recovery. A rotating porous metallic wheel transfers thermal energy from one air stream to another by passing through each fluid alternately. The system operates by working as a thermal storage mass whereby the heat from the air is temporarily stored within the wheel matrix until it is transferred to the cooler air stream.

Two types of rotary thermal wheels exist: heat wheels and enthalpy (desiccant) wheels. Though there is a geometrical similarity between heat and enthalpy wheels, there are differences that affect the operation of each design. In a system using a desiccant wheel, the moisture in the air stream with the highest relative humidity is transferred to the opposite air stream after flowing through the wheel. This can work in both directions of incoming air to exhaust air and exhaust air to incoming air. The supply air can then be used directly or employed to further cool the air. This is an energy-intensive process.

The rotary air-to-air enthalpy wheel heat exchanger is a rotating cylinder filled with an air permeable material, typically polymer, aluminum, or synthetic fiber, providing the large surface area required for the sensible enthalpy transfer (enthalpy is a measure of heat). As the wheel rotates between the supply and exhaust air streams it picks up heat energy and releases it into the colder air stream. The driving force behind the exchange is the difference in temperatures between the opposing air streams (the thermal gradient).

The enthalpy exchange is accomplished through the use of desiccants. Desiccants transfer moisture through the process of adsorption which is predominately driven by the difference in the partial pressure of vapor within the opposing air-streams. Typical desiccants consist of silica gel, and molecular sieves.

Enthalpy wheels are the most effective devices to transfer both latent and sensible heat energy. Choice of construction materials for the rotor, most commonly polymer, aluminum, or fiberglass, determines durability.

When using rotary energy recovery devices the two air streams must be adjacent to one another to allow for the local transfer of energy. Also, there should be special considerations paid in colder climates to avoid wheel frosting. Systems can avoid frosting by modulating wheel speed, preheating the air, or stop/jogging the system.

O’Connor et al. studied the effect that a rotary thermal wheel has on the supply air flow rates into a building. A computational model was created to simulate the effects of a rotary thermal wheel on air flow rates when incorporated into a commercial wind tower system. The simulation was validated with a scale model experiment in a closed-loop subsonic wind tunnel. The data obtained from both tests were compared in order to analyze the flow rates. Although the flow rates were reduced compared to a wind tower which did not include a rotary thermal wheel, the guideline ventilation rates for occupants in a school or office building were met above an external wind speed of 3 m/s, which is lower than the average wind speed of the UK (4–5 m/s).

No full-scale experimental or field test data was completed in this study, therefore it cannot be conclusively proved that rotary thermal wheels are feasible for integration into a commercial wind tower system. However, despite the air flow rate decrease within the building after the introduction of the rotary thermal wheel, the reduction was not large enough to prevent the ventilation guideline rates from being met. Sufficient research has not yet been conducted to determine the suitability of rotary thermal wheels in natural ventilation, ventilation supply rates can be met but the thermal capabilities of the rotary thermal wheel have not yet been investigated. Further work would beneficial to increase understanding of the system.

=== Fixed plate heat exchanger ===
Types of heat exchangers.

Fixed plate heat exchangers have no moving parts, and consist of alternating layers of plates that are separated and sealed. Typical flow is cross current and since the majority of plates are solid and non permeable, sensible only transfer is the result.

The tempering of incoming fresh air is done by a heat or energy recovery core. In this case, the core is made of aluminum or plastic plates. Humidity levels are adjusted through the transferring of water vapor. This is done with a rotating wheel either containing a desiccant material or permeable plates.

Enthalpy plates were introduced in 2006 by Paul, a special company for ventilation systems for passive houses. A crosscurrent countercurrent air-to-air heat exchanger built with a humidity permeable material. Polymer fixed-plate countercurrent energy recovery ventilators were introduced in 1998 by Building Performance Equipment (BPE), a residential, commercial, and industrial air-to-air energy recovery manufacturer. These heat exchangers can be both introduced as a retrofit for increased energy savings and fresh air as well as an alternative to new construction. In new construction situations, energy recovery will effectively reduce the required heating/cooling capacity of the system. The percentage of the total energy saved will depend on the efficiency of the device (up to 90% sensible) and the latitude of the building.

Due to the need to use multiple sections, fixed plate energy exchangers are often associated with high pressure drop and larger footprints. Due to their inability to offer a high amount of latent energy transfer these systems also have a high chance of frosting in colder climates.

The technology patented by Finnish company RecyclingEnergy Int. Corp. is based on a regenerative plate heat exchanger taking advantage of humidity of air by cyclical condensation and evaporation, e.g. latent heat, enabling not only high annual thermal efficiency but also microbe-free plates due to self-cleaning/washing method. Therefore, the unit is called an enthalpy recovery ventilator rather than heat or energy recovery ventilator. Company's patented LatentHeatPump is based on its enthalpy recovery ventilator having COP of 33 in the summer and 15 in the winter.

Fixed plate heat exchangers are the most commonly used type of heat exchanger and have been developed for 40 years. Thin metal plates are stacked with a small spacing between plates. Two different air streams pass through these spaces, adjacent to each other. Heat transfer occurs as the temperature transfers through the plate from one air stream to the other. The efficiency of these devices has reached 90% sensible heat efficiency in transferring sensible heat from one air stream to another. The high levels of efficiency are attributed to the high heat transfer coefficients of the materials used, operational pressure and temperature range.

=== Heat pipes ===
Heat pipes are a heat recovery device that uses a multi-phase process to transfer heat from one air stream to another. Heat is transferred using an evaporator and condenser within a wicked, sealed pipe containing a fluid which undergoes a constant phase change to transfer heat. The fluid within the pipes changes from a fluid to a gas in the evaporator section, absorbing the thermal energy from the warm air stream. The gas condenses back to a fluid in the condenser section where the thermal energy is dissipated into the cooler air stream raising the temperature. The fluid/gas is transported from one side of the heat pipe to the other through pressure, wick forces or gravity, depending on the arrangement of the heat pipe.

=== Run-around ===
Run-around systems are hybrid heat recovery system that incorporates characteristics from other heat recovery technology to form a single device, capable of recovering heat from one air stream and delivering to another a significant distance away. The general case of run-around heat recovery, two fixed plate heat exchangers are located in two separate air streams and are linked by a closed loop containing a fluid that is continually pumped between the two heat exchangers. The fluid is heated and cooled constantly as it flows around the loop, providing heat recovery. The constant flow of the fluid through the loop requires pumps to move between the two heat exchangers. Though this is an additional energy demand, using pumps to circulate fluid is less energy intensive than fans to circulate air.

=== Phase change materials ===
Phase change materials, or PCMs, are a technology that is used to store sensible and latent heat within a building structure at a higher storage capacity than standard building materials. PCMs have been studied extensively due to their ability to store heat and transfer heating and cooling demands from conventional peak times to off-peak times.

The concept of the thermal mass of a building for heat storage, that the physical structure of the building absorbs heat to help cool the air, has long been understood and investigated. A study of PCMs in comparison to traditional building materials has shown that the thermal storage capacity of PCMs is twelve times higher than standard building materials over the same temperature range. The pressure drop across PCMs has not been investigated to be able to comment on the effect that the material may have on air streams. However, as the PCM can be incorporated directly into the building structure, this would not affect the flow in the same way other heat exchanger technologies do, it can be suggested that there is no pressure loss created by the inclusion of PCMs in the building fabric.

=== Fixed-bed regenerators ===
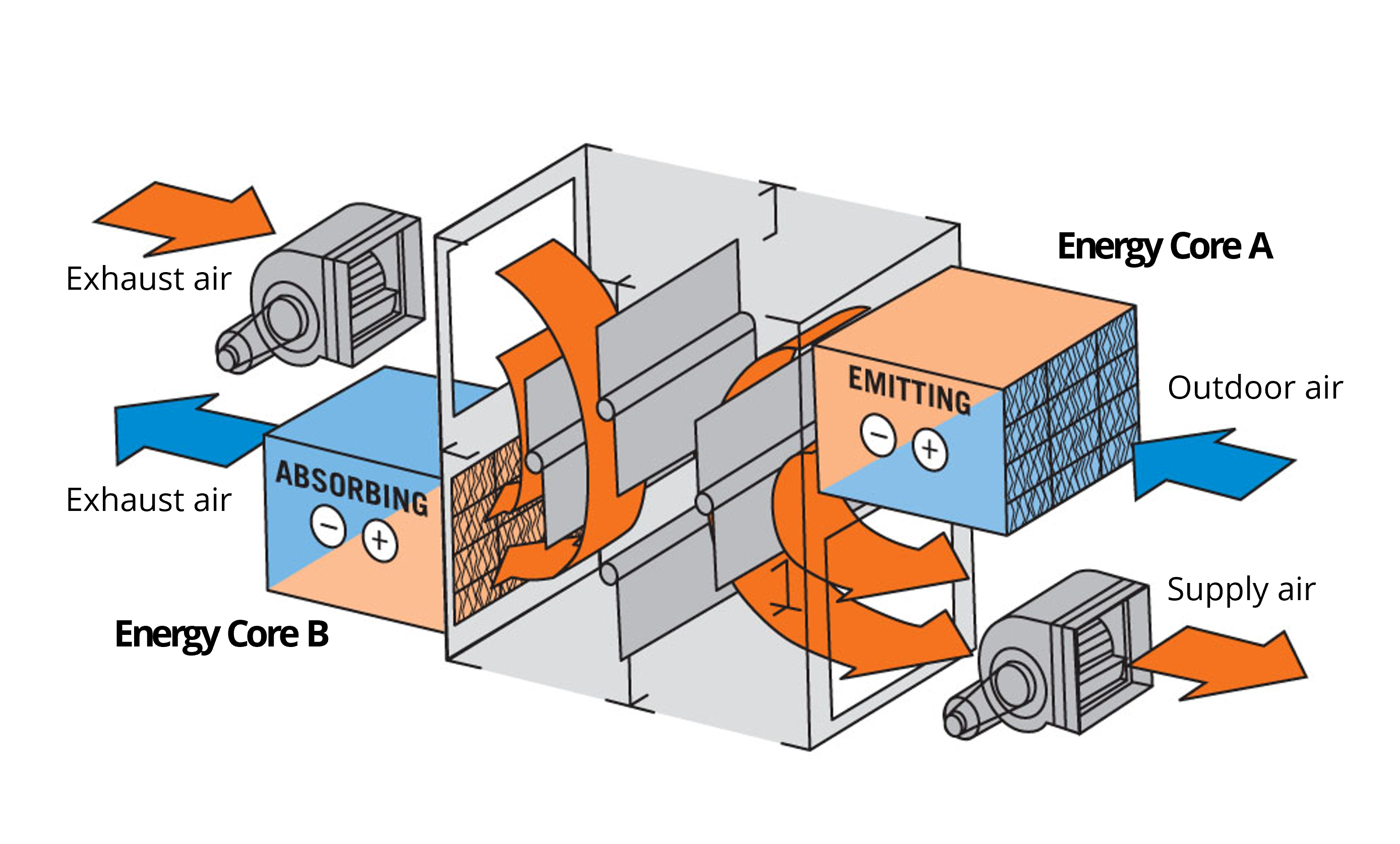
Double-Core Recovery phase 1.

Fixed-bed regenerators (FBR) are exchangers where one or more stationary matrices are charged with energy from discharge air and transfer it to alternating flows of supply and exhaust air.

Building on this principle, FBRs serve as heat recovery ventilator (HRV) that help reduce the energy consumption of HVAC systems by pre-conditioning incoming fresh air with high apparent sensible effectiveness.

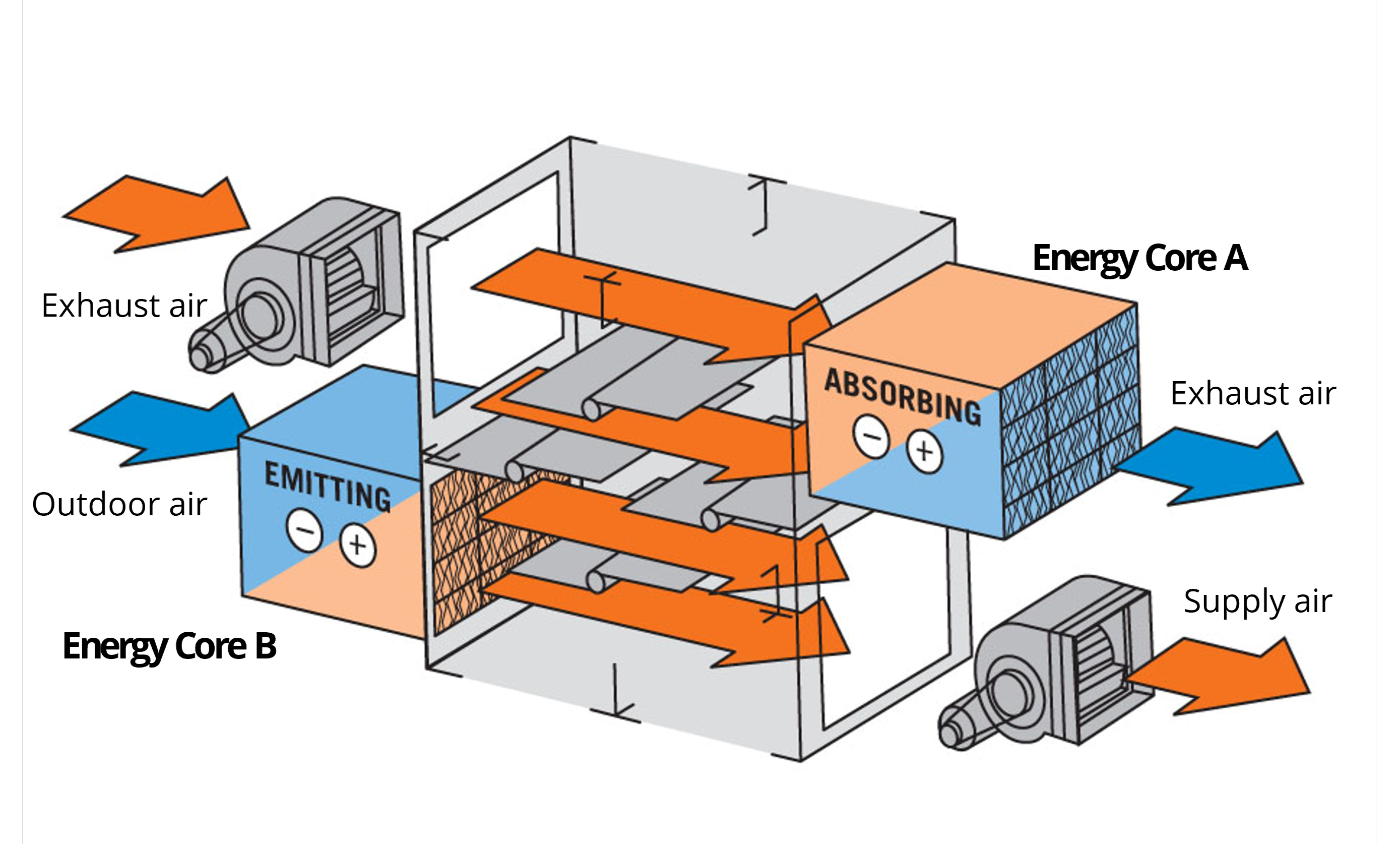
Double-Core Recovery phase 2.

FBRs come in a variety of sizes and configurations to suit different airflow demands. They operate using one or two cores to accomplish energy transfer, reversing the direction of airflow during each recovery cycle. While single-core systems are more common in Europe, double-core systems, such as the patented DualCore® and DualCorePlus™ technologies by Tempeff Inc., are more prevalent in North America.

To improve handling, cleaning, and transport, cores are often divided into smaller cells. Most are made of aluminum, though polypropylene alternatives are available for lightweight or corrosion sensitive environments. The plates within each cell can have varying spacer textures, corrugation patterns, and thickness, typically spaced 0.1 to 0.5 inches apart.

Airflow is managed by damper systems (either multiblade dampers or single deflector plates) which rapidly switch flow direction between the two stationary exchangers. During each cycle, one core delivers fresh, conditioned air while the other core exhausts stale air. The airflow is reversed so that the cores can recover after a period which usually ranges from 50 to 70 seconds. This alternating pattern enables continuous ventilation with high energy recovery performance.

Some FBRs are also designed for latent recovery in heating mode. Applying a desiccant coating to the exchanger surfaces enables moisture transfer in a wide range of environmental conditions. In desiccant-treated FBRs, latent effectiveness typically ranges from 60% to 80%, whereas untreated systems may achieve up to 70%.

In free cooling mode, recovery periods may extend to 3 hours. Certain FBRs use varying recovery times, ranging from 20 to 120 seconds, to regulate the temperature and moisture content of exhaust air. Shorter cycles can improve overall heat exchange efficiency by increasing air transfer rates.

== Applications ==
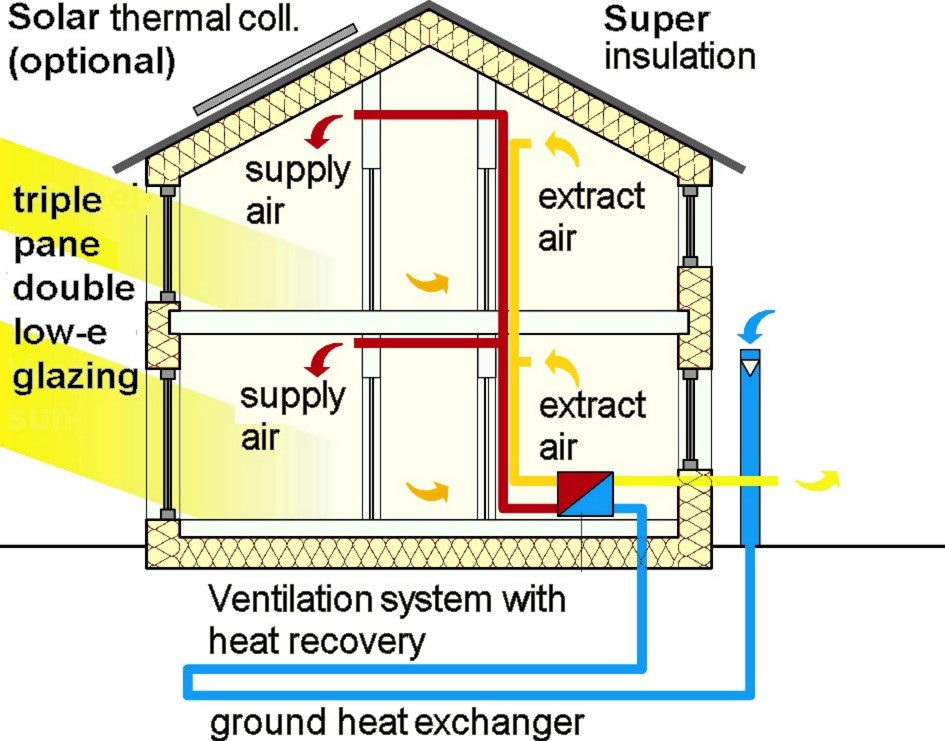
Heat recovery ventilation with an earth-to-air heat exchanger, which is essential to achieve German Passivhaus standards.

=== Fixed plate heat exchangers ===
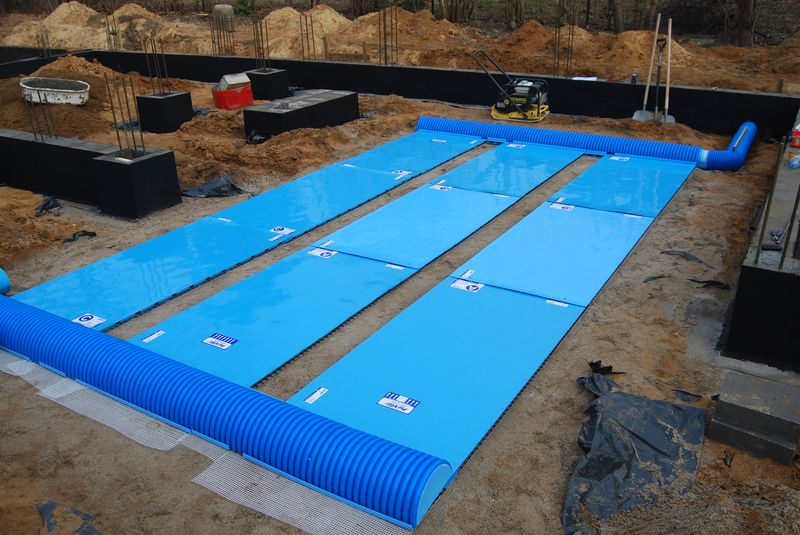
Plate ground heat exchanger inside the foundation walls.

Mardiana et al. integrated a fixed plate heat exchanger into a commercial wind tower, highlighting the advantages of this type of system as a means of zero energy ventilation which can be simply modified. Full scale laboratory testing was undertaken in order to determine the effects and efficiency of the combined system. A wind tower was integrated with a fixed plate heat exchanger and was mounted centrally in a sealed test room.

The results from this study indicate that the combination of a wind tower passive ventilation system and a fixed plate heat recovery device could provide an effective combined technology to recover waste heat from exhaust air and cool incoming warm air with zero energy demand. Though no quantitative data for the ventilation rates within the test room was provided, it can be assumed that due to the high-pressure loss across the heat exchanger that these were significantly reduced from the standard operation of a wind tower. Further investigation of this combined technology is essential in understanding the air flow characteristics of the system.

=== Heat pipes ===
Due to the low-pressure loss of heat pipe systems, more research has been conducted into the integration of this technology into passive ventilation than other heat recovery systems. Commercial wind towers were again used as the passive ventilation system for integrating this heat recovery technology. This further enhances the suggestion that commercial wind towers provide a worthwhile alternative to mechanical ventilation, capable of supplying and exhausting air at the same time.

=== Run-around systems ===
Flaga-Maryanczyk et al. conducted a study in Sweden which examined a passive ventilation system which integrated a run-around system using a ground source heat pump as the heat source to warm incoming air. Experimental measurements and weather data were taken from the passive house used in the study. A CFD model of the passive house was created with the measurements taken from the sensors and weather station used as input data. The model was run to calculate the effectiveness of the run-around system and the capabilities of the ground source heat pump.

Ground source heat pumps provide a reliable source of consistent thermal energy when buried 10–20 m below the ground surface. The ground temperature is warmer than the ambient air in winter and cooler than the ambient air in summer, providing both a heat source and a heat sink. It was found that in February, the coldest month in the climate, the ground source heat pump was capable of delivering almost 25% of the heating needs of the house and occupants.

=== Phase change materials ===
The majority of research interest in PCMs is the application of phase change material integration into traditional porous building materials such as concrete and wall boards. Kosny et al. analyzed the thermal performance of buildings that have PCM-enhanced construction materials within the structure. Analysis showed that the addition of PCMs is beneficial in terms of improving thermal performance.

A significant drawback of PCM used in a passive ventilation system for heat recovery is the lack of instantaneous heat transfer across different airstreams. Phase change materials are a heat storage technology, whereby the heat is stored within the PCM until the air temperature has fallen to a significant level where it can be released back into the air stream. No research has been conducted into the use of PCMs between two airstreams of different temperatures where continuous, instantaneous heat transfer can occur. An investigation into this area would be beneficial for passive ventilation heat recovery research.

=== Fixed-bed regenerators ===
Fixed-bed regenerator (FBR) were originally used for heat recovery in high-temperature industrial processes. More recently, they are attracting interest in the HVAC sector as an effective strategy for a low-maintenance energy recovery solution that reduces energy consumption, greenhouse gas emissions, and HVAC system load.

Modern buildings are becoming increasingly airtight, reducing energy loss and air infiltration. While this improves energy efficiency, it also increases the need to ventilate spaces to maintain indoor air quality, which often requires large amounts of energy.

In this scenario, FBRs offer an effective solution, as they recover energy from the exhaust air and use it to precondition the incoming fresh air. This reduces the heating and cooling demand on the HVAC system. Depending on the building design and airflow requirements, single-core or double-core FBRs can be used to efficiently meet ventilation needs. Some designs can operate year-round without frost buildup, avoiding the energy loss typically caused by defrost cycles.

Single-core FBRs are often used in smaller residential settings, especially when ceiling space is limited or the ventilation system is room-based, decentralized, and ductless. These units often include a ceramic honeycomb core and may use one or two fans, along with airflow control components like backdraft flaps and deflectors, to manage bidirectional airflow.

Double-core systems, such as DualCore® and DualCorePlus™, are built for large-scale ventilation needs, with airflow capacities ranging from 50 to 100,000 cubic feet per minute (cfm). They are commonly installed in industrial, commercial, and large residential buildings. Although their cost and size may be limiting standard homes, they are suitable for high-demand applications where performance and reliability are essential.

The ability of double-core FBRs to function in extremely cold temperatures—down to -40 °F—without the need for defrost cycles or performance derating is a significant advantage. To condition supply air before it enters the building, these systems are frequently integrated with air handling units.

== Advantages and disadvantages ==
Type of HRV	Advantages	Disadvantages	Performance parameters	Efficiency %	Pressure drop (Pa)	Humidity control
Rotary thermal wheel	High efficiency Sensible and latent heat recovery Compact design Frost control available	Cross contamination possible Requires adjacent airstreams Mechanically driven, requiring energy input	Rotation speed Air velocity Wheel porosity	80+	4-45	Yes
Fixed plate	No moving parts hence high reliability High heat transfer coefficient No cross contamination Frost control possible Sensible and latent heat recovery	High pressure loss across exchanger Limited to two separate air streams Condensation build up Frost building up in cold climates	Material type Operating pressure Temperature Flow arrangement	70-90	7-30	Yes
Heat pipes	No moving parts, high reliability No cross contamination Low pressure loss Compact design Heat recovery in two directions possible	Requires close air streams Internal fluid should match local climate conditions	Fluid type Contact time Arrangement/configuration Structure	80	1-5	No
Run-around	Airstreams can be separate No cross contamination Low pressure loss Multiple sources of heat recovery	Multiple pumps required to move fluid Difficult to integrate into existing structures Low efficiency Cost	Exchanger type Fluid type Heat source	50-80	~1	No
Phase change materials	Easy incorporation into building materials Offset peak energy demands No pressure loss No cross contamination No moving parts Long life cycle	Thermal storage as opposed to instantaneous transfer Expensive Not proven technology Difficulty in selecting appropriate material	Impregnation method	~	0	No
Fixed-bed Regenerators	Few moving parts. Can operate in frigid climates without any auxiliary defrost strategies. High sensible effectiveness.	Quasi-steady state performance. Temperature and moisture level of the outlet air vary with time.	Capacity rate of the working fluid. The desiccant's physical and thermal characteristics. Heat and moisture transfer area. Recovery period.	70-90	~	Yes

=== Types of energy recovery devices ===
Energy recovery device	Type of transfer
Rotary enthalpy wheel	Total and sensible
Fixed plate	Total** and sensible
Heat pipe	Sensible
Run around coil	Sensible
Thermosiphon	Sensible
Twin towers	Sensible

**Total energy exchange only available on hygroscopic units and condensate return units

== Environmental impacts ==
Energy saving is one of the key issues for both fossil fuel consumption and the protection of the global environment. The rising cost of energy and global warming underlined that developing improved energy systems is necessary to increase energy efficiency while reducing greenhouse gas emissions. One of the most effective ways to reduce energy demand is to use energy more efficiently. As of 2015, waste heat recovery is becoming popular since it improves energy efficiency. About 26% of industrial energy is still wasted as hot gas or fluid in many countries. However, there has been attention to recover waste heat from various industries and to optimize the units which are used to absorb heat from waste gases. Thus, these attempts enhance reducing of global warming as well as of energy demand.

=== Energy consumption ===
In most industrialized countries, HVAC is responsible for one-third of the total energy consumption. Moreover, cooling and dehumidifying fresh ventilation air compose 20–40% of the total energy load for HVAC in hot and humid climatic regions. However, that percentage can be higher where 100% fresh air ventilation is required. This means more energy is needed to meet the fresh air requirements of the occupants. Heat recovery is becoming more necessary due to an increased energy cost for the treatment of fresh air. The main purpose of heat recovery systems is to mitigate the energy consumption of buildings for heating, cooling, and ventilation by recovering the waste heat. In this regard, stand-alone or combined heat recovery systems can be incorporated into residential or commercial buildings for energy saving. Reduction in energy consumption levels can also notably contribute in reducing greenhouse gas emissions.

== Energy recovery ventilation ==
=== Importance ===
Nearly half of global energy is used in buildings,and half of heating/cooling cost is caused by ventilation when it is done by the "open window" method according to the regulations. Secondly, energy generation and grid is made to meet the peak demand of power. To use proper ventilation; recovery is a cost-efficient, sustainable and quick way to reduce global energy consumption and give better indoor air quality (IAQ) and protect buildings, and environment.

=== Methods of transfer ===
During the cooling season, the system works to cool and dehumidify the incoming, outside air. To do this, the system takes the rejected heat and sends it into the exhaust airstream. Subsequently, this air cools the condenser coil at a lower temperature than if the rejected heat had not entered the exhaust airstream. During the heating seasons, the system works in reverse. Instead of discharging the heat into the exhaust airstream, the system draws heat from the exhaust airstream in order to pre-heat the incoming air. At this stage, the air passes through a primary unit and then into the space being conditioned. With this type of system, it is normal during the cooling seasons for the exhaust air to be cooler than the ventilation air and, during the heating seasons, warmer than the ventilation air. It is for this reason the system works efficiently and effectively. The coefficient of performance (COP) will increase as the conditions become more extreme (i.e., more hot and humid for cooling and colder for heating).

=== Efficiency ===
The efficiency of an ERV system is the ratio of energy transferred between the two air streams compared with the total energy transported through the heat exchanger.

With the variety of products on the market, efficiency will vary as well. Some of these systems have been known to have heat exchange efficiencies as high as 70-80% while others have as low as 50%. Even though this lower figure is preferable to the basic HVAC system, it is not up to par with the rest of its class. Studies are being done to increase the heat transfer efficiency to 90%.

The use of modern low-cost gas-phase heat exchanger technology will allow for significant improvements in efficiency. The use of high conductivity porous material is believed to produce an exchange effectiveness in excess of 90%, producing a five times improvement in energy recovery.

The Home Ventilating Institute (HVI) has developed a standard test for any and all units manufactured within the United States. Regardless, not all have been tested. It is imperative to investigate efficiency claims, comparing data produced by HVI as well as that produced by the manufacturer. (Note: all units sold in Canada are placed through the R-2000 program, a standard test equivalent to the HVI test).

== Exhaust air heat pump ==
An exhaust air heat pump (EAHP) extracts heat from the exhaust air of a building and transfers the heat to the supply air, hot tap water and/or hydronic heating system (underfloor heating, radiators). This requires at least mechanical exhaust but mechanical supply is optional; see mechanical ventilation. This type of heat pump requires a certain air exchange rate to maintain its output power. Since the inside air is approximately 20–22 degrees Celsius all year round, the maximum output power of the heat pump is not varying with the seasons and outdoor temperature.

Air leaving the building when the heat pump's compressor is running is usually at around −1° in most versions. Thus, the unit is extracting heat from the air that needs to be changed (at a rate of around a half an air change per hour). Air entering the house is of course generally warmer than the air processed through the unit so there is a net 'gain'. Care must be taken that these are only used in the correct type of houses. Exhaust air heat pumps have minimum flow rates so that when installed in a small flat, the airflow chronically over-ventilates the flat and increases the heat loss by drawing in large amounts of unwanted outside air. There are some models though that can take in additional outdoor air to negate this and this air is also feed to the compressor to avoid over ventilation.For most earlier exhaust air heat pumps there will be a low heat output to the hot water and heating of just around 1.8 kW from the compressor/heat pump process, but if that falls short of the building's requirements additional heat will be automatically triggered in the form of immersion heaters or an external gas boiler. The immersion heater top-up could be substantial ( if you select the wrong unit), and when a unit with a 6 kW immersion heater operates at the full output it will cost £1 per hour to run.

== Issues ==
Between 2009 and 2013, some 15,000 brand new social homes were built in the UK with NIBE EAHPs used as primary heating. Owners and housing association tenants reported crippling electric bills. High running costs are usual with exhaust air heat pumps and should be expected, due to the very small heat recovery with these units. Typically the ventilation air stream is around 31 litres per second and the heat recovery is 750W and no more. All additional heat necessary to provide heating and hot water is from electricity, either compressor electrical input or immersion heater. At outside temperatures below 0 degrees Celsius, this type of heat pump removes more heat from a home than it supplies. Over a year around 60% of the energy input to a property with an exhaust air heat pump will be from electricity.

Many families are still battling with developers to have their EAHP systems replaced with more reliable and efficient heating, noting the success of residents in Coventry.

== See also ==
- Dedicated outdoor air system
- Energy recycling – Process of using energy that would normally be wasted
- List of low-energy building techniques
