= British Glass Industry Research Association =

Glass research organisation in the UK

- Formation: 9 October 1954; 72 years ago
- Location: Sheffield, UK

The British Glass Industry Research Association (BGIRA) was a research organisation that worked to advance glass-working technology and techniques.

== History ==
The origins of British Glass Industry Research Association (BGIRA) can be traced back to pre-existing organisations, such as the Society of Glass Technology, which functioned as an industrial association.

On 9 October 1954, BGIRA was incorporated as a separate commercial entity. Shortly thereafter, Dr. R. G. Newton was appointed director of research at the association. On 6 June 1959, a purpose-built facility, which included multiple laboratories, was officially opened to house BGIRA.

In the early 1960s, the association had conducted research into the different practices in the operation of British and overseas furnaces, heat transference between glass and the mould (using an early analogue computer), exploration of the batch mixing and handling processes, the use of strain-gauges to determine the uniformity of stress loading across large panels of glass, and demonstrate a three-fold improvement in the strength of abraded unetched samples via different ion-diffusion processes. By this point, the operating costs of BGIRA were rising while income remained static, resulting in headcount reductions being considered.

In the 1970s, BGIRA became actively involved in Britain's recycling system with the aim of reducing volumes sent to landfill. By this point, the association's outputs were being followed by several international organisations, including the Central Intelligence Agency.

In 1988, BGIRA merged with the Glass Manufacturers Federation to form the British Glass Manufacturers' Confederation.
