= Run-around coil =

Type of energy recovery heat exchanger

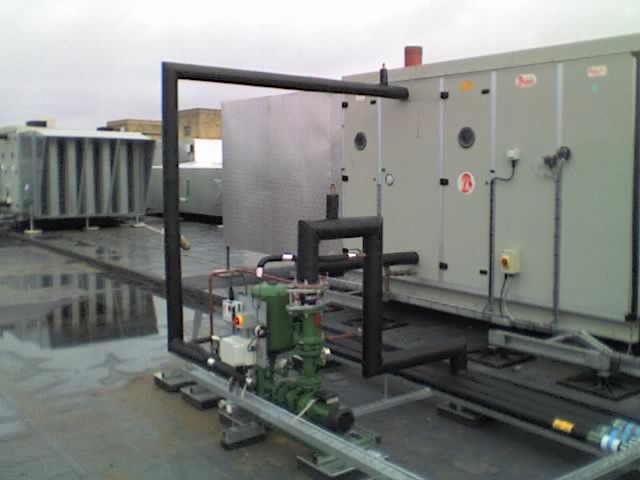
A run-around coil installation, serving air handling units on the roof of an office building

A run-around coil is a type of energy recovery heat exchanger most often positioned within the supply and exhaust air streams of an air handling system, or in the exhaust gases of an industrial process, to recover the heat energy. Generally, it refers to any intermediate stream used to transfer heat between two streams that are not directly connected for reasons of safety or practicality. It may also be referred to as a run-around loop, a pump-around coil or a liquid coupled heat exchanger.

== Description ==
A typical run-around coil system comprises two or more multi-row finned tube coils connected to each other by a pumped pipework circuit. The pipework is charged with a heat exchange fluid, normally water, which picks up heat from the exhaust air coil and gives up heat to the supply air coil before returning again. Thus heat from the exhaust air stream is transferred through the pipework coil to the circulating fluid, and then from the fluid through the pipework coil to the supply air stream.

The use of this system is generally limited to situations where the air streams are separated and no other type of device can be utilised since the heat recovery efficiency is lower than other forms of air-to-air heat recovery. Gross efficiencies are usually in the range of 40 to 50%, but more significantly seasonal efficiencies of this system can be very low, due to the extra electrical energy used by the pumped fluid circuit.

The fluid circuit containing the circulating pump also contains an expansion vessel, to accommodate changes in fluid pressure. In addition, there is a fill device to ensure the system remains charged. There are also controls to bypass and shut down the system when not required, and other safety devices. Pipework runs should be as short as possible, and should be sized for low velocities to minimize frictional losses, hence reducing pump energy consumption. It is possible to recover some of this energy in the form of heat given off by the motor if a glandless pump is used, where a water jacket surrounds the motor stator, thus picking up some of its heat.

The pumped fluid will have to be protected from freezing, and is normally treated with a glycol based anti-freeze. This also reduces the specific heat capacity of the fluid and increases the viscosity, increasing pump power consumption, further reducing the seasonal efficiency of the device. For example, a 20% glycol mixture will provide protection down to −10 °C (14 °F), but will increase system resistance by 15%.

For the finned tube coil design, there is a performance maximum corresponding to an eight- or ten-row coil, above this the fan and pump motor energy consumption increases substantially and seasonal efficiency starts to decrease. The main cause of increased energy consumption lies with the fan, for the same face velocity, fewer coil rows will decrease air pressure drop and increase water pressure drop. The total energy consumption will usually be less than that for a greater number of coil rows with higher air pressure drops and lower water pressure drops.

== Energy transfer process ==
Normally the heat transfer between airstreams provided by the device is termed as 'sensible', which is the exchange of energy, or enthalpy, resulting in a change in temperature of the medium (air in this case), but with no change in moisture content.

== Other types of air-to-air heat exchangers ==
- Thermal wheel, or rotary heat exchanger (including enthalpy wheel and desiccant wheel)
- Recuperator, or cross plate heat exchanger
- Heat pipe

== See also ==
- HVAC
- Energy recovery ventilation
- Heat recovery ventilation
- Regenerative heat exchanger
- Air handler
- Thermal comfort
- Indoor air quality
- CCSI
