= Glass melting furnace =

Oven used to melt raw materials into glass

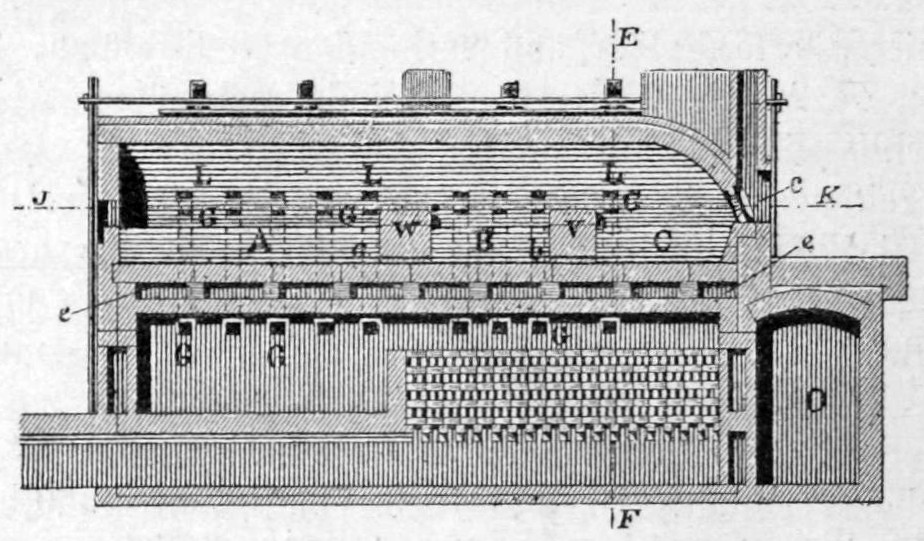
Glass Furnace by Siemens hist. 1878

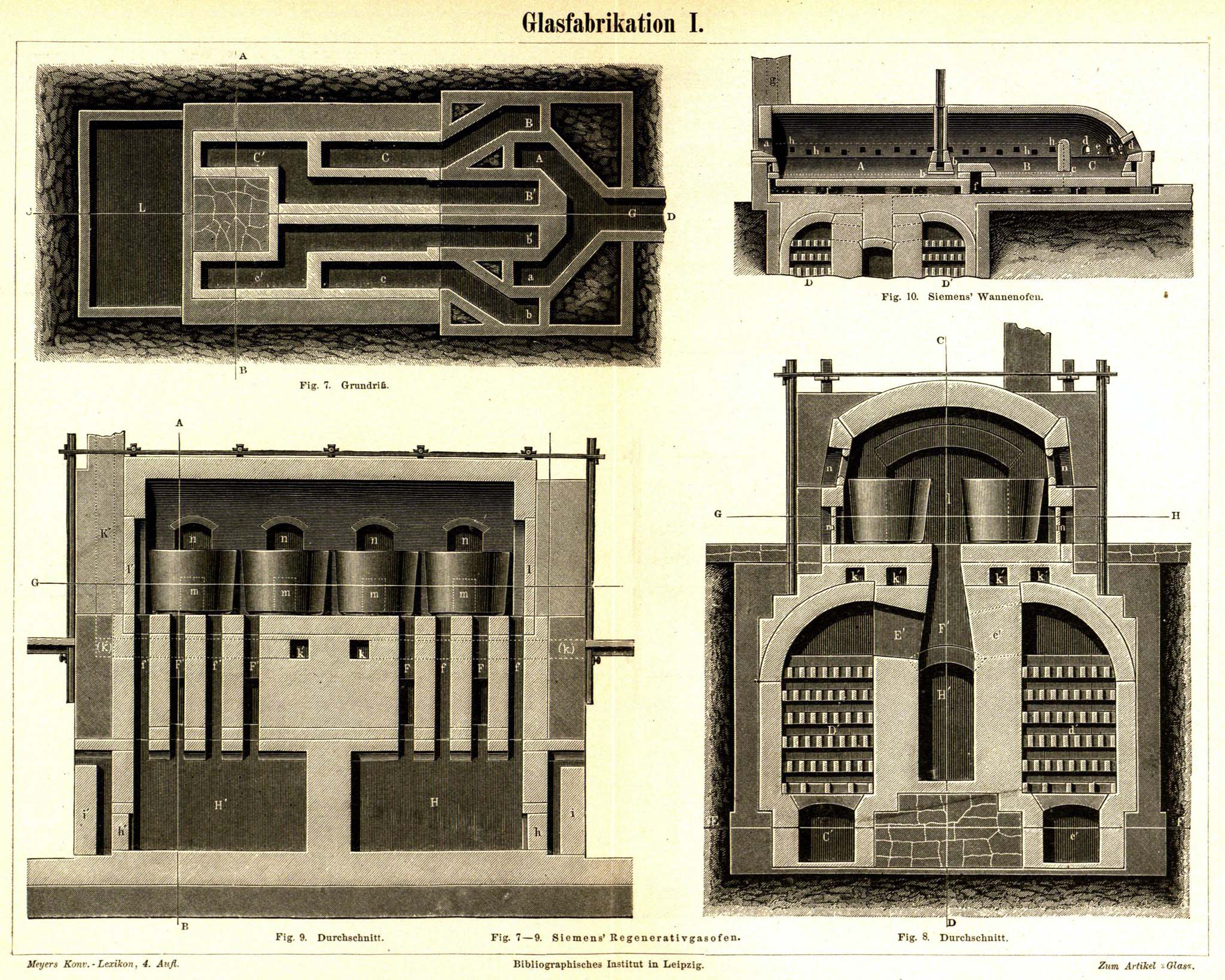
Siemens Regenerator Furnace hist. 1885 in 4 Views

A glass melting furnace is designed to melt raw materials into glass.

Depending on the intended use, there are various designs of glass melting furnaces available. They use different power sources. These sources are mainly fossil fueled or by fully electric power. A combination of both energy sources is also realized. A glass melting furnace is made from a refractory material.

== Basics ==
The glass raw materials are fed to the glass melting tank in batches or continuously. The components (the batch) are melted to form a liquid glass melt. In addition to the basic components, the batch also contains cullet from recycled glass to save energy. The cullet content can be up to approx. 85% - 90% (green glass), depending on the requirements of the desired glass color. When changing the glass color (recoloring), the entire process often takes several days in large glass melting furnaces. For economical operation, the glass melting furnaces are operated around the clock throughout the year for so-called mass glass (hollow glass, flat glass). Apart from one to max. two smaller planned intermediate repairs, during which the furnace is taken out of operation, a so-called furnace journey (campaign) up to the general repair (rebuild) can last up to 16 years and more (depending on the product group). The capacity can range from about one ton to over 2000 tons and the daily throughput can range from a few kilograms to over 1000 tons. The operating temperature inside the furnace, above the so-called glass bath is about 1550 °C. This temperature is determined by the composition of the batch and by the required amount of molten glass - the daily production - as well as the design-related energy losses.

Glass furnaces are operated with a flue gas heat recovery system to increase the energy efficiency.

The reduction in CO_{2} emissions required, due to the climate change mitigation, has led to various concepts to reduce or replace the use of fossil fuels, as well as to avoid the CO_{2} released during the melting of the batch through an increased recycling content.

== Day tanks ==
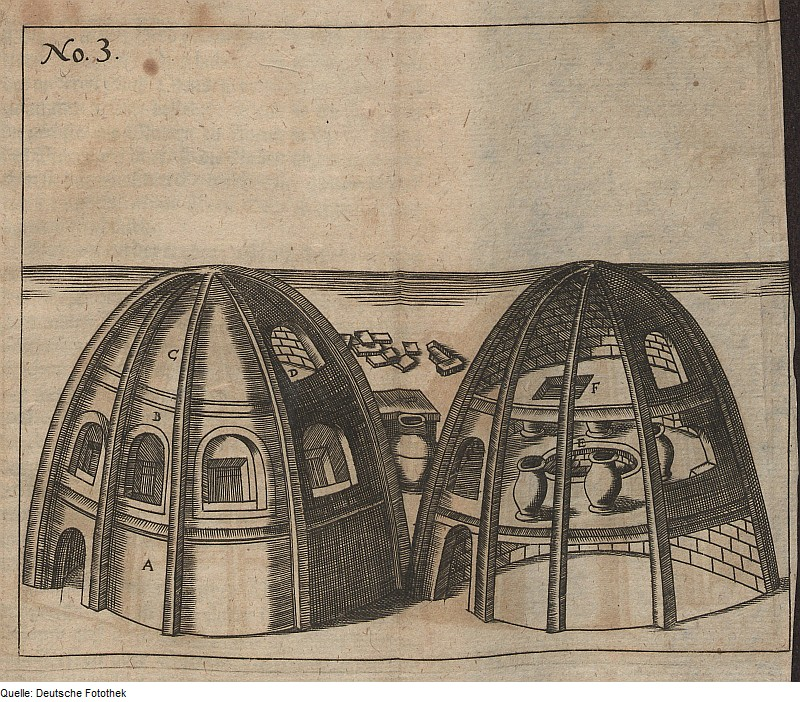
Pot furnace (hist.)

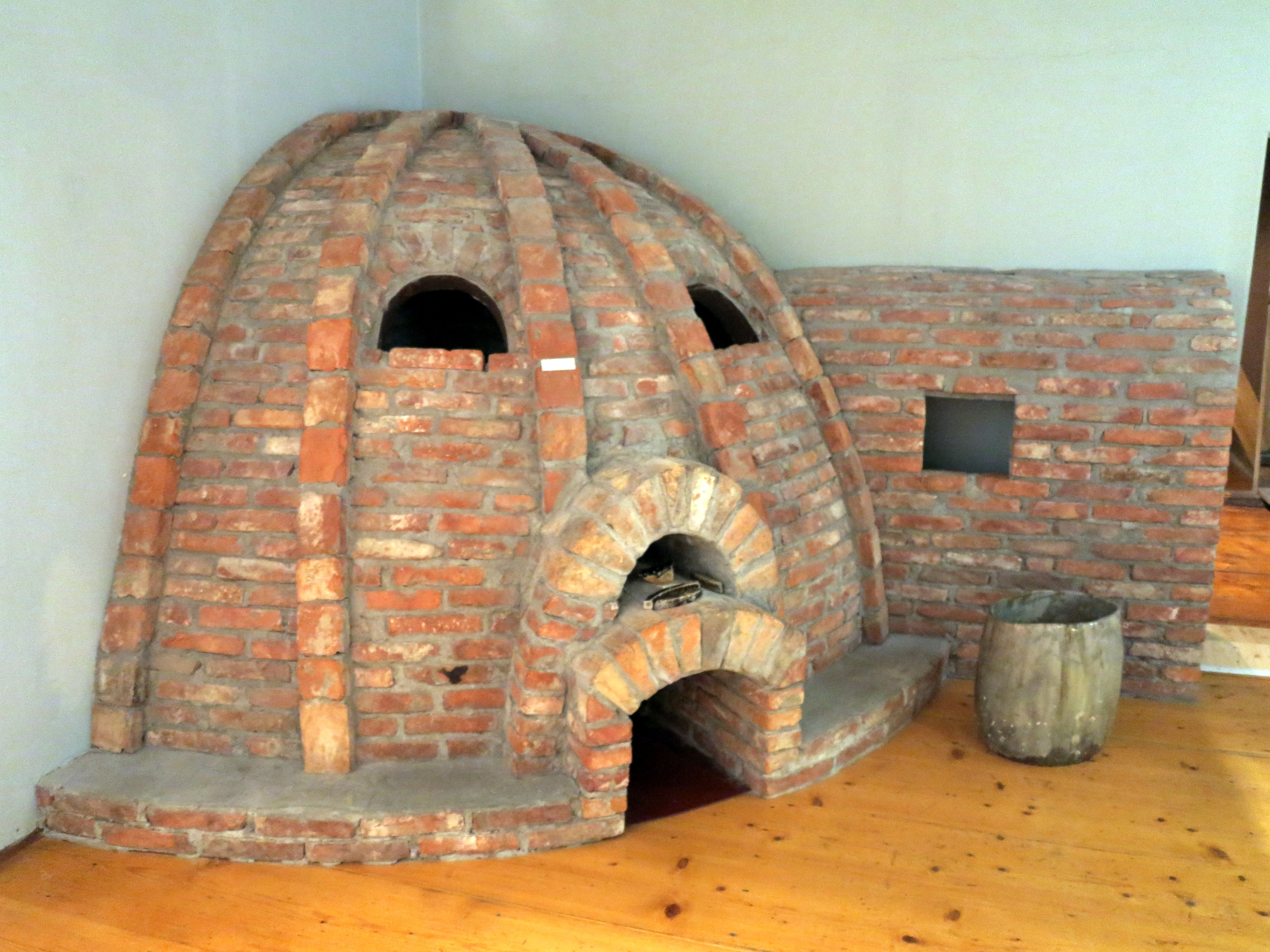
Pot furnace (reconstruction)

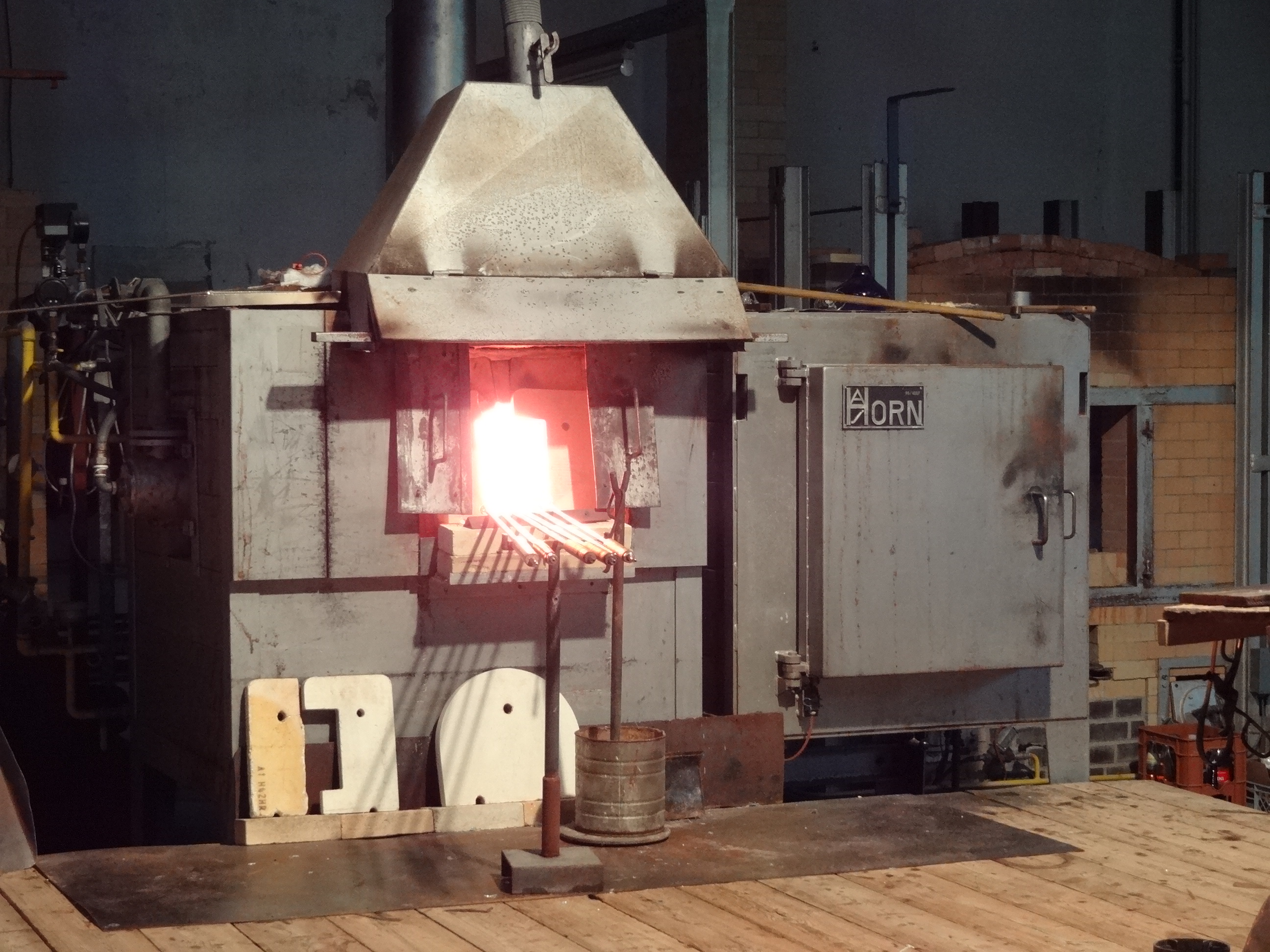
State of the art pot furnace

This historical type of glass melting tank produces in batches (discontinuously); it is used to melt glasses that are only required in small quantities. The maximum melting area of day tanks is 10 m2, and the melting capacity is between 0.4 and 0.8 t/m2 of melting area.

The pot furnace is one type of this. The furnace consists of a refractory masonry basin with a depth of 40 to 60 cm (bottom furnace), which is covered with a vault with a diameter of 70 to 80 cm (top furnace).

At the beginning of the 21st century, day tanks still existed in some mouth glass works and artisan workshops, as well as in some special glass manufacturers, where small quantities of high quality glass are melted, e.g. optical glass.

Day tanks are not taken out of service at the end of the day; the temperature is simply lowered overnight. Since the refractory material typically cannot tolerate large temperature changes and this leads to increased corrosion (consumption) of the same, such rapid cooling cannot occur anyway. If the day tank is taken out of operation, e.g. for maintenance, cooling/heating times (two to several days) must be observed which are adapted to the refractory material. Smaller furnaces (studio furnaces) in artisan studios are excepted. There, the refractory lining is designed accordingly.

== Continuously operated glass melting furnaces ==
Continuously operated furnaces consist of two sections, the melting tank and the working tank. These are separated by a passage or a constriction (float glass). In the melting tank, the batch is melted and refined. The melt then passes through the passage into the working tank and from there into the feeder (forehearth). There the glass is removed. In hollow glass production (hollow glass), the glass machine below is fed with glass gobs. In flat glass production (float glass), the glass is fed at special wide outlets as a glass ribbon over a so-called float bath of liquid tin (for flat glass without structure : e.g. window glass, car glass) or for flat glass with structure over a profiled roller.

The melting tanks are made of refractory materials and consist of groups of alumina (Al_{2}O_{3}), silica (SiO_{2}), magnesia (MgO), Zirconia (ZrO_{2}) as well as combinations of them to produce the necessary refractory ceramic materials. When creating glass melting furnaces (melting tank including regenerative chambers), up to 2000 t of refractory material can be used for the hollow glass sector and up to 9000 t for the flat glass sector. The heat source in 2021 is typically natural gas, heavy and light oil, and electric current fed directly into the glass bath by means of electrodes. Fossil fuel heating is often combined with supplemental electric heating. Fully electrically heated glass melting tanks are also used. Electric heating is possible because, as the temperature of glass rises, it gradually becomes electrically conductive like metal, allowing it to be heated with a glass electric arc furnace. Unlike the graphite electrodes used in electric arc furnaces for steel, which are in the center of the furnace, electric glass furnaces use electrodes made of molybdenum, which are placed near the edges of the furnace. Fully electric glass furnaces often use cold-top vertical melting (CTVM).

Using pure oxygen instead of air to burn fossil fuels (preferably gas) saves energy and, in the best case, reduces operating costs. The combustion temperature, and therefore the heat transfer, is higher and the volume of gas to be heated is lower. However, oxygen-fired glass furnaces are usually not viable for the production of bulk glass, such as hollow and flat glass, due to the high cost of oxygen production. There are many different types of glass melting furnaces. The types of furnaces used in glass manufacturing include the so-called "end-fired", "side-fired" and "oxy-fuel" furnaces. The latest development is the hybrid furnace. A number of projects are currently under construction for this type and some are operational already in 2023. Typically, the size of a furnace is classified by its production capacity in metric tonnes per day (MTPD).

In order to save energy in the glass melting process, in addition to using as much recycled glass as possible (approx. 2% energy savings for every 10% cullet), the heating of the combustion air to a temperature level as high as possible by means of using a regenerative or a recuperator system is a fundamental part of the process.

The glass exits the furnace via a waist or a throat. The throat can be straight or sunken and raise outside the furnace. These structures are narrow and thus speed up the flow of glass as it exits the furnace. The sunken throat prevents glass from flowing back into the furnace, improving thermal efficiency. The throat or waist experience high levels of corrosion and define the lifetime of the furnace. The difference between the waist and throat designs is glass melting capacity, as the waist design is only used in float glass plants. After the throat, the glass can pass through a riser, not unlike a drain trap, sometimes moved by heat applied using electrodes. The riser prevents glass from exiting unless new material is added to the furnace. Electric boosting refers to providing additional heat using electricity to a fossil-fuel powered furnace. It is possible for a furnace to have a separate refining section where air bubbles and impurities rise to the surface of the molten glass, which are then removed, or this can be at the bottom of the furnace just above the throat.

== Regenerator ==
In the most commonly used regenerator, the hot exhaust gases (1300 °C - 1400 °C) are fed discontinuously in chambers through a latticework of refractory, rectangular or special shaped bricks. This so-called lattice work is heated in the process. After this warm-up period (storage of the thermal energy of the exhaust gas by the lattice), the direction of the gas flow is reversed and the fresh, cold air required for combustion now flows through the previously heated lattice work of the chamber. The combustion air is thereby preheated to approx. 1200 °C - 1300 °C. This results in considerable energy savings. After combustion, the exhaust gases in turn enter the grating of another chamber, where they reheat the now more previously cooled grating. The process is repeated periodically at intervals of 20 to 30 minutes. The chambers are thus operated discontinuously. The degree of recovery is approx. 65%

== Recuperator ==
A recuperator operates continuously and consist of a metallic heat exchanger between the exhaust gas and fresh air. Because of the metallic exchanger surface (heat-resistant high-alloy steel tubes in combination with a metallic double shell), a recuperator can only be operated at lower exhaust gas temperatures and therefore work less effectively (40%). Thus, only relatively lower preheating temperatures ( max. 800 °C) are achieved here.

A recuperator is less expensive to install and require less space and investment. This results in cost advantages in terms of investment costs, which are, however, considerably reduced by the lower effectiveness or can even have a negative impact for a long period of operation.

In the case of structural restrictions for the installation of a regenerator, a combinations of regenerator and recuperator have also been developed and implemented in order to achieve the most energy-saving or efficient operation of the system possible.

As a further measure, in order to utilize the heat content of the exhaust gas (temperature > 700 °C), a downstream heat/power coupling is technically possible or has already been tested on a large scale. However, the necessary maintenance effort of such a system is associated with considerable costs and is therefore to be evaluated as critical with regard to the associated operating costs. Therefore, this particular concept of downstream energy recovery is generally not pursued further at present. Innovative revisions of this concept must be tested in practice in the productive environment in the long term at great expense. However, this requires a certain willingness to take risks on the part of the companies, which, due to the fierce competition in this industry, is generally not taken.

== Future development ==
Triggered by the climate debate, several developments and research projects have now been launched to significantly reduce the climate-damaging CO_{2} in production. Among other things, an initiative has been launched in Europe to establish a new type of glass melting furnace. Various European glass manufacturers are working on this project together with technology suppliers with the aim of realizing a corresponding plant on an industrial scale. It is intended to put the plant into operation in 2022 with a melting capacity of 350 tons per day. This glass melting so called Hybrid-Furnace will be operated with 80% electricity generated from renewable energy sources and is expected to enable a reduction of CO_{2} by 50%.

The industry, a community of interest of 19 European container glass companies, tried to be supported financially by the EU Innovation Fund. However this was not successful in being awarded a grant by the EU Innovation Fund, despite the project achieving very high evaluation scores in terms of innovation, sectoral approach and scalability.

Although the involved companies volunteered to contribute financially to the project, the EU grant was still representing a significant contribution to the additional CAPEX and OPEX compared to a conventional furnace. Without the EU grant, the project could not be pursued as initially planned. However, the industry is now evaluating how to proceed with their decarbonisation efforts. End of year 2024 a project furnace was realized and went to commissioning.

Furthermore, there are research projects to heat glass melting furnaces alternatively with so-called green hydrogen. The combustion of hydrogen only produces water vapor. However, the water vapor has an influence on the melting process and the glass composition as well as the properties of the glass produced. The way in which this influence can be controlled and corrected is the subject of further investigation. A large-scale industrial trial was successfully conducted in August 2021.

Hydrogen, however, has a considerably lower calorific value per cubic meter compared to natural gas. This is only about one-third of that of natural gas. This results in new requirements for gas pipelines to transport hydrogen. The currently existing natural gas network is not easily designed for this. To provide the same amount of energy, the pipelines must either be approx. 70% larger or designed for a higher pressure, or a flow rate three times higher must be realized at the same pressure. The latter measure could be applied in existing pipeline networks. However, this can lead to increased vibrations, mainly caused by the existing installations in the pipeline, which promote the formation of cracks and thus trigger major damage events in the long term. It is known that under certain conditions, 100% hydrogen will embrittle the material at this point, accelerating deeper crack formation. However, an initially partial admixture of hydrogen to the natural gas is possible and has already been implemented. At present, a broad scientific discussion is being held on this, as well as by pipe suppliers.

The alternative use of biofuel was also tested in a large-scale industrial trial. A CO_{2} reduction of 80% was achieved. However, the required gas quantities were not fully available for a longer period of time, so that the large-scale test was limited to 4 days.
