= Thermal wheel =

Type of energy recovery heat exchanger

Diagramatic operation of a thermal wheel

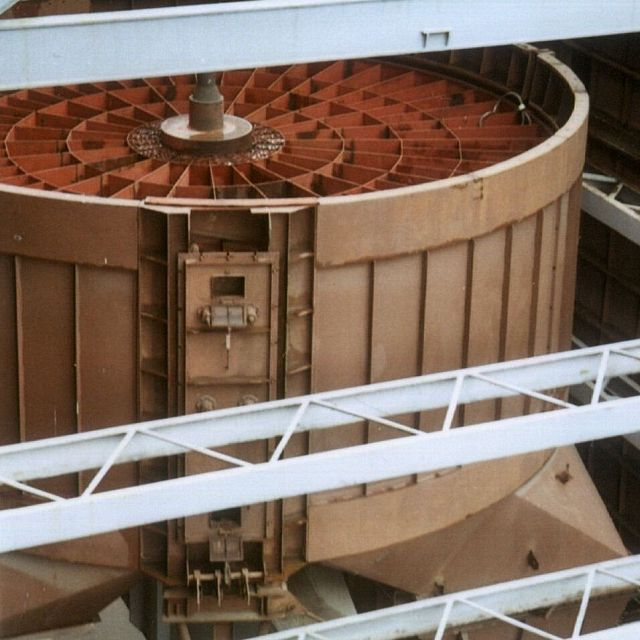
Ljungström air preheater by Swedish engineer Fredrik Ljungström (1875–1964)

A thermal wheel, also known as a rotary heat exchanger, or rotary air-to-air enthalpy wheel, energy recovery wheel, or heat recovery wheel, is a type of energy recovery heat exchanger positioned within the supply and exhaust air streams of air-handling units or rooftop units or in the exhaust gases of an industrial process, in order to recover the heat energy. Other variants include enthalpy wheels and desiccant wheels. A cooling-specific thermal wheel is sometimes referred to as a Kyoto wheel.

Rotary thermal wheels are a mechanical means of heat recovery. A rotating porous metallic wheel transfers thermal energy from one air stream to another by passing through each fluid alternately. The system operates by working as a thermal storage mass whereby the heat from the air is temporarily stored within the wheel matrix until it is transferred to the cooler air stream.

Two types of rotary thermal wheels exist: heat wheels and enthalpy (desiccant) wheels. Though there is a geometrical similarity between heat and enthalpy wheels, there are differences that affect the operation of each design. In a system using a desiccant wheel, the moisture in the air stream with the highest relative humidity is transferred to the opposite air stream after flowing through the wheel. This can work in both directions of incoming air to exhaust air and exhaust air to incoming air. The supply air can then be used directly or employed to further cool the air. This is an energy-intensive process.

The rotary air-to-air enthalpy wheel heat exchanger is a rotating cylinder filled with an air permeable material, typically polymer, aluminum, or synthetic fiber, providing the large surface area required for the sensible enthalpy transfer (enthalpy is a measure of heat). As the wheel rotates between the supply and exhaust air streams it picks up heat energy and releases it into the colder air stream. The driving force behind the exchange is the difference in temperatures between the opposing air streams (the thermal gradient).

The enthalpy exchange is accomplished through the use of desiccants. Desiccants transfer moisture through the process of adsorption which is predominately driven by the difference in the partial pressure of vapor within the opposing air-streams. Typical desiccants consist of silica gel, and molecular sieves.

Enthalpy wheels are the most effective devices to transfer both latent and sensible heat energy. Choice of construction materials for the rotor, most commonly polymer, aluminum, or fiberglass, determines durability.

When using rotary energy recovery devices the two air streams must be adjacent to one another to allow for the local transfer of energy. Also, there should be special considerations paid in colder climates to avoid wheel frosting. Systems can avoid frosting by modulating wheel speed, preheating the air, or stop/jogging the system.

O’Connor et al. studied the effect that a rotary thermal wheel has on the supply air flow rates into a building. A computational model was created to simulate the effects of a rotary thermal wheel on air flow rates when incorporated into a commercial wind tower system. The simulation was validated with a scale model experiment in a closed-loop subsonic wind tunnel. The data obtained from both tests were compared in order to analyze the flow rates. Although the flow rates were reduced compared to a wind tower which did not include a rotary thermal wheel, the guideline ventilation rates for occupants in a school or office building were met above an external wind speed of 3 m/s, which is lower than the average wind speed of the UK (4–5 m/s).

No full-scale experimental or field test data was completed in this study, therefore it cannot be conclusively proved that rotary thermal wheels are feasible for integration into a commercial wind tower system. However, despite the air flow rate decrease within the building after the introduction of the rotary thermal wheel, the reduction was not large enough to prevent the ventilation guideline rates from being met. Sufficient research has not yet been conducted to determine the suitability of rotary thermal wheels in natural ventilation, ventilation supply rates can be met but the thermal capabilities of the rotary thermal wheel have not yet been investigated. Further work would beneficial to increase understanding of the system.

== Description ==
A thermal wheel consists of a circular honeycomb matrix of heat-absorbing material, which is slowly rotated within the supply and exhaust air streams of an air-handling system. As the thermal wheel rotates, heat is captured from the exhaust air stream in one half of the rotation and released to the fresh air stream in the other half of the rotation. Thus waste heat energy from the exhaust air stream is transferred to the matrix material and then from the matrix material to the fresh air stream. This increases the temperature of the supply air stream by an amount proportional to the temperature differential between air streams, or "thermal gradient" and depending upon the efficiency of the device. Heat exchange is most efficient when the streams flow in opposite directions, since this causes a favourable temperature gradient across the thickness of the wheel. The principle works in reverse, and "cooling" energy can be recovered to the supply air stream if desired and the temperature differential allows.

The heat exchange matrix may be aluminium, plastic, or synthetic fiber. The heat exchanger is rotated by a small electric motor and belt drive system. The motors are often inverter speed-controlled for improved control of the exiting air temperature. If no heat exchange is required, the motor can be stopped altogether.

Because heat is transferred from the exhaust air stream to the supply air stream without passing directly through an exchange medium, the gross efficiencies are usually higher than any other air-side heat recovery system. The shallower depth of the heat exchange matrix, as compared to a plate heat exchanger, means that the pressure drop through the device is normally lower in comparison. Generally, a thermal wheel will be selected for face velocities between 1.5 and 3.0 metres per second (4.9 and 9.8 ft/s), and with equal air volume flow rates, gross "sensible" efficiencies of 85% can be expected. Although there is a small energy requirement to rotate the wheel, the motor energy consumption is usually low and has little effect upon the seasonal efficiency of the device. The ability to recover "latent" heat can improve gross efficiencies by 10–15%.

== Energy transfer process ==
Normally the heat transfer between airstreams provided by the device is termed as "sensible", which is the exchange of energy, or enthalpy, resulting in a change in temperature of the medium (air in this case), but with no change in moisture content. However, if moisture or relative humidity levels in the return air stream are high enough to allow condensation to take place in the device, then this will cause "latent" heat to be released, and the heat transfer material will be covered with a film of water. Despite a corresponding absorption of latent heat, as some of the water film is evaporated in the opposite air stream, the water will reduce the thermal resistance of the boundary layer of the heat exchanger material and thus improve the heat transfer coefficient of the device, and hence increase efficiency. The energy exchange of such devices now comprises both sensible and latent heat transfer; in addition to a change in temperature, there is also a change in moisture content of the air streams.

However, the film of condensation will also slightly increase pressure drop through the device, and depending upon the spacing of the matrix material, this can increase resistance by up to 30%. This will increase fan energy consumption and reduce the seasonal efficiency of the device.

Aluminium matrices are also available with an applied hygroscopic coating, and the use of this, or the use of porous synthetic fiber matrices, allows for the adsorption and release of water vapour, at moisture levels much lower than that normally required for condensation and latent heat transfer to occur. The benefit of this is an even higher heat transfer efficiency, but it also results in the drying or humidification of air streams, which may also be desired for the particular process being served by the supply air.

For this reason these devices are also commonly known as an enthalpy wheel.

=== Use in gas turbines ===
During the automotive industry's interest in gas turbines for vehicle propulsion (around 1965), Chrysler invented a unique type of rotary heat exchanger that consisted of a rotary drum constructed from corrugated metal (similar in appearance to corrugated cardboard). This drum was continuously rotated by reduction gears driven by the turbine. The hot exhaust gasses were directed through a portion of the device, which would then rotate to a section that conducted the induction air, where this intake air was heated. This recovery of the heat of combustion significantly increased the efficiency of the turbine engine. This engine proved impractical for an automotive application due to its poor low-speed torque. Even such an efficient engine, if large enough to deliver the proper performance, would have a low average fuel efficiency. Such an engine may at some future time be attractive when combined with an electric motor in a hybrid vehicle owing to its robust longevity and an ability to burn a wide variety of liquid fuels.

== Desiccant wheel ==
A desiccant wheel is very similar to a thermal wheel, but with a coating applied for the sole purpose of dehumidifying, or "drying", the air stream. The desiccant is normally silica gel. As the wheel turns, the desiccant passes alternately through the incoming air, where the moisture is adsorbed, and through a "regenerating" zone, where the desiccant is dried and the moisture expelled. The wheel continues to rotate, and the adsorbent process is repeated. Regeneration is normally carried out by the use of a heating coil, such as a water or steam coil, or a direct-fired gas burner.

Thermal wheels and desiccant wheels are often used in series configuration to provide the required dehumidification as well as recovering the heat from the regeneration cycle.

== Disadvantages ==
Thermal wheels are not suitable for use where total separation of supply and exhaust air streams is required, since air will bypass at the interface between the air streams at the heat exchanger boundary, and at the point where the wheel passes from one air stream to the other during its normal rotation. The former is reduced by brush seals, and the latter is reduced by a small purge section, formed by plating off a small segment of the wheel, normally in the exhaust air stream.

Matrices made from fibrous materials, or with hygroscopic coatings, for the transfer of latent heat, are far more susceptible to damage and degradation by "fouling" than plain metal or plastic materials, and are difficult or impossible to effectively clean if dirty. Care must be taken to properly filter the air streams on both exhaust and fresh air sides of the wheel. Any dirt attaching on either air side will invariably be transported into the air stream of the other side.

== Other types of air-to-air heat exchangers ==
- Run-around coil
- Recuperator, or cross plate heat exchanger
- Heat pipe

== See also ==
- HVAC
- Heat recovery ventilation
- Regenerative heat exchanger
- Rotating-plate regenerative air preheater
- Air handler
- Thermal comfort
- Indoor air quality
