= SHARC International Systems Inc. =

Canadian renewable energy company

- Company type: Public
- Industry: Energy HVAC
- Founded: 2010; 16 years ago
- Founder: Lynn Lyle Mueller
- Headquarters: Vancouver, British Columbia, Canada
- Products: SHARC, PIRANHA
- Website: www.sharcenergy.com

SHARC International Systems Inc. (CSE: SHRC), DBA SHARC Energy Systems, is a Canadian company, based in Vancouver, British Columbia, that specializes in wastewater heat recovery. Founded in 2010 by Lynn Mueller, the company operates throughout North America. A subsidiary, SHARC Energy Systems, based in Bracknell, UK, operates throughout Europe.

The company is one of the pioneers in wastewater heat recovery, offering an alternative energy source that reduces the need to burn fossil fuels. Their systems can be used for domestic hot water production as well as building space heating & cooling.

SHARC Energy's main products are the SHARC and PIRANHA, which remove solids from wastewater, allowing the wastewater to effectively move through a heat exchanger and heat pump. The systems provide hot water heating, space heating, air conditioning, and wastewater cooling.

SHARC wastewater heat recovery system

== See also ==
- Waste heat
- Energy recovery
- HVAC
- Wastewater
