= Recuperator =

Special purpose heat exchanger

Types of recuperator, or cross plate heat exchanger

A recuperator is a counter-flow energy recovery heat exchanger that recovers waste heat in the supply and exhaust air streams of an air-handling system or in the exhaust gases of an industrial process. Generally, they extract heat from the exhaust and use it to preheat air entering the combustion system, reducing the need for fuel and boosting the system's energy efficiency.

== Description ==
In many types of processes, combustion is used to generate heat, and the recuperator serves to recuperate, or reclaim this heat, in order to reuse or recycle it. The term recuperator refers as well to liquid-liquid counterflow heat exchangers used for heat recovery in the chemical and refinery industries and in closed processes such as ammonia-water or LiBr-water absorption refrigeration cycle.

Recuperators are often used in association with the burner portion of a heat engine, to increase the overall efficiency. For example, in a gas turbine engine, air is compressed, mixed with fuel, which is then burned and used to drive a turbine. The recuperator transfers some of the waste heat in the exhaust to the compressed air, thus preheating it before entering the fuel burner stage. Since the gases have been pre-heated, less fuel is needed to heat the gases up to the turbine inlet temperature. By recovering some of the energy usually lost as waste heat, the recuperator can make a heat engine or gas turbine significantly more efficient.

== Energy transfer process ==
Normally the heat transfer between airstreams provided by the device is termed as "sensible heat", which is the exchange of energy, or enthalpy, resulting in a change in temperature of the medium (air in this case), but with no change in moisture content. However, if moisture or relative humidity levels in the return air stream are high enough to allow condensation to take place in the device, then this will cause "latent heat" to be released and the heat transfer material will be covered with a film of water. Despite a corresponding absorption of latent heat, as some of the water film is evaporated in the opposite airstream, the water will reduce the thermal resistance of the boundary layer of the heat exchanger material and thus improve the heat transfer coefficient of the device, and hence increase efficiency. The energy exchange of such devices now comprises both sensible and latent heat transfer; in addition to a change in temperature, there is also a change in moisture content of the exhaust air stream.

However, the film of condensation will also slightly increase pressure drop through the device, and depending upon the spacing of the matrix material, this can increase resistance by up to 30%. If the unit is not laid to falls, and the condensate not allowed to drain properly, this will increase fan energy consumption and reduce the seasonal efficiency of the device.

== Use in ventilation systems ==
In heating, ventilation and air-conditioning systems, HVAC, recuperators are commonly used to re-use waste heat from exhaust air normally expelled to atmosphere. Devices typically comprises a series of parallel plates of aluminium, plastic, stainless steel, or synthetic fiber, copper alternate pairs of which are enclosed on two sides to form twin sets of ducts at right angles to each other, and which contain the supply and extract air streams. In this manner heat from the exhaust air stream is transferred through the separating plates, and into the supply air stream. Manufacturers claim gross efficiencies of up to 95% depending upon the specification of the unit.

The characteristics of this device are attributable to the relationship between the physical size of the unit, in particular the air path distance, and the spacing of the plates. For an equal air pressure drop through the device, a small unit will have a narrower plate spacing and a lower air velocity than a larger unit, but both units may be just as efficient. Because of the cross-flow design of the unit, its physical size will dictate the air path length, and as this increases, heat transfer will increase but pressure drop will also increase, and so plate spacing is increased to reduce pressure drop, but this in turn will reduce heat transfer.

As a general rule a recuperator selected for a pressure drop of between 150–250 pascals (0.022–0.036 psi) will have a good efficiency, while having a small effect on fan power consumption, but will have in turn a higher seasonal efficiency than that for physically smaller, but higher pressure drop recuperator.

When heat recovery is not required, it is typical for the device to be bypassed by use of dampers arranged within the ventilation distribution system. Assuming the fans are fitted with inverter speed controls, set to maintain a constant pressure in the ventilation system, then the reduced pressure drop leads to a slowing of the fan motor and thus reducing power consumption, and in turn improves the seasonal efficiency of the system.

== Use in metallurgical furnaces ==
Recuperators have also been used to recover heat from waste gasses to preheat combustion air and fuel for many years by metallic recuperators to reduce energy costs and carbon footprint of operation. Compared to alternatives such as regenerative furnaces, initial costs are lesser, there are no valves to be switching back and forth, there are no induced-draft fans and it does not require a web of gas ducts spread up all over the furnace.

Historically the recovery ratios of recuperators compared to regenerative burners were low. However, recent improvements to technology have allowed recuperators to recover 70-80% of the waste heat and pre-heated air up to 850–900 °C (1,560–1,650 °F) is now possible.

== Gas turbines ==
Cutaway of a recuperated microturbine

Recuperators can be used to increase the efficiency of gas turbines for power generation, provided the exhaust gas is hotter than the compressor outlet temperature. The exhaust heat from the turbine is used to pre-heat the air from the compressor before further heating in the combustor, reducing the fuel input required. The larger the temperature difference between turbine out and compressor out, the greater the benefit from the recuperator. Therefore, microturbines (<1 MW), which typically have low pressure ratios, have the most to gain from the use of a recuperator. In practice, a doubling of efficiency is possible through the use of a recuperator. The major practical challenge for a recuperator in microturbine applications is coping with the exhaust gas temperature, which can exceed 750 °C (1,380 °F).

== Other types of gas-to-gas heat exchangers ==
- Heat pipe
- Run-around coil
- Thermal wheel, or rotary heat exchanger (including enthalpy wheel and desiccant wheel)
- Convection recuperator
- Radiation recuperator

== See also ==
- Air handler
- Energy recovery ventilation
- Heat recovery ventilation
- HVAC (heating, ventilation, and air conditioning)
- Indoor air quality
- Regenerative heat exchanger
- Thermal comfort
