= Sensible heat =

Heat exchanged by a body or thermodynamic system

Sensible heat is heat exchanged by a body or thermodynamic system in which the exchange of heat changes the temperature of the body or system, and some macroscopic variables of the body or system, but leaves unchanged certain other macroscopic variables of the body or system, such as volume or pressure.

== Usage ==
Sensible heat is in contrast to latent heat, which is the amount of heat exchanged that is hidden, meaning it occurs without change of temperature. For example, during a phase change such as the melting of ice, the temperature of the system containing the ice and the liquid is constant until all ice has melted. Latent heat and sensible heat are complementary terms.

The sensible heat of a thermodynamic process may be calculated as the product of the body's mass (m) with its specific heat capacity (c) and the change in temperature ($\Delta T$):

$$Q_\text{sensible} = m c \Delta T \, .$$

Joule described sensible heat as the energy measured by a thermometer

Sensible heat and latent heat are not special forms of energy. Rather, they are exchanges of heat under conditions specified in terms of their effect on a material or a thermodynamic system.

In the writings of the early scientists who provided the foundations of thermodynamics, sensible heat had a clear meaning in calorimetry. James Prescott Joule characterized it in 1847 as an energy that was indicated by the thermometer.

Both sensible and latent heats are observed in many processes while transporting energy in nature. Latent heat is associated with changes of state, measured at constant temperature, especially the phase changes of atmospheric water, mostly vaporization and condensation, whereas sensible heat directly affects the temperature of the atmosphere.

In meteorology, sensible heat flux is the conductive heat flux from the Earth's surface to the atmosphere. It is an important component of Earth's surface energy budget. Sensible heat flux is commonly measured with the eddy covariance method.

== See also ==
- Eddy covariance flux (eddy correlation, eddy flux)
- Enthalpy
- Thermodynamic databases for pure substances
