= Cape figwort =

Cape figwort may refer to plants in the genus Phygelius:

- Phygelius
  - Phygelius aequalis
  - Phygelius capensis
