= Fuchsia (disambiguation) =

Fuchsia is a genus of plants.

Fuchsia may also refer to:

== Science and technology ==
- Fuchsia (color), a reddish-purple color
- Fuchsia (operating system), an operating system by Google

=== Organisms ===
- Brazilian fuchsia, Justicia floribunda
- California fuchsia, Epilobium canum (formerly Zauschneria californica)
- Cape fuchsia, plant species in the genus Phygelius
- Fuchsia bush, plants species in the genus Eremophila
- Fuchsia (moth), a concealer moth genus of subfamily Amphisbatinae

== Arts and entertainment ==
- Fuchsia Groan, a fictional character in the Gormenghast novels by Mervyn Peake
- Fuchsia (band), a 1970s musical group
- Fuchsia (film), a 2009 Philippine film
- Fuchsia, one of The Devil Girls, characters in the Sinfest comic strip
- Fuchsia City, a settlement in the Kanto region of the Pokémon universe

== Other uses ==
- Fuchsia (clothing) a former fashion company
- USS Fuchsia (1863), a ship of the Union Navy in the American Civil War
