= Californians Against Waste =

American non-profit organization

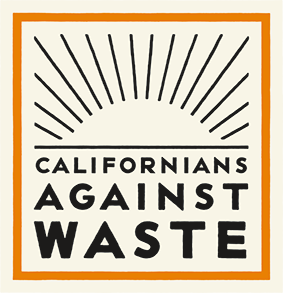
- Founded: 1977
- Type: Environmental advocacy organization
- Headquarters: Sacramento, California
- Location: Sacramento, California, U.S.
- Fields: Environmental Policy, Recycling, Composting, Extended Producer Responsibility,
- Executive Director: Mark Murray
- Key people: Nick Lapis, Director of Advocacy
- Website: www.cawrecycles.org

Californians Against Waste (CAW) is a nonprofit environmental advocacy organization based in Sacramento, California. Founded in 1977, CAW advocates for policies to reduce pollution, conserve natural resources, and build a circular economy through waste prevention, recycling, and extended producer responsibility. The organization has played a central role in shaping California’s waste and recycling legislation and influencing broader national policy. It is headquartered two blocks from the California State Capitol in Sacramento.

According to the organization's website, "Californians Against Waste is a non-profit environmental research and advocacy organization that identifies, develops, promotes and monitors policy solutions to pollution and conservation problems posing a threat to public health and the environment. Californians Against Waste's history has demonstrated it to be the nation's oldest, largest and most effective non-profit environmental organization advocating for the implementation of waste reduction and recycling policies and programs."

== Mission ==
The stated mission of Californians Against Waste is "to protect communities by eliminating the pollution inherent in the extraction and disposal of natural resources. CAW believes in preventing waste at its source and holding producers responsible throughout a product's lifecycle to transition California to a thriving circular economy."

== History ==
=== Founding and Early Years (1977–1984) ===
CAW was founded in 1977 by environmentalist Amy Hewes during a period of growing awareness about solid waste and recycling in the United States. The organization’s early campaigns supported local bottle bills and advocated for container deposit legislation in California.

Matt Kuzins became Executive Director in the early 1980s and helped shape CAW’s legislative focus. "We were trying to show that recycling wasn’t just a fringe idea—it could be a real, effective alternative to landfills," he said in a 1982 interview with the Christian Science Monitor.

=== Legislative Influence and Expansion (1985–1995) ===
Under Executive Director Bill Shireman, CAW helped usher in a new era of comprehensive waste policy. A key achievement was the passage of AB 939, the California Integrated Waste Management Act of 1989, which required local governments to cut waste disposal by 50% by 2000.

In 1988, when Governor George Deukmejian vetoed AB 3298 (the predecessor legislation to AB 939), CAW, led by Executive Director Sandra Jerabek, staged a protest by dumping trash on the steps of the California State Capitol. Dan Weintraub later described the act as "part protest, part performance art—effective enough to draw cameras, and eventually, compromise."

=== Leadership of Mark Murray and Ongoing Legislative Advocacy (1995–present) ===
Mark Murray became Executive Director in the mid-1990s. Journalist Dan Weintraub characterized CAW under Murray’s leadership as a "shadow legislature," writing: "No other outside organization writes more bills, testifies more often, or influences more environmental votes in Sacramento."

Nick Lapis, CAW's Director of Advocacy joined the organization in 2007. In that time, he has led campaigns focused on reducing climate change, recovering biodegradable waste, reduce plastic pollution, greenwashing, implementing extended producer responsibility, recycling market development, and fighting pollution from landfills and incinerators.

=== The California Redemption Value ===
In 1977, a group of California environmentalists founded Californians Against Waste to organize support for beverage container recycling policies that would eventually lead to the creation of the California Redemption Value, also known by the CRV acronym found on bottles and cans. Oregon passed the nation's first bottle bill in 1970. In 1986, CAW worked with Assemblymember Burt Margolin to sponsor and see signed into law AB 2020, which created the CRV.

=== E-waste in California ===
After personal computers and cell phones started to become widely used in California in the 1990s, a growing amount of resulting e-waste began accumulating in landfills. These electronics often contain hazardous materials, and the handling and disposal of these products created new, toxic threats to the environment and public health.

In the 2000s, Californians Against Waste sponsored legislation that created retailer take-back programs for personal computers, mobile phones, rechargeable batteries and other household electronics. Today, hundreds of electronics retailers throughout the state participate in the program and accept these items for recycling, free of charge. The legislation also established limits on the amount of hazardous materials that electronics may contain, as well as efficiency standards for light bulbs that led to the phasing out of incandescent light bulbs in the state.

=== Expanding product stewardship ===
Take-back programs are based on the concept of product stewardship, and Californians Against Waste went on the apply this concept to major sources of waste besides e-waste. Since 2010, the organization has sponsored legislation that created the PaintCare and Bye Bye Mattress product stewardship programs for the collection and recycling of used paint and mattresses.

=== Banning lightweight plastic grocery bags ===
In 2014, Californians Against Waste worked with California State Senator Alex Padilla to sponsor SB 270, legislation that would phase-out lightweight plastic bags. Environmentalists cite lightweight plastic grocery bags as a significant source of non-biodegradable environmental pollution because their lightweight nature allows them to be blown long distances by wind and eventually end up in rivers, lakes and oceans. California uses over 13 billion lightweight plastic grocery bags every year.

SB 270 was signed by the governor and would have gone into effect in July 2015. However, the American Progressive Bag Alliance spent $3.2 million to collect enough signatures to qualify a referendum on SB 270. The referendum went before California voters during the November 2016 presidential election, requiring a 'Yes' vote to uphold the plastic bag ban and reject the referendum. The proposition was approved with 53.27% of the vote.

CAW subsequently sponsored legislation by Senator Susan Eggman in 2022 to expand this legislation to cover plastic produce bags that are not compostable or made of paper. In 2024, CAW and other environmental organizations worked with Senator Catherine Blakespear to close a loophole that they claimed allowed stores to continue to use thicker plastic bags.

=== Acting locally ===
To generate support and momentum needed to pass statewide legislation, Californians Against Waste sometimes works with community groups and local governments to pass local ordinances. Before the passage of SB 270, Californians Against Waste worked with many of the over 100 cities and counties in the state that had already enacted local plastic bag bans. This work came after the organization worked at the local level to pass local beverage container deposit ordinances.

=== Toward zero waste ===
To move California closer to the goal of zero waste, Californians Against Waste worked with Assemblymember Wes Chesbro in 2011 to sponsor AB 341 to establish a state policy for the State of California to achieve a 75 percent recycling rate by 2020. This law also required businesses and apartment complexes with five or more units to provide residents with on-site recycling opportunities.

In addition, the organization sponsored a new law that, beginning in 2016, phases in the requirement for restaurants, grocery stores and certain other businesses to provide for the composting or anaerobic digestion of their food waste and green waste. This was subsequently expanded by the landmark SB 1383 (by State Senator Ricardo Lara) in 2016 to mandate universal composting service for all businesses and residents, and ban the disposal of edible food that can be donated, both of which went into effect in 2022.

== Notable Staff and Alumni ==
Amy Hewes: Founding Executive Director

Matt Kuzins: Early 1980s Executive Director

Bill Shireman: Director during AB 939

Sandra Jerabek: Late 1980s Executive Director

Mark Murray: Executive Director since 1995; described as a "one-man lobbying army"

Rick Best: Former Policy Director, remembered for pioneering recycling policy prior to his passing. The California Resource Recovery Association’s Rick Best Award is named in his honor.

Scott Smithline: Director of Legal and Regulatory affairs director; later Director of CalRecycle under Governor Jerry Brown

Nick Lapis: Director of Advocacy since 2007

== Californians Against Waste Foundation ==
The Californians Against Waste Foundation is CAW’s affiliated 501(c)(3) nonprofit. It focuses on public education, technical assistance, and research on zero waste strategies.

== Visual Identity ==
In 2022, CAW introduced a new logo designed by graphic artist Michael Schwab, known for his work with the National Park Service and Amtrak.

Schwab stated, "I was proud and excited to create an image for CAW that visually portrays a healthy future, evoking a strong California and defining a bold, smart organization. They are environmental changemakers, fighting to create a brighter, regenerative and hopeful world for us all."
