= Lawren Pope =

American fashion designer (born 1987)

Lawren Cappelletti
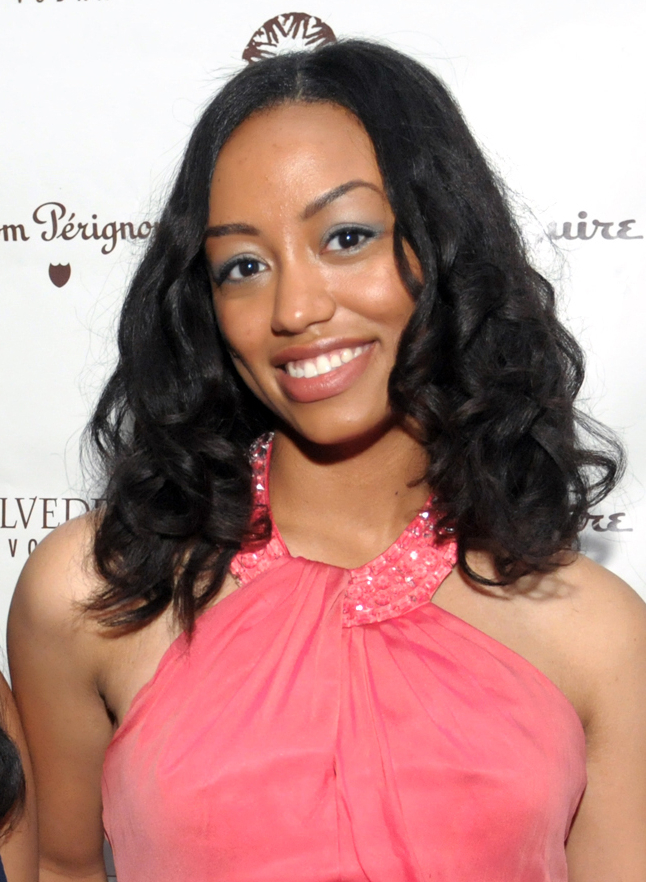
- Born: Lawren Michele Pope; June 8, 1987 (age 39); Houston, Texas, US
- Years active: 2001–present
- Website: Official website

Lawren Michele Cappelletti (born Lawren Michele Pope; June 8, 1987) is an American fashion designer. She is best known for the clothing line, Fuchsia, she began with Veronica Scott at age 14.

== Career ==
Most notably, Pope is recognized for the design house Fuchsia that business partner Veronica Scott and she began in 2001. Veronica and Lawren have mentioned in several interviews that they were polar opposites when they met the first day of freshman year at Westside High School. Scott describes her style as "Abercrombie & Fitch", while her counterpart was more "Hot Topic." Still, Lawren says that she is messy, while Veronica is highly organized, but their friendship was cemented by their mutual love of design. The Houston Chronicle has quoted Pope as saying, "Now we are inseparable; over the years we've meshed into something."

Lawren and Veronica have since gained more notoriety since moving to California, and frequently attend events in both San Diego and Los Angeles. Neither girls has attended fashion school or has any formal training; and they credit their grandmothers for having taught them how to sew.

Shortly after leaving Houston, Scott and Pope began Save the Girls, an organization dedicated to providing scholarships for girls interested in pursuing a degree in business. Save the Girls is funded through the collection of California Redemption Value recyclable items. The not-for-profit also has a curbside recycling service, offers free vocational training, and is an active participant in the conservation movement.

Lawren currently has her own clothing line, Lawren Michele, which has been shown in several fashion events, including a preview at the Hard Rock Hotel and Casino, Fashion Week New Orleans, Los Angeles Fashion Weekend at Sunset Gower Studios, and a presentation at Rogue Space Chelsea for New York Fashion Week.

== Personal life ==
Pope was born and raised in Houston, Texas, where she attended both Westside and Lee High Schools. Following graduation in 2005, Lawren completed her freshman year of college at Houston Baptist University before relocating with Fuchsia's company headquarters in San Diego, California. There, Pope continues to expand the company and pursue an international business degree.
