= Michael Vanderbyl =

American graphic designer

- Born: Michael James Vanderbyl; February 9, 1947 (age 79); Oakland, California, United States
- Occupations: Designer, professor
- Movement: Pacific Wave design movement
- Website: http://www.vanderbyl.com/

Michael James Vanderbyl (born February 9, 1947) is a multidisciplinary designer and design educator based in the San Francisco Bay Area, and the principal of Vanderbyl Design.

== Biography ==
Michael Vanderbyl was born February 9, 1947, in Oakland, California. Vanderbyl received a Bachelor of Fine Arts degree in Graphic Design in 1968 from California College of the Arts (CCA).

Vanderbyl would be hired by San Francisco designer G. Dean Smith (designer of the Circle 7 logo) after graduating in 1968, with whom he would work until 1970 when he joined local firm Soyster & Ohrenschall. Due to the firm's size and approach toward market research, he would leave S&O in 1973 to establish his own practice, Vanderbyl Design. He has designed products for, among others, McGuire Furniture, and HBF. Vanderbyl and Smith would reunite in 1975 to design the "circle 2" logo for television station KTVU.

He taught graphic design at CCA for more than 30 years, from 1973 to 2014, and served as the dean of design from 1986 to 2002.

Vanderbyl was one of the artists in the early 1980s that helped establish the San Francisco Bay Area as a center of the postmodern movement in graphic design. In the early 1980s a few San Francisco–based designers were nicknamed “The Michaels” because they all had the same name (Vanderbyl alongside, Cronan, Mabry, Manwaring, Schwab), and later they were known as the "Pacific Wave" according to historian Steven Heller and as described by author and curator Giorgio Camuffo in Pacific Wave: California Graphic Design.

Vanderbyl was awarded the 2000 AIGA Medal by the American Institute of Graphic Arts (AIGA). He has been a member of the Alliance Graphique Internationale (AGI) since 1987. He was the recipient of a Lifetime Achievement Award from the International Interior Design Association (IIDA) in 2006. In 2012, he was inducted into the Interior Design Hall of Fame.

== See also ==
- List of AIGA medalists
