= CalRecycle =

Oversees waste management in California

California Department of Resources Recycling and Recovery
- CalRecycle logo

Agency overview
- Formed: 1989
- Preceding agencies: California State Solid Waste Management Board; California Integrated Waste Management Board (CIWMB)
- Headquarters: Cal/EPA Building, Sacramento, California
- Parent agency: California Environmental Protection Agency
- Website: www.calrecycle.ca.gov

The California Department of Resources Recycling and Recovery, branded as CalRecycle, is a branch of the California Environmental Protection Agency that oversees the state's waste management, recycling, and waste reduction programs. CalRecycle was established in 2010 to replace the California Integrated Waste Management Board. It is known for administering the California Redemption Value (CRV) program, among other responsibilities.

== History ==
=== State Solid Waste Management Board ===
The original waste management agency, the State Solid Waste Management Board, was established in 1972. It was renamed the California Waste Management Board in 1982.

=== California Integrated Waste Management Board ===
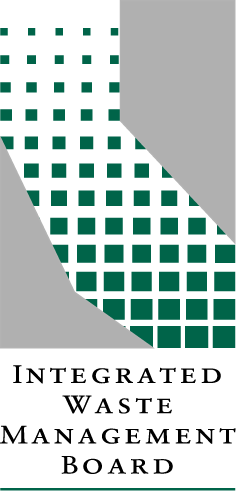
Logo of the California Integrated Waste Management Board

The California Integrated Waste Management Board (CIWMB) was established in 1989 under AB 939 introduced by Byron Sher of the California State Assembly and signed into law by Governor George Deukmejian.

The CIWMB was one of six agencies under the California Environmental Protection Agency (abbreviated Cal/EPA, to distinguish it from the federal United States Environmental Protection Agency—EPA). The CIWMB was led by a six-member policy-making Board. Four members of the Board were appointed by the governor, and each branch of the Legislature made one appointment. Board terms ran for up to four years.

In 2005, Governor Arnold Schwarzenegger proposed to eliminate the CIWMB as well as 87 other state boards and commissions. California state senator Tony Strickland introduced Senate Bill (SB) 63 in January 2009 to dissolve the CIWMB; Governor Arnold Schwarzenegger signed SB 63 into law in July 2009. The California Integrated Waste Management Board—CIWMB became defunct on January 1, 2010.

=== California Department of Resources Recycling and Recovery ===
The CIWMB's duties and responsibilities were transferred to the California Department of Resources Recycling and Recovery (CalRecycle), another agency within the California Environmental Protection Agency, in January 2010. The functions of the beverage container recycling deposit/California Redemption Value (CRV) programs established by the California Beverage Container Recycling and Litter Reduction Act (AB 2020, Margolin - 1986), or "Bottle Bill," were consolidated from California Department of Conservation, Division of Recycling into the new CalRecycle.

CalRecycle Monthly Public Meetings provide an overview of many pending and recently-made decisions, updates about ongoing department projects and work activities, and a general report from the Director of CalRecycle.

==== January 2010 – January 2011 ====
Margo Reid Brown, who was board chair under the previous CIMWB structure, was appointed by Governor Arnold Schwarzenegger as the first chief deputy director and acting director of CalRecycle.

==== January 2011 – February 2012 ====
CalRecycle deputy director Mark Leary (and Executive Director of the former CIWMB from 2001 to 2010) served as Acting Chief Deputy Director and Acting Director of CalRecycle.

==== February 2012 – May 2012 ====
Mark Leary was appointed by Governor Edmund G. Brown Jr. as Chief Deputy Director of CalRecycle and continued to serve as Acting Director of CalRecycle until Caroll Mortensen was appointed.

==== October 2011 – July 2015 ====
Caroll Mortensen was the first director of CalRecycle appointed by Governor Edmund G. Brown Jr. in October 2011, confirmed unanimously by the state senate in May 2012, and served until July 2015. Both Mark Leary (2011-2012) and Margo Reid Brown (2010-2011) were acting directors, but Mortensen was the first to be appointed Director of CalRecycle by the governor. Mortensen continues as a senior environmental scientist within the Legislative and External Affairs Office at CalRecycle.

==== July 2015 – December 2019 ====
Scott Smithline served as the director of CalRecycle from July 2015 to December 2019. Director Smithline was appointed by Governor Edmund G. Brown Jr. and confirmed unanimously by the state senate in July 2015. As director, Smithline led efforts on waste reduction and recycling as well as oversight of waste disposal in order to protect public health and the environment. Before becoming director, he served as the department's assistant director for policy development since 2011, and, previously as the Director of Legal and Regulatory Affairs at Californians Against Waste. Ken DeRosa is current chief deputy director of CalRecycle and was appointed by Governor Edmund G. Brown Jr. in November 2012.

December 2020 - Current

Rachel Wagoner was appointed as the Director of CalRecycle by Governor Newsom in December 2020.

== Programs and current issues ==
When the CIWMB was established, California diverted only 10 percent of solid waste out of landfills and into recycling and/or reuse projects. By 2007, the waste diversion rate had increased to 58 percent. The CIWMB's cooperative efforts with California's local jurisdictions (counties and municipalities) in furtherance of AB 939's mandate to reach 50 percent waste diversion contributed to the rise.

The CIWMB worked to implement programs to seek "a higher and better use" for an estimated 92 million tons of waste generated each year in California. Specifically, the CIWMB provided grants and loans that helped California's recycling industry; used incentive grants and loans to help spur the private sector into developing new markets for recycled materials; cleaned up solid waste disposal sites; and cleared illegal waste tire disposal sites. The CIWMB also regulated California landfills; promoted the proper disposal of used motor oil; promoted the reuse and recycling of electronic waste; coordinated the safe disposal of sharps waste; and encouraged the purchase of environmentally preferable devices.

In 2001, CIWMB became the first government agency to adopt "Zero Waste" as a strategic goal.

By 2017, the recycling rates for bottles and cans in California had fallen to their lowest point in almost a decade, and critics alleged CalRecycle was not sufficiently adjusting its subsidiary processing payments to changing market conditions.

=== Composting Goals and Regulations ===
According to CalRecycle, organic waste takes up about a third of California's landfills with food waste alone taking up about 15.5 percent. The decomposition of this organic waste in landfills contributes significantly to greenhouse gas emissions. Organic waste must be diverted from landfills and to Compostable Material Handling Facilities and Operations that are permitted to compost under CalRecycle regulation Title 14, Natural Resources—Division 7, Chapter 3.1 approved April 4, 2003. This regulation was adopted as a means of implementing the provisions of the California Waste Management Act of 1989 relating to composting. California operations that only compost agricultural material and sell or give away more than 2,500 cubic yards or more a year, and operations and facilities that use agricultural and clean green material and sell or give away 1,000 cubic yards or more a year are required to abide by the regulations of chapter 3.1 and obtain a Compostable Materials Handling Facility Permit under Article 2, Section 17854, unless they meet certain exclusions. Handling of compostable materials during use as growth mediums on mushroom farms and Vermicomposting farms are not subject to these regulations. The regulations prohibit the composting of unprocessed mammalian tissue unless used for researching pathogen reduction, treated or untreated medical waste, and hazardous waste, and require minimization of odor, impacts, litter, noise, dust, and pathogens, as well as emissions of the permitted facilities.

=== Statewide Commission on Recycling Markets and Curbside Recycling ===
The California Recycling Market Development Act (AB 1583 by Assembly Member Susan Eggman) established the Statewide Commission on Recycling Markets and Curbside Recycling to advise the Department on issues related to market development, recyclability, and achieving the department's existing waste diversion goals. The Director appointed 16 members to serve on the commission, and Chairwoman Heidi Sanborn stated that "the commission was created because there is a crisis in our industry, and our haulers, nonprofits and everyone in this space knows we are not achieving our goals. In fact, we are going backward, so we need to bring stakeholders together to publicly discuss problems." The commission issued 19 Preliminary Recommendations in December 2020.

Nick Lapis of Californians Against Waste, a Commissioner and co-sponsor of the California Recycling Market Development Act, stated that, "China’s National Sword exposed that we thought we were recycling a lot that was going overseas that was not actually being recycled. Now that we are forced to deal with it ourselves it puts an obligation on us to create markets. And it highlights that a lot of materials that were being shipped are not currently recyclable."

== See also ==
- Environmentalism
- Index of recycling articles
- 3,000 mile myth
