= Michael Patrick Cronan =

American designer, known for graphics and brand strategy

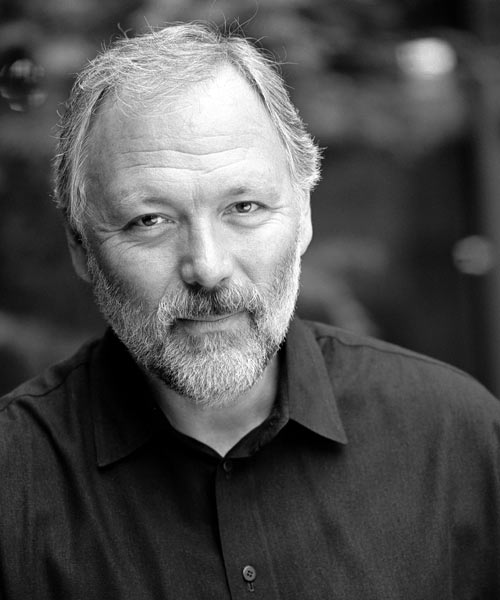
- Born: June 9, 1951; San Francisco, California, US
- Died: January 1, 2013 (aged 61); Berkeley, California, US
- Occupations: Graphic designer, brand designer, professor
- Movement: Pacific Wave design movement
- Spouse: Karin Hibma
- Children: 2

Michael Patrick Cronan (June 9, 1951 – January 1, 2013) was an American graphic designer, brand strategist, adjunct professor, and fine art painter. He was one of the founders of the San Francisco Bay Area postmodern movement in graphic design, that later became known as the "Pacific Wave".

He was a 2014 American Institute of Graphic Arts (AIGA) Medalist and received the AIGA lifetime achievement award in 2009.

== Early life and education ==
Cronan was born in San Francisco, California on June 9, 1951 and grew up near Sacramento. As a teenager, he learned letterpress printing and had become an artist in a local print shop, creating posters.

He studied fine art at California College of Arts and Crafts (now known as California College of the Arts) and later graduated from California State University, Sacramento (BA degree 1974). He met his future wife and business partner, Karin Hibma at California State University, Sacramento. Together they had two sons, sculptor and artist, Shawn HibmaCronan; and industrial designer, Nick Cronan.

In 1971, he went abroad to study archeology, and work as an archaeological dig manager for Hebrew University in the Negev Desert and then at the Dead Sea.

== Career ==
=== Pacific Wave movement ===
In the early 1980s a few San Francisco–based designers were nicknamed “The Michaels” because they all had the same name (Cronan, alongside Mabry, Manwaring, Vanderbyl, Schwab), and later they were known as the "Pacific Wave" according to historian Steven Heller.

=== Cronan Design ===
Cronan and Karin Hibma established Michael Patrick Cronan Design (also known as Cronan Design, but later known simply as Cronan) in 1980. Cronan Design clients including TiVo, Kindle, Good Belly, Apple, Levi Strauss & Co., Estee Lauder, among others. Cronan Design often worked on brand-strategy consulting, they would extensively interview clients and Cronan found naming inspiration by playing with Scrabble tiles for unique letter combinations.

In June 2009, he and Karin Hibma were named as two of Fast Company's list of 100 Most Creative People in Business.

=== Walking Man ===
Together Cronan and Hibma formed a sub-brand of clothing design, Walking Man, in 1989. In 1992 and 1993, Walking Man clothing won the I.D. Magazine Consumer Product of the Year/Gold Award presented at the Cooper Hewitt National Design Museum, New York.

=== Other design experiences ===
He was an adjunct professor of graphic design at California College of the Arts from 1981–2001.

Cronan designed the stamp commemorating the fiftieth anniversary of NATO and later the Prostate Awareness stamp for the United States Postal Service.

In 1998, SFMOMA commissioned Cronan to create the SFMOMA symbol which graphically captures the distinctive oculus at the center of the museum building designed by Mario Botta.

Alongside his design work, Cronan had worked as a fine art painter for most of his life.

His graphic design work is included in many public museum collections including at the Los Angeles County Museum of Art (LACMA), San Francisco Museum of Modern Art, the Library of Congress, among others.

== Membership ==
Cronan was a founding member of the American Institute of Graphic Art (AIGA) chapter in San Francisco and the AIGASF chapter president after serving on the AIGA national board for three years. Cronan was Chairman of the Board of the Pickle Family Circus, attended the Aspen Leadership Summit in 2005 and served on the Board of the Aspen Design Summit from 2005 – 2006.

== Exhibitions ==
- 1985 – Pacific Wave, curated by Giorgio Camuffo, at Museo Fortuny, Venice, Italy
- 1993 – In the Public Eye: The Work of Four Graphic Designers, San Francisco Museum of Modern Art (SFMOMA), San Francisco, California. This exhibition was including Michael Manwaring, Gerald Reis, and Michael Vanderbyl. It was the first graphic design exhibition at the San Francisco Museum of Modern Art and its popularity ushered in an expanded presence of graphics in the museum's floor space and permanent collection.
- 2002 – US Design: 1975-2000, curated by R. Craig Miller, Denver Art Museum, Denver, Colorado

== Publications ==
Cronan has been subject of profile articles in Communication Arts Magazine, I.D. Magazine, Linea Graphica (Italy), Graphis Inc., HOW, and many others.

- Detrick, Mia (1981). Sushi. Michael Patrick Cronan (art director, designer). San Francisco, California: Chronicle Books. ISBN 9780877012382. LCCN 81012224.
- "Michael Patrick Cronan-Studio 8". Step By Step Graphics, Magazine for Traditional and Electronic Graphics (magazine). Vol. 5, no. 5. Dynamic Graphics, Inc. August 1989.
- Wheeler, Alina (2003). Designing Brand Identity: A Complete Guide to Creating, Building, and Maintaining Strong Brands. Wiley. p. 116. ISBN 978-0471213260.
- Meggs, Philip Baxter; Purvis, Alston W. (2011). Meggs' History of Graphic Design. John Wiley & Sons. pp. 22–23. ISBN 9781118017760.

== Death ==
On January 1, 2013, Cronan died at his Berkeley home after a long time with colon cancer. He had been diagnosed for the same for five years previously.
