= Michael Mabry =

American graphic designer, illustrator, and educator

- Born: 1955 (age 69–70); Niles, Michigan, US
- Education: Iowa State University, University of Utah
- Movement: Pacific Wave design movement
- Spouse: Sarah Mercer Keith
- Website: http://www.michaelmabry.com/

Michael Mabry (born 1955) is an American graphic designer, illustrator, educator, and principal at Michael Mabry Design. He was one of the founders of the San Francisco Bay Area postmodern movement in graphic design, that later became known as the "Pacific Wave".

== Biography ==
Michael Mabry was born in 1955 in Niles, Michigan and raised in Park Forest, Illinois. Mabry attended Iowa State University for a year. He then moved in 1974 to the University of Utah to study architecture, but changed focus and instead graduated in 1978 with a BA degree in Graphic Design. In 1979, he was invited to join Nicolas Sidjakov and Jerry Berman at the design firm of Sidjakov & Berman Associates in San Francisco.

In the early 1980s a few San Francisco–based designers were nicknamed “The Michaels” because they all had the same name (Mabry, alongside Cronan, Manwaring, Vanderbyl, Schwab), and later they were known as the "Pacific Wave" according to historian Steven Heller.

In 1981, he opened his own design firm, Michael Mabry Design. Mabry is married to Sarah Mercer Keith, and she is a partner in his design firm. Clients have included The Land of Nod, NetJets Europe, the Andrew Mellon Foundation, Chronicle Books, Hewlett-Packard, and The New York Times. The design for the packaging of Mottura shower curtain rings won awards and was included in I.D. magazine's annual design review in 1994.

Mabry was a founding member of the American Institute of Graphic Art (AIGA) chapter in San Francisco, and served as the first Treasurer and second President. He was awarded the 2014 AIGA Medal. He has taught at California College of the Arts (CCA) in the graphic design department.

Mabry's work is in various public museum collections including the San Francisco Museum of Modern Art (SFMOMA). He has been a member of the Alliance Graphique Internationale (AGI) since 2000.
