= Michael Schwab (designer) =

- Born: 1952 (age 73–74); Ardmore, Oklahoma, US
- Education: East Texas State University, School of Visual Arts, ArtCenter College of Design
- Occupations: Designer, illustrator
- Movement: Pacific Wave design movement
- Website: https://michaelschwab.com/

Michael Schwab (born 1952) is an American graphic designer and illustrator, and principal at Michael Schwab Studio in San Anselmo, California. He was one of the founders of the San Francisco Bay Area postmodern movement in graphic design that later became known as the "Pacific Wave".

== Biography ==
Michael Schwab was born and raised in Ardmore, Oklahoma. In 1970, he attended East Texas State University for two years. It was followed by one year of study of Advertising at School of Visual Arts, and then ArtCenter College of Design, where he received his degree in Graphic Design. In 1975, he moved to San Francisco to work as a poster artist.

In the early 1980s a few San Francisco–based designers were nicknamed “The Michaels” because they all had the same name (Schwab, alongside Mabry, Cronan, Manwaring, Vanderbyl), and later they became known as the "Pacific Wave" according to historian Steven Heller.

Some of Schwab's more popular works were logos designed for the Golden Gate National Parks Conservancy, produced during the 1990s. His clients have included Nike, Wells Fargo, Amtrak, Pebble Beach, Muhammad Ali, Robert Redford, and Californians Against Waste. His work is a part of public museum collections at Fine Arts Museums of San Francisco, San Francisco Museum of Modern Art (SFMoMA), Victoria and Albert Museum, and National Portrait Gallery.

== Bibliography ==
- The Graphic Art of Michael Schwab. Merrill C, Berman (introduction), Denise Urell (introduction). B. Martin Pedersen. 2000. ISBN 9781888001969.
