= G. Dean Smith =

American graphic designer (1932–1987)

- Born: Gordon Dean Smith, Jr. July 13, 1932; Evanston, Illinois, United States
- Died: March 13, 1987 (aged 54); Los Angeles, California, United States
- Education: Pratt Institute (1950–51); Art Center School (1955–56)
- Occupation: Graphic designer
- Spouses: Robin Winslow (m. 1956; div. 1972) Roberta Rahlfs (before 1987)
- Children: 6

Gordon Dean Smith, Jr. (July 13, 1932 – March 13, 1987) was an American graphic designer.

He was perhaps best known for his Circle 7 design for ABC television stations, and his later work alongside Saul Bass.

== Early life ==
Smith was born in Evanston, Illinois on July 13, 1932, the younger of two sons born to Gordon Dean Smith (1897 – 1976), a Scottish-born painter and advertising art director, and Doris Oakley, a printer and dealer of art materials. They would divorce early in his childhood.

Raised in Nyack, New York, he would move with his brother and mother to Palo Alto, California in 1945. He would graduate from Palo Alto High School, and returned to New York to study design at Pratt Institute in 1950. After a year at Pratt, he enlisted in the United States Navy and was assigned to a training aids department where he served as a graphic designer for four years. After his service, he would enroll at the Art Center School in Pasadena in 1955.

== Career ==
=== Early career ===
The Circle 7 logo, designed by Smith in 1962

After a year at Art Center, Smith would briefly work as a designer for Bob Craft & Associates in Palo Alto, later moving to San Francisco by 1957 to join McCann-Erickson. He would leave McCann to open an independent design consultancy in February 1959, though would temporarily rejoin the agency as head art director for its electronics accounts in January 1960.

Under the direction of George T. Rodman, director of advertising and promotions for San Francisco's KGO-TV, Smith designed the Circle 7 logo. Launched on August 27, 1962, the logo soon spread to American Broadcasting Company's other owned-and-operated television stations in New York, Chicago, Detroit and Los Angeles, where it remains in use.

In 1967-68, he would design a unified corporate identity and advertising system for ABC's properties, including a series of symbols for ABC Radio Networks' specialized programming services, a symbol for Marine World (then owned by ABC), as well as billboards advertising local programming, illustrated by Richard Moore.

Also in 1968, he created an identity system for Yosemite National Park, which consisted of circular symbols for supporting park services, as well as brochures and collateral.

During his time as an independent consultant, he also designed logos for Boise Cascade (1963), Coherent Radiation (1966), and Keystone Resort (1974). His work was often geometric, with many of his symbols being circular in form if not rotationally symmetrical.

Designer Michael Vanderbyl began his professional career at Smith's consultancy in 1968, though he would leave in 1970 to join another San Francisco firm. After the establishment of Vanderbyl Design in 1973, the two would collaborate once more, creating the long-standing "Laser 2" logo for KTVU in 1975.

=== With Saul Bass ===
The "globe" logo, designed for American Bell by G. Dean Smith, Jerry Kuyper, and Saul Bass in 1982; later adopted by AT&T in 1983

Smith would relocate to Los Angeles in 1980 to join Bass/Yager & Associates as its third partner. As senior vice president and design director of the firm, he would aid in designing the logos of Geffen Records (1980) and General Foods (1984), among others. His most famous creation under Saul Bass, designed with Jerry Kuyper, was the 1982 "globe" logo for American Bell, which would later be adopted by AT&T as its corporate symbol in the lead-up to the breakup of the Bell System.

Smith, himself a philatelist, was chief designer of a 20-cent postage stamp commemorating science and industry issued by the United States Postal Service in 1983. This design, completed while at Bass/Yager, is often misattributed to Bass alone.

== Personal life and death ==
Smith would marry Robin Winslow, a teacher from San Francisco, on August 4, 1956. They would make a home in Atherton, raising two daughters and two sons before divorcing in 1972. He would later marry Roberta Rahlfs by 1980, with whom he would father two more sons.

On March 13, 1987, G. Dean Smith died in his Laurel Canyon home at the age of 54. His cause of death was unclear, though he was determined to have suffered either a cardiac arrest or a stroke.
