= Tennessee Bottle Bill =

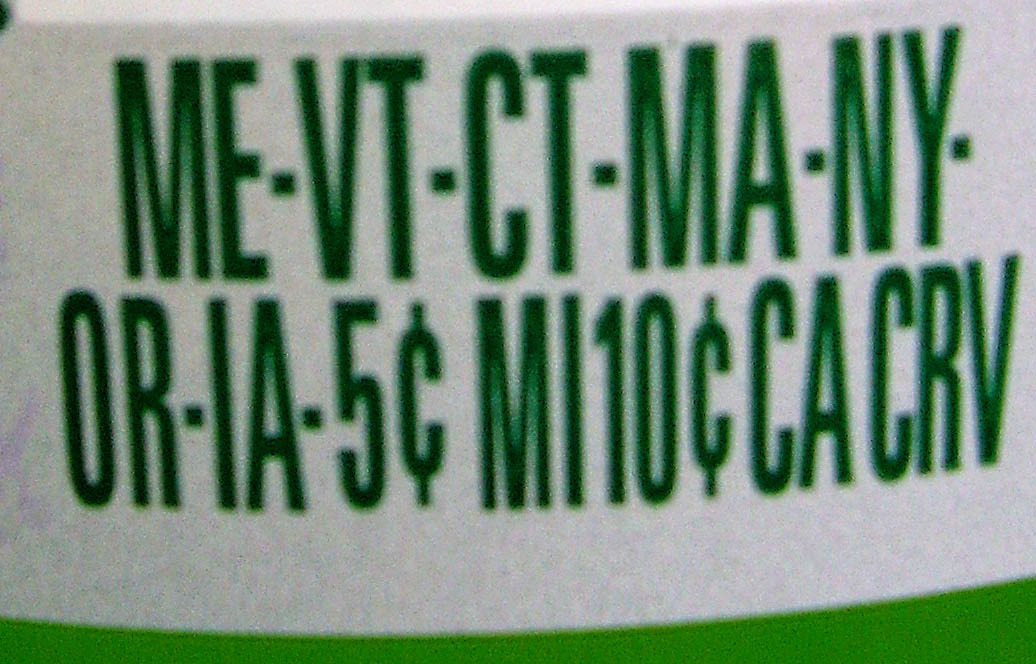
Deposit notice on a bottle sold in continental U.S. indicating the container's deposit value in various states; "CA CRV" means California Redemption Value

The Tennessee Bottle Bill was container-deposit recycling legislation, which proposed placing a 5-cent deposit on beverage containers sold in Tennessee. The bill would have applied to containers made of aluminum, bimetal, glass or any plastic, containing soft drinks, beer and malt beverages, carbonated or non-carbonated waters, plain or flavored waters, energy drinks, juices, iced teas or iced coffees. Milk and dairy, nutritional drinks, and wine and spirits would not have been included in the program.

The chief goals of the measure, also known as TennCan, were to reduce litter, increase recycling, create green jobs, support sustainable manufacturing and generate funding, training and other benefits for social-service agencies, community causes and other nonprofit entities in Tennessee.

== Legislative history ==
The proposed legislation failed in 2004 and was subsequently tied up in committee in the Tennessee General Assembly. The legislation was proposed again in 2009, but failed to gain any traction.

== See also ==
- Container-deposit legislation in the United States
- Recycling in the United States
