= Michael Manwaring =

American designer and artist (born 1942)

- Born: March 21, 1942 (age 83); Palo Alto, California, US
- Education: San Francisco Art Institute
- Movement: Pacific Wave design movement
- Website: https://www.manwaring.com/

Michael Manwaring (born March 21, 1942) is an American designer, artist, and former principal of design firm The Office of Michael Manwaring. He was one of the founders of the San Francisco Bay Area postmodern movement in graphic design, that later became known as the "Pacific Wave".

Manwaring lived in San Francisco for more than 40 years, before moving to Portland, Oregon, in 2006.

== Biography ==
Manwaring was born March 21, 1942, in Palo Alto, California. He also grew up in Palo Alto, near Stanford University, where his father taught.

Manwaring attended San Francisco Art Institute (SFAI) and studied design with Jim Robertson of the Robertson Montgomery design firm, as well as with Gordon Ashby, Barbara Stauffacher Solomon, and Jack Stauffacher. In his early career, he was inspired by the Swiss designer Josef Muller-Brockmann and his 'Beethoven poster'. While in college he started freelance work designing film posters for the San Francisco Surf Theater on Irving Street and 48th Street. He also worked on the IBM-sponsored Astronomia exhibition (1964) at the Hayden Planetarium in New York with designer Gordon Ashby.

Manwarning designed public signage for a number of cities in the Bay Area during the 1970s through 1990s, often integrating large-scale supergraphics. In the 1970s, Manwaring designed an iconic public art sign in the Bayview neighborhood that reads, "India Basin Industrial Park" in concrete letters set in Helvetica font. In 1996, he designed the Embarcadero interpretive signage alongside historian Nancy Leigh Olmstead, a 2.5 mile-long walk along San Francisco's Embarcadero neighborhood with 22 signs sharing historical relevance of the location.

In the 1980s, a few San Francisco–based designers were nicknamed “The Michaels” because they all had the same name (Manwaring, alongside Mabry, Cronan, Vanderbyl, Schwab), and later they became known as the "Pacific Wave" according to the design historian Steven Heller and described by exhibit curator and author Giorgio Camuffo in Pacific Wave: California Graphic Design. Manwaring was known for his projects that incorporated environmental graphics in addition to traditional graphic design.

In 2006, he moved to Portland, Oregon.

Manwaring's work is a part of several public museum collections, including San Francisco Museum of Modern Art (SFMoMA) and Los Angeles County Museum of Art (LACMA).

== Publications ==
- Tropp, Barbara (1996). The Modern Art of Chinese Cooking: Techniques and Recipes. Bill Chiaravalle (illustrator), Allan Rosenberg (photographer), The Office of Michael Manwaring (designer). William Morrow Cookbooks. ISBN 9780688146115.
