= Veronica Scott =

American actress

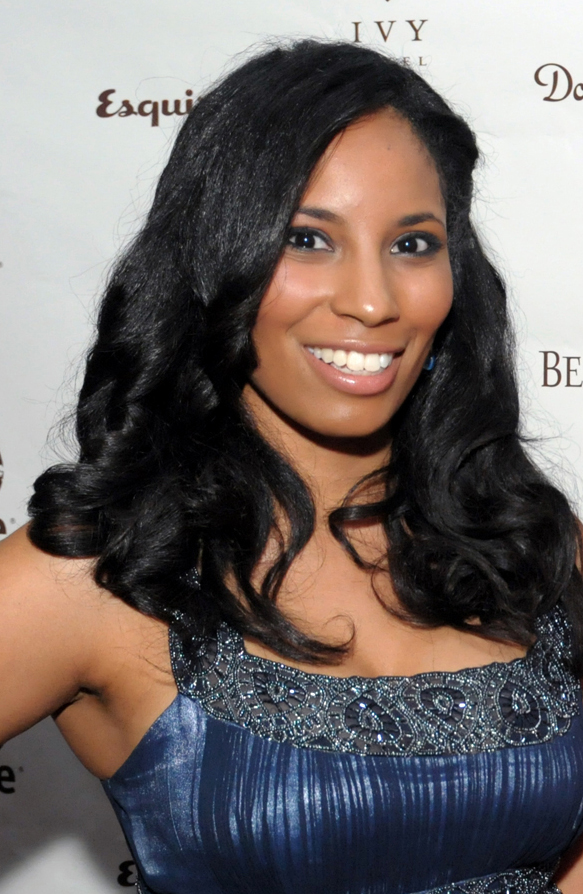
- Born: November 19, 1986 (age 39); Dallas, Texas, U.S.
- Occupations: Fashion designer, television personality, spokesperson
- Website: www.VeronicaScott.com

Veronica Scott (born November 19, 1986) is an American television personality, fashion designer, and entrepreneur. Scott is best known for being featured in the Current TV reality show The Fuchsia Girls, which follows her personal and professional life as she pursues a career in the fashion industry. Scott also co-owns the fashion company and design house Fuchsia with business partner Lawren Pope.

== Early life ==
Scott was born in 1986 in Dallas, Texas, to Johnnie Lee Scott, Jr., and Rebecca Scott. Scott, who is multiracial, is of Hispanic and African American descent. She has one brother, Johnnie Lee Scott III, who is eight years younger than her. Scott attended River Oaks Elementary in Houston from kindergarten to the fifth grade.

Scott began college at private Houston Baptist University as an international business major for three quarters. She then moved from Houston to San Diego and enrolled at the private University of San Diego School of Business Administration. Today, Scott resides in San Diego with longtime friend and Fuchsia co-owner Lawren Pope.

Scott’s lack of art and design schooling has been somewhat of a controversy with a few fashion industry seniors. In a 2008 interview with fashion editor Elizabeth Stein, Scott notes that she has been somewhat "snubbed by certain members of the fashion industry, for not doing any time at a FIDM or Parsons."

== Career ==
=== Fuchsia ===
According to Troy Anderson, staff writer of Los Angeles Daily News, and NBIZ magazine, Scott has always known that she wanted to own a fashion retail business and even “expressed an interest in fashion design as early as age 6." This interest led to the future collaboration with Pope, whom Scott met seven years later at Westside High School.

At age 14, Scott teamed with Pope to open the fashion company Fuchsia. Six months later, they released their first collection of ready-to-wear cocktail attire at a self-produced runway show in Spring, Texas. Scott premiered the video footage of the fashion show on the Fuchsia official site, scoring the interest of several local media journalists. Most of Fuchsia’s early income and public interest can be attributed to this.

Scott designed and created the Fuchsia Official Site. Anderson, who profiled Scott for an article on E-Commerce noted that Scott actually prefers an internet store front to a physical boutique. Scott says that the online boutique works out great, "because we're still in college and we don't have to maintain a storefront 24/7."

=== Save The Girls ===
In 2007, Scott co-founded the 501(c)(3) non-profit organization Save The Girls. Save The Girls provides cash scholarships, scholarship education, and college application assistance to schools, groups, and individual students in need. In 2008, Scott took on the position of chair at the organization.

Save The Girls also sponsors the Grace House in Chișinău, Moldova. In July 2008, Scott traveled on a mission trip for the first time to Moldova with the non-profit Justice and Mercy. During her visit to the Grace House – a transitional home for female graduates of the Internat Orphanage- Scott requested emergency aid funds from Save the Girls to improve the poor living conditions of the girls living in the home. On her return to the U.S., Scott successfully moved to keep funding the Grace House as a Save the Girls project. Scott is currently producing a new web shop for the girls of the Grace House to sell handmade jewelry and clothing. All profits fund the Grace House project.
