= Fuchsia (clothing) =

American fashion company

- Company type: Privately held company
- Industry: Fashion
- Genre: Design House
- Founded: Houston, Texas, US (2004)
- Founder: Veronica Scott; Lawren Pope
- Headquarters: San Diego, US
- Area served: International
- Key people: Veronica Scott; Lawren Pope
- Products: Apparel; Handbags; Accessories
- Owner: Veronica Scott; Lawren Pope
- Website: www.fuchsiaclothingline.com

Fuchsia was an American fashion company and design house run by Veronica Scott and Lawren Pope, based San Diego. Fuchsia specializes in women's fashion, handbags, and accessories.

== History ==
Fuchsia began as a small Houston-based fashion retail company. Scott and Pope's first venture was selling accessories and handbags to classmates during their second year at Westside High School. With the capital from the initial accessory sales, Scott and Pope created their first collection of ready-to-wear cocktail dresses. In 2004, Scott and Pope hosted their first Fuchsia runway show in Spring, Texas. Among the crowd were Texan socialites and Houston boutique owners who all previewed the first pieces of the Fuchsia collection. The same year Scott and Pope added a new custom design service, creating custom couture gowns for wealthy Houstonians. Through word-of-mouth Fuchsia's clientele grew and the company soon caught the attention of journalist Taslin Alfonzo, who profiled Fuchsia for Fox News in 2005. Alfonso predicted that it wouldn't be long before everyone would, "soon see Fuchsia in the latest fashion magazines." One year after high school graduation Scott and Pope moved the Fuchsia headquarters to San Diego, California, where they would both attend college as business majors and continue to grow the company.

== E-Commerce ==
On May 13, 2004 Fuchsia opened its virtual doors. Four years later in 2008, Troy Anderson, Staff Writer of Los Angeles Daily News, wrote that Scott and Pope had indeed "…capitalized on the boom in internet retailing." The boutique located at www.FuchsiaOnline.com offers the Fuchsia clothing line, as well as a few select high-end designer gowns and accessories from other exclusive fashion houses. The site generated most of Fuchsia's early press, including the first live broadcast of a Fuchsia runway show. Elissa Rivas, a correspondent for ABC KTRK-TV interviewed Scott and Pope for ABC's behind the scenes coverage of the last known Fuchsia runway show to take place in Houston. Scott, also the webmaster for FuchsiaOnline.com, prefers ecommerce to a physical boutique. Scott says that the web boutique works out great, "because we're still in college and we don't have to maintain a storefront 24/7." She and Pope might expand the boutique physically after college, since they still have to "keep up with school work."

== Philanthropy ==
=== Save the Girls Scholarship Foundation ===
On March 28, 2007, Fuchsia opened its first 501(c)(3) non-profit called Save the Girls. The organization's mission is to "bridge the gap between bright disadvantaged young women and higher level schooling by providing educational and financial support, as well as access to the best resources we have to offer." Save The Girls offers this financial support through The Save the Girls Scholarship Fund which provides funding for financially challenged girls who plan to study business in college. News of the Save the Girls Scholarship Foundation sparked the interest of reporter Dominique Sachse of the NBC KPRC-TV Staff. Sachse, a fellow Houston philanthropist, announced she would produce a special interview with the owners of Fuchsia to help raise startup funds for Save the Girls. The interview aired September 6, 2006, and was the last Fuchsia interview taped in Houston before the company's move to the west coast.

=== Conservation Movement ===
As part of the conservation movement, and Fuchsia's "Fuchsia Goes Green" campaign, Save The Girls offers a free curbside recycling service for California homeowners, schools, and businesses. The California Redemption Value proceeds from recycling help finance the Save the Girls Scholarship Fund. FuchsiaOnline.com also includes a "Scholarship Shop" that offers T-shirts and totes donning slogans such as "I Saved the Girls," "Save the Girls Now," and "Pink is the New Green," to which profits also benefit the Save the Girls Scholarship Foundation.
