= Circle 7 logo =

Television station logo

The Circle 7 logo

The Circle 7 logo is an often-used television station logo in the United States. Designed in the early 1960s for the American Broadcasting Company's five owned-and-operated stations (all of which broadcast on VHF channel 7), the logo, or a version of it, is being used not only by several ABC stations and affiliates, but also by a number of television broadcasters around the world, most notably GMA Network in the Philippines, ntv7 in Malaysia, TV7 (now Trans7) in Indonesia, and TV Record in Brazil.

== History and information ==
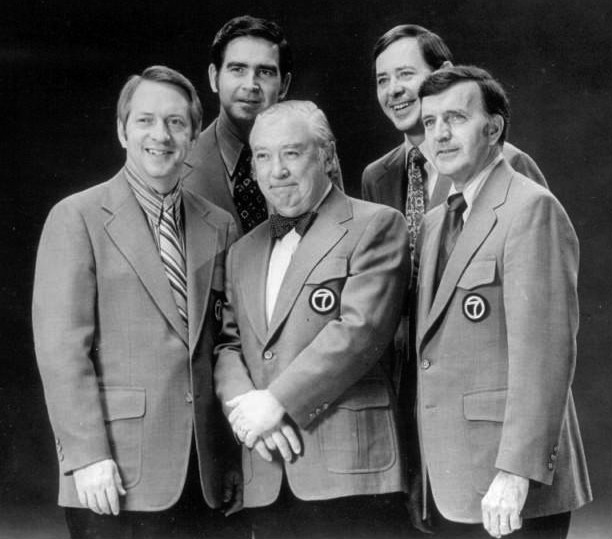
Members of WLS-TV's Eyewitness News team wearing blazers adorned with a Circle 7 patch, c. 1972.

The Circle 7 logo was initially designed for San Francisco ABC affiliate KGO-TV by local graphic designer G. Dean Smith, under the direction of George T. Rodman, director of advertising and promotions for KGO (and later director of creative services for ABC's owned and operated stations). The logo would make its debut on August 27, 1962.

Within the decade, the Circle 7 would soon be adopted by ABC's four other owned-and-operated television stations: WABC-TV in New York City; KABC-TV in Los Angeles; WBKB in Chicago; and WXYZ-TV in Detroit. When ABC applied for television station licenses in the late 1940s, it was thought that the low-band channel frequencies (2 through 6) would be removed from use for television broadcasting, thus making these five stations broadcasting on VHF channel 7 the lowest on the television dial; those plans never came to pass. American Broadcasting-Paramount Theatres, ABC's then-corporate parent, registered the Circle 7 logo with the U.S. Patent and Trademark Office in 1962.

When WABC-TV adopted the Eyewitness News format in January 1968, all reporters and anchors were required to wear a blazer with a Circle 7 patch (a lapel pin in later years) when they appeared on the air – a marketing practice that spread to the other ABC O&Os, and eventually to other ABC affiliates. Stations commonly used the logo on microphone flags, newscaster clothing and design of sets, as well as on-air graphics for locally originated programming. In most cases, the symbol has also been co-branded with the logo of ABC itself. By February 2026, ABC had standardized the appearance of the logo across its owned-and-operated stations, when KABC and KGO notably switched to using the version of the logo used by WABC (where the ABC logo is vertically aligned with the center of the Circle 7, rather than positioned at its bottom-left corner).

Circle Seven Animation, a short-lived (2005-2006) division of ABC parent company Disney that was working on sequels to Disney-owned Pixar films, was indirectly named after the logo, as its studios were located on Circle Seven Drive in Glendale, California, a street which was renamed for the logo when KABC-TV moved its studios there.

== Gallery ==
Logo used for WABC-TV in New York, KABC-TV in Los Angeles, WLS-TV in Chicago, and KGO-TV in San Francisco.

Logo used for WJLA-TV in Washington, D.C. A similar logo is used for KATV in Little Rock, Arkansas, and KRCR-TV in Redding, California.

WXYZ-TV logo in Detroit, Michigan. Buffalo ABC affiliate, WKBW-TV, used a similar logo from September 2014 to December 2021.

WWSB logo in Sarasota, Florida

KOAT-TV logo in Albuquerque, New Mexico

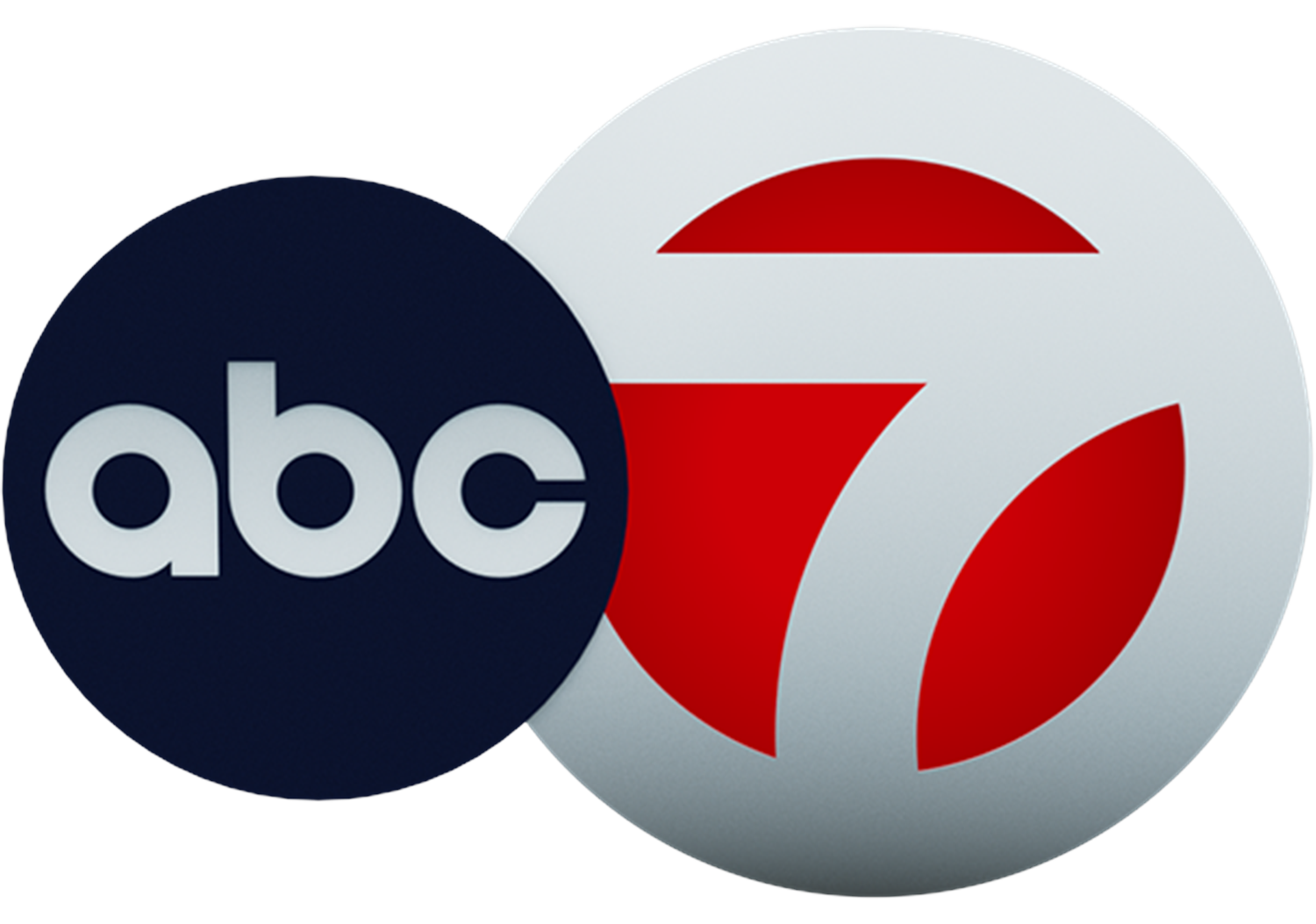
KVIA-TV logo in El Paso, Texas

KVII-TV 2015 logo in Amarillo, Texas (and a satellite station KVIH-TV in Clovis, New Mexico)

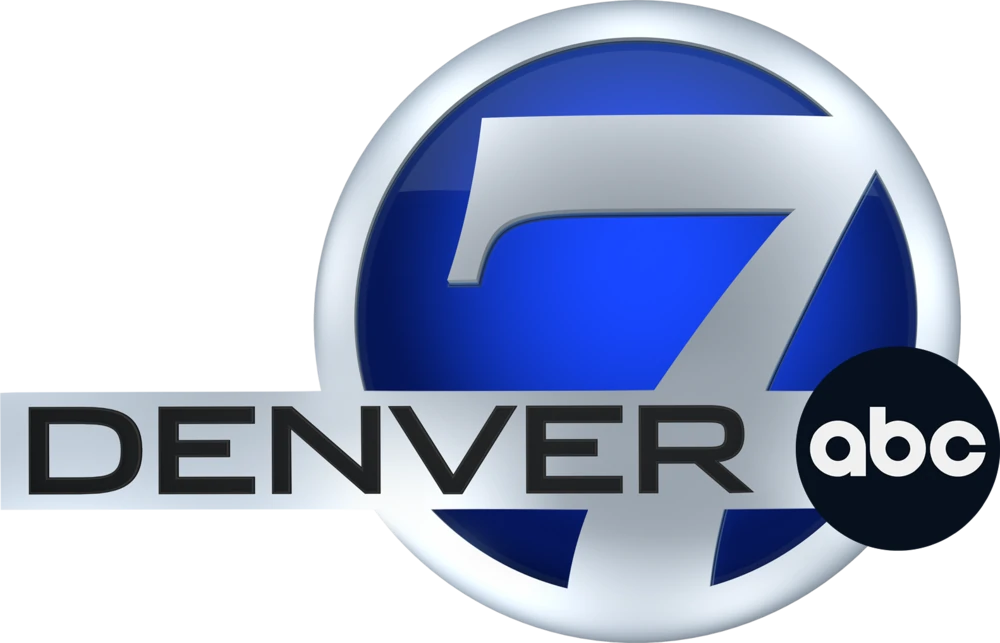
KMGH-TV logo in Denver, Colorado

Logo used for both WSVN in Miami, Florida, and WHDH in Boston, Massachusetts.

== See also ==
- American Broadcasting Company logos
- Enclosed Alphanumerics, a section of Unicode that includes circle-IRP dingbats (e.g. ➆)

== Sources ==
Media related to Circle 7 logo at Wikimedia Commons

- "New '7' logo designed for KGO-TV (ch.7)" (PDF file), Broadcasting, August 27, 1962, p. 72.
- "Designed Symbols for AT&T, ABC Stations Dean Smith; Corporate Logo Creator", Los Angeles Times, March 28, 1987
