= 3,000 mile myth =

Common belief that motor vehicles should have motor oil changed every 3,000 miles

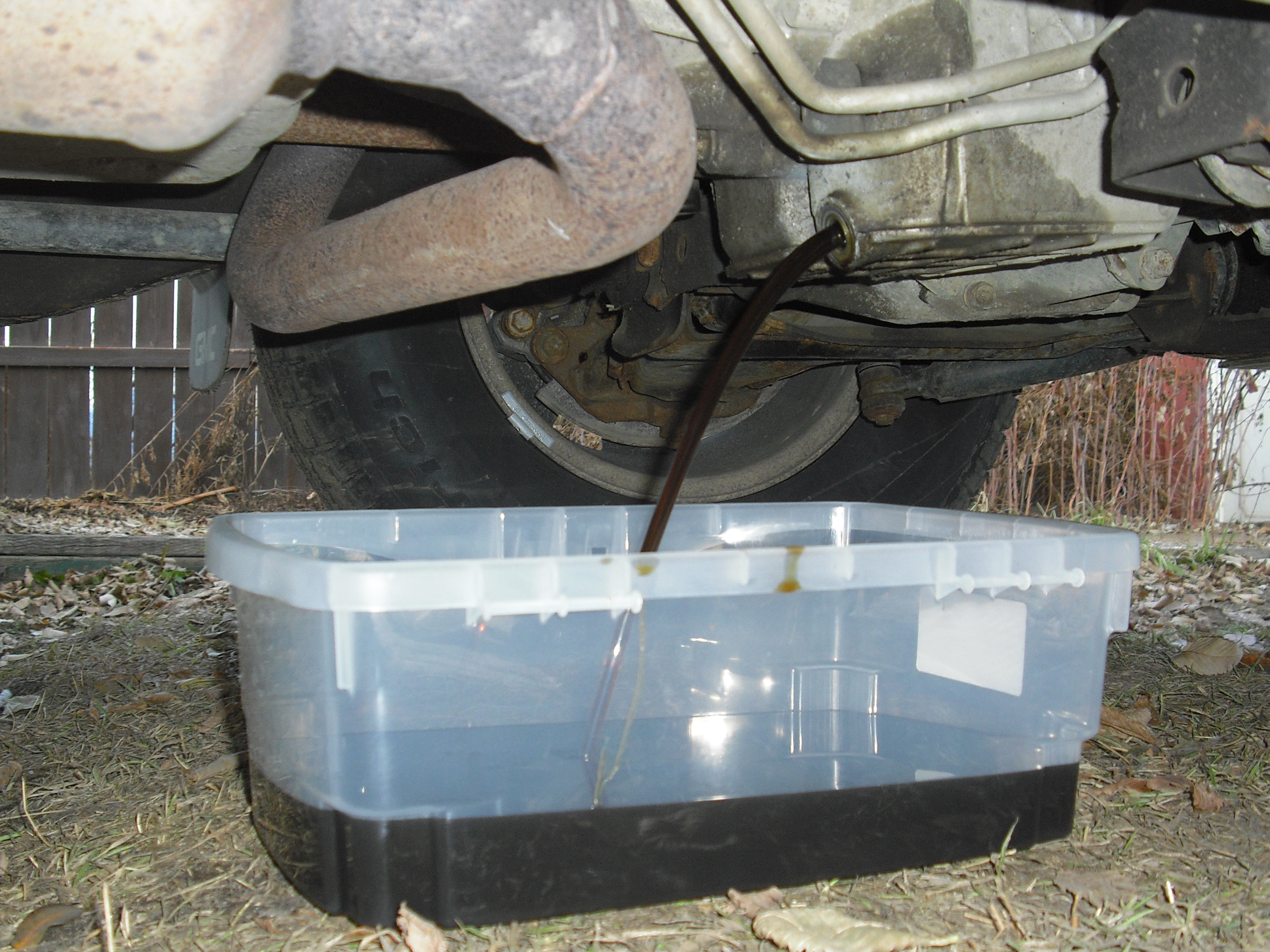
Oil being drained from an engine

The 3,000 mile myth refers to a common belief, particularly in the United States, that all motor vehicles should have their motor oil changed at least every 3,000 miles (4,800 km) to maintain their car engine. Efforts are under way to convince the public that this is not necessary and that people should follow the advice given in their owner's manual rather than the advice of oil-change businesses. With modern synthetic oils and new tests such as BMW's LL ("long life") oil specifications, most current cars can go over 6,000 miles (9,700 km) before needing an oil change. Even most modern conventional oils (also called mineral oils) can take a car engine at least 5,000 miles (8,000 km) before needing an oil change.

While paying attention to a car's mileage in between oil changes is important, it is not the only factor to take into consideration when deciding if it is time to get an oil change. Some people may not drive their vehicles the advised mileage given by their owner's manual before needing an oil change. Therefore, it is still advised to get the oil changed in a car twice a year. This helps keep the oil fresh and maintain the life of the car's engine. Though a person may follow all of these guidelines to keep up on proper maintenance of their car by taking it in for its recommended oil changes, this does not guarantee that nothing will go wrong with a car's engine. Many newer model vehicles have indicators that show the oil life of a car, but it is always good practice to check to oil oneself to prevent any issues that may happen.
