= Container deposit legislation in the United States =

Overview of the container deposit legislation in United States of America

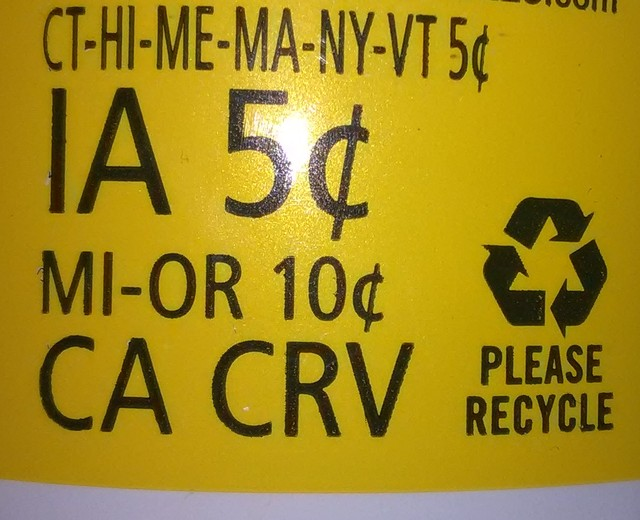
Deposit notice on a bottle sold in continental U.S. indicating the container's deposit value in various states; "CA CRV" means California Cash Redemption Value

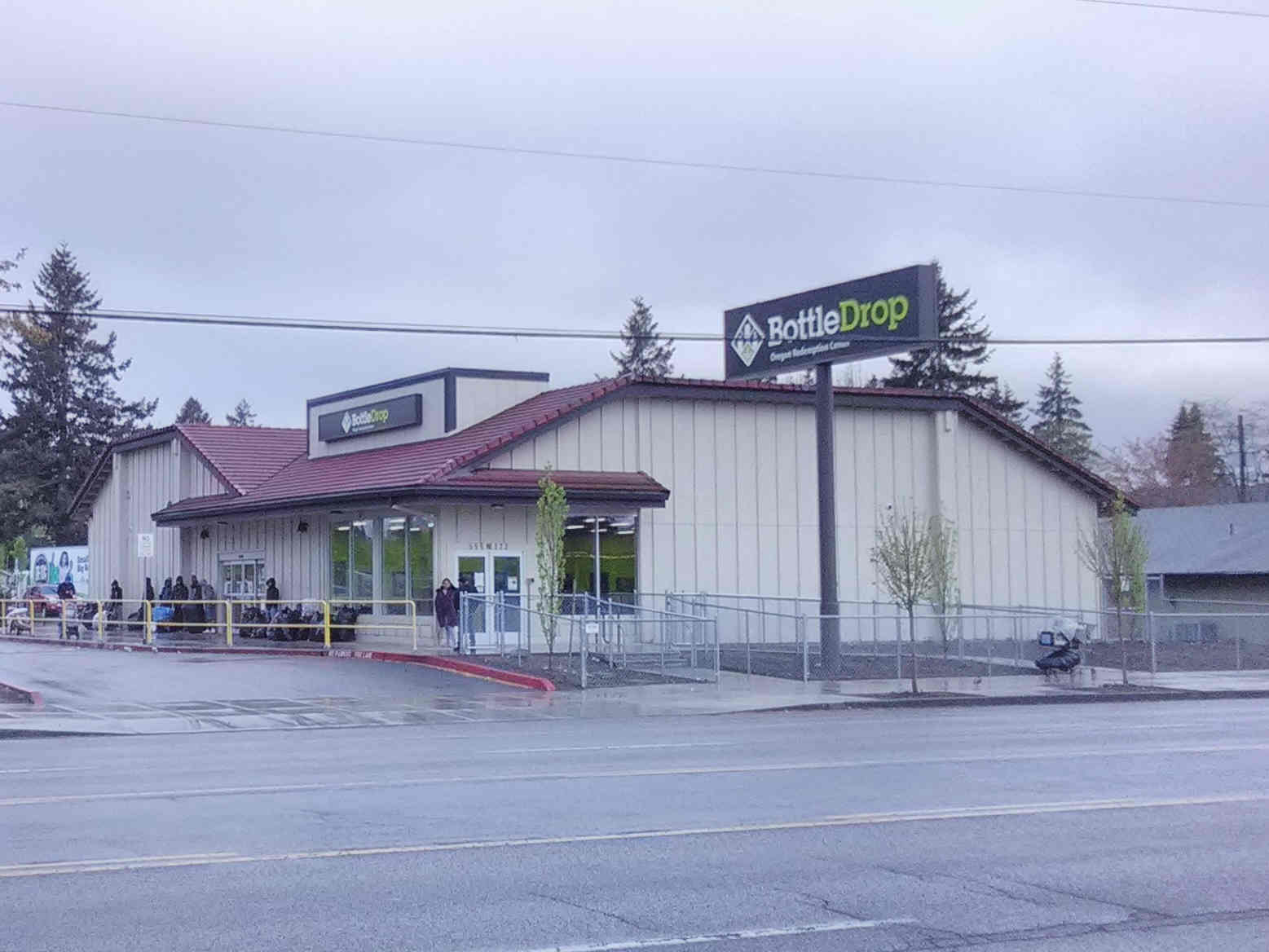
A beverage container redemption center in Portland, Oregon

There are ten states in the United States of America with container deposit legislation, popularly called "bottle bills" after the Oregon Bottle Bill, the first such legislation that was passed.

Container deposit legislation (CDL) requires a refundable deposit on certain types of recyclable beverage containers in order to ensure an increased recycling rate. Studies show that the recycling rate for beverage containers is vastly increased with a bottle bill. The United States' overall beverage container recycling rate is approximately 33%, while states with container deposit laws have a 70% average rate of beverage container recycling. Michigan's recycling rate of 97% from 1990 to 2008 was the highest in the nation, as is its 10¢ deposit. Numerous instances of criminal offenses motivated by the cash refund value of empty containers have been reported.

Proponents of container deposit legislation have pointed to the small financial responsibilities of the states. Financing these programs are the responsibility of the beverage industry and consumers. Producers are responsible for disposing of returned products, while consumers are responsible for collecting their refunds.

In Connecticut, Maine, Michigan, and Massachusetts the courts have ruled that unclaimed deposits are deemed abandoned by the public and are therefore property of the state. In California and Hawaii uncollected deposits are used to cover the administrative costs of the deposit program. In Iowa and Oregon the beverage distribution industry keeps the unredeemed deposits. Iowa and Oregon's systems are similar and it was found to be highly profitable for beverage distributors in Iowa. Between March 11, 2020, and June 2020, most states with container deposit legislation, except for California and Hawaii, temporarily suspended the bottle bill requirements as a result of the COVID-19 pandemic.

== US states and Canadian provinces with container deposits ==
US States with a bottle bill by date enacted
year	state
1971	Oregon
1972	Vermont
1976	Maine
1976	Michigan
1978	Connecticut
1978	Iowa
1982	Massachusetts
1982	New York
1986	California
2002	Hawaii

Container-deposit legislation in North America. Container deposits on most bottles and cans Container deposits only on beer/alcoholic beverage containers Container deposits discontinued No container deposits

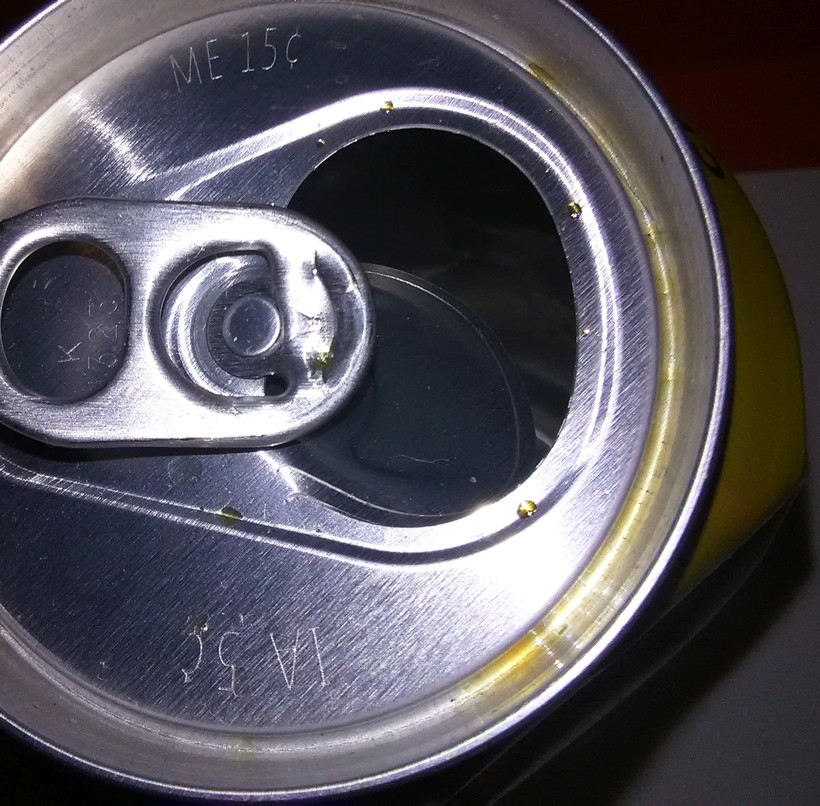
Canned wine with Iowa 5¢ and Maine 15¢ insignia

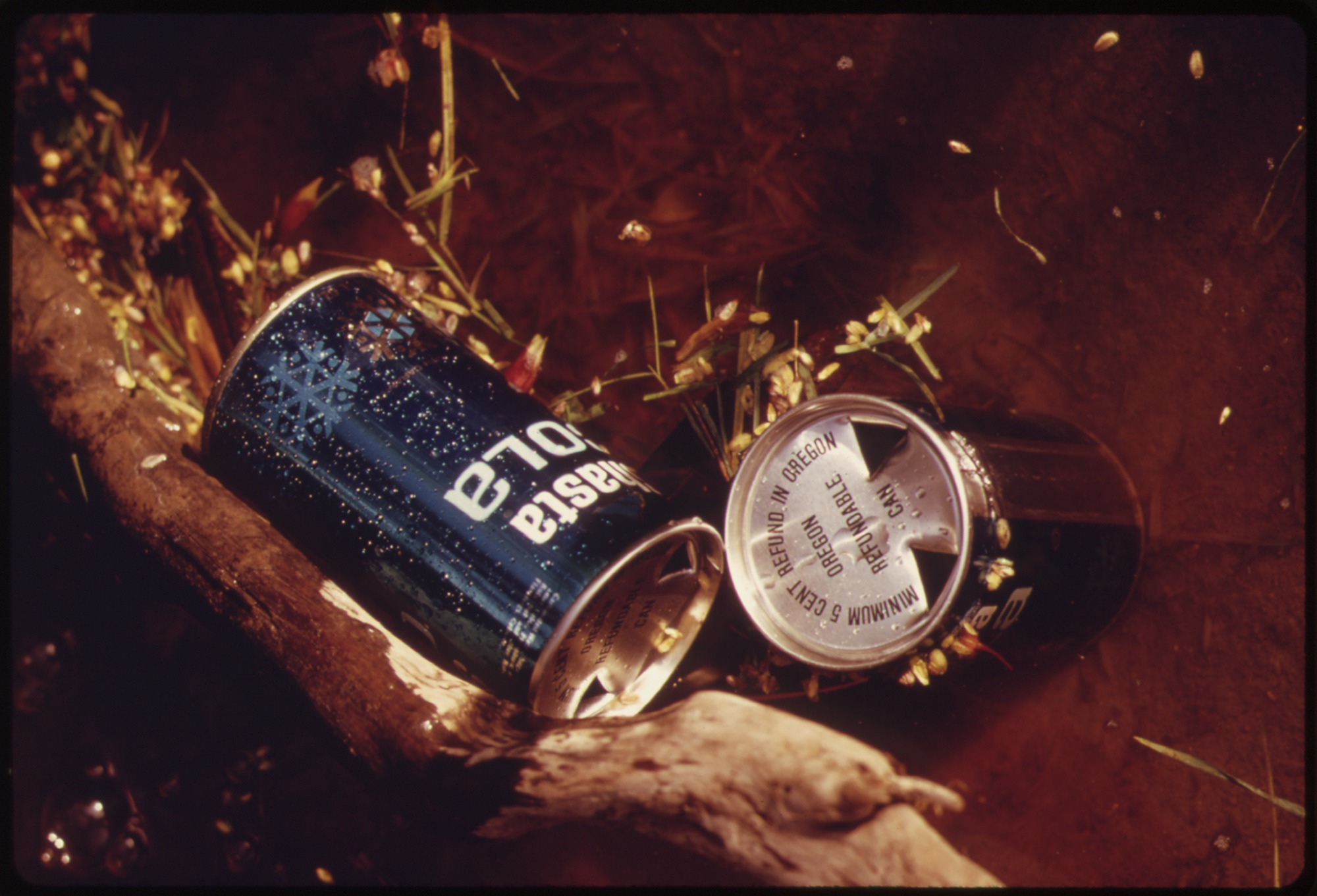
Cans discarded less than two years after the Oregon Bottle Bill was passed.

- California (5¢; for bottles 24 U.S. fl oz (710 mL) or greater, 10¢; boxed wine, wine pouches and cartons 25¢), California Beverage Container Recycling and Litter Reduction Act (AB 2020) implemented in 1987, last revision made January 2024. Listed on containers as "California Redemption Value", or "CRV", or "CA Cash Refund" or similar notations. Beverages covered under the act are beer and malt beverages, distilled spirit coolers or cocktails, wine and wine coolers, and all non-alcoholic beverages except milk. Other notable exclusions from CRV are medical food and baby formula. Container types are aluminum, glass, wine boxes with bag or pouches, plastic resins 1–7, bi-metals (exempts refillables). The recycling rate for beverage containers of all materials in 2011 was 82%. California imposes sales tax on the CRV if the beverage is taxable. The sales tax is not refunded to consumers upon redeeming the empty containers to a recycling center. Some recycling centers have attracted drug activity and crimes. In one example in Haight-Ashbury, a recycling center was ordered shut down by the city in 2012 due to drug activity crime.
- Connecticut (10¢). Beverage Container Deposit and Redemption Law 1980; not charged on milk (deposit on water bottles went into effect October 1, 2009). The deposit was increased from 5¢ to 10¢ on January 1, 2024. Applies to beer, carbonated soft drinks (including mineral water and soda waters) and non-carbonated beverages; "noncarbonated beverages" means water, including flavored water, nutritionally enhanced water and any beverage that is identified through the use of letters, words or symbols on such beverage's product label as a type of water, but excluding juice and mineral water. Beverage container types include bottles, jars, or cartons made from glass, metal, or plastic.
- Hawaii (5¢), Solid Waste Management Deposit Beverage Container Law (Act 176). Enacted in June 2002. In addition, Hawaii charges a nonrefundable 1¢ fee per container to fund the program. This fee increases to 1.5¢ if the redemption rate reaches 70%. Containers of aluminum, bi-metal, glass, plastic (PETE and HDPE) up to 68 U.S. fl oz (2.01 L). All non-alcoholic beverage (excluding dairy), beer, malt, mixed spirits, and wine. Seventy-six percent redemption rate.
- Iowa (5¢ for containers that held carbonated beverages), Beverage Container Deposit Law 1978. Beverages of beer, wine coolers, wine, liquor, soda pop, mineral water. Bottles, cans, jars, or cartons made of glass, plastic, or metal. Iowa code 455C requires that retailers take back containers of what they sell and it is a misdemeanor to fail to comply. The Des Moines Register reports officials say enforcement is almost non-existent and in the example covered by the news in December 2020, Menards only accepted the containers after the police were summoned and the store was ordered by the police officer to accept them.
- Maine (5¢ on fruit juice, soda, beer and bottled water; 15¢ for most liquor and wine cans/bottles), Maine Returnable Beverage Container Law 1978. All potable liquids, except dairy and unprocessed cider. All glass, metal, or plastic containers 4 L (135 U.S. fl oz) or smaller, excluding blueberry juice and apple cider produced in Maine. Redemption centers are paid a processing fee of 3 to 4¢ per container by the distributor. There are some redemption centers that pay the clients in excess of deposit value, sharing part of the fee they receive from the distributor to encourage them to conduct business at the store. A redemption provider called CLYNK operates a drop-off redemption processing service in collaboration with Hannaford stores. The customer creates an account, drops off bags filled with cans, and receives the deposit into their account after the containers have been counted. In October 2019, a CLYNK customer complained to WGME-TV alleging that CLYNK counted incorrectly four out of five times. The news channel's investigative team conducted their own test dropping off two bags that have been counted twice, loaded with $8.85 worth of containers. CLYNK shorted the news team by $1.15.
- Massachusetts Bottle Bill (5¢ for containers that held carbonated beverages), Beverage Container Recovery Law enacted in 1982. Beverages include beer, malt, soda, mineral water in jars, cartons, bottles, or cans made of glass, metal, plastic, or a combination. The redemption rate of covered containers is 33%, though due to an increase in sales of non-carbonated beverages, over 30% of beverage containers sold are not covered and are recycled at a much lower rate.
- Michigan (10¢ non-refillable, 10¢ refillable), Michigan Beverage Container Act of 1976. For beverages of beer, pop, carbonated and mineral water, wine coolers, canned cocktails. In containers made of metal, glass, paper, or plastic under 1 U.S. gal (3.79 L). Redemption rate was 98.2% in 1990, 75.6% in 2022. Escheated deposits are divided as: 75% to State Cleanup and Redevelopment Trust Fund, 25% returned to retailers. The lowest redemption limit per person per day allowed to be set by retailer is $25 in deposits. Disposal of beverage containers in the trash is illegal in Michigan. About 55% of beverages in Michigan are subject to deposit. Since 2020, all parties in the distribution chain are required to begin collecting and refunding deposits on kombucha, effectively adding kombucha to the list of accepted drinks in Michigan.
- New York (5¢), New York State Returnable Container Law 1982. For containers under one gallon, that held carbonated beverages or water (the law was amended to include water containers on October 31, 2009) Beverages include beer, malt beverages, soda, juice spritzers containing added water or sugar, wine product, and bottled water without added sugar. Hard cider and wine are exempt from the deposit, whether or not they are carbonated. Container types are metal, glass, paper, plastic or a combination under 1 U.S. gal (3.79 L). Overall redemption rates as of 2007 were 66%; 76% for beer, 56.6% for soda, and 64.7% for wine product. Redemption limit is 240 containers per person, per day, but this can be circumvented by notifying the business at least 48 hours in advance, in which case the business is compelled to take any amount. In addition, any store that sells a product with a deposit, is required to take it back and refund the deposit. As of March 2010, all business which sell beverages in beverages containers for consumption off site and are part of a chain of businesses of 10 or more under common ownership are required to install 3–8 reverse vending machines on their premises depending on area of the business. In 2024, New York proposed a bill that will increase the bottle deposit from 5¢ to 10¢.
- Oregon (10¢), the Oregon Bottle Bill passed in 1971. Covered beverages carry a mandatory refund value, which means a redemption value must be paid upon presentation of containers, however, retailers are not required to charge the deposit. Beverages covered include beer, malt, soda, bottled water, juice, coffee, kombucha, coconut water, ready-to-use mixers, nutritional supplements, smoothies, protein shakes, non-alcoholic wine, drinking vinegar, marijuana beverages, sports drinks, energy drinks and most other beverages. The only exceptions are for wine, liquor, dairy or plant-based milk, meal replacement beverages, and infant formula. Included are bottles, cans, or jars made of glass, metal, or plastic. Redemption rate has been as high as 94%, but dropped to 83% by 2005 and to 64.5% in 2015, the decline ultimately triggering a scheduled increase in the redemption value to 10¢ effective April 2017. As of 2023, 88% of beverages in Oregon are subject to deposit.
- Vermont (5¢; for most liquor bottles, 15¢), Beverage Container Law 1973. Includes beer, malt, soda, mixed wine drinks, liquor. Containers included are bottles, cans, jars, or cartons composed of glass, metal, paper, plastic, or a combination. Of overall beverages sold in Vermont, 46% were covered by deposit in 2019. Redemption rate in 2022 was 72.3% which is a six percent drop from the previous year.

== Repealed legislation ==
- Delaware (5¢), Beverage Container Regulation 1982 [Repealed in 2009]. Included beer, malt, ale, soft drinks, mineral water, soda water, and covered all containers under 2 U.S. qt (1.89 L) (with the exception of aluminum). Container deposit legislation was repealed by Senate Bill 234. As of December 1, 2010, consumers no longer paid a deposit on containers; no refunds were paid after February 1, 2011. Delaware had a non-refundable 4¢ tax per beverage container sold, which retailers remitted to the state monthly. This fee expired as of December 1, 2014.

== Proposed legislation ==
There have regularly been campaigns in the early 21st century to introduce container-deposit laws in various U.S. states and territories, or to improve or expand existing legislation, including but not limited to the following initiatives:

- Washington state. Bottle bill has been proposed several times. In 1970 (nay: 51%), 1979 (nay 57%), 1982 (nay 70%), 2023 and 2024. The 2023 and 2024 proposals were modeled after Oregon's system.
- Texas unsuccessfully attempted to introduce a bottle bill into legislation in 2011. The bill set a redemption goal of 75%, with a deposit rate of 10¢ for containers 24 U.S. fl oz (710 mL) or less, and 15¢ for larger containers. Beverages covered would have been: beer, malt, carbonated soft drinks, mineral water, wine, coffee, tea, juices, flavored waters, and non-carbonated waters (dairy products excluded). Containers made of glass, plastic or aluminum-containing a beverage of 4 L (1.1 U.S. gal) or less would have been covered. The Texas bottle bill did not gather enough votes.
- Tennessee had attempted to pass the Tennessee Bottle Bill in 2009 and 2010, which was projected to increase its recycling rate from 10% to 80%.
- The Massachusetts legislature failed over several sessions to expand its bottle law to cover bottled water and sports drinks in line with its New England neighbors. Massachusetts environmental activists attempted a ballot petition in November 2014. The bill failed 27% to 73%. The beverage industry funded over 80% of a more than $9 million campaign, which outspent environmental groups by a margin of more than 6 to 1.
- New Jersey is attempting to pass a bottle bill that will set a 10¢ deposit for bottles and cans, hoping to raise the recycling rate.

== Controversy ==
=== Use as a social service program ===
While bottle bills were originally intended to incentivize people to return their own containers, the redemption value is often too low for them to bother. This has led to bottle redemption evolving into a lifeline for low-income people and the homeless. Debate arose as to whether canners, people who collect and redeem bottles and cans for a living, should be considered a legitimate part of society and the economy, or whether they are contributing to open-air drug markets in places such as Oregon, where the original bottle bill was passed. This has led to calls to replace the cash rewards with food assistance or store credit instead in order to acknowledge the bills' actual use as a social service program, and prevent the money from being spent on illicit goods.

=== Burden on consumers ===
While noted as drastically increasing recycling rates, controversy arose in jurisdictions such as New York as to whether the bottle deposit fees place an undue burden on consumers. This has led to attempts to raise the fee further, to 10¢, being abandoned. Opponents have characterized bottle bills as a form of taxation. Proponents countered by saying consumers could voluntarily get the money back, although US$125 million in unclaimed deposits are collected yearly by the New York State government alone.

=== Criminal offenses related to container deposits ===
Numerous instances of criminal offenses have occurred motivated by the cash refund value of empty containers, such as theft of cases of water from a retail store, burglary into a concession stand, welfare fraud, and theft of bagged empties from a private residence. In Salem, Oregon, the Douglas McKay High School athletic concession stand was burgled, where approximately ten 24 pack cases of beverages were emptied inside the building and empty containers stolen. The vice president of the club suggested the thieves committed the crime of returning empties for cash at the BottleDrop redemption facility nearby. A Medford, Oregon woman was charged with theft of $40 worth of bottled water from Albertsons. A video of the same woman dumping the empty bottles at the BottleDrop facility operated by the Oregon Beverage Recycling Cooperative has circulated on the Internet. A parolee from Wayne County, New York was charged with illegal exchange/sale of items purchased on food stamps following a purchase of 1,000 bottles of bottled water and dumping them out to cash out on the container deposit. A machete-wielding male subject was observed taking a bag of empty cans set aside on the porch in front of the house and was confronted by a neighbor in Medford, Oregon.

In July 2020, an Aloha, Oregon transient attacked another man who was scavenging refundable containers in a residential neighborhood to steal his cans.

==== Recycling fraud ====
One form of fraud is redeeming containers brought in from a different state that does not have a deposit or has a lower one. Such a scheme was brought to the awareness of popular culture in the 1990s by the Seinfeld episode "The Bottle Deposit". In 2022, a family in Oakland redeemed 178 tons of containers brought from Arizona, defrauding the state of $7.6 million in deposit payment. In 2017, A Flint man was arrested for buying cans from Indiana to redeem in Michigan, defrauding the system out of more than $1k. In 2023, a Los Angeles ring was arrested in a bust worth more than $4.3 million. In 2007, 13 out of 15 people in a Detroit ring were arrested in a bust called "Operation Can Scam" worth more than $500k. In 2017, a New York ring of five was arrested for smuggling bottles and cans from New Jersey to New York, amongst other crimes involving recycling.

In 2018, the Washington transit agency C-Tran banned large bags of empty bottles and cans on its buses due to issues with passengers bringing them onto bus lines that cross the border into Oregon. Oregon has a deposit and Washington does not.

Another variation of recycling fraud involves falsifying recycling records to secure illicit profits. In 2017, a New York ring of five was arrested for returning the same bottles twice, as well as other crimes committed to falsely inflate the number of bottles they returned. This ring would also commit bottle smuggling (see above). In 2023, a Sandusky, Michigan man was arrested for returning fake bottle slips, and is suspected of being connected to a large scheme also targeting Lapeer, Bay City, and other cities. In 2019, a Grand Rapids group of five was arrested for returning photocopied bottle slips at numerous Meijer stores in a bust worth thousands of dollars. Using a Eugene Taco Bell as their office, two Oregon men were arrested and more are suspected to be involved in a ring that produced more than 100 fake bottle slips worth $14.40 each.

Connecticut raised the redemption value from 5 cents to 10 cents in January 2024 and in the months following the change, an influx of people trucking in bottles and cans from neighboring states of Massachusetts, New Jersey, Rhode Island and New York where there is no deposit or lower deposit. Although it is illegal to redeem containers brought in from other states, as of July 2025, there is generally no way to tell apart where the containers were originally sold. It has only been a civil infraction, however in 2026 Connecticut is in the process of criminalizing out-of-state container redemption in quantities exceeding 5,000.

== See also ==
- Container-deposit legislation
- Environment of the United States
- History of bottle recycling in the United States
- Recycling in the United States
