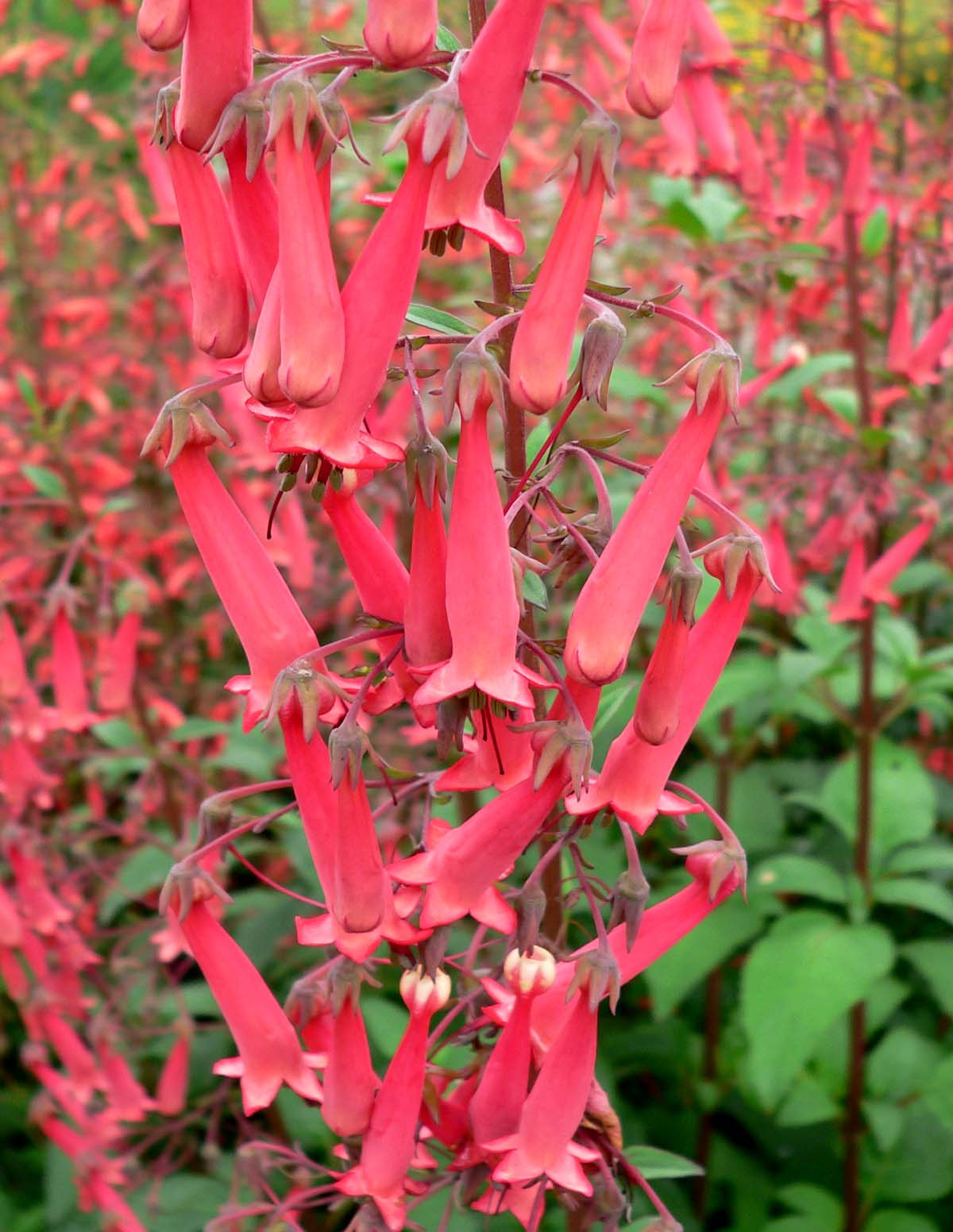

Scientific classification
- Kingdom: Plantae
- Clade: Tracheophytes
- Clade: Angiosperms
- Clade: Eudicots
- Clade: Asterids
- Order: Lamiales
- Family: Scrophulariaceae
- Genus: Phygelius
- Species: P. capensis

Binomial name
- Phygelius capensis E.Mey. ex Benth.

= Phygelius capensis =

Species of plant

Phygelius capensis, the cape figwort or cape fuchsia, is a species of flowering plant in the family Scrophulariaceae, native to South Africa and Lesotho.

== Description ==
It is a semi-evergreen shrub growing to 120 cm (47 in) tall by 150 cm (59 in) wide. The oval leaves are up to 9 cm (4 in). Throughout summer it produces upright panicles, 60 cm (24 in) long, of narrowly tubular flowers 5 cm (2 in) long. The flowers are of an orange-pink colour along the outline of the petals, with a yellow center. There are five green leaves on every flower, and each leaf has a small point on it, which is referred to as a tooth of the leaf. The flowers often point back towards the stem. They also surround the stem, unlike P. aequalis where the flowers appear all on one side of the stem. The plant has an exceptionally long blooming season of roughly six months, from May to November.

This plant has gained the Royal Horticultural Society's Award of Garden Merit.

== Names ==
The common name "cape fuchsia" derives from the flowers' passing resemblance to fuchsias, though they are not closely related. The name "figwort" is applied to several plants, including other members of the Scrophulariaceae.

== Growing and maintaining ==
Phygelius capensis is a very easy plant to grow and take care of. The plant grows well in most fertile soils but may require some winter protection in colder areas. Because the plant can take care of itself, it is an easy plant for beginner gardeners to grow. It requires full sunlight and thus is generally only an outdoor plant. The plant is extremely versatile because it can survive in almost any kind of soil; normal, sandy or clay with a pH level of neutral, alkaline, or acid, however it prefers a rich, well-draining soil with regular watering. Cape fuchsias are easily grown from seeds collected the previous year. The plants form a woody base and should be pruned back to 6 inches or so each spring. Once established and actively growing, it they should be fed monthly with a good all-purpose fertilizer. Other than this, for the most part the plant will take care of itself. Once established it will run by underground stems and is considered invasive by some. In warm climates, P. capensis grows as a perennial plant, however in colder regions, it is grown as an annual.
