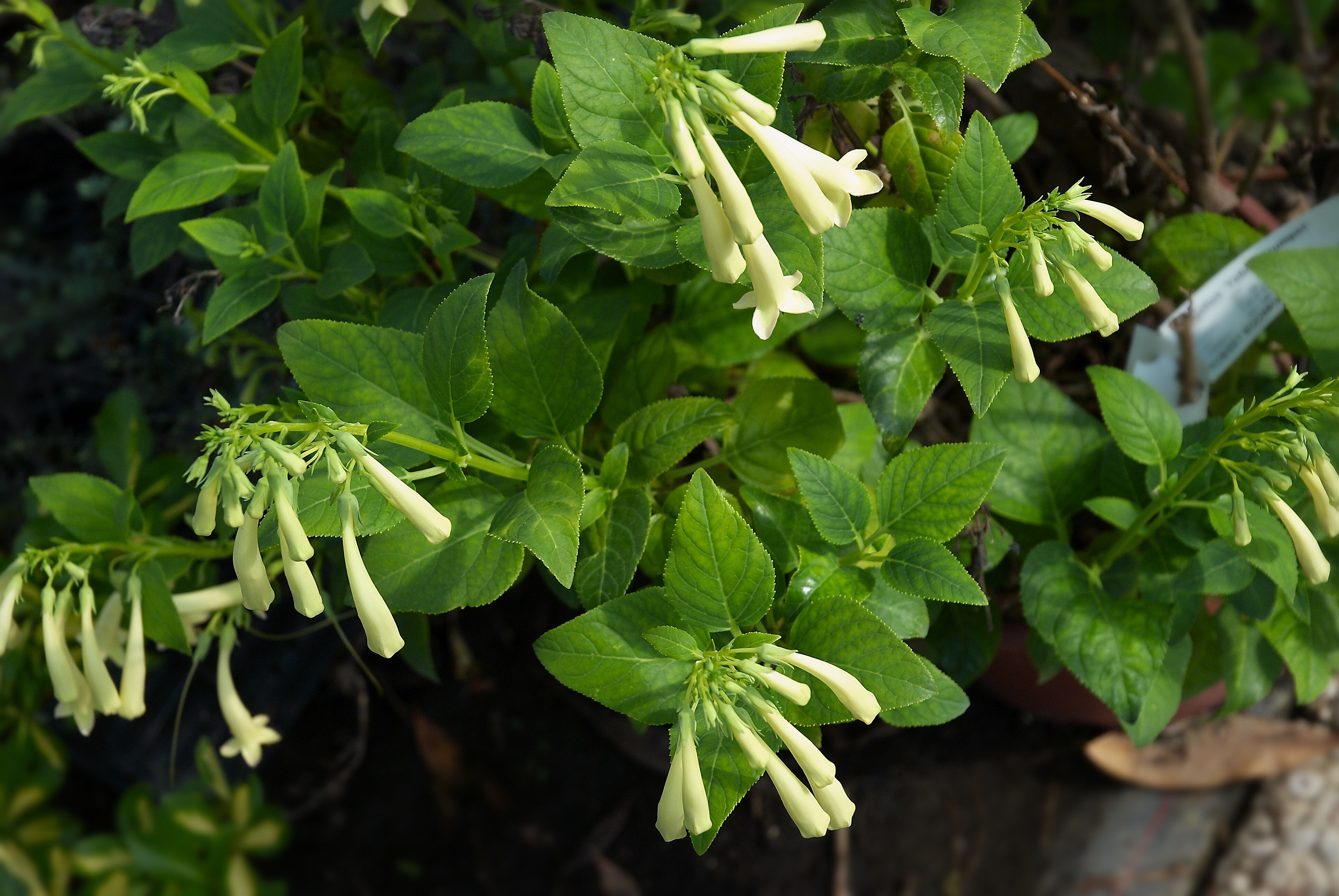
- 'Yellow Trumpet'

Scientific classification
- Kingdom: Plantae
- Clade: Tracheophytes
- Clade: Angiosperms
- Clade: Eudicots
- Clade: Asterids
- Order: Lamiales
- Family: Scrophulariaceae
- Genus: Phygelius
- Species: P. aequalis

Binomial name
- Phygelius aequalis Harv. ex Hiern (1904)

= Phygelius aequalis =

Species of shrub

Phygelius aequalis is a species of flowering plant in the family Scrophulariaceae, native to South Africa. It is a semi-evergreen shrub growing to 1 m (3 ft) tall and wide, with 25 cm (10 in) long panicles of pink flowers with crimson lobes and yellow throats. This species may be distinguished from the closely related Phygelius capensis by the fact that the flowers grow in a single plane along one side of the stem. The narrowly tubular flowers are up to 6 cm (2 in) in length.

The common names Cape fuchsia and Cape figwort attach to both P. aequalis and P. capensis, though they are not closely related to the true fuchsias, and "figwort" refers to several plants other than phygelius.

Phygelius aequalis is valued as a garden plant with a particularly long flowering season throughout summer. Though a shrub, in cooler areas it grows as a perennial. It requires some winter protection. The cultivars 'Trewidden Pink' and 'Yellow Trumpet' have gained the Royal Horticultural Society's Award of Garden Merit.
