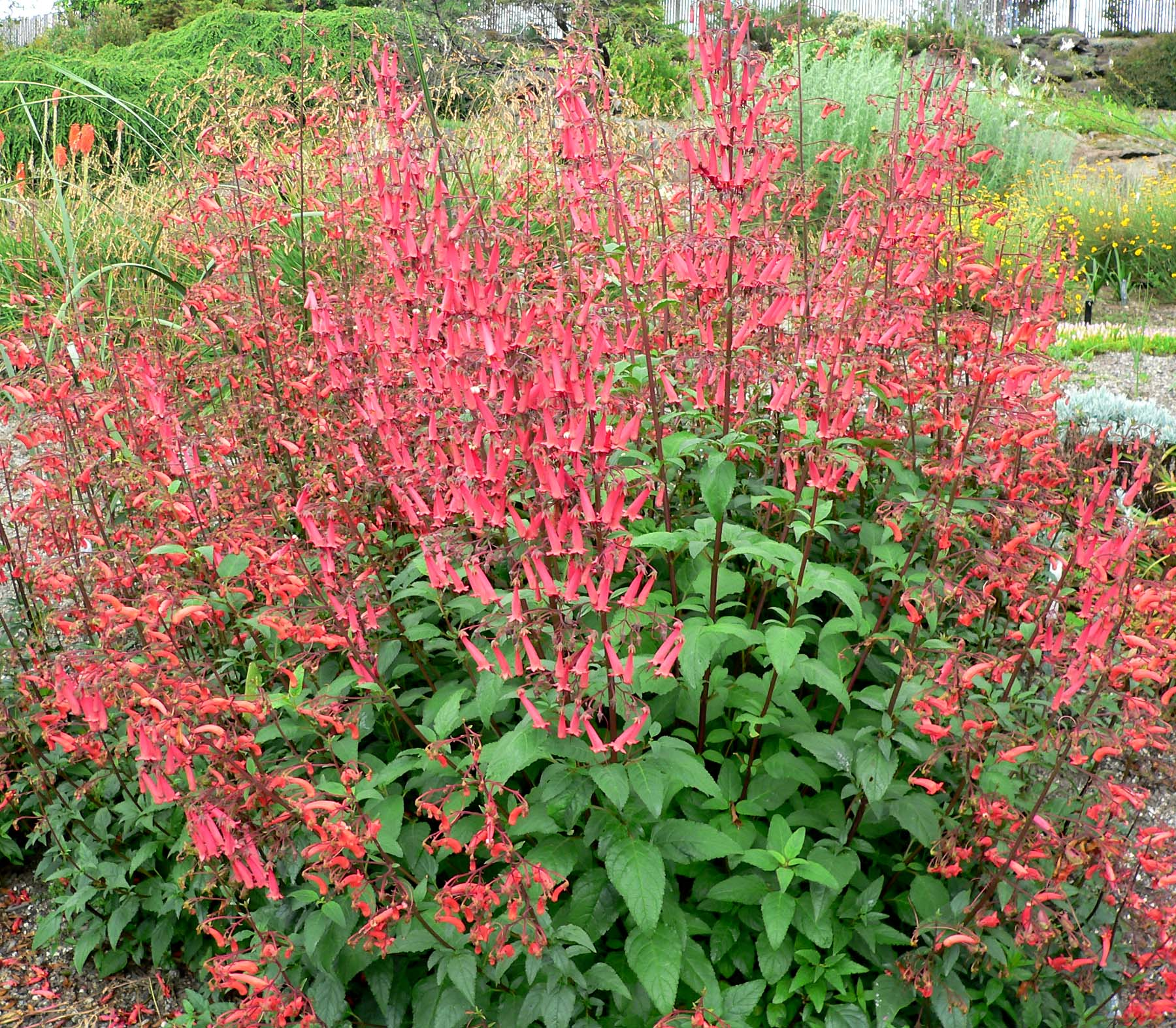
- Phygelius capensis

Scientific classification
- Kingdom: Plantae
- Clade: Tracheophytes
- Clade: Angiosperms
- Clade: Eudicots
- Clade: Asterids
- Order: Lamiales
- Family: Scrophulariaceae
- Genus: Phygelius; E. Mey. ex Benth.

= Phygelius =

Genus of shrubs

Phygelius, common names Cape fuchsia or Cape figwort, is a genus of flowering plants in the family Scrophulariaceae, native to wet slopes and banks in southern Africa. They are evergreen shrubs often treated as perennials in colder climates. They bear many pendent tubular flowers over a long period in summer, in shades of white, yellow and red. The vague similarity of the blooms to fuchsias has led to the common name Cape fuchsia, though they are not closely related.

== Species ==
There are currently two species in this genus.

- Phygelius capensis
- Phygelius aequalis

== Cultivars ==
Several cultivars are available for gardeners. Some are hybrids between the two known species. Development of the cultivars has taken place primarily in the United Kingdom in order to create varieties better fitted for the colder climate.

The following hybrid cultivars have gained the Royal Horticultural Society's Award of Garden Merit:-

- Phygelius × rectus 'African Queen'
- Phygelius × rectus 'Devil's Tears'
- Phygelius × rectus 'Salmon Leap'
