= California Redemption Value =

Fee on recyclable containers in California, U.S.

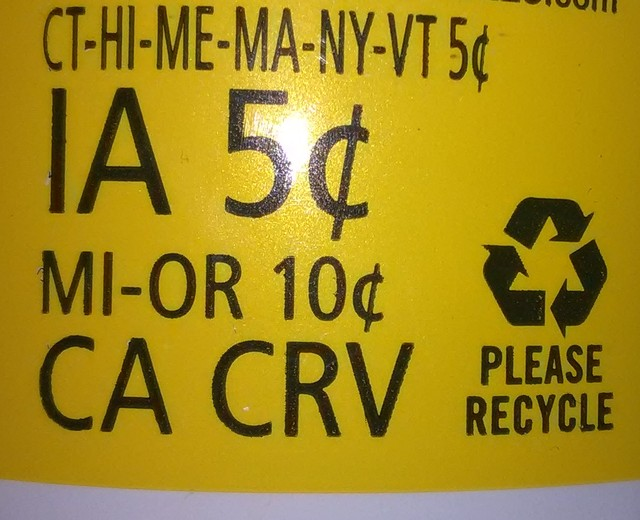
Bottle redemption value or deposit label on a soft drink

California Redemption Value (CRV), also known as California Refund Value, is a regulatory fee paid on recyclable beverage containers in the U.S. state of California. The fee was established by the California Beverage Container Recycling and Litter Reduction Act of 1986 (AB 2020, Margolin) and further extended to additional beverage types in California State Senate Bill No. 1013, signed into law on September 28, 2022, and taking effect on January 1, 2024. Since 2010 the program has been administered by the Cal/EPA California Department of Resources Recycling and Recovery (CalRecycle); it was previously administered by the California Department of Conservation, Division of Recycling.

Other states have similar bottle bills/deposit laws, including Connecticut, Hawaii, Iowa, Massachusetts, Maine, Michigan, New York, Oregon, and Vermont.

== Regulatory system ==
The bottler pays CRV for beverages with aluminum, plastic, glass, and bimetal containers and anyone can receive the same amount in exchange for the container by bringing it to a recycling center. The symbol on beverage containers eligible for reimbursement is "CA CRV". Currently, CRV is 5 cents for containers less than 24 US fluid ounces (710 ml) and 10 cents for containers 24 US fluid ounces (710 ml) or larger. Starting in 2024 wine boxes, pouches and bladders can be redeemed for 25 cents. The state also allows recyclers to pay by weight, for which the state also sets a separate minimum price per pound (kg). When redeeming in quantities up to 50 containers, the consumer has the right to be paid by count on request. In larger quantities, the recycler has discretion. Recyclers have the right to refuse or offer a reduced price for contaminated materials. It is illegal to bring in out-of-state cans or bottles to California to recoup the CRV and violators can be charged with fraud, a felony.

The charge for California Redemption Value is similar to bottle bill deposits used in other states, but is technically a fee imposed on the distributor of the beverage. The fee tends to be passed along to the retailer and to the consumer via normal market forces. Distributors and retailers usually break out the CRV as a distinct part of the purchase price in advertising and on receipts (for example the charge for a 50-cent bottle of soda may appear on the receipt as "45 cents plus 5 cents CRV").

One way the difference between CRV and a system in which the consumer pays a deposit or tax shows up is that sales tax applies to the CRV amount, if the item is subject to sales tax. If it were not part of the basic price of the product, sales tax would not apply to it. Accordingly, when the State of California raised the CRV from $0.04 on 2 L bottles and $0.02 on cans to $0.08 and $0.04, respectively, then again to $0.10 and $0.05, respectively, it was also raising California's sales tax revenue gained on the imposed fee.

=== Types of beverages ===
CRV is paid on the following types of beverages:

- Carbonated and noncarbonated water
- Carbonated and noncarbonated soft drinks, energy drinks, and sport drinks
- Coffee and tea drinks
- Beer and other malt beverages
- Wine
- Distilled spirits
- Distilled spirits coolers
- 100% fruit juice and 100% vegetable juice

CRV is not paid on the following:

- Milk, white or flavored
- Medical food
- Infant formula
- Products not in liquid or "ready to drink" form
- Products not intended for human consumption
- Containers not made of glass, metal, or plastic

== Recycling centers ==
In August 2019, California's largest recycling redemption and processing centers operator, RePlanet, announced closing all 284 of its remaining centers, ceasing operations, terminating 750 employees, and beginning the process of liquidating assets to pay creditors, because of continued reduction in State fees, the depressed pricing of recycled aluminum and PET plastic, minimum wage increases, and the rise in operating costs. In February 2016, RePlanet had closed 191 recycling centers and terminated nearly 300 employees in smaller communities across California, due to the same causes.

=== Issues with implementation ===
Fresno State had trash bins along with dedicated beverage containers recycling receptacles. Despite their best effort to secure them against theft including keeping them under lock and key, they were forced to remove the beverage receptacles as "vagrants would break the locks and steal the contents", according to Fresno State's manager for office of environmental health safety, risk management and sustainability.

=== Declining value of materials from recyclable containers ===
The falling market value of materials that redeemable containers are made of such as metal, plastic or glass has led to a decrease in the viability of many local recycling centers. CalRecycle, the agency that oversees the CRV program, reported in 2016 that recycling rates had declined below their goal of 80%. It is estimated that around 1.7 million containers were not recycled as a result of the decline over the past five years, ending up in dumps instead. Barriers to the ease of recycling has effectively caused consumers to lose, as the LA Times reported, "at least $308 million in 5-cent deposits on cans and bottles in 2018". The incentive to process the containers has decreased in monetary amount along with inflation further devaluing the incentive. A later bill, The California beverage container recycling law, attempted to solve the initial shortcomings by requiring that when not within half of a mile from a recycling center, that the markets themselves must accept CRV qualified containers or be fined a daily rate. This has not completely solved the issue as many companies choose not to accept recycles but do not pay the fine, similar to the litigation between the state of California and CVS as recent as December 2019.

== See also ==
- Container deposit legislation in the United States
