= Dedicated outdoor air system =

Type of heating, ventilation and air-conditioning system

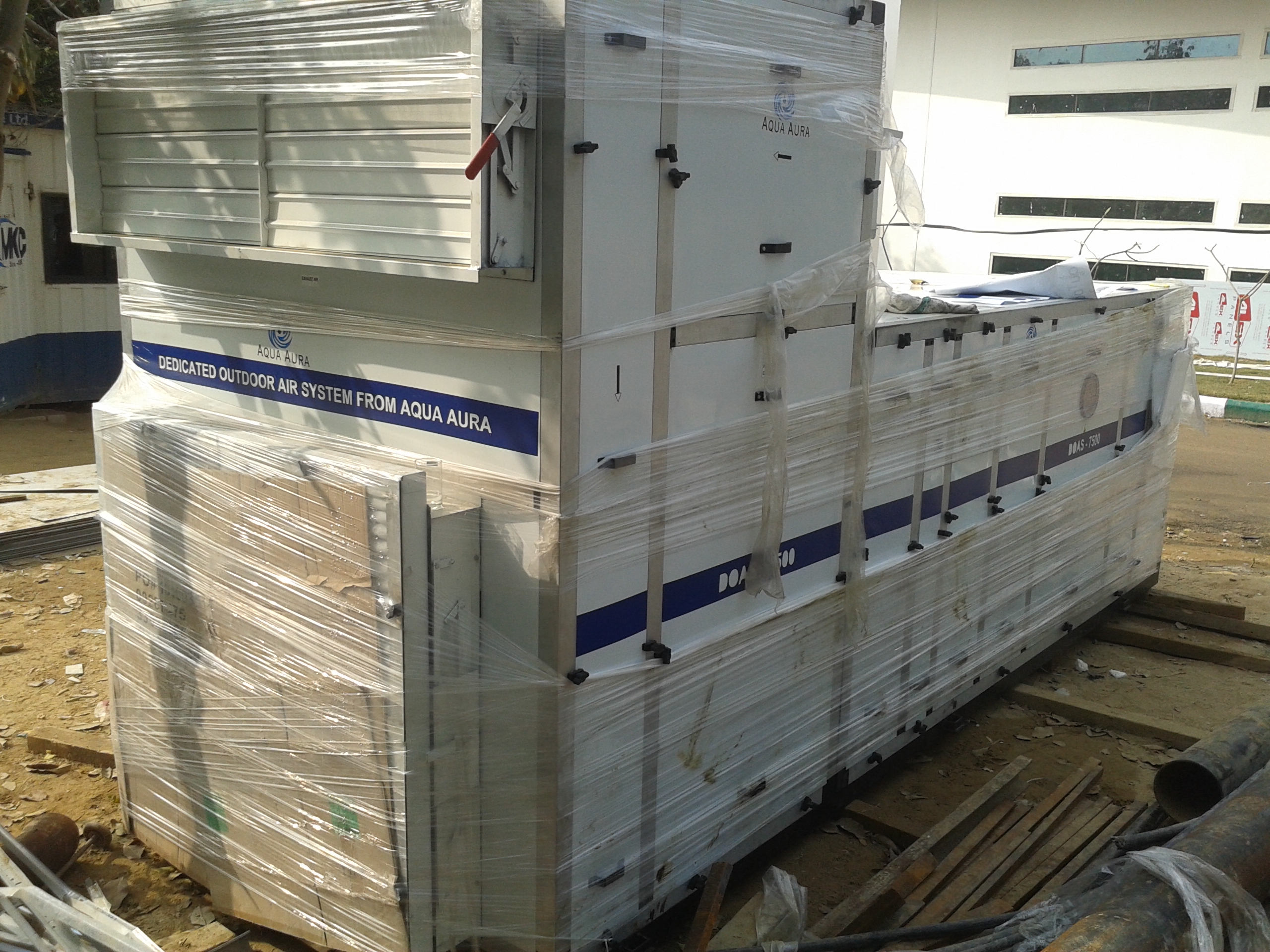
DOAS air handling unit with heat recovery wheel and passive dehumidification

A dedicated outdoor air system (DOAS) is a type of heating, ventilation and air-conditioning (HVAC) system that consists of two parallel systems: a dedicated system for delivering outdoor air ventilation that handles both the latent and sensible loads of conditioning the ventilation air, and a parallel system to handle the (mostly sensible heat) loads generated by indoor/process sources and those that pass through the building enclosure.

== Background ==
Traditional HVAC systems, such as variable air volume (VAV) systems serving multiple zones, have potential problems in terms of poor thermal comfort, possible microbial contamination, and carbon dioxide in home cannot be expelled. Depending on the environment and the parallel system involved, in a DOAS setup the outdoor air system will handle some of the sensible load in addition to the latent load, and the parallel system will handle the remaining sensible load. The main point of a DOAS system is to provide dedicated ventilation rather than ventilation as an incidental part of the process of conditioning interior air. DOAS is a term given to a system that has been used extensively in Europe and in various forms in the US.

== System overview ==
William Coad proposed in 1999 to handle the OA (outdoor air) and return air separately in building HVAC systems. Gatley also describes the application of DOAS for delivering dehumidified air to buildings to improve the indoor air quality and thermal comfort. More recent research efforts have been conducted to study the basics of DOAS with emphasis on the potential advantages compared to the conventional HVAC systems. S.A. Mumma suggests that there are four main problems with conventional all air overhead mixing VAV HVAC systems. These issues of VAV systems highlight the corresponding advantages of DOAS systems. However, some disadvantages of DOAS include: potentially higher first costs, lack of use in the United States, and potentially higher complexity.

- Ventilation air in all air VAV HVAC systems: Designers and building engineers are unable to know exactly how the ventilation air that is mixed with the return air in a typical VAV system is distributed throughout the building. Issues such as air leakage, control set points, minimum air volume settings, and short-circuiting (e.g. exhaust air mixing with intake fresh air) can all affect the amount of ventilation air that reaches a space. A DOAS system solves this problem by providing a dedicated supply of 100% outdoor air.
- Need for excess outdoor air flow and conditioning in VAV systems: When the multiple spaces equation of ASHRAE Standard 62.1-2004 is used, generally from 20 to 70% more outdoor air is required in an effort to assure proper room air distribution in all air systems than is required with a dedicated outdoor air systems. Cooling and dehumidifying the high outdoor air quantities in the summer and humidifying and heating the air in the winter is an energy intensive proposition. The DOAS system is sized to meet the requirements, and does not require oversizing.
- VAV box minimums have to be set high to account for ventilation requirements: perhaps contrary to current practice, VAV box minimums must reflect both the ventilation requirements of the space and the fraction of ventilation air in the supply air. For example, a space requiring 5663 standard litre per minute (SLPM) (200 standard cubic feet per minute (SCFM)) of ventilation air and served with supply air that is 40% ventilation air, will require a box minimum setting of 14158 SLPM (500 SCFM) (i.e. 200/0.4) rather than the conventional practice of 5663 SLPM (200 SCFM). When the box minimums are properly set to satisfy the ventilation requirements, the potential for considerable terminal reheat becomes an issue. Therefore, properly operating all air VAV systems will always use more terminal reheat than dedicated outdoor air systems supplying air at the same temperature.
- No decoupling of latent and sensible space loads: The inability to decouple the space sensible and latent loads leads to high space relative humidity at low sensible loads in the occupied spaces. Properly designed dedicated outdoor air systems can accommodate 100% of the space latent loads and a portion of the space sensible loads, thus decoupling the space sensible and latent loads. A parallel sensible-only cooling system is then used to accommodate the sensible loads not met by the dedicated outdoor air systems. There is therefore a strong incentive to control the space latent loads independently of the space sensible loads to avoid moisture related Indoor air quality problems.

== Parallel terminal systems ==
For a typical DOAS ventilation system, the outside air system can accommodate around 0-30% of the space sensible load. In order to create a comfortable indoor environment, the balance of the space sensible loads must be accommodated by many other optional equipment choices as follows:

- Radiant ceiling panels
- A parallel all air variable-air-volume (VAV) systems
- Packaged unitary water source heat pumps
- Variable Refrigerant Flow (VRF) systems
- Fan coil units

=== Radiant system ===
Compared to other sensible cooling systems, radiant ceiling cooling panels are the best parallel system choice for use with the DOAS. Because the DOAS only accommodates the space ventilation and latent loads, it provides an opportunity to reduce the required floor-to-floor height by reducing the size of the duct system and the required fan power. There are numerous advantages of a radiant ceiling cooling system coupled with a DOAS. The general evaluation section in 2008 ASHRAE Handbook gives a brief description as follows:

The main advantages are:

- Because radiant loads are treated directly and air motion in the space is at normal ventilation levels, comfort levels can be better than those of other air-conditioning systems
- Meet the requirement of supply quantities for ventilation and dehumidification
- Due to the reduced outdoor air quantities, the DOAS system can be installed with smaller duct system
- Radiant ceiling cooling panels can eliminate wet surface cooling coils and reduce the potential for septic contamination
- The automatic sprinkler system piping can be applied into radiant ceiling cooling panel systems

The main disadvantage is related to higher initial costs.

Besides the advantages presented above, parallel radiant cooling panels offer other advantages as well, such as compact design, vertical shaft space area savings, and quick accommodation of dynamic controls. Energy savings in DOAS/radiant ceiling cooling panel system can by linked to: cooling coil load reduction, chiller energy reduction, pumping energy consumption and fan energy consumption reduction. In general, due to the total energy recovery and small supply air quantity of DOAS, the chiller energy consumption can be reduced significantly compared to the conventional VAV system. In a study of a pilot DOAS/radiant ceiling cooling panel system, hourly energy simulation predicts that the annual electrical energy consumption of the pilot DOAS/radiant panel cooling system is 42% less than that of the conventional VAV system with economizer control.

=== Air-based system ===
There are two main ways to design a DOAS when using an air-based system as the parallel system:

==== Separate systems with different ductwork ====
In this setup, there is an outdoor air system that dumps preconditioned air (accounting for latent load and partial sensible load) directly into the space in its own duct/diffuser. There is a separate system (e.g. fan coil unit) that takes air from the space and conditions it to meet the remaining space sensible load.

Advantages:

- Easier to measure the outdoor air flow rate into the space
- Easier to measure airflows and balance system
- Avoids imposing ventilation loads on space HVAC equipment (Fan coil unit)

Disadvantages:

- Separate ductwork for parallel paths can increase first costs
- Separate diffusers for outdoor air and recirculated air may not provide adequate mixing
- Separate parallel paths for airflow increases overall airflow to the space which can increase overall fan energy consumption

==== Combined system ====
Conditioned outdoor air is ducted to the terminal unit in the space. In this setup, the preconditioned outdoor air is ducted into the fan coil units directly, mixing with the return air from the space. This system is similar to a chilled beam setup.

Advantages:

- Combined ductwork leads to lower initial costs
- Combined airflow reduces air volume and consequently fan energy use
- Thorough mixing of outdoor air and return air from space

Disadvantages:

- Local terminal unit must operate whenever ventilation is required, regardless whether or not the sensible load has been met
- Balancing airflow may be more difficult

== Equipment ==
With the increasing application of DOAS in many countries, there is also increasing demand for DOAS equipment, such as a total energy wheel that uses total energy recovery, a passive dehumidifier wheel, and other relevant equipment. The effectiveness of the total energy wheel is an important factor for improving the efficiency of DOAS.

== Design ==
The requirements in the design of a DOAS include:

- Separating the OA system from the thermal control system to ensure proper ventilation in all occupied spaces
- Conditioning the OA to handle all the space latent load and as much of the space sensible load as possible
- Maximizing the cost-effective use of energy recovery equipment
- Integrating fire suppression and energy transport systems
- Using ceiling radiant sensible cooling panels for occupant thermal control

Mumma proposed the following steps for designing the DOAS:

- Calculating the space sensible and latent cooling loads on the summer design day based on the design conditions for the space
- Determining the minimum air flow rate that each space requires based on the ASHRAE Standard 62.1 ventilation guidelines
- Determining the supply air humidity ratio for each space
- Typically, the design supply air dry bulb temperature will equal the required supply air dew point temperature)
- Using energy recovery to move exhaust air heat back to the DOAS unit (during heating seasons)

For DOAS with air-based system as parallel cooling system, the following steps were proposed: 1) calculating the sensible cooling load met by the DOAS supply air for each space; 2) calculating the sensible cooling load remaining on the parallel system for each space; 3) determining the supply air dry bulb temperature for parallel systems (above the space dew point temperature to avoid condensation); 4) determining the supply air flow rate for each parallel sensible cooling device.

== Energy and cost ==
Many studies have been conducted to demonstrate the energy and cost performance of DOAS in terms of simulations. Khattar and Brandemuehl simulated the parallel system and a conventional single system for a large retail store in Dallas, St. Louis, Washington DC, and New Orleans. The study demonstrated annual energy savings of 14% to 27% and 15% to 23% smaller equipment capacity for the parallel cooling system. Jeong et al. compared the energy and cost performance of a DOAS with parallel ceiling radiant panels to a conventional VAV system with air-side economizer for a nearly 3,000 square feet (280 m^{2}) office space in an educational building in Pennsylvania. A 42% reduction of the annual energy usage for the DOAS system with substantial savings in both fan and chiller energy use was reported in this study. Emmerich and McDowell evaluated the potential energy savings of DOAS in U.S. commercial buildings. The building model was developed to be consistent with typical new construction and meet the ASHRAE Standard 90.1 (ASHRAE 90.1) requirements. The simulation results indicated that the full DOAS resulted in the annual HVAC energy cost savings ranging from 21% to 38%.

== See also ==
- Heat recovery ventilation
