= Capillary tube mat =

Flat composite structure of thin tubes

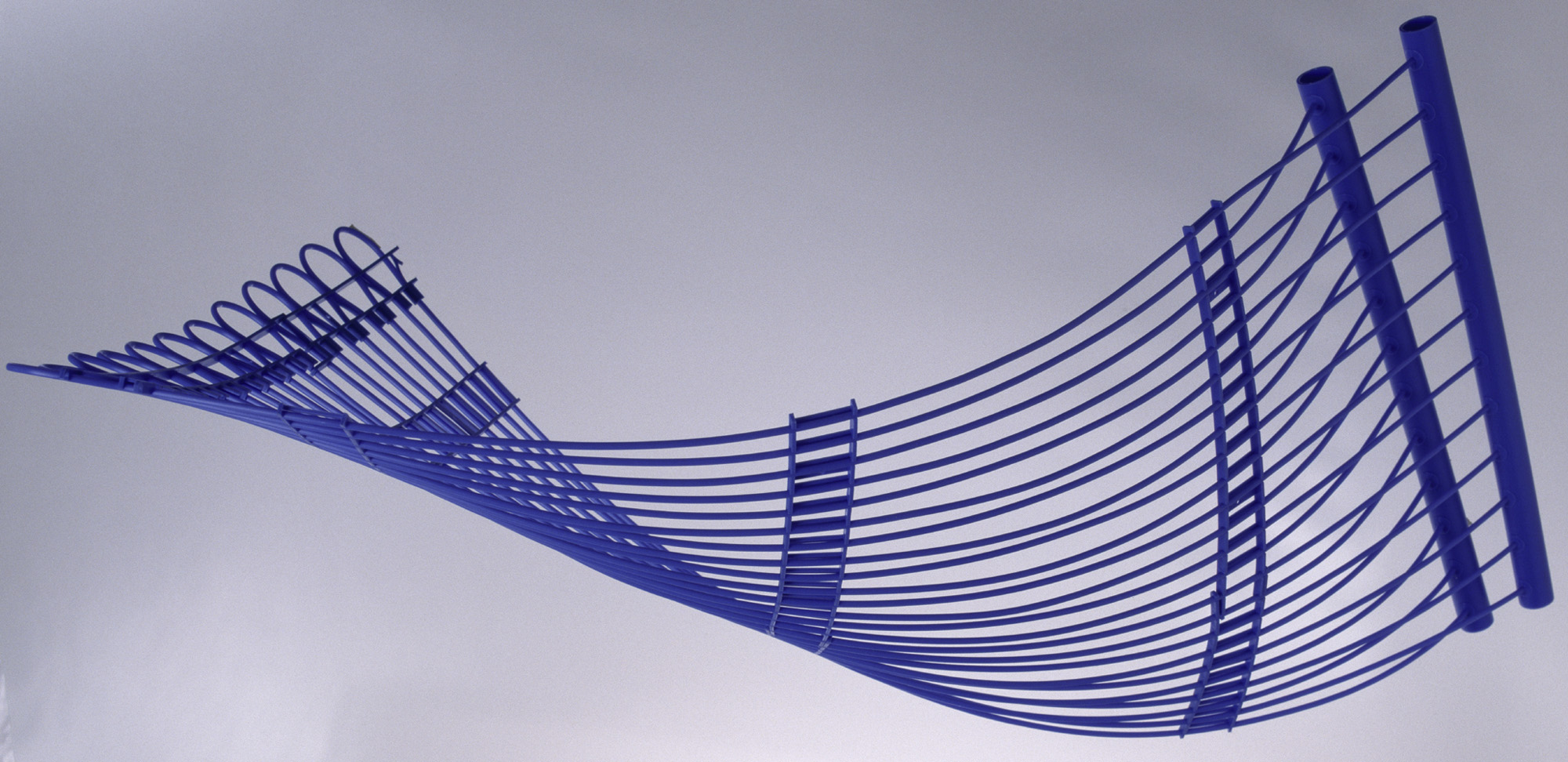
capillary tube mat

A capillary tube mat is a flat composite structure of thin tubes (capillaries) with a distributor tube and a collector tube. The main applications include cooling ceilings (radiant cooling) and underfloor heating.

== Technology ==
=== Idea ===
The construction of the capillary tube mat models the networks of fine veins created by nature, which run under the skin (surface) of living creatures, and supply the organism with nutrients and also help heat regulation of the body. Capillary tube mats lay close beneath the surface in areas of rooms, and transport warm or cool water through them in order to control the temperature of the rooms. Since fluid always flows in parallel through many capillaries, similar to the veins under the skin of the body, the heat exchange with the environment is intense and energetically effective.

A room whose temperature is controlled by the use of capillary tube mats as a surface heat-exchanger requires flow temperatures for heating or cooling which need only be a few degrees away from the desired room temperature. At the same time, due to the large number of parallel capillary tubes, the drive energy required to maintain the flow is comparatively low. Due to the small distance of the capillary tubes to the surface of the room area, the system reacts very quickly. The temperature of the heating or cooling medium is given off very evenly and quickly to the environment due to the large number of capillary tubes. These two properties – very good heat transmission and low pressure loss – provide an advantage in terms of energy saving. In the broad definition of the terms of the technology, the capillary tube mat is a surface heat exchanger, and can be used for the transfer of heat between two media.

=== Features ===
The typical capillary tube mat has capillary tubes with an external diameter of less than 5 mm. This makes the construction very flexible, and emphasizes the property of the "mat". The individual capillary tubes are arranged in a grid with a spacing of 10 to max. 50 mm from each other.

Capillary tube mats are usually made of plastic, such as polypropylene, which is frequently used in building for pipelines and in ventilation and air-conditioning equipment. This material and the small dimensions create the flexibility of the grid, and therefore the properties of the mat. The use of plastic in the manufacture of capillary tube mats, instead of copper or steel as in other cooling ceiling pipes, significantly reduces the costs. Since the capillary tubes are very thin-walled, the lower heat conductivity of the plastic compared to metals has no adverse effect on the heat transmission. Polypropylene is highly resistant to many chemicals (DIN 8078) and therefore very durable. Polypropylene is also very easy to recycle. Polypropylene is open to oxygen diffusion. This property requires that the capillary tube mats are always operated only in corrosion-protected pipe systems. This measure ensures the reliable function of the systems, and offers adequate protection against corrosion damage (corrosion and corrosion protection).

Capillary tube mats are produced by means of standard plastic-processing techniques such as extrusion, thermal plastic welding, and injection molding.

== History ==
The invention of capillary tube mats goes back to the year 1981, when the Berlin engineer Dipl.-Ing. Donald Herbst applied for his first patent for this technology (DE 31 24 048, registration date 15.06.1981, "Piping network for warm water surface heating of floors or walls"). During his many years of work on capillary tube mat technology, this was followed by a number of supplementary additional inventions/patents, which contributed to the continual further development of the manufacturing processes and applications of capillary tube mats. In the early years, the capillary tube mats were marketed under the brand "KaRo" (acronym of the German word "KapillarRohr" meaning capillary tube).

On the occasion of the 1984 International Building Exhibition in Berlin, the prize went to the draft of an energy-saving house produced by the architects of "Gerkan, Marg und Partner". Here capillary tube mats were used for the first time in a complex system in a residential building with a floor area of 1,200 m^{2}.

Extensive scientific work by Prof. Dr. Mathias Fraaß (since 1991) and later by Prof. Dr. Bernd Glück (since 1994) created the necessary basic principles on the theory in the applications for capillary tube mats. Today capillary tube mats are installed worldwide. The annual production quantity is estimated at over 400,000 m^{2} (2010).

== Importance and application ==
Capillary tube mats are used primarily in radiant cooling. Every type of cooling ceiling can be activated by capillary tube mats. In addition to plaster cooling ceilings with capillary tube mats, which require a plaster layer of less than 15 mm, capillary tube mats are also installed in metal cassette ceilings and in suspended plasterboard ceilings. The transmitted cooling performances for the different versions, at a temperature difference of 10 K between the average media temperature and the room temperature, lie between 65 and 90 W/m^{2}. Capillary tube mats hanging freely in the room achieve cooling performances significantly in excess of 100 W/m^{2}.

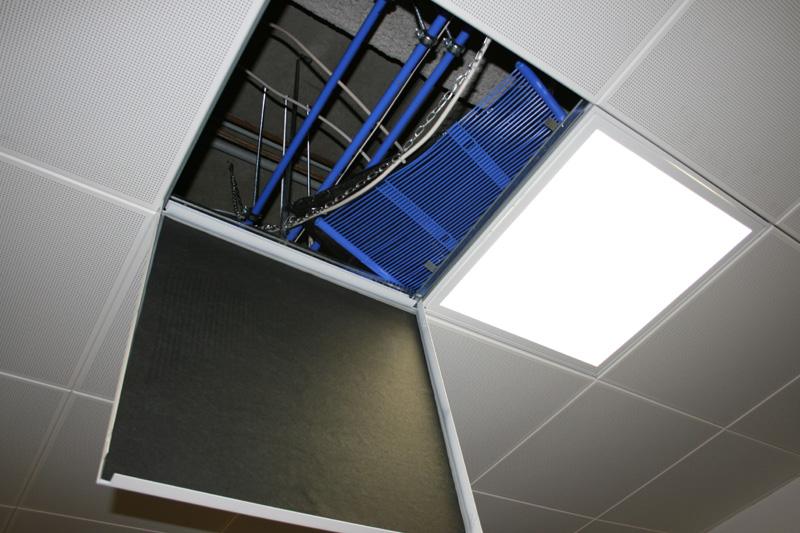
metal cassette ceiling with capillary tube mats as cooling ceiling

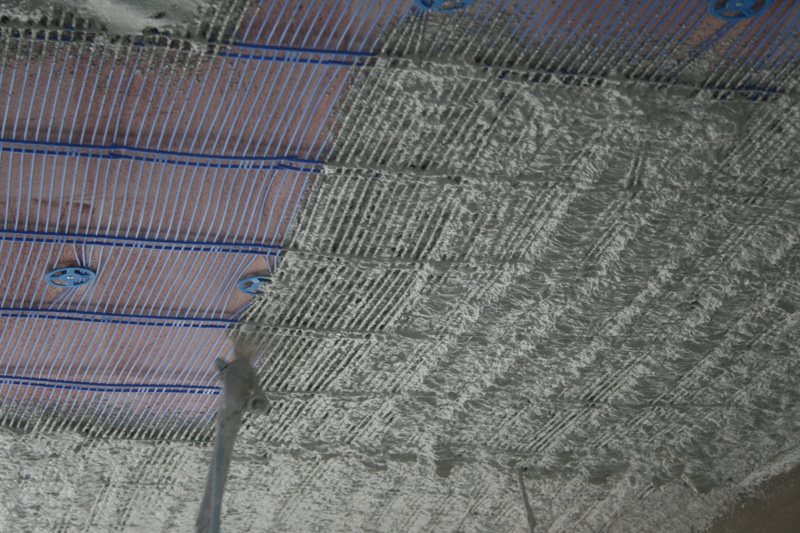
plaster cooling ceiling with capillary tube mats

Capillary tube mats are also used for thermal building component activation. In contrast to conventional concrete core activation, the capillary tubes used in thermal building component activation lie about 5 mm close under the ceiling surface. This arrangement ensures a fast reaction and a high transmission performance of up to 90 W/m^{2} (at 10 K temperature difference, see above), and also uses the concrete mass as a thermal accumulator. Capillary tube mats can be used for the construction of very thinly built-up heating surfaces as underfloor or wall heating. A layer thickness of less than 15 mm is quite feasible. Capillary tube mats are also used as compact collectors for the exploitation of geothermal energy in heat pump plants. The extractor surface can be reduced in size through the use of capillary tube mats. In the processing and manufacturing industry, capillary tube mats are already in use for the temperature control of things such as acid baths.

=== Large-scale projects ===
- Olympic Village Vancouver, Canada
- Twin Towers Vienna, Austria
- Uniqa Tower Vienna, Austria
- Allianz Treptower Berlin, Germany
- Hôpital de Lagny, Marne la Vallée, France
- Jin Mao Palace, Beijing, China
