= Radiant heating and cooling =

Category of HVAC technologies

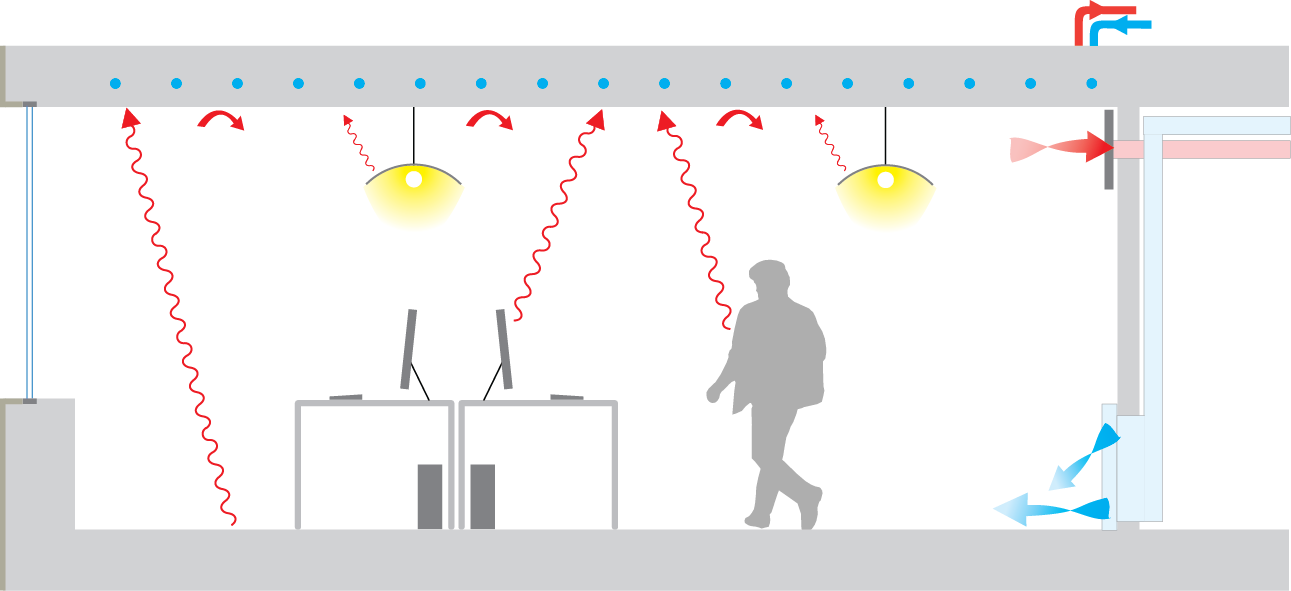
Section view of room with internally cooled and heated concrete slab ceiling

Radiant heating and cooling is a category of HVAC technologies that exchange heat by both convection and radiation with the environments they are designed to heat or cool. There are many subcategories of radiant heating and cooling, including: "radiant ceiling panels", "embedded surface systems", "thermally active building systems", and infrared heaters. According to some definitions, a technology is only included in this category if radiation comprises more than 50% of its heat exchange with the environment; therefore technologies such as radiators and chilled beams (which may also involve radiation heat transfer) are usually not considered radiant heating or cooling. Within this category, it is practical to distinguish between high temperature radiant heating (devices with emitting source temperature >≈300 °F), and radiant heating or cooling with more moderate source temperatures. This article mainly addresses radiant heating and cooling with moderate source temperatures, used to heat or cool indoor environments. Moderate temperature radiant heating and cooling is usually composed of relatively large surfaces that are internally heated or cooled using hydronic or electrical sources. For high temperature indoor or outdoor radiant heating, see: Infrared heater. For snow melt applications see: Snowmelt system.

== History ==
Radiant heating and cooling originated as separate systems but now share a similar form. Radiant heating has a long history in Asia and Europe. The earliest systems, from as early as 5000 BC, were found in northern China and Korea. Archaeological findings show kang and dikang, heated beds and floors in ancient Chinese homes. Kang originated in the 11th century BC as “to dry” later evolving into a heated bed, while dikang expanded this concept to a heated floor. In Korea, the ondol system, meaning "warm stone," used flues beneath the floor to channel smoke from a kitchen stove, heating flat stones that radiated heat into the room above. Over time, the ondol system adapted to use coal and later transitioned to water-based systems in the 20th century, remaining a common heating system in Korean buildings.

In Europe, the Roman hypocaust system, developed around the 3rd century BC, was an early radiant heating method using a furnace connected to underfloor and wall flues to circulate hot air in public baths and villas. This technology spread across the Roman Empire but declined after its fall, replaced by simpler fireplaces in the Middle Ages. In this period, systems like the Kachelofen from Austria and Germany used thermal masses for efficient heat storage and distribution. During the 18th century, radiant heating gained renewed use in Europe, driven by advancements in thermal storage techniques, such as heated flues for efficient heat distribution and a better understanding of how materials retain and transfer heat. In the early 19th century, developments in water-based systems with embedded hot water pipes paved the way for modern radiant heating, providing indoor comfort through heat transfer.

Radiant cooling also has ancient roots. In the 8th century, Mesopotamian builders used snow-packed walls to cool indoor space. The concept resurfaced in the 20th century with hydronic cooling systems in Europe, embedding cool water pipes in structures to absorb and dissipate heat, meeting cooling loads. Radiant cooling became more widely adopted in the 1990s, with the implementation of floor cooling. Today, modern radiant systems typically use water as a thermal medium for efficient heat transfer and are widely adopted in residential, commercial, and industrial buildings. While valued for its potential to enhance energy efficiency, quiet operation, and thermal comfort, their performance varies with design and application, leading to ongoing discussions.

== Radiant Heating ==
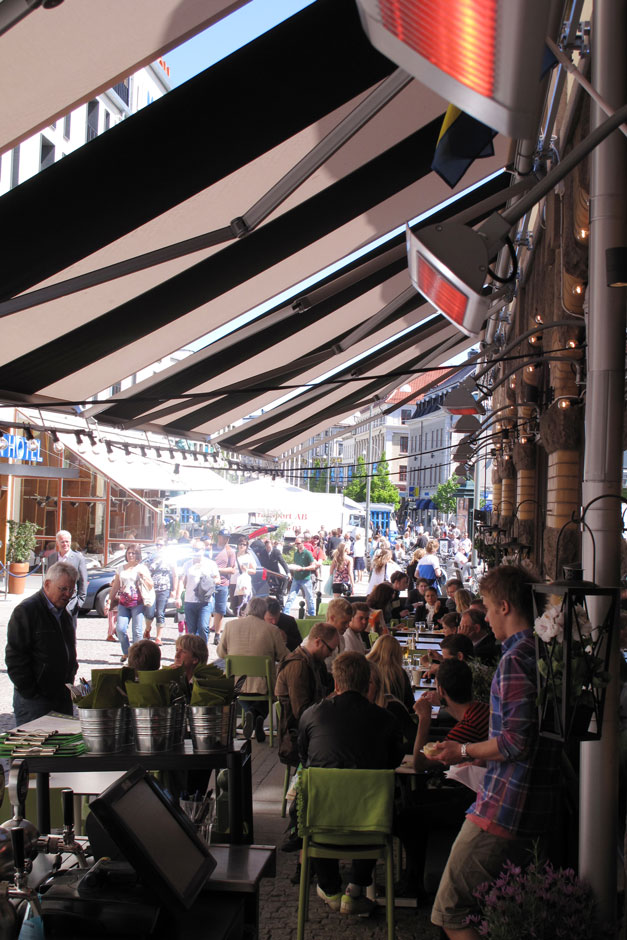
Electric Infrared Halogen Heaters

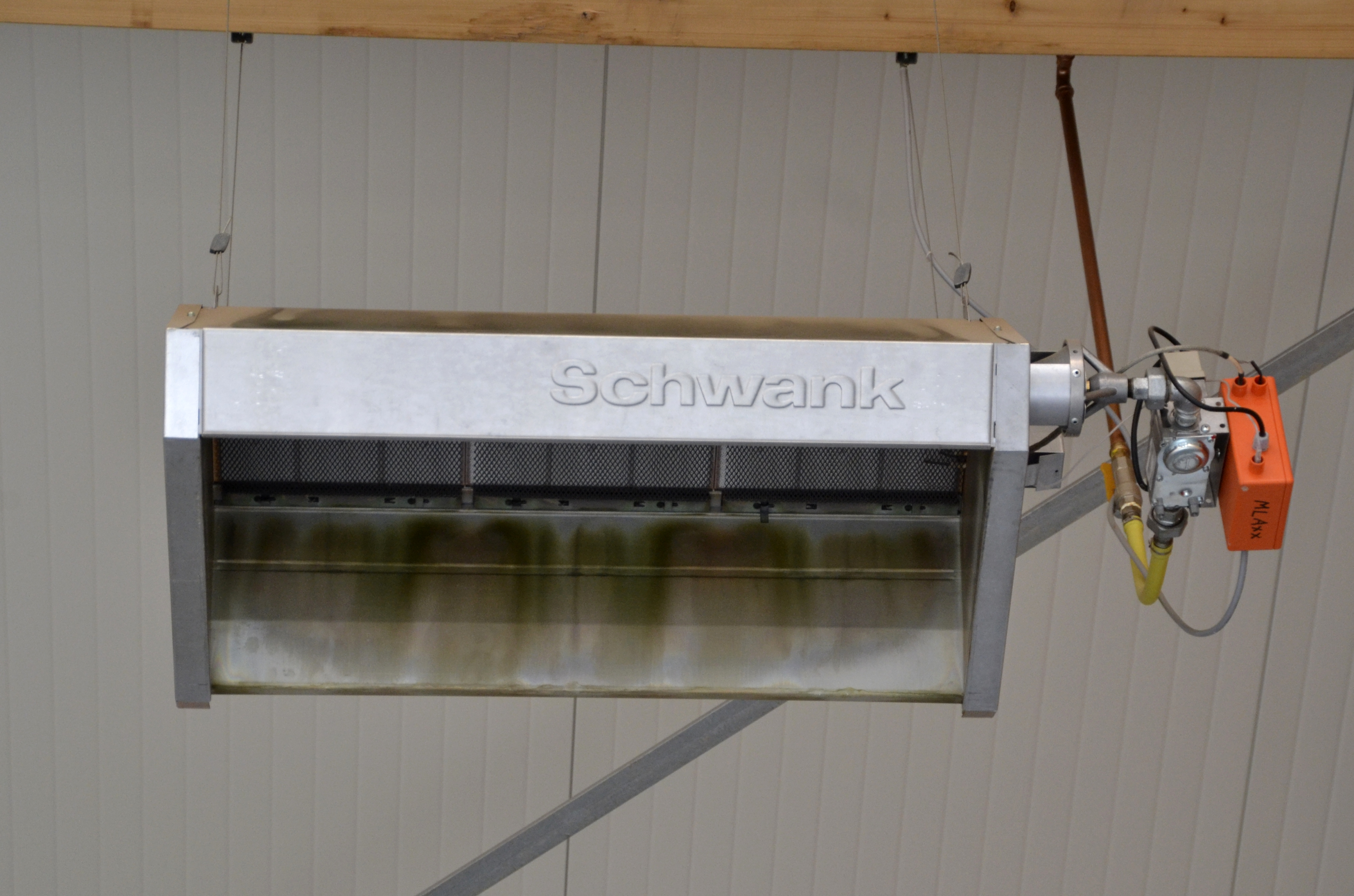
Gas-Fired High Intensity Heater

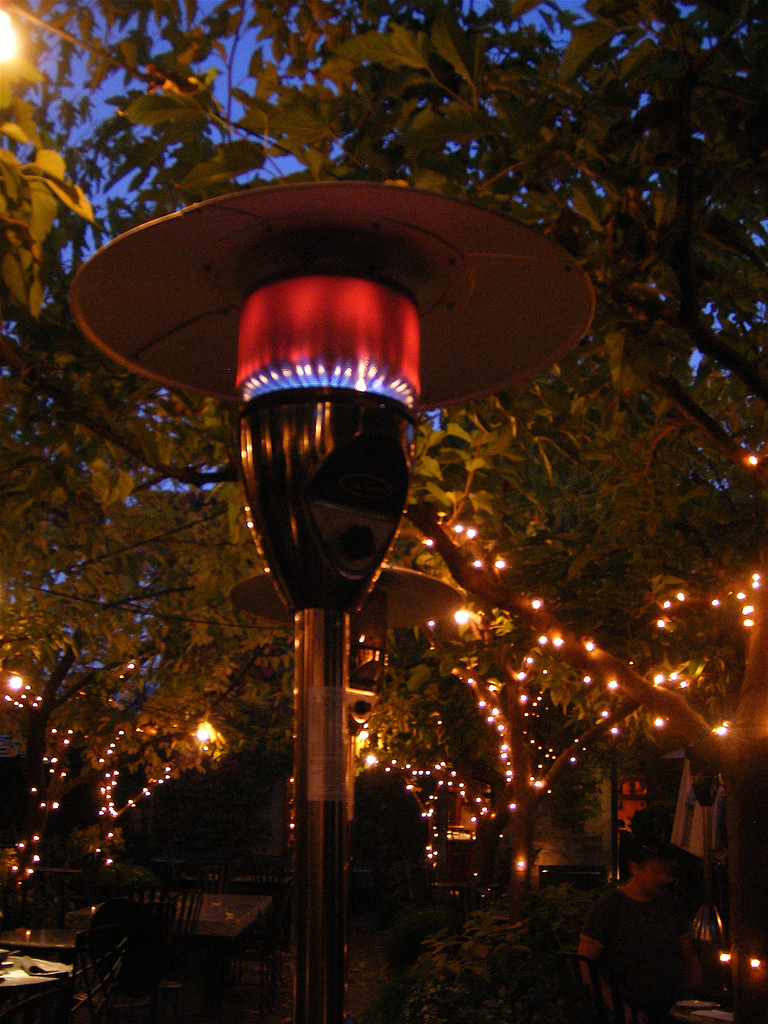
Gas burning patio heater

Radiant heating is a technology for heating indoor and outdoor areas. Heating by radiant energy is observed every day, the warmth of the sunshine being the most commonly observed example. Radiant heating as a technology is more narrowly defined. It is the method of intentionally using the principles of radiant heat to transfer radiant energy from an emitting heat source to an object. Designs with radiant heating are seen as replacements for conventional convection heating as well as a way of supplying confined outdoor heating.

=== Indoor ===
The heat energy is emitted from large warm elements, such as a floor, wall or overhead panel, or smaller hot elements, and warms people and other objects in rooms rather than directly heating the air. The internal air temperature for radiant heated buildings may be lower than for a conventionally heated building to achieve the same level of body comfort, when adjusted so the perceived temperature is actually the same. One of the key advantages of radiant heating systems is a much decreased circulation of air inside the room and the corresponding spreading of airborne particles.

Radiant heating systems can be divided into:

- Underfloor heating systems—electric or hydronic
- Wall or ceiling panels
- Higher temperature devices such as electric fireplaces or infrared heaters

Underfloor and wall heating systems often are called low-temperature systems. Since their heating surface is much larger than other systems, a much lower temperature is required to achieve the same level of heat transfer, making hydronic ones ideal for use with heat pumps. The maximum temperature of the heating surface can vary from 29–35 °C (84–95 °F) depending on the room type. Radiant overhead panels are mostly used in production and warehousing facilities or sports centers; they hang a few meters above the floor and their surface temperatures are higher. Medium-size, medium-temperature electric panels are also available for mounting on domestic walls or ceilings.

Fireplaces or heaters powered by solid, liquid or gaseous fuels, or electricity, generally glow bright red to yellow. This also applies to portable devices, although some such as catalytic heaters may glow with a dull red not easily seen. Single installations or devices heat persons and animals mainly one-sidedly but to a smaller extent also opposing surfaces.

All of these systems may provide a room climate with less circulation, lower air temperature and higher humidity levels than with air heating systems. This saves energy especially with short-term use and in some cases can be healthier.

=== Outdoors ===
In the case of heating outdoor areas, the surrounding air is constantly moving. Relying on convection heating is in most cases impractical, the reason being that, once you heat the outside air, it will blow away with air movement. Even in a no-wind condition, the buoyancy effects will carry away the hot air. Outdoor radiant heaters allow specific spaces within an outdoor area to be targeted, warming only the people and objects in their path. Radiant heating systems may be gas-fired or use electric infrared heating elements. An example of the overhead radiant heaters are the patio heaters often used with outdoor serving. The top metal disc reflects the radiant heat onto a small area.

== Radiant cooling ==
Radiant cooling is the use of cooled surfaces to remove sensible heat primarily by thermal radiation and only secondarily by other methods like convection. Radiant systems that use water to cool the radiant surfaces are examples of hydronic systems. Unlike “all-air” air conditioning systems that circulate cooled air only, hydronic radiant systems circulate cooled water in pipes through specially-mounted panels on a building's floor or ceiling to provide comfortable temperatures. There is a separate system to provide air for ventilation, dehumidification, and potentially additionally cooling. Radiant systems are less common than all-air systems for cooling, but can have advantages compared to all-air systems in some applications.

Since the majority of the cooling process results from removing sensible heat through radiant exchange with people and objects and not air, occupant thermal comfort can be achieved with warmer interior air temperatures than with air based cooling systems. Radiant cooling systems potentially offer reductions in cooling energy consumption. The latent loads (humidity) from occupants, infiltration and processes generally need to be managed by an independent system. Radiant cooling may also be integrated with other energy-efficient strategies such as night time flushing, indirect evaporative cooling, or ground source heat pumps as it requires a small difference in temperature between desired indoor air temperature and the cooled surface.

Passive daytime radiative cooling uses a material that fluoresces in the infrared atmospheric window, a frequency range where the atmosphere is unusually transparent, so that the energy goes straight out to space. This can cool the heat-fluorescent object to below ambient air temperature, even in full sun.

=== Advantages ===
Radiant cooling systems offer lower energy consumption than conventional cooling systems based on research conducted by the Lawrence Berkeley National Laboratory. Radiant cooling energy savings depend on the climate, but on average across the US savings are in the range of 30% compared to conventional systems. Cool, humid regions might have savings of 17% while hot, arid regions have savings of 42%. Hot, dry climates offer the greatest advantage for radiant cooling as they have the largest proportion of cooling by way of removing sensible heat. While this research is informative, more research needs to be done to account for the limitations of simulation tools and integrated system approaches. Much of the energy savings is also attributed to the lower amount of energy required to pump water as opposed to distribute air with fans. By coupling the system with building mass, radiant cooling can shift some cooling to off-peak night time hours. Radiant cooling appears to have lower first costs and lifecycle costs compared to conventional systems. Lower first costs are largely attributed to integration with structure and design elements, while lower life cycle costs result from decreased maintenance. However, a recent study on comparison of VAV reheat versus active chilled beams & DOAS challenged the claims of lower first cost due to added cost of piping

=== Limiting factors ===
Because of the potential for condensate formation on the cold radiant surface (resulting in water damage, mold and the like), radiant cooling systems have not been widely applied. Condensation caused by humidity is a limiting factor for the cooling capacity of a radiant cooling system. The surface temperature should not be equal or below the dew point temperature in the space. Some standards suggest a limit for the relative humidity in a space to 60% or 70%. An air temperature of 26 °C (79 °F) would mean a dew point between 17 and 20 °C (63 and 68 °F). There is, however, evidence that suggests decreasing the surface temperature to below the dew point temperature for a short period of time may not cause condensation. Also, the use of an additional system, such as a dehumidifier or DOAS, can limit humidity and allow for increased cooling capacity.

== Classification of Radiant Systems ==
Radiant systems, encompassing both heating and cooling, transfer heat or coolness directly through surfaces, such as floors, ceilings, or walls, instead of relying on forced-air systems. These systems are broadly categorized into three types: thermally activated building systems (TABS), embedded surface systems, and radiant ceiling panels.

=== Chilled slabs ===
Radiant cooling from a slab can be delivered to a space from the floor or ceiling. Since radiant heating systems tend to be in the floor, the obvious choice would be to use the same circulation system for cooled water. While this makes sense in some cases, delivering cooling from the ceiling has several advantages.

First, it is easier to leave ceilings exposed to a room than floors, increasing the effectiveness of thermal mass. Floors offer the downside of coverings and furnishings that decrease the effectiveness of the system.

Second, greater convective heat exchange occurs through a chilled ceiling as warm air rises, leading to more air coming in contact with the cooled surface.

Cooling delivered through the floor makes the most sense when there is a high amount of solar gain from sun penetration, because the cool floor can more easily remove those loads than the ceiling.

Chilled slabs, compared to panels, offer more significant thermal mass and therefore can take better advantage of outside diurnal temperatures swings. Chilled slabs cost less per unit of surface area, and are more integrated with structure.

=== Partial radiant systems ===
Chilled beams are hybrid systems that combine radiant and convective heat transfer. While not purely radiant, they are suited for spaces with varying thermal loads and integrate well with ceilings for flexible placement and ventilation.

== Thermal comfort ==
The operative temperature is an indicator of thermal comfort which takes into account the effects of both convection and radiation. Operative temperature is defined as a uniform temperature of a radiantly black enclosure in which an occupant would exchange the same amount of heat by radiation plus convection as in the actual nonuniform environment.

With radiant systems, thermal comfort is achieved at warmer interior temp than all-air systems for cooling scenario, and at lower temperature than all-air systems for heating scenario. Thus, radiant systems can helps to achieve energy savings in building operation while maintaining the wished comfort level.

=== Thermal comfort in radiant vs. all-air buildings ===
Based on a large study performed using Center for the Built Environment's Indoor environmental quality (IEQ) occupant survey to compare occupant satisfaction in radiant and all-air conditioned buildings, both systems create equal indoor environmental conditions, including acoustic satisfaction, with a tendency towards improved temperature satisfaction in radiant buildings.

=== Radiant temperature asymmetry ===
The radiant temperature asymmetry is defined as the difference between the plane radiant temperature of the two opposite sides of a small plane element. As regards occupants within a building, thermal radiation field around the body may be non-uniform due to hot and cold surfaces and direct sunlight, bringing therefore local discomfort. The norm ISO 7730 and the ASHRAE 55 standard give the predicted percentage of dissatisfied occupants (PPD) as a function of the radiant temperature asymmetry and specify the acceptable limits. In general, people are more sensitive to asymmetric radiation caused by a warm ceiling than that caused by hot and cold vertical surfaces. The detailed calculation method of percentage dissatisfied due to a radiant temperature asymmetry is described in ISO 7730.

== Design considerations ==
While specific design requirements will depend on the type of radiant system, a few issues are common to most radiant systems.

- For cooling application, radiant systems can lead condensation issues. Local climate needs to be evaluated and taken into account in the design. Air dehumidification can be necessary for humid climate.
- Many types of radiant systems incorporate massive building elements. The thermal mass involved will have a consequence on the thermal response of the system. The operation schedule of a space and the control strategy of the radiant system play a key role in the proper functioning of the system.
- Many types of radiant systems incorporate hard surfaces which influence indoor acoustics. Additional acoustic solutions may need to be considered.
- A design strategy to reduce acoustical impacts of radiant systems is using free-hanging acoustical clouds. Cooling experiments on free-hanging acoustical clouds for an office room showed that for 47% cloud coverage of the ceiling area, 11% reduction in cooling capacity was caused by the cloud coverage. Good acoustic quality can be achieved with only minor reduction of cooling capacity. Combining acoustical clouds and ceiling fans can offset the modest reduction in cooling capacity from a radiant cooled ceiling caused by the presence of the clouds, and results in increase in cooling capacity.

== Control Strategies and Considerations ==
Heating, Ventilation, and Air Conditioning (HVAC) systems require a control system to supply heating or cooling to a space. The control strategies applied depend on the type of HVAC system used, and these strategies ultimately determine the system's energy consumption. Radiant systems differ from other HVAC systems in terms of heat transfer mechanisms and the potential risk of condensation, requiring tailored control strategies to address these unique characteristics.

=== High Thermal Mass Considerations ===
Radiant systems transfer heat by heating or cooling structural elements, such as concrete slabs or ceilings, rather than directly delivering hot or cold air. These elements primarily release heat through radiation. The response time—the time it takes for the system to reach the setpoint temperature—depends on the material's thermal mass: low thermal mass materials, such as metal panels, respond quickly, while high thermal mass materials, such as concrete slabs, adjust more slowly.
When integrated with high thermal mass elements, radiant systems face challenges due to delayed temperature adjustments. This delay can lead to over-adjustments, resulting in increased energy consumption and reduced thermal comfort.
To address this problem, model Predictive Control (MPC) is often employed to predict future thermal demands and adjust heat supply proactively. For instance, MPC leverages the thermal mass of radiant systems by storing heat during off-peak times, before it is needed. This allows operations to start at night, when electricity costs and urban electricity grid loads are lower. Additionally, cooler nighttime air improves the efficiency of cooling equipment, such as air-source heat pumps, further optimizing energy use. By employing these strategies, radiant systems effectively overcome thermal mass challenges while reducing daytime electricity demand, enhancing grid stability, and lowering operational costs.

=== Condensation Risks and Mitigation Strategies ===
Radiant cooling systems can experience condensation when the surface temperature drops below the dew point of the surrounding air. This may cause occupant discomfort, promote mold growth, and damage radiant surfaces. The risk is particularly high in humid climates, where warm, moist air enters through open windows and contacts cold radiant cooling surfaces. To prevent this, radiant cooling systems must be paired with effective ventilation strategies to control indoor humidity levels.

== Hydronic radiant systems ==
Radiant cooling systems are usually hydronic, cooling using circulating water running in pipes in thermal contact with the surface. Typically the circulating water only needs to be 2–4 °C below the desired indoor air temperature. Once having been absorbed by the actively cooled surface, heat is removed by water flowing through a hydronic circuit, replacing the warmed water with cooler water.

Depending on the position of the pipes in the building construction, hydronic radiant systems can be sorted into 4 main categories:

- Embedded Surface Systems: pipes embedded within the surface layer (not within the structure)
- Thermally Active Building Systems (TABS): the pipes thermally coupled and embedded in the building structure (slabs, walls)
- Capillary Surface Systems: pipes embedded in a layer at the inner ceiling/wall surface
- Radiant Panels: metal pipes integrated into panels (not within the structure); heat carrier close to the surface

=== Types (ISO 11855) ===
The norm ISO 11855-2 focuses on embedded water based surface heating and cooling systems and TABS. Depending on construction details, this norm distinguishes 7 different types of those systems (Types A to G)

- Type A with pipes embedded in the screed or concrete (“wet” system)
- Type B with pipes embedded outside the screed (in the thermal insulation layer, “dry” system)
- Type C with pipes embedded in the leveling layer, above which the second screed layer is placed
- Type D include plane section systems (extruded plastic / group of capillary grids)
- Type E with pipes embedded in a massive concrete layer
- Type F with capillary pipes embedded in a layer at the inner ceiling or as a separate layer in gypsum
- Type G with pipes embedded in a wooden floor construction

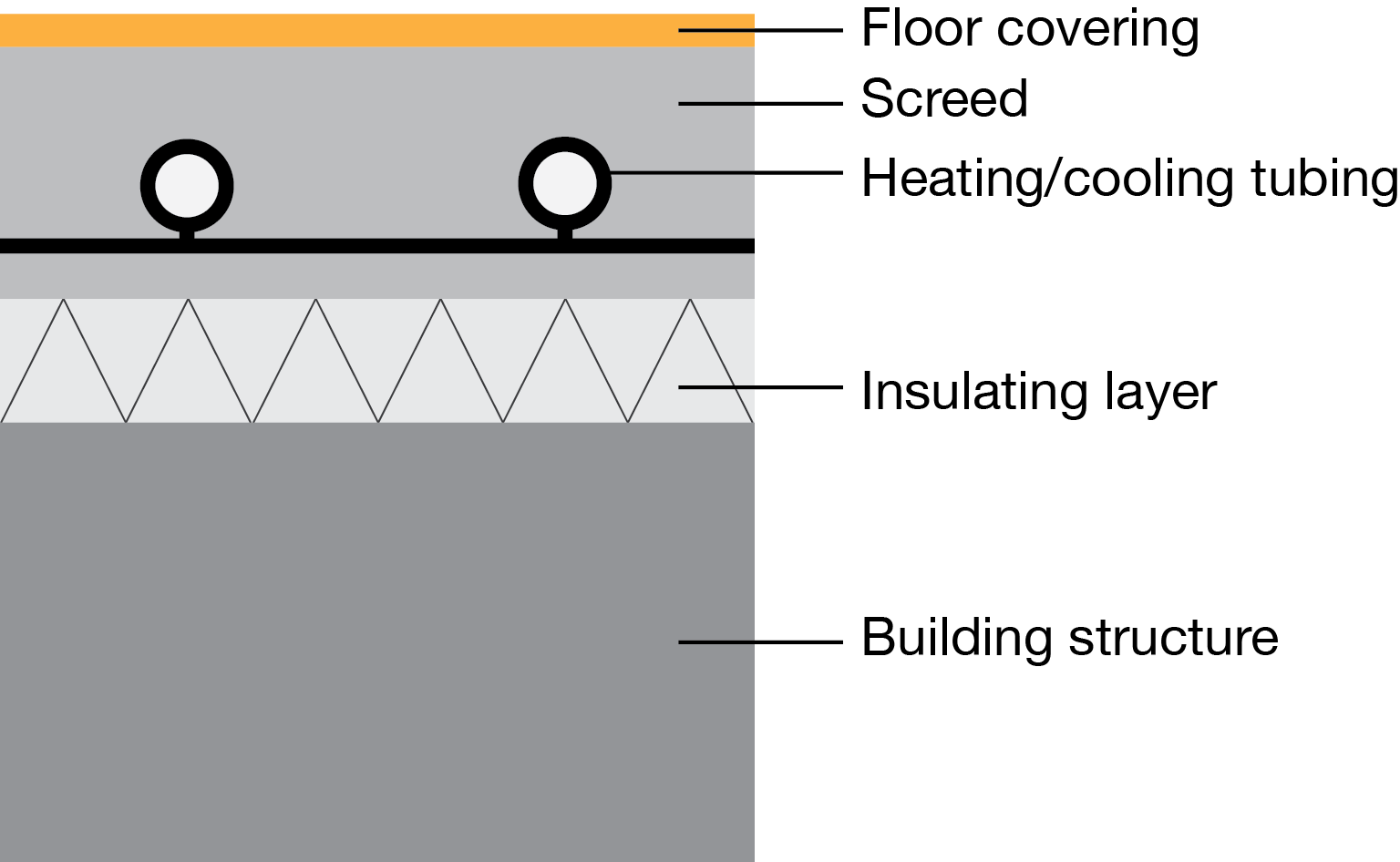
Section diagram of a radiant embedded surface system (ISO 11855, type A)

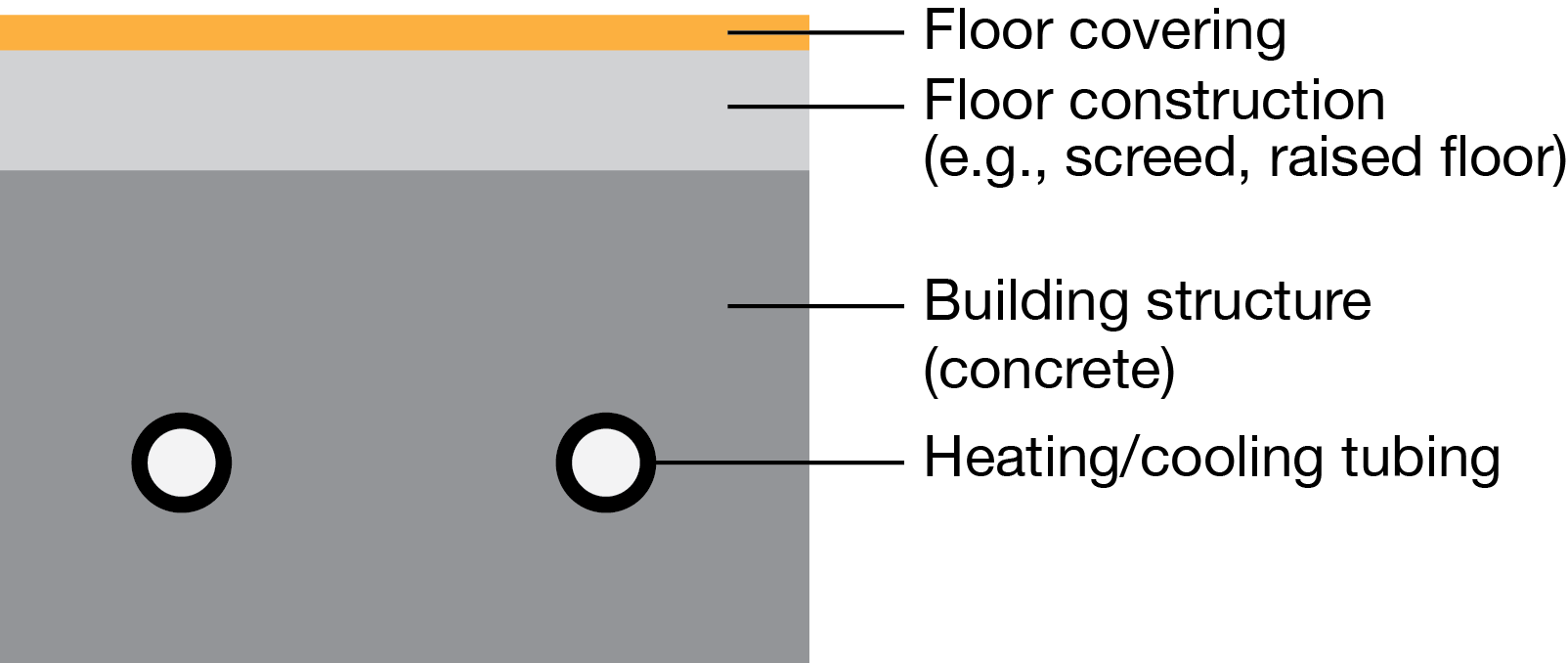
Section diagram of thermally activated building system (ISO 11855, type E)

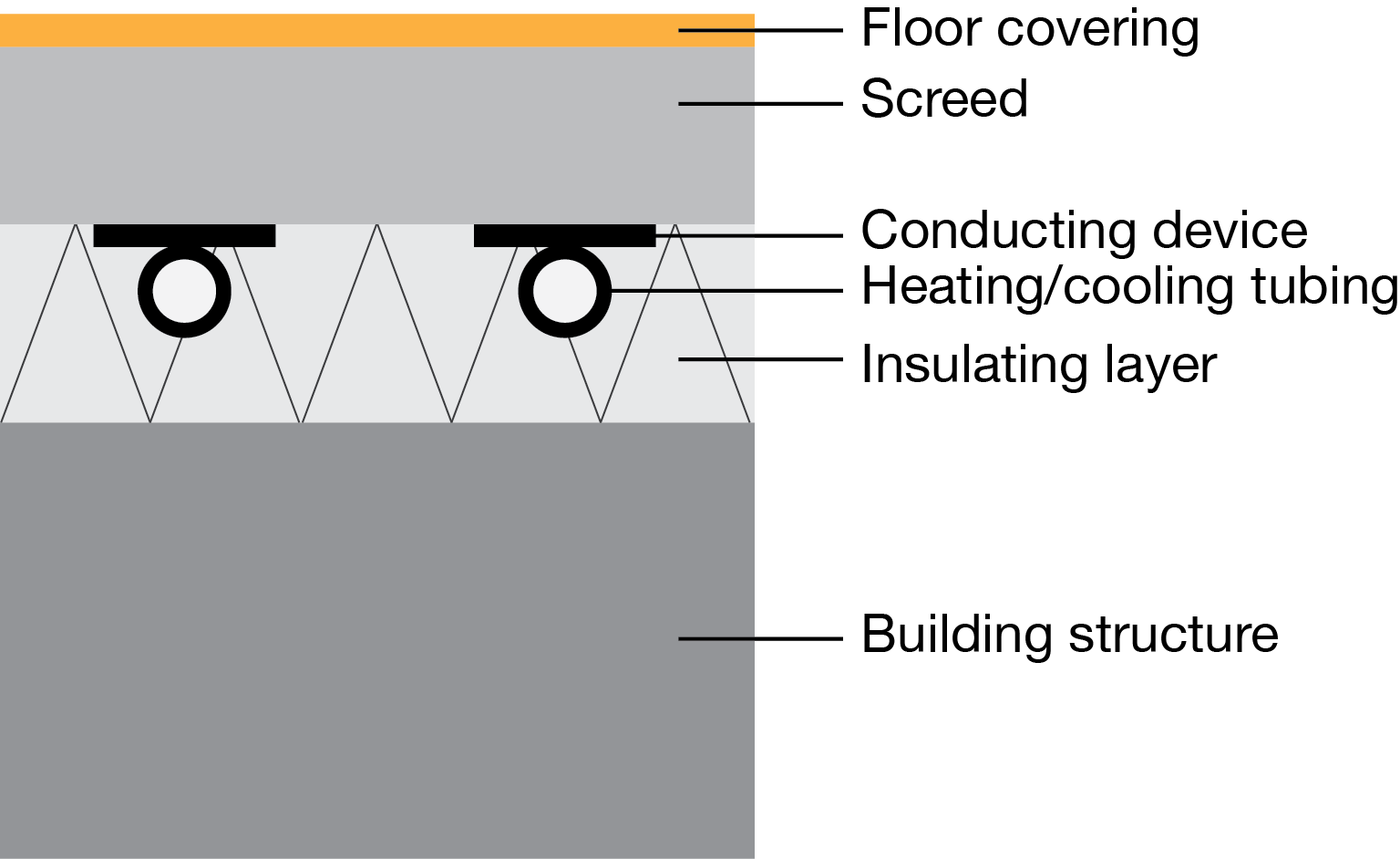
Section diagram of a radiant embedded surface system (ISO 11855, type B)

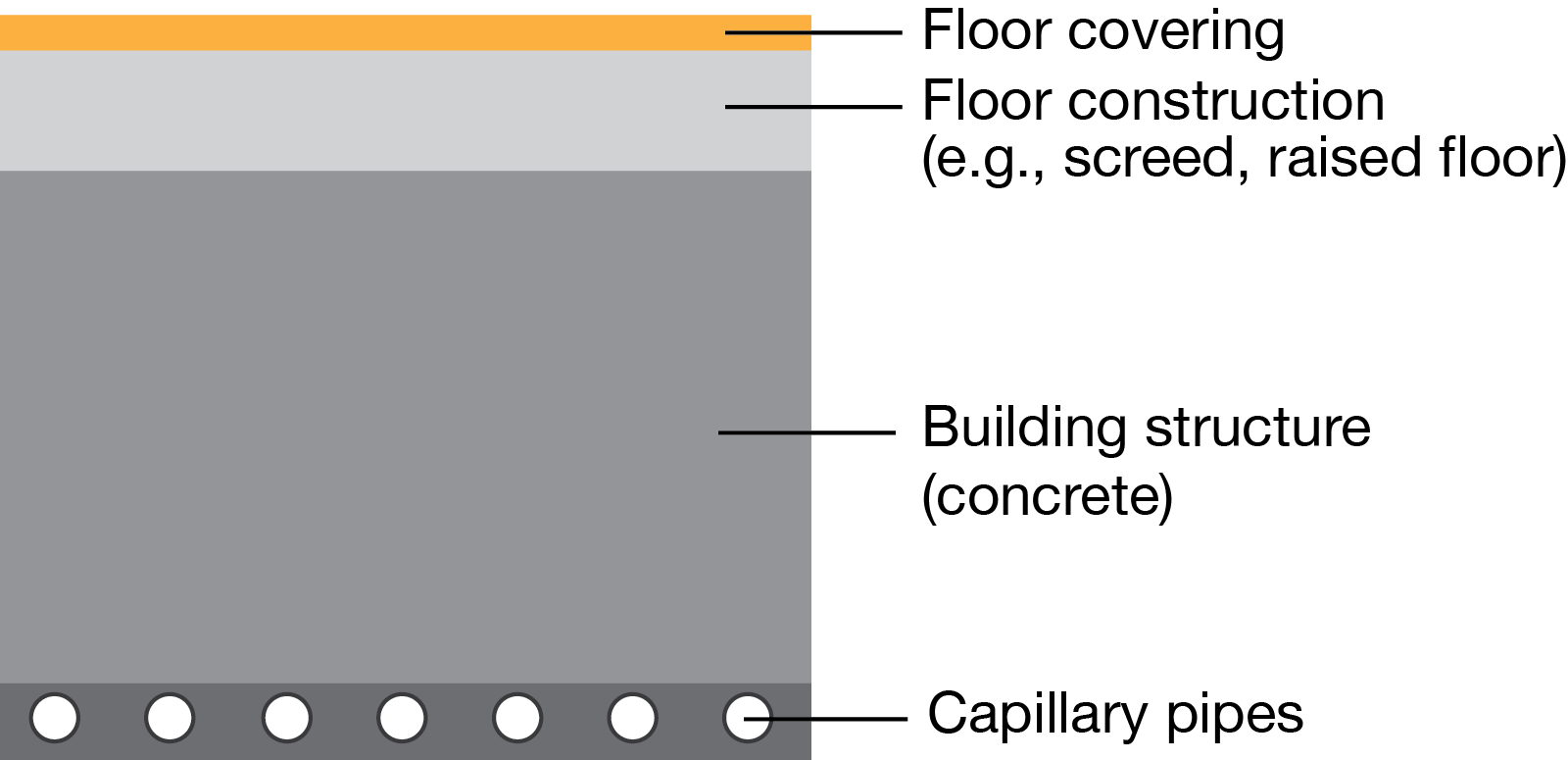
Section diagram of radiant capillary system (ISO 11855, type F)

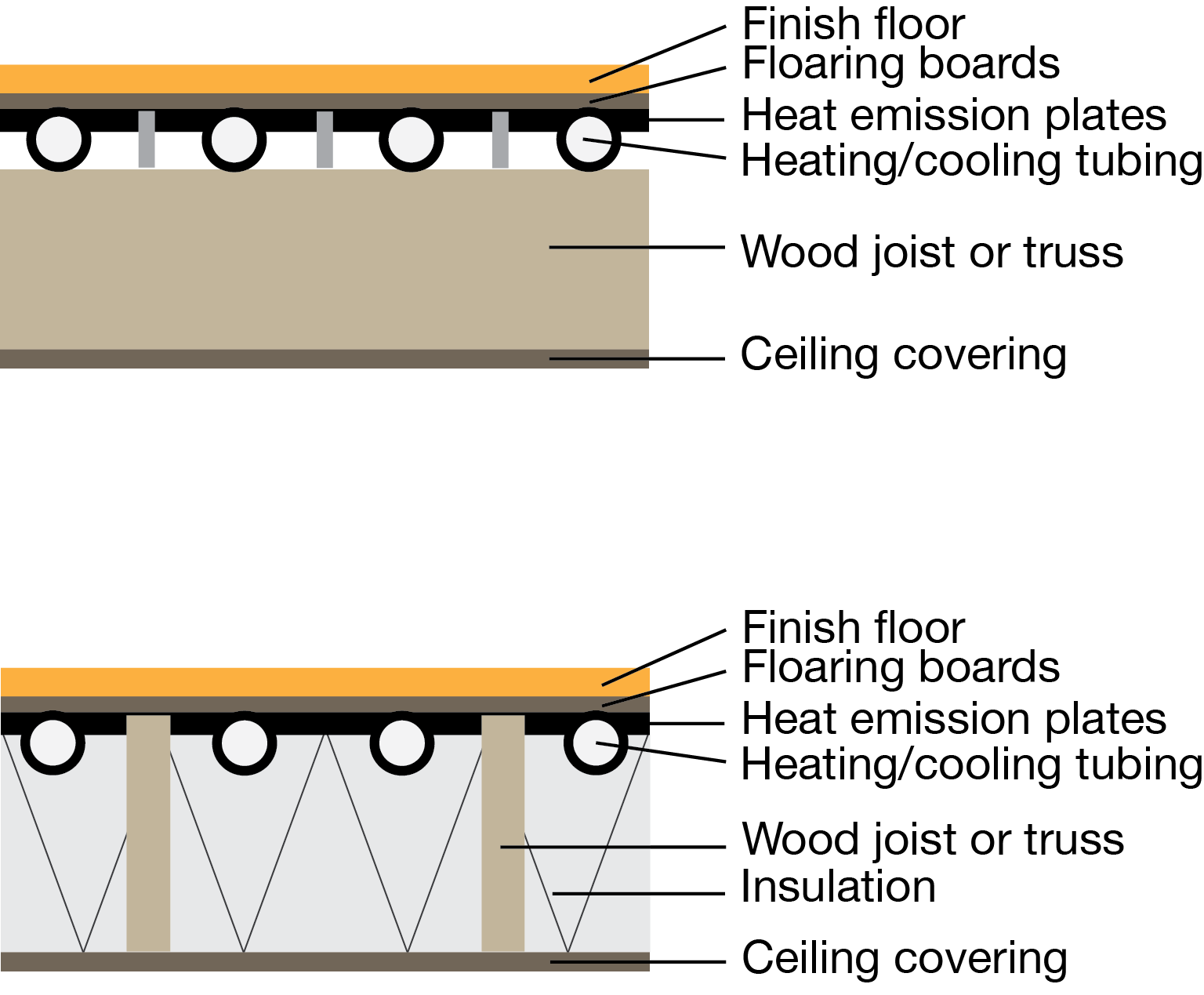
Section diagram of a radiant embedded surface system (ISO 11855, type G)

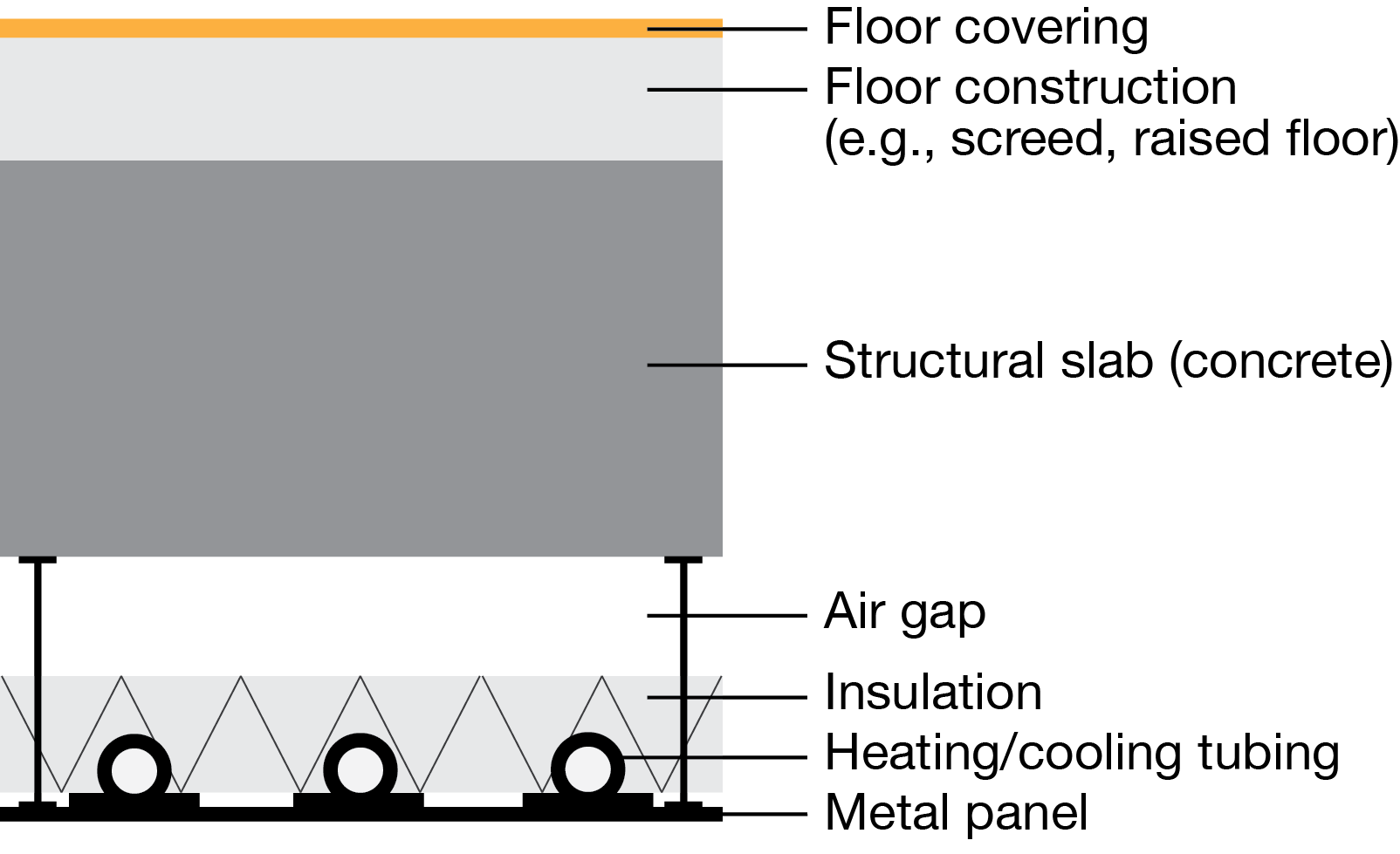
Section diagram of a radiant panel

=== Energy sources ===
Radiant systems are associated with low-exergy systems. Low-exergy refers to the possibility to utilize ‘low quality energy’ (i.e. dispersed energy that has little ability to do useful work). Both heating and cooling can in principle be obtained at temperature levels that are close to the ambient environment. The low temperature difference requires that the heat transmission takes place over relative big surfaces as for example applied in ceilings or underfloor heating systems. Radiant systems using low temperature heating and high temperature cooling are typical example of low-exergy systems. Energy sources such as geothermal (direct cooling / geothermal heat pump heating) and solar hot water are compatible with radiant systems. These sources can lead to important savings in terms of primary energy use for buildings.

== Commercial buildings using radiant cooling ==
Some well-known buildings using radiant cooling include Bangkok's Suvarnabhumi Airport, the Infosys Software Development Building 1 in Hyderabad, IIT Hyderabad, and the San Francisco Exploratorium. Radiant cooling is also used in many zero net energy buildings.

Buildings and Systems Information
Building	Year	Country	City	Architect	Radiant system design	Radiant system category
Kunsthaus Bregenz	1997	Austria	Bregenz	Peter Zumthor	Meierhans+Partner	Thermally activated building systems
Suvarnabhumi Airport	2005	Thailand	Bangkok	Murphy Jahn	Transsolar and IBE	Embedded surface systems
Zollverein School	2006	Germany	Essen	SANAA	Transsolar	Thermally activated building systems
Klarchek Information Commons, Loyola University Chicago	2007	United States	Chicago, IL	Solomon Cordwell Buenz	Transsolar	Thermally activated building systems
Lavin-Bernick Center, Tulane University	2007	United States	New Orleans, LA	VAJJ	Transsolar	Radiant panels
David Brower Center	2009	United States	Berkeley, CA	Daniel Solomon Design Partners	Integral Group	Thermally activated building systems
Manitoba Hydro	2009	Canada	Winnipeg, MB	KPMB Architects	Transsolar	Thermally activated building systems
Cooper Union	2009	United States	New York, NY	Morphosis Architects	IBE / Syska Hennessy Group	Radiant panels
Exploratorium (Pier 15–17)	2013	United States	San Francisco, CA	EHDD	Integral Group	Embedded surface systems
Federal Center South	2012	United States	Seattle, WA	ZGF Architects	WSP Flack+Kurtz	Radiant Panels
Bertschi School Living Science Building Wing	2010	United States	Seattle, WA	KMD Architects	Rushing	Thermally activated building systems
UW Molecular Engineering Building	2012	United States	Seattle, WA	ZGF Architects	Affiliated Engineers	Embedded surface systems
First Hill Streetcar Operations	2014	United States	Seattle, WA	Waterleaf Architecture	LTK Engineering	Thermally activated building systems
Bullitt Center	2013	United States	Seattle, WA	Miller Hull Partnership	PAE Engineering	Embedded surface systems
John Prairie Operations Center	2011	United States	Shelton, WA	TCF Architecture	Interface	Embedded surface systems
University of Florida Lake Nona Research Center	2012	United States	Orlando, FL	HOK	Affiliated Engineers	Radiant Panels
William Jefferson Clinton Presidential Library	2004	United States	Little Rock, AR	Polshek Partnership	WSP Flack+Kurtz / Cromwell	Thermally activated building systems
Hunter Museum of Art	2006	United States	Chattanooga, TN	Randall Stout	IBE	Embedded surface systems
HOK St Louis Office	2015	United States	St. Louis, MO	HOK	HOK	Radiant panels
Carbon Neutral Energy Solutions Laboratory, Georgia Tech	2012	United States	Atlanta, GA	HDR Architecture	HDR Architecture	Thermally activated building systems
City Hall, London (Newham), The Crystal.	2012	United Kingdom	London	WilkinsonEyre	Arup	
Ewha Campus Complex, Ewha Woman's University	2008	South Korea	Seoul	Dominique Perrault, BAUM Architects	HIMEC	Thermally activated building systems

== Physics ==
Heat radiation is the energy in the form of electromagnetic waves emitted by a solid, liquid, or gas as a result of its temperature. In buildings, the radiant heat flow between two internal surfaces (or a surface and a person) is influenced by the emissivity of the heat emitting surface and by the view factor between this surface and the receptive surface (object or person) in the room. Thermal (longwave) radiation travels at the speed of light, in straight lines. It can be reflected. People, equipment, and surfaces in buildings will warm up if they absorb thermal radiation, but the radiation does not noticeably heat up the air it is traveling through. This means heat will flow from objects, occupants, equipment, and lights in a space to a cooled surface as long as their temperatures are warmer than that of the cooled surface and they are within the direct or indirect line of sight of the cooled surface. Some heat is also removed by convection because the air temperature will be lowered when air comes in contact with the cooled surface.

The heat transfer by radiation is proportional to the power of four of the absolute surface temperature.

The emissivity of a material (usually written ε or e) is the relative ability of its surface to emit energy by radiation. A black body has an emissivity of 1 and a perfect reflector has an emissivity of 0.

In radiative heat transfer, a view factor quantifies the relative importance of the radiation that leaves an object (person or surface) and strikes another one, considering the other surrounding objects. In enclosures, radiation leaving a surface is conserved, therefore, the sum of all view factors associated with a given object is equal to 1. In the case of a room, the view factor of a radiant surface and a person depend on their relative positions. As a person is often changing position and as a room might be occupied by many persons at the same time, diagrams for omnidirectional person can be used.

=== Thermal response time ===
Response time (τ95), aka time constant, is used to analyze the dynamic thermal performance of radiant systems. The response time for a radiant system is defined as the time it takes for the surface temperature of a radiant system to reach 95% of the difference between its final and initial values when a step change in control of the system is applied as input. It is mainly influenced by concrete thickness, pipe spacing, and to a less degree, concrete type. It is not affected by pipe diameter, room operative temperature, supply water temperature, and water flow regime. By using response time, radiant systems can be classified into fast response (τ95< 10 min, like RCP), medium response (1 h<τ95<9 h, like Type A, B, D, G) and slow response (9 h< τ95<19 h, like Type E and Type F). Additionally, floor and ceiling radiant systems have different response times due to different heat transfer coefficients with room thermal environment, and the pipe-embedded position.

=== Other HVAC systems that exchange heat by radiation ===
Fireplaces and woodstoves

A fireplace provides radiant heating, but also draws in cold air. A: Air for the combustion, in drafty rooms pulled from the outdoors. B: Hot exhaust gas heats building by convection as it leaves by chimney. C: Radiant heat, mostly from the high temperature flame, heats as it is absorbed

== See also ==
- Glossary of HVAC
