= Uniqa Insurance Group =

Insurance group in Central and Eastern Europe

Uniqa Insurance Group AG

- Headquarters building, Vienna
- Type: Aktiengesellschaft
- Traded as: WBAG: UQA
- ISIN: AT0000821103
- Industry: Insurance
- Founded: 1811/1999
- Headquarters: Vienna, Austria
- Area served: Europe
- Key people: Andreas Brandstetter (CEO)
- Revenue: €5.37 billion (2019)
- Number of employees: 13,038 (2019)
- Website: www.uniqagroup.com

The Uniqa Insurance Group AG (corporately styled "UNIQA") is one of the largest insurance groups in its core markets of Austria and Central and Eastern Europe and has approximately 40 companies in 14 countries and serve about 17 million customers. The corporate headquarters is located in the Uniqa Tower in Vienna, Austria and is listed on the Vienna Stock Exchange.

== History ==
Uniqa was established in 1999. In 2000, Uniqa started its policy of expansion abroad and acquired companies in Italy, Poland, Austria, Hungary, Liechtenstein, Slovakia, the Czech Republic, Romania, Slovenia, Bosnia and Herzegovina, Bulgaria, Ukraine, Serbia, North Macedonia, Kosovo, Albania, Montenegro, Russia, Spain, Lithuania, Germany and Croatia.

On 1 July 2011, a new management board team headed by Andreas Brandstetter took over at the Uniqa Insurance Group. The new team developed a new growth strategy and began to implement it. In April 2012, the Uniqa Group sold its majority interest in the German Mannheimer AG Holding. In May 2013, Uniqa Austria became the biggest insurer in Austria with 14% market share. In October 2013, Uniqa signed an agreement with Baloise Group to acquire insurance companies in Croatia and Serbia.

In March 2014, Uniqa Insurance Group AG was included in the benchmark index of the Vienna Stock Exchange (ATX). In July 2015, Uniqa resolved the sale of indirect interest in Casinos Austria AG. In January 2016, Uniqa launched the largest investment and innovation programme in its history amounting to around €500 million. In October 2016, the company completed the reorganisation of the Group's structure.

In December 2017, Kurt Svoboda became CEO of the Uniqa Österreich Versicherungen AG. In 2018, Uniqa became the first Austrian insurance group to announce the gradual elimination of carbon-based transactions.

In March 2019, Uniqa was the first insurer to be awarded with the OGUT Sustainability Certificate, based on the decision to remove all investments related to coal industry. In November 2019, the company decided to reduce the number of management board members of the three major companies in Austria from 11 to 9.

In February 2020 Uniqa acquired Axa's subsidiaries in Poland, the Czech Republic and Slovakia for one billion euros. The acquisition was approved by the EU-Commission in July 2020 and was completed in October 2020 as the largest acquisition in company history.

In November 2024, UNIQA Insurance Group AG decided, as part of its country portfolio management, to sell its 90% stake in SIGAL UNIQA Group Austria, the insurance conglomerate operating in Albania, Kosovo, and North Macedonia (referred to as “ALMAKOS”).

== Company ==
Uniqa Insurance Group has approximately 40 companies in 14 countries and serve about 17 million customers. The group is divided into Uniqa Austria, Uniqa International, Uniqa Reinsurance and further national companies. The corporate sponsorships include measures relating to the environment, society, culture and sports.

=== Key figures in Euro thousand ===
	2019	2018	2017
Premiums written	5.372,6	5.309,5	5.293,3
Net investment income	295,7	294,6	254,6
Investments	20.624,8	19.337,1	20.059,2
Total assets	28.728,4	28.616,2	28.743,9
Average number of employees (FTE)	13.038	12.818	12.839

== Management ==
Uniqa Insurance Group was established in 1999. It is the parent company of the Uniqa Group and acts as the central reinsurer. The group is listed on the Vienna Stock Exchange. The members of the management board are Andreas Brandstetter (CEO), Erik Leyers (COO) and Kurt Svoboda (CFRO)

== Sponsorships ==
The company is the sponsor of sports teams, events and organisations, including the Austria national football team, Austrian Federal Sports Organization, Austrian Cup (football), Uniqa Classic (cycling), First Vienna FC (football) as well as athletes like Matthias Mayer (ski racer) and Bernadette Schild (ski racer). In 2017, the company was main sponsor of the Special Olympics World Winter Games. Uniqa Insurance Group supports Austrian museums, such as the Albertina, Kunsthistorisches Museum and Vienna Technical Museum as well as events like Grafenegg Festival and the children's and youth program of the Salzburg Festival.

== Uniqa Tower ==
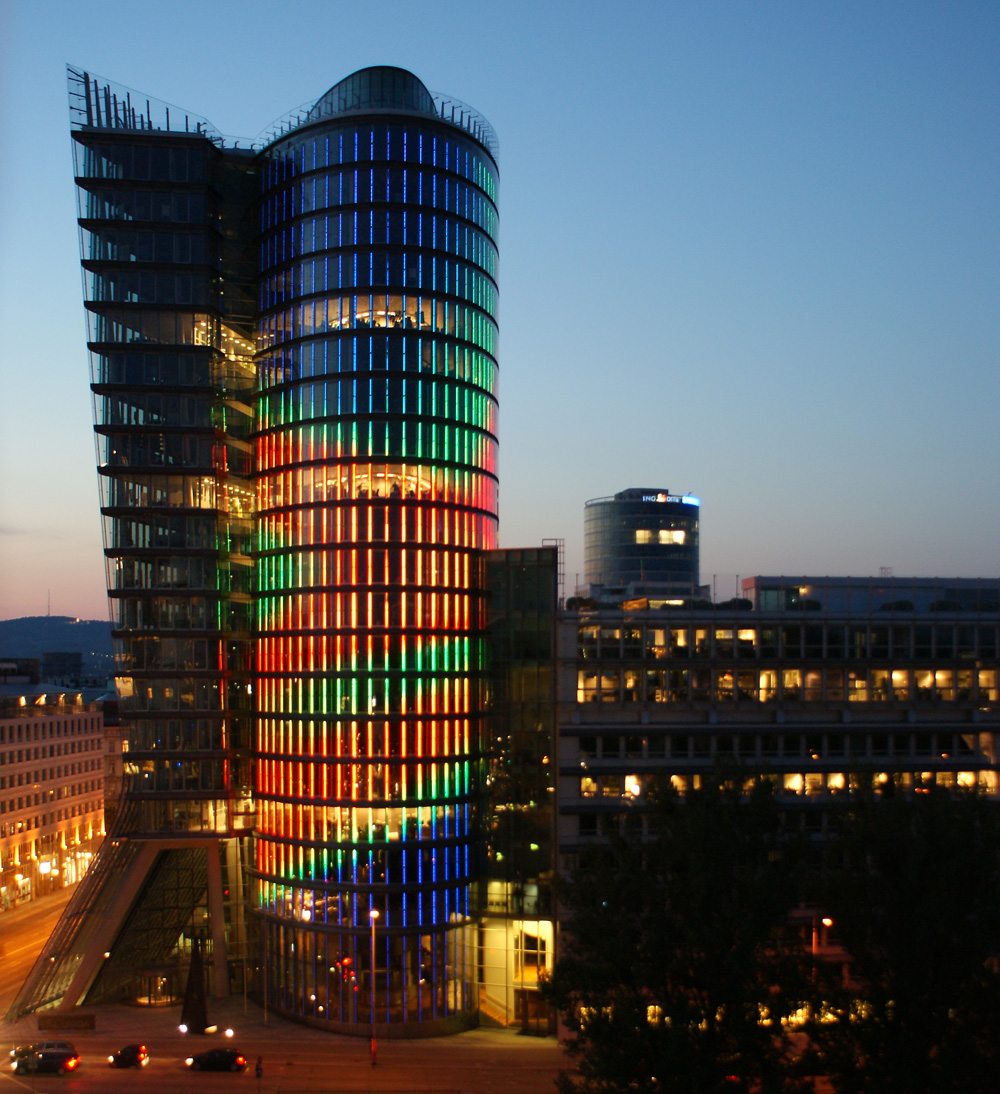
The UNIQA Tower, the company's headquarters.

Uniqa Tower is the headquarters building of the group and was realized by architect Heinz Neumann in 2005. The 75 metre high building costs 70 million euro and is located in Vienna's district Leopoldstadt.
