= Uniqa Tower =

Office building in Vienna, Austria

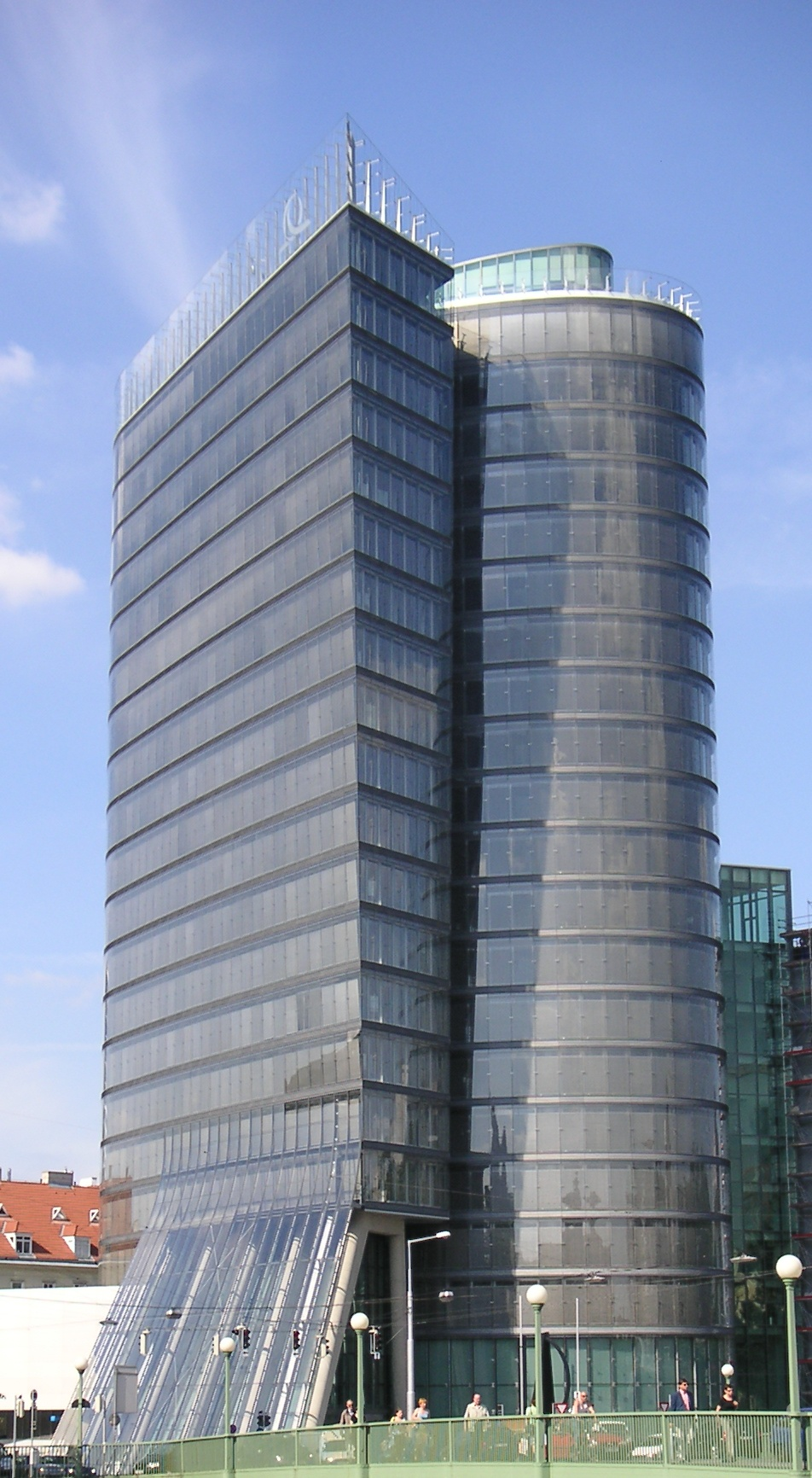
- Uniqa Tower, Wien
- Interactive map of the Uniqa Tower area

General information
- Status: Completed
- Type: modern
- Location: Vienna, Austria
- Coordinates: 48.2128°N 16.3836°E
- Construction started: October 2001
- Completed: June 2004
- Opening: 25. June 2005
- Cost: 70,04 million euro
- Owner: Uniqa Insurance Group

Height
- Height: 80.7 m (265 ft)

Technical details
- Floor count: 25
- Floor area: 38,500 m^{2} (414,000 ft^{2})

Design and construction
- Architect: Heinz Neumann
- Developer: UNIQA Immobilien-Projekterrichtungs GmbH

The Uniqa Tower (owner's spelling: UNIQA Tower) is an office building on the Danube Canal in Leopoldstadt, the 2nd district of Vienna. The building received the European Union Green Building label. It is the first building in Austria and one of the first buildings in Europe to bear the label.

== Architecture ==
The tower is 75 meters high, has 21 upper floors and five basement floors. The shape of the floor plan is a stylized "Q", as it corresponds to the logo of Uniqa Insurance Group located in the building. The more than 7,000 square meter facade was designed as a media facade with a dot matrix of LEDs. It consists of more than 40,000 pixels, based on approximately 160,000 individual LEDs. The system works on a video component basis with 25 frames per second. The concept was provided by the lighting design office Licht Kunst Licht in cooperation with the German media artists Holger Mader, Alexander Stublic and Heike Wiermann. The technical implementation was carried out by the Belgian technology company Barco. The media façade is also occasionally used as a large billboard. The Uniqa Tower was built between October 2001 and June 2004 for approximately 70 million euros.

The official opening took place on 25 June 2005. The architect of the building is Heinz Neumann from Vienna. When it was built, the Tower was the first new office building in Austria to be awarded the EU label Green Building. One third of the building's energy consumption is provided for by a heat pump and geothermal heating.

== See also ==
- Official press release
- Uniqa-Tower - Facts & Figures
