= Chilled beam =

Type of radiation/convection HVAC system

A chilled beam is a type of radiation/convection HVAC system designed to heat and cool large buildings through the use of water. This method removes most of the zone sensible local heat gains and allows the flow rate of pre-conditioned air from the air handling unit to be reduced, lowering by 60% to 80% the ducted design airflow rate and the equipment capacity requirements.

There are two types of chilled beams, a Passive Chilled Beam (PCB) and an Active Chilled Beam (ACB). They both consist of pipes of water (fin-and-tube) that pass through a heat exchanger contained in a case suspended from, or recessed in, the ceiling. As the beam cools the air around it, the air becomes denser and falls to the floor. It is replaced by warmer air moving up from below, causing a constant passive air movement called convection, to cool the room. The active beam consists of air duct connections, induction nozzles, hydronic heat transfer coils, supply outlets and induced air inlets. It contains an integral air supply that passes through nozzles, and induces air from the room to the cooling coil. For this reason, it has a better cooling capacity than the passive beam. Instead, the passive beam provides space cooling without the use of a fan and it is mainly done by convection. Passive beams can be either exposed or recessed. The passive approach can provide higher thermal comfort levels, while the active approach (also called an "induction diffuser") uses the momentum of ventilation air that enters at relatively high velocity to induce the circulation of room air through the unit (thus increasing its heating and cooling capacity).

The chilled beam is distinguishable from the chilled ceiling. The chilled ceiling uses water flow through pipes like a chilled beam does; however, the pipes in a chilled ceiling lie behind metal ceiling plates, and the heated/cooled plates are the cause of the radiation/convection and not the pipe unit itself. Chilled beams are about 85 percent more effective at convection than chilled ceilings. The chilled ceiling must cover a relatively large ceiling area both because it is less efficient, and because it provides heating mainly by radiant means. Radiant heating capacity is proportional to surface area.

== Installation ==
Active chilled beams are mounted in a suspended ceiling and then anchored to the overhead structure, because T-bar ceilings cannot support the typical operating weight of a chilled beam. The beams are generally 1 to 2 feet (0.30 to 0.61 m) wide, and require less than 1 foot (0.30 m) of overhead space. A typical 2-foot (0.61 m) wide chilled beam system generally weighs about 15 pounds (6.8 kg) per 1 foot (0.30 m) length of the beam while dry. Beams can be installed in a number of forms - fully exposed, recessed, or hidden within a suspended or perforated ceiling. When working within a suspended ceiling grid, the beams need to be installed before the grid - approximately 60 to 75mm above the finished ceiling, then lowered after the ceiling’s installation. The final mounting should allow for 3 inches (7.6 cm) of movement in all directions. Chilled beams are generally installed so that the center of each beam is no more than 3 metres (9.8 ft) from the center of the next beam. Some architects and end-users dislike the beams because they do not cover the entire ceiling so ducts, wiring, and other infrastructure can be seen. Beams are usually connected to the main supply and return water lines with flexible hoses. To minimize corrosion, oxygen diffusion resistant hoses can be installed. Higher system performance may be obtained by increasing the static pressure of the air in the building. The chilled beams are considered as easy to mount as light fixtures, but require suitable access for service and maintenance. The systems generally need little cleaning (vacuuming of dirt and dust from the fins every five years).

The active chilled beam system employs fins to help heat and cool. Active chilled beam systems are effective to the point where outdoor air can be mixed with the indoor air without any traditional air conditioning (such as heating, cooling, humidifying, or dehumidifying), thus enabling a building to meet its "minimum outdoor air" air quality requirement.

Chilled beam cooling systems require water to be treated by heating and cooling systems. Generally, water in a passive chilled beam system is cooled to about 16 to 19 °C (61 to 66 °F). In active chilled beam heating systems, water temperature is usually 40 to 50 °C (104 to 122 °F). (Chilled beam heating systems usually cannot rely solely on convection, however, and often require a fan-driven primary air circulation system to force the warmer air to the ground where most people sit and work.) There are effectiveness and cost differences between passive and active beam systems. Passive chilled beam systems can supply about 5.6 to 6.5 watts per foot (60 to 70 watts per meter) of cooling capacity. Active chilled beam systems are about twice as effective. In both cases, convection is so efficient that the ratio of incoming air to heated/cooled air can be as high as 6:1. However, studies of the energy cost-savings of active versus passive chilled beam systems remain inconclusive as of 2007, and appear to be highly dependent on the specific building.

An important consideration in the implementation of chilled beam systems is the amount of air that will need to be supplied to a zone based on code requirements (which chilled beam systems may not be able to achieve) and the dehumidification requirements. Schools, offices, and hotels/dormitories are three program types that can benefit from the use of chilled beams, because the decreased plenum space allows for taller ceilings and the decreased fan lowers noise levels which is beneficial for learning, work, and sleep. In contrast, hospital patient rooms require higher air quality levels, and thus need more ventilation than cooling and heating load than a chilled beam system is able to supply.

=== Physics Background ===
Water can carry significantly more energy than air, and is approximately 800 times denser than standard air. Although 1 cubic foot (0.028 m^{3}) of air has a capacity to hold heat of 37 joules per kelvin (JK^{−1}), the same volume of water has a heat capacity of 20,050 JK^{−1}. A metal pipe of water just 1 inch (2.5 cm) in diameter can carry as much energy as an 18-by-18-inch (46 by 46 cm) metal duct of air. This means that chilled beam HVAC systems require much less energy to provide the same heating and cooling effect as a traditional air HVAC system.

The total cooling capacity of a chilled beam is found through the primary air (P_{a}) and coil cooling capacity (P_{w}) values: P= P_{a} + P_{w}

In design practice it is common to see the chilled beam water side cooling capacity estimated with the following equation: P_{w} = Q_{m} c_{w} (t_{w2} - t_{w1}) where Q_{m} is the mass flow rate of water c_{w} is the specific heat capacity of water t_{w2} is the water temperature exiting the coil t_{w1} is the water temperature entering the coil

== Advantages and disadvantages ==
The primary advantage of the chilled beam system is its lower operating cost because the system requires much less energy to provide the same heating and cooling effect as a traditional air HVAC system. Water can provide the same cooling ability as air without needing to be cooled as low in temperature, saving energy. Because cooling and heating of air are no longer linked to the delivery of air, buildings can save money by running fewer air circulation fans at lower speeds. One estimate places the amount of air handled at 25 to 50 percent less using chilled beam systems. By targeting the delivery of clean outdoor air where it is needed (rather than injecting it into the entire system to heat and cool), there is a reduced need to treat large amounts of outdoor air (which saves money). In one case, the Genomic Science Building at the University of North Carolina at Chapel Hill lowered its HVAC costs by 20 percent with an active chilled beam system. This is a typical energy cost savings. Chilled beam systems also have some advantages in that they are almost noiseless, require little maintenance, and are highly efficient. Traditional fan-driven HVAC systems create somewhat higher air velocities, which some people find uncomfortable. Chilled beam HVAC systems also require less ceiling space than forced-air HVAC systems, which can lead to lower building heights and higher ceilings. Since they do not require high forced air flows, they do require reduced air distribution duct networks (which also helps to lower cost).

Chilled beam systems are not a panacea. Additional ductwork may be needed to meet minimum outdoor air requirements. Both types of chilled beam systems are less effective at heating than cooling, and supplementary heating systems are often needed. Chilled beam systems cannot be used alone in buildings where the ceilings are higher than 2.7 metres (8.9 ft), because the air will not properly circulate. A forced-air circulation system must be employed in such cases. Chilled beams do not typically contain a condensate drainage system so If the water temperature is too low or humidity is high, condensation on the beam can occur—leading to a problem known as "internal rain." (In some cases, drier outside air can be mixed with the wetter inside air to reduce interior humidity levels while maintaining system performance.) Chilled beam systems are not recommended for areas with high humidity (such as theaters, gymnasiums, or cafeterias). Because they are less effective at cooling, passive chilled beam systems are generally ill-suited for semi-tropical and tropical climates. Hospitals generally cannot use chilled beam systems because of restrictions on using recirculated air. Chilled beam systems are also known to cause noticeable air circulation which can make some people uncomfortable. (Passive air deflection devices can help disrupt these air patterns, alleviating the problem.) Some designers have found that enlarging the ducts around active chilled beam systems to increase air circulation causes echoes in working areas and amplifies the sound of water moving through the pipes to noticeable levels. Since chilled beams are water-based systems, piping (both supply and return) and control valves should be field-installed to distribute chilled water to multiple beams in every space of the building. This increases installation costs, while also increasing the risk of water leaks due to the increased pipe connections.

Chilled beams were found to achieve acceptable thermal uniformity (with one paper by Rhee et al finding the Vertical Thermal Difference to be less than 1°C while using a small air flow rate, which saves energy. But around perimeter zones the increased cooling load can increase causing a negative impact on the thermal uniformity. A solution for this, used by some designers is to install one chilled beam system around the building perimeter (where temperature differences can be the greatest) and another in the interior of the building, to better control temperature throughout the structure.

== Adoption ==
The multiservice chilled beam is a relatively new form of the chilled beam. Developed in 1996, it incorporates computer and electrical wiring, lighting, motion-detection sensors, and sprinklers into the chilled beam unit. The multiservice chilled beam was first installed at the Barclaycard building in Northampton, England, but has since been used at the headquarters of Lloyd's Register (London), Airbus UK (Bristol), and the Greater London Authority; Riverside House (London); Empress State Building (London); 55 Baker Street (London) and 101 New Cavendish Street (London).

As of 2007, chilled beam HVAC systems were used more widely in Australia and Europe than in the United States. But the system has had increased use in U.S. markets as of 2020. In Australia, the system was first used in 30 The Bond, Sydney which was the first building in Australia to achieve the rating of 5 stars ABGR. Chilled beam HVAC systems have been used at Heathrow Terminal 5 and Constitution Center (the largest private office building in Washington, D.C.). The system has also received prominent use at Harvard Business School, Wellesley College, and the American headquarters of the pharmaceutical company AstraZeneca.
