= Heat =

Type of energy transfer

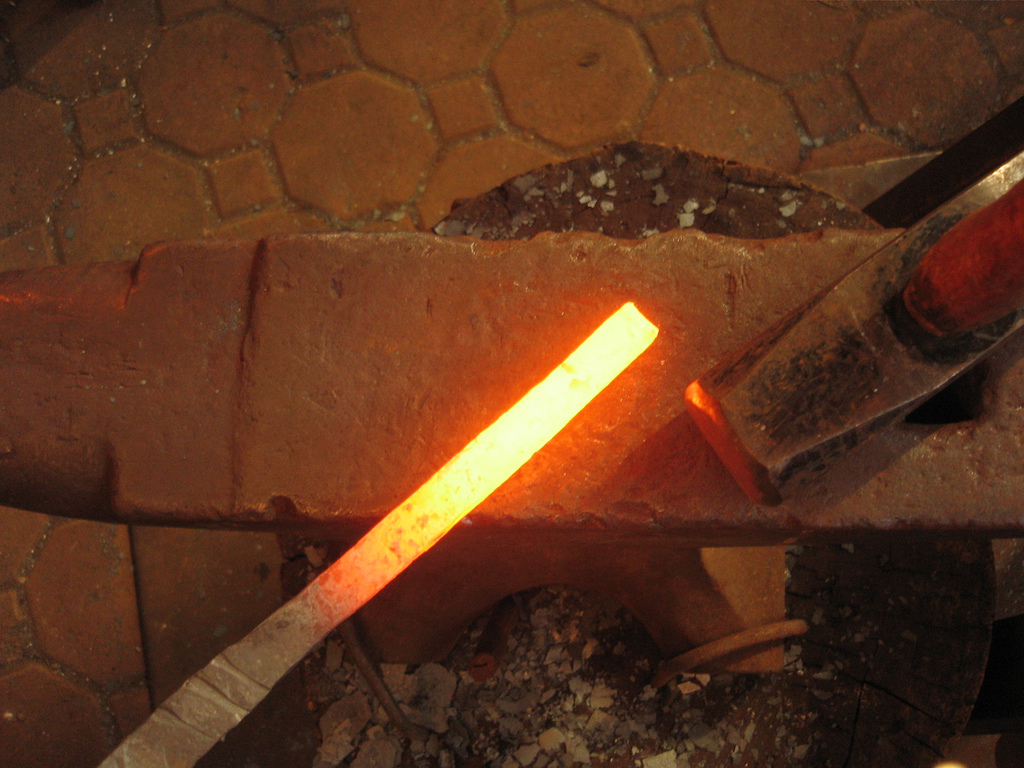
- A glowing-hot metal bar showing incandescence, the emission of light due to its temperature, is often recognized as a source of heat.
- Common symbols: $Q$
- SI unit: joule
- Other units: British thermal unit, calorie
- In SI base units: kg⋅m^{2}⋅s^{−2}
- Dimension: $\mathsf{L}^2 \mathsf{M} \mathsf{T}^{-2}$

In thermodynamics, heat is defined as energy in transfer between a body and its surroundings, other than through thermodynamic work or through transfer of matter.

Rather than by mechanical or other effects in the surroundings, thermodynamic work is defined through changes in the system's macroscopic state variables, in conjugate pairs such as pressure and volume, or magnetisation and magnetic field strength. The thermodynamic definition of heat is by exclusion of other defined modes of transfer in order to ensure a strict logical distinction.

In the process of transfer, heat is not necessarily conserved, but can be generated (though not destroyed) by friction. In thermodynamics, temperature is defined in macroscopic terms, through the concepts of heat and work. Heat is not a state variable or state function; it is a process quantity. A thermodynamic system does not contain heat.

Heat can enter or leave a body of matter by thermal conduction, by electromagnetic radiation, or through friction, due to macroscopic mechanical rubbing, drilling, grinding or stirring, or due to electrical resistance to the passage of electrical current through the body, known as Joule heating, or due to repeated magnetization and demagnetization. When heat is generated by friction, it may end up partly in each of the two engaged bodies. When energy enters or leaves a body through transfer of matter, it cannot be resolved uniquely into work and heat.

By assuming conservation of heat in a transfer, calorimetry measures it by its effect on the states of interacting bodies, for example, by the amount of ice melted or by change in temperature of a body.

In the International System of Units (SI), the unit of measurement for heat is the joule (J).

== Notation and units ==
As a form of energy, heat has the unit joule (J) in the International System of Units (SI). In addition, many applied branches of engineering use other, traditional units, such as the British thermal unit (BTU) and the calorie. The standard unit for the rate of heating is the watt (W), defined as one joule per second.

The symbol Q for heat was introduced by Rudolf Clausius and Macquorn Rankine in c. 1859.

Heat released by a system into its surroundings is by convention, as a contributor to internal energy, a negative quantity (Q < 0); when a system absorbs heat from its surroundings, it is positive (Q > 0). Heat transfer rate, or heat flow per unit time, is denoted by $\dot{Q}$, but it is not a time derivative of a function of state (which can also be written with the dot notation) since heat is not a function of state. Heat flux is defined as rate of heat transfer per unit cross-sectional area (watts per square metre).

== History ==
In ordinary language, English 'heat' or 'warmth', just as French chaleur, German Hitze or Wärme, Latin calor, Greek θάλπος, etc. refers to either thermal energy or temperature, or the human perception of these. Later, chaleur (as used by Sadi Carnot), 'heat', and Wärme became equivalents also as specific scientific terms at an early stage of thermodynamics. Speculation on 'heat' as a separate form of matter has a long history, involving the phlogiston theory, the caloric theory, and fire. Many careful and accurate historical experiments practically exclude friction, mechanical and thermodynamic work and matter transfer, investigating transfer of energy only by thermal conduction and radiation. Such experiments give impressive rational support to the caloric theory of heat. To account also for changes of internal energy due to friction, and mechanical and thermodynamic work, the caloric theory was, around the end of the eighteenth century, replaced by the "mechanical" theory of heat, which is accepted today.

=== 17th century–early 18th century ===
==== "Heat is motion" ====
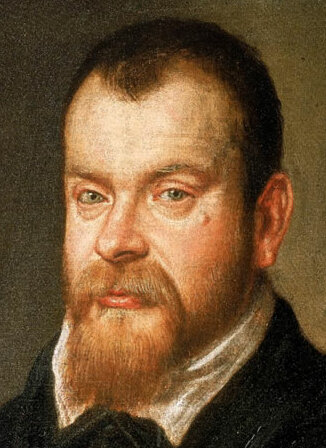
Galileo Galilei

As scientists of the early modern age began to adopt the view that matter consists of particles, a close relationship between heat and the motion of those particles was widely surmised, or even the equivalency of the concepts, boldly expressed by the English philosopher Francis Bacon in 1620. "It must not be thought that heat generates motion, or motion heat (though in some respects this be true), but that the very essence of heat ... is motion and nothing else." "not a ... motion of the whole, but of the small particles of the body." In The Assayer (published 1623) Galileo Galilei, in turn, described heat as an artifact of our minds.

... about the proposition "motion is the cause of heat"... I suspect that people in general have a concept of this which is very remote from the truth. For they believe that heat is a real phenomenon, or property ... which actually resides in the material by which we feel ourselves warmed.

Galileo wrote that heat and pressure are apparent properties only, caused by the movement of particles, which is a real phenomenon. In 1665, and again in 1681, English polymath Robert Hooke reiterated that heat is nothing but the motion of the constituent particles of objects, and in 1675, his colleague, Anglo-Irish scientist Robert Boyle repeated that this motion is what heat consists of.

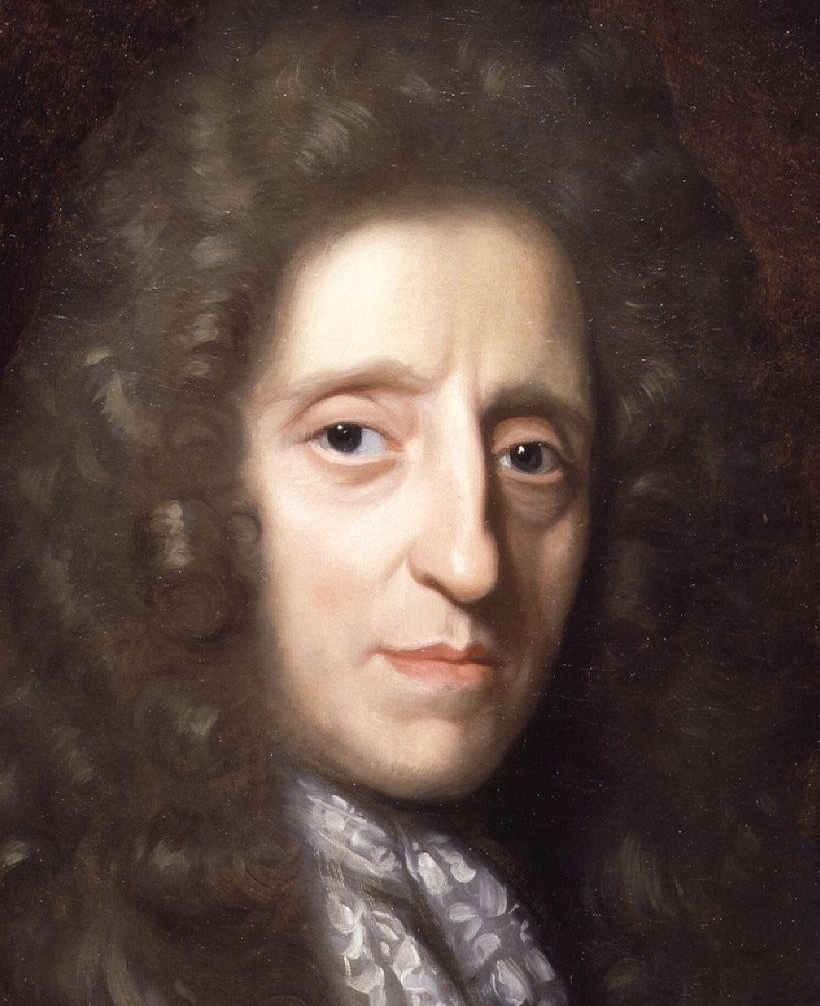
John Locke

Heat has been discussed in ordinary language by philosophers. An example is this 1720 quote from the English philosopher John Locke:

Heat, is a very brisk agitation of the insensible parts of the object, which produces in us that sensation from whence we denominate the object hot; so what in our sensation is heat, in the object is nothing but motion. This appears by the way, whereby heat is produc'd: for we see that the rubbing of a brass nail upon a board, will make it very hot; and the axle-trees of carts and coaches are often hot, and sometimes to a degree, that it sets them on fire, by the rubbing of the nave of the wheel upon it.

When Bacon, Galileo, Hooke, Boyle and Locke wrote "heat", they might more have referred to what we would now call "temperature". No clear distinction was made between heat and temperature until the mid-18th century, nor between the internal energy of a body and the transfer of energy as heat until the mid-19th century.

Locke's description of heat was repeatedly quoted by English physicist James Prescott Joule. Also the transfer of heat was explained by the motion of particles. Scottish physicist and chemist Joseph Black wrote: "Many have supposed that heat is a tremulous ... motion of the particles of matter, which ... motion they imagined to be communicated from one body to another." John Tyndall's Heat Considered as Mode of Motion (1863) was instrumental in popularizing the idea of heat as motion to the English-speaking public. The theory was developed in academic publications in French, English and German.

=== 18th century ===
==== Heat vs. temperature ====
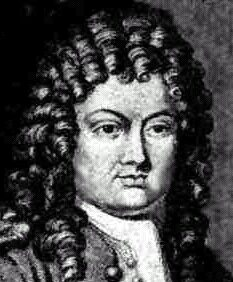
Brook Taylor

Unstated distinctions between heat and "hotness" may be very old, heat seen as something dependent on the quantity of a hot substance, "heat", vaguely perhaps distinct from the quality of "hotness". In 1723, the English mathematician Brook Taylor measured the temperature—the expansion of the liquid in a thermometer—of mixtures of various amounts of hot water in cold water. As expected, the increase in temperature was in proportion to the proportion of hot water in the mixture. The distinction between heat and temperature is implicitly expressed in the last sentence of his report.

I successively fill'd the Vessels with one, two, three, &c. Parts of hot boiling Water, and the rest cold ... And having first observed where the Thermometer stood in cold Water, I found that its rising from that Mark ... was accurately proportional to the Quantity of hot Water in the Mixture, that is, to the Degree of Heat.

==== Evaporative cooling ====
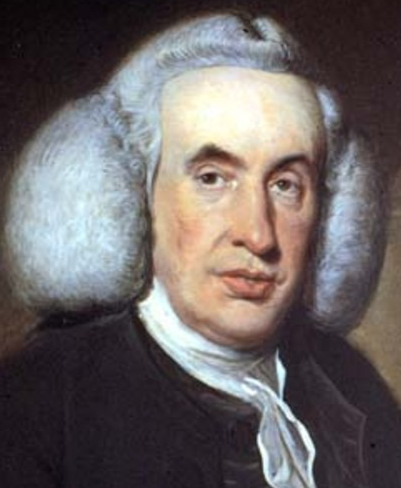
William Cullen

In 1748, an account was published in The Edinburgh Physical and Literary Essays of an experiment by the Scottish physician and chemist William Cullen. Cullen had used an air pump to lower the pressure in a container with diethyl ether. The ether boiled, while no heat was withdrawn from it, and its temperature decreased. And in 1758 on a warm day in Cambridge, England, Benjamin Franklin and fellow scientist John Hadley experimented by continually wetting the ball of a mercury thermometer with ether and using bellows to evaporate the ether. With each subsequent evaporation, the thermometer read a lower temperature, eventually reaching 7 °F (−14 °C).

==== Discovery of specific heat ====
In 1756 or soon thereafter, Joseph Black, Cullen's friend and former assistant, began an extensive study of heat. In 1760 Black realized that when two different substances of equal mass but different temperatures are mixed, the changes in number of degrees in the two substances differ, though the heat gained by the cooler substance and lost by the hotter is the same. Black related an experiment conducted by Daniel Gabriel Fahrenheit on behalf of Dutch physician Herman Boerhaave. For clarity, he then described a hypothetical but realistic variant of the experiment: If equal masses of 100 °F water and 150 °F mercury are mixed, the water temperature increases by 20 ° and the mercury temperature decreases by 30 ° (both arriving at 120 °F), even though the heat gained by the water and lost by the mercury is the same. This clarified the distinction between heat and temperature. It also introduced the concept of specific heat capacity, being different for different substances. Black wrote: "Quicksilver [mercury] ... has less capacity for the matter of heat than water."

==== Degrees of heat ====
In his investigations of specific heat, Black used a unit of heat he called "degrees of heat"—as opposed to just "degrees" [of temperature]. This unit was context-dependent and could only be used when circumstances were identical. It was based on change in temperature multiplied by the mass of the substance involved.

If the stone and water ... were equal in bulk ... the water was heated by 10 degrees, the stone ... cooled 20 degrees; but if ... the stone had only the fiftieth part of the bulk of the water, it must have been ... 1000 degrees hotter before it was plunged into the water than it is now, for otherwise it could not have communicated 10 degrees of heat to ... [the] water.

==== Discovery of latent heat ====
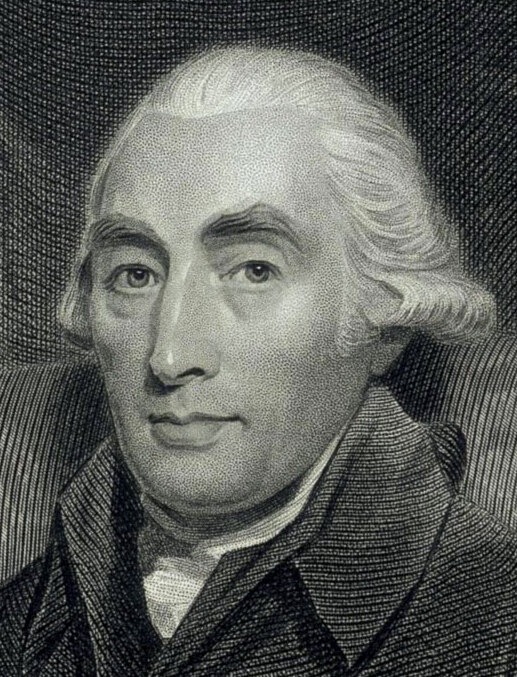
Joseph Black

It was known that when the air temperature rises above freezing—air then becoming the obvious heat source—snow melts very slowly and the temperature of the melted snow is close to its freezing point. In 1757, Black started to investigate if heat, therefore, was required for the melting of a solid, independent of any rise in temperature. As far Black knew, the general view at that time was that melting was inevitably accompanied by a small increase in temperature, and that no additional heat was needed beyond what this increase in temperature would require in itself. Soon, however, Black was able to show that much more heat was required during melting than could be explained by any increase in temperature alone. He was also able to show that heat is released by a liquid during its freezing; again, much more than could be explained by the decrease of its temperature alone.

In 1762, Black announced the following research and results to a society of professors at the University of Glasgow. Black had placed equal masses of ice at 32 °F (0 °C) and water at 33 °F (0.6 °C) respectively in two identical, well separated containers. The water and the ice were both evenly heated to 40 °F by the air in the room, which was at a constant 47 °F (8 °C). The water had therefore received 40 – 33 = 7 "degrees of heat". The ice had been heated for 21 times longer and had therefore received 7 × 21 = 147 "degrees of heat". (Note: These "degrees of heat" were context-dependent and could only be used when circumstances were identical—except for the one differing factor to be investigated. When Black investigated specific heat, the "degrees of heat" were based on change in temperature multiplied by mass. When Black investigated latent heat, they were based on change in temperature multiplied by time passed. Clearly these units were not equivalent.) The temperature of the ice had increased by 8 °F. The ice had thus absorbed 8 "degrees of heat", which Black called sensible heat, manifest as temperature change, which could be felt and measured. In addition to that, 147 – 8 = 139 "degrees of heat" were absorbed as latent heat, manifest as phase change rather than as temperature change.

Black next showed that a water temperature of 176 °F was needed to melt an equal mass of ice until it was all 32 °F. So now 176 – 32 = 144 "degrees of heat" seemed to be needed to melt the ice. The modern value for the heat of fusion of ice would be 143 "degrees of heat" on the same scale (79.5 "degrees of heat Celsius").

Finally, Black increased the temperature of a mass of water, then vaporized an equal mass of water by even heating. He showed that 830 "degrees of heat" was needed for the vaporization; again based on the time required. The modern value for the heat of vaporization of water would be 967 "degrees of heat" on the same scale.

==== First calorimeter ====
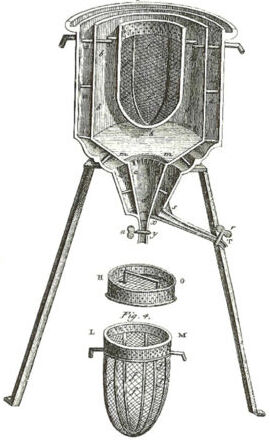
Lavoisier's and Laplace's ice calorimeter

A calorimeter is a device used for measuring heat capacity, as well as the heat absorbed or released in chemical reactions or physical changes. In 1780, French chemist Antoine Lavoisier used such an apparatus—which he named 'calorimeter'—to investigate the heat released by respiration, by observing how this heat melted snow surrounding his apparatus. (Note: "I acknowledge the name of Calorimeter, which I have given it, as derived partly from Greek and partly from Latin, is in some degree open to criticism; but, in matters of science, a slight deviation from strict etymology, for the sake of giving distinctness of idea, is excusable; and I could not derive the name entirely from Greek without approaching too near to the names of known instruments employed for other purposes.") A so called ice calorimeter was used 1782–83 by Lavoisier and his colleague Pierre-Simon Laplace to measure the heat released in various chemical reactions. The heat so released melted a specific amount of ice, and the heat required for the melting of a certain amount of ice was known beforehand.

=== Classical thermodynamics ===
The modern understanding of heat is often partly attributed to Thompson's 1798 mechanical theory of heat ("An Inquiry Concerning the Source of the Heat Which Is Excited by Friction"), postulating a mechanical equivalent of heat. A collaboration between Nicolas Clément and Sadi Carnot (Reflections on the Motive Power of Fire) in the 1820s had some related thinking along similar lines. In 1842, Julius Robert Mayer frictionally generated heat in paper pulp and measured the temperature rise. In 1845, Joule published a paper entitled The Mechanical Equivalent of Heat, in which he specified a numerical value for the amount of mechanical work required to "produce a unit of heat", based on heat production by friction in the passage of electricity through a resistor and in the rotation of a paddle in a vat of water. The theory of classical thermodynamics matured in the 1850s to 1860s.

==== Clausius (1850) ====
In 1850, Clausius, responding to Joule's experimental demonstrations of heat production by friction, rejected the caloric doctrine of conservation of heat, writing:

If we assume that heat, like matter, cannot be lessened in quantity, we must also assume that it cannot be increased; but it is almost impossible to explain the ascension of temperature brought about by friction otherwise than by assuming an actual increase of heat. The careful experiments of Joule, who developed heat in various ways by the application of mechanical force, establish almost to a certainty, not only the possibility of increasing the quantity of heat, but also the fact that the newly-produced heat is proportional to the work expended in its production. It may be remarked further, that many facts have lately transpired which tend to overthrow the hypothesis that heat is itself a body, and to prove that it consists in a motion of the ultimate particles of bodies.

The process function Q was introduced by Rudolf Clausius in 1850. Clausius described it with the German compound Wärmemenge, translated as "amount of heat".

==== James Clerk Maxwell (1871) ====
James Clerk Maxwell in his 1871 Theory of Heat outlines four stipulations for the definition of heat:

- It is something which may be transferred from one body to another, according to the second law of thermodynamics.
- It is a measurable quantity, and so can be treated mathematically.
- It cannot be treated as a material substance, because it may be transformed into something that is not a material substance, e.g., mechanical work.
- Heat is one of the forms of energy.

==== Bryan (1907) ====
In 1907, G.H. Bryan published an investigation of the foundations of thermodynamics, Thermodynamics: an Introductory Treatise dealing mainly with First Principles and their Direct Applications, B.G. Teubner, Leipzig. Bryan was writing when thermodynamics had been established empirically, but people were still interested to specify its logical structure. The 1909 work of Carathéodory also belongs to this historical era. Bryan was a physicist while Carathéodory was a mathematician.

Bryan started his treatise with an introductory chapter on the notions of heat and of temperature. He gives an example of where the notion of heating as raising a body's temperature contradicts the notion of heating as imparting a quantity of heat to that body.

He defined an adiabatic transformation as one in which the body neither gains nor loses heat. This is not the same as defining an adiabatic transformation as one that occurs to a body enclosed by walls impermeable to radiation and conduction.

He recognized calorimetry as a way of measuring quantity of heat. He recognized water as having a temperature of maximum density. This makes water unsuitable as a thermometric substance around that temperature. He intended to remind readers of why thermodynamicists preferred an absolute scale of temperature, independent of the properties of a particular thermometric substance.

His second chapter started with the recognition of friction as a source of heat, by Benjamin Thompson, by Humphry Davy, by Robert Mayer, and by James Prescott Joule.

He stated the First Law of Thermodynamics, or Mayer–Joule Principle as follows:

When heat is transformed into work or conversely work is transformed into heat, the quantity of heat gained or lost is proportional to the quantity of work lost or gained.

He wrote:

If heat be measured in dynamical units the mechanical equivalent becomes equal to unity, and the equations of thermodynamics assume a simpler and more symmetrical form.

He explained how the caloric theory of Lavoisier and Laplace made sense in terms of pure calorimetry, though it failed to account for conversion of work into heat by such mechanisms as friction and conduction of electricity.

Having rationally defined quantity of heat, he went on to consider the second law, including the Kelvin definition of absolute thermodynamic temperature.

On page 34, he wrote:

§41. Physical unreality of reversible processes. In Nature all phenomena are irreversible in a greater or less degree. The motions of celestial bodies afford the closest approximations to reversible motions, but motions which occur on this earth are largely retarded by friction, viscosity, electric and other resistances, and if the relative velocities of moving bodies were reversed, these resistances would still retard the relative motions and would not accelerate them as they should if the motions were perfectly reversible.

In §47, on page 39, he stated the principle of conservation of energy.

In §49, on page 40, he wrote:

In connection with irreversible phenomena the following axioms have to be assumed.
1. If a system can undergo an irreversible change it will do so.
2. A perfectly reversible change cannot take place of itself; such a change can only be regarded as the limiting form of an irreversible change.

In §55, on page 46, thinking of closed systems in thermal connection, he wrote:

We are thus led to postulate a system in which energy can pass from one element to another otherwise than by the performance of mechanical work.

On page 47, still thinking of closed systems in thermal connection, he wrote:

§58. Quantity of Heat. Definition. When energy flows from one system or part of a system to another otherwise than by the performance of work, the energy so transferred i[s] called heat.

On page 48, he wrote:

§ 59. When two bodies act thermically on one another the quantities of heat gained by one and lost by the other are not necessarily equal.
In the case of bodies at a distance, heat may be taken from or given to the intervening medium.
The quantity of heat received by any portion of the ether may be defined in the same way as that received by a material body. [He was thinking of thermal radiation.]
Another important exception occurs when sliding takes place between two rough bodies in contact. The algebraic sum of the works done is different from zero, because, although the action and reaction are equal and opposite the velocities of the parts of the bodies in contact are different. Moreover, the work lost in the process does not increase the mutual potential energy of the system and there is no intervening medium between the bodies. Unless the lost energy can be accounted for in other ways, (as when friction produces electrification), it follows from the Principle of Conservation of Energy that the algebraic sum of the quantities of heat gained by the two systems is equal to the quantity of work lost by friction.

This thought was echoed in some detail in 1941 by Bridgman.

==== Carathéodory (1909) ====
A celebrated and frequent definition of heat in thermodynamics is based on the work of Carathéodory (1909), referring to processes in a closed system. Carathéodory was responding to a suggestion by Max Born that he examine the logical structure of thermodynamics.

The internal energy U_{X} of a body in an arbitrary state X can be determined by amounts of work adiabatically performed by the body on its surroundings when it starts from a reference state O. Such work is assessed through quantities defined in the surroundings of the body. It is supposed that such work can be assessed accurately, without error due to friction in the surroundings; friction in the body is not excluded by this definition. The adiabatic performance of work is defined in terms of adiabatic walls, which allow transfer of energy as work, but no other transfer, of energy or matter. In particular they do not allow the passage of energy as heat. According to this definition, work performed adiabatically is in general accompanied by friction within the thermodynamic system or body. On the other hand, according to Carathéodory (1909), there also exist non-adiabatic, diathermal walls, which are postulated to be permeable only to heat.

For the definition of quantity of energy transferred as heat, it is customarily envisaged that an arbitrary state of interest Y is reached from state O by a process with two components, one adiabatic and the other not adiabatic. For convenience one may say that the adiabatic component was the sum of work done by the body through volume change through movement of the walls while the non-adiabatic wall was temporarily rendered adiabatic, and of isochoric adiabatic work. Then the non-adiabatic component is a process of energy transfer through the wall that passes only heat, newly made accessible for the purpose of this transfer, from the surroundings to the body. The change in internal energy to reach the state Y from the state O is the difference of the two amounts of energy transferred.

Although Carathéodory himself did not state such a definition, following his work it is customary in theoretical studies to define heat, Q, to the body from its surroundings, in the combined process of change to state Y from the state O, as the change in internal energy, ΔU_{Y}, minus the amount of work, W, done by the body on its surrounds by the adiabatic process, so that Q = ΔU_{Y} − W.

In this definition, for the sake of conceptual rigour, the quantity of energy transferred as heat is not specified directly in terms of the non-adiabatic process. It is defined through knowledge of precisely two variables, the change of internal energy and the amount of adiabatic work done, for the combined process of change from the reference state O to the arbitrary state Y. It is important that this does not explicitly involve the amount of energy transferred in the non-adiabatic component of the combined process. It is assumed here that the amount of energy required to pass from state O to state Y, the change of internal energy, is known, independently of the combined process, by a determination through a purely adiabatic process, like that for the determination of the internal energy of state X above. The rigour that is prized in this definition is that there is one and only one kind of energy transfer admitted as fundamental: energy transferred as work. Energy transfer as heat is considered as a derived quantity. The uniqueness of work in this scheme is considered to guarantee rigor and purity of conception. The conceptual purity of this definition, based on the concept of energy transferred as work as an ideal notion, relies on the idea that some frictionless and otherwise non-dissipative processes of energy transfer can be realized in physical actuality. The second law of thermodynamics, on the other hand, assures us that such processes are not found in nature.

Before the rigorous mathematical definition of heat based on Carathéodory's 1909 paper, historically, heat, temperature, and thermal equilibrium were presented in thermodynamics textbooks as jointly primitive notions. Carathéodory introduced his 1909 paper thus: "The proposition that the discipline of thermodynamics can be justified without recourse to any hypothesis that cannot be verified experimentally must be regarded as one of the most noteworthy results of the research in thermodynamics that was accomplished during the last century." Referring to the "point of view adopted by most authors who were active in the last fifty years", Carathéodory wrote: "There exists a physical quantity called heat that is not identical with the mechanical quantities (mass, force, pressure, etc.) and whose variations can be determined by calorimetric measurements." James Serrin introduces an account of the theory of thermodynamics thus: "In the following section, we shall use the classical notions of heat, work, and hotness as primitive elements, ... That heat is an appropriate and natural primitive for thermodynamics was already accepted by Carnot. Its continued validity as a primitive element of thermodynamical structure is due to the fact that it synthesizes an essential physical concept, as well as to its successful use in recent work to unify different constitutive theories." This traditional kind of presentation of the basis of thermodynamics includes ideas that may be summarized by the statement that heat transfer is purely due to spatial non-uniformity of temperature, and is by conduction and radiation, from hotter to colder bodies. It is sometimes proposed that this traditional kind of presentation necessarily rests on "circular reasoning".

This alternative approach to the definition of quantity of energy transferred as heat differs in logical structure from that of Carathéodory, recounted just above.

This alternative approach admits calorimetry as a primary or direct way to measure quantity of energy transferred as heat. It relies on temperature as one of its primitive concepts, and used in calorimetry. It is presupposed that enough processes exist physically to allow measurement of differences in internal energies. Such processes are not restricted to adiabatic transfers of energy as work. They include calorimetry, which is the commonest practical way of finding internal energy differences. The needed temperature can be either empirical or absolute thermodynamic.

In contrast, the Carathéodory way recounted just above does not use calorimetry or temperature in its primary definition of quantity of energy transferred as heat. The Carathéodory way regards calorimetry only as a secondary or indirect way of measuring quantity of energy transferred as heat. As recounted in more detail just above, the Carathéodory way regards quantity of energy transferred as heat in a process as primarily or directly defined as a residual quantity. It is calculated from the difference of the internal energies of the initial and final states of the system, and from the actual work done by the system during the process. That internal energy difference is supposed to have been measured in advance through processes of purely adiabatic transfer of energy as work, processes that take the system between the initial and final states. By the Carathéodory way it is presupposed as known from experiment that there actually physically exist enough such adiabatic processes, so that there need be no recourse to calorimetry for measurement of quantity of energy transferred as heat. This presupposition is essential but is explicitly labeled neither as a law of thermodynamics nor as an axiom of the Carathéodory way. In fact, the actual physical existence of such adiabatic processes is indeed mostly supposition, and those supposed processes have in most cases not been actually verified empirically to exist.

==== Planck (1926) ====
Over the years, for example in his 1879 thesis, but particularly in 1926, Planck advocated regarding the generation of heat by rubbing as the most specific way to define heat. Planck criticised Carathéodory for not attending to this. Carathéodory was a mathematician who liked to think in terms of adiabatic processes, and perhaps found friction too tricky to think about, while Planck was a physicist.

== Heat transfer ==
=== Heat transfer between two bodies ===
Referring to conduction, Partington writes: "If a hot body is brought in conducting contact with a cold body, the temperature of the hot body falls and that of the cold body rises, and it is said that a quantity of heat has passed from the hot body to the cold body."

Referring to radiation, Maxwell writes: "In Radiation, the hotter body loses heat, and the colder body receives heat by means of a process occurring in some intervening medium which does not itself thereby become hot."

Maxwell writes that convection as such "is not a purely thermal phenomenon". In thermodynamics, convection in general is regarded as transport of internal energy. If, however, the convection is enclosed and circulatory, then it may be regarded as an intermediary that transfers energy as heat between source and destination bodies, because it transfers only energy and not matter from the source to the destination body.

In accordance with the first law for closed systems, energy transferred solely as heat leaves one body and enters another, changing the internal energies of each. Transfer, between bodies, of energy as work is a complementary way of changing internal energies. Though it is not logically rigorous from the viewpoint of strict physical concepts, a common form of words that expresses this is to say that heat and work are interconvertible.

Cyclically operating engines that use only heat and work transfers have two thermal reservoirs, a hot and a cold one. They may be classified by the range of operating temperatures of the working body, relative to those reservoirs. In a heat engine, the working body is at all times colder than the hot reservoir and hotter than the cold reservoir. In a sense, it uses heat transfer to produce work. In a heat pump, the working body, at stages of the cycle, goes both hotter than the hot reservoir, and colder than the cold reservoir. In a sense, it uses work to produce heat transfer.

=== Heat engine ===
In classical thermodynamics, a commonly considered model is the heat engine. It consists of four bodies: the working body, the hot reservoir, the cold reservoir, and the work reservoir. A cyclic process leaves the working body in an unchanged state, and is envisaged as being repeated indefinitely often. Work transfers between the working body and the work reservoir are envisaged as reversible, and thus only one work reservoir is needed. But two thermal reservoirs are needed, because transfer of energy as heat is irreversible. A single cycle sees energy taken by the working body from the hot reservoir and sent to the two other reservoirs, the work reservoir and the cold reservoir. The hot reservoir always and only supplies energy, and the cold reservoir always and only receives energy. The second law of thermodynamics requires that no cycle can occur in which no energy is received by the cold reservoir. Heat engines achieve higher efficiency when the ratio of the initial and final temperature is greater.

=== Heat pump or refrigerator ===
Another commonly considered model is the heat pump or refrigerator. Again there are four bodies: the working body, the hot reservoir, the cold reservoir, and the work reservoir. A single cycle starts with the working body colder than the cold reservoir, and then energy is taken in as heat by the working body from the cold reservoir. Then the work reservoir does work on the working body, adding more to its internal energy, making it hotter than the hot reservoir. The hot working body passes heat to the hot reservoir, but still remains hotter than the cold reservoir. Then, by allowing it to expand without passing heat to another body, the working body is made colder than the cold reservoir. It can now accept heat transfer from the cold reservoir to start another cycle.

The device has transported energy from a colder to a hotter reservoir, but this is not regarded as by an inanimate agency; rather, it is regarded as by the harnessing of work. This is because work is supplied from the work reservoir, not just by a simple thermodynamic process, but by a cycle of thermodynamic operations and processes, which may be regarded as directed by an animate or harnessing agency. Accordingly, the cycle is still in accord with the second law of thermodynamics. The 'efficiency' of a heat pump (which exceeds unity) is best when the temperature difference between the hot and cold reservoirs is least.

Functionally, such engines are used in two ways, distinguishing a target reservoir and a resource or surrounding reservoir. A heat pump transfers heat to the hot reservoir as the target from the resource or surrounding reservoir. A refrigerator transfers heat, from the cold reservoir as the target, to the resource or surrounding reservoir. The target reservoir may be regarded as leaking: when the target leaks heat to the surroundings, heat pumping is used; when the target leaks coldness to the surroundings, refrigeration is used. The engines harness work to overcome the leaks.

=== Macroscopic view ===
According to Planck, there are three main conceptual approaches to heat. One is the microscopic or kinetic theory approach. The other two are macroscopic approaches. One of the macroscopic approaches is through the law of conservation of energy taken as prior to thermodynamics, with a mechanical analysis of processes, for example in the work of Helmholtz. This mechanical view is taken in this article as currently customary for thermodynamic theory. The other macroscopic approach is the thermodynamic one, which admits heat as a primitive concept, which contributes, by scientific induction to knowledge of the law of conservation of energy. This view is widely taken as the practical one, quantity of heat being measured by calorimetry.

Bailyn also distinguishes the two macroscopic approaches as the mechanical and the thermodynamic. The thermodynamic view was taken by the founders of thermodynamics in the nineteenth century. It regards quantity of energy transferred as heat as a primitive concept coherent with a primitive concept of temperature, measured primarily by calorimetry. A calorimeter is a body in the surroundings of the system, with its own temperature and internal energy; when it is connected to the system by a path for heat transfer, changes in it measure heat transfer. The mechanical view was pioneered by Helmholtz and developed and used in the twentieth century, largely through the influence of Max Born. It regards quantity of heat transferred as heat as a derived concept, defined for closed systems as quantity of heat transferred by mechanisms other than work transfer, the latter being regarded as primitive for thermodynamics, defined by macroscopic mechanics. According to Born, the transfer of internal energy between open systems that accompanies transfer of matter "cannot be reduced to mechanics". It follows that there is no well-founded definition of quantities of energy transferred as heat or as work associated with transfer of matter.

Nevertheless, for the thermodynamical description of non-equilibrium processes, it is desired to consider the effect of a temperature gradient established by the surroundings across the system of interest when there is no physical barrier or wall between system and surroundings, that is to say, when they are open with respect to one another. The impossibility of a mechanical definition in terms of work for this circumstance does not alter the physical fact that a temperature gradient causes a diffusive flux of internal energy, a process that, in the thermodynamic view, might be proposed as a candidate concept for transfer of energy as heat.

In this circumstance, it may be expected that there may also be active other drivers of diffusive flux of internal energy, such as gradient of chemical potential which drives transfer of matter, and gradient of electric potential which drives electric current and iontophoresis; such effects usually interact with diffusive flux of internal energy driven by temperature gradient, and such interactions are known as cross-effects.

If cross-effects that result in diffusive transfer of internal energy were also labeled as heat transfers, they would sometimes violate the rule that pure heat transfer occurs only down a temperature gradient, never up one. They would also contradict the principle that all heat transfer is of one and the same kind, a principle founded on the idea of heat conduction between closed systems. One might to try to think narrowly of heat flux driven purely by temperature gradient as a conceptual component of diffusive internal energy flux, in the thermodynamic view, the concept resting specifically on careful calculations based on detailed knowledge of the processes and being indirectly assessed. In these circumstances, if perchance it happens that no transfer of matter is actualized, and there are no cross-effects, then the thermodynamic concept and the mechanical concept coincide, as if one were dealing with closed systems. But when there is transfer of matter, the exact laws by which temperature gradient drives diffusive flux of internal energy, rather than being exactly knowable, mostly need to be assumed, and in many cases are practically unverifiable. Consequently, when there is transfer of matter, the calculation of the pure 'heat flux' component of the diffusive flux of internal energy rests on practically unverifiable assumptions. (Note: Denbigh states in a footnote that he is indebted to correspondence with Professor E.A. Guggenheim and with Professor N.K. Adam. From this, Denbigh concludes "It seems, however, that when a system is able to exchange both heat and matter with its environment, it is impossible to make an unambiguous distinction between energy transported as heat and by the migration of matter, without already assuming the existence of the 'heat of transport'." Denbigh K.G. (1951), p. 56.) This is a reason to think of heat as a specialized concept that relates primarily and precisely to closed systems, and applicable only in a very restricted way to open systems.

In many writings in this context, the term "heat flux" is used when what is meant is therefore more accurately called diffusive flux of internal energy; such usage of the term "heat flux" is a residue of older and now obsolete language usage that allowed that a body may have a "heat content".

=== Microscopic view ===
In the kinetic theory, heat is explained in terms of the microscopic motions and interactions of constituent particles, such as electrons, atoms, and molecules. The immediate meaning of the kinetic energy of the constituent particles is not as heat. It is as a component of internal energy. In microscopic terms, heat is a transfer quantity, and is described by a transport theory, not as steadily localized kinetic energy of particles. Heat transfer arises from temperature gradients or differences, through the diffuse exchange of microscopic kinetic and potential particle energy, by particle collisions and other interactions. An early and vague expression of this was made by Francis Bacon. Precise and detailed versions of it were developed in the nineteenth century.

In statistical mechanics, for a closed system (no transfer of matter), heat is the energy transfer associated with a disordered, microscopic action on the system, associated with jumps in occupation numbers of the energy levels of the system, without change in the values of the energy levels themselves. It is possible for macroscopic thermodynamic work to alter the occupation numbers without change in the values of the system energy levels themselves, but what distinguishes transfer as heat is that the transfer is entirely due to disordered, microscopic action, including radiative transfer. A mathematical definition can be formulated for small increments of quasi-static adiabatic work in terms of the statistical distribution of an ensemble of microstates.

=== Calorimetry ===
Quantity of heat transferred can be measured by calorimetry, or determined through calculations based on other quantities.

Calorimetry is the empirical basis of the idea of quantity of heat transferred in a process. The transferred heat is measured by changes in a body of known properties, for example, temperature rise, change in volume or length, or phase change, such as melting of ice.

A calculation of quantity of heat transferred can rely on a hypothetical quantity of energy transferred as adiabatic work and on the first law of thermodynamics. Such calculation is the primary approach of many theoretical studies of quantity of heat transferred.

=== Engineering ===
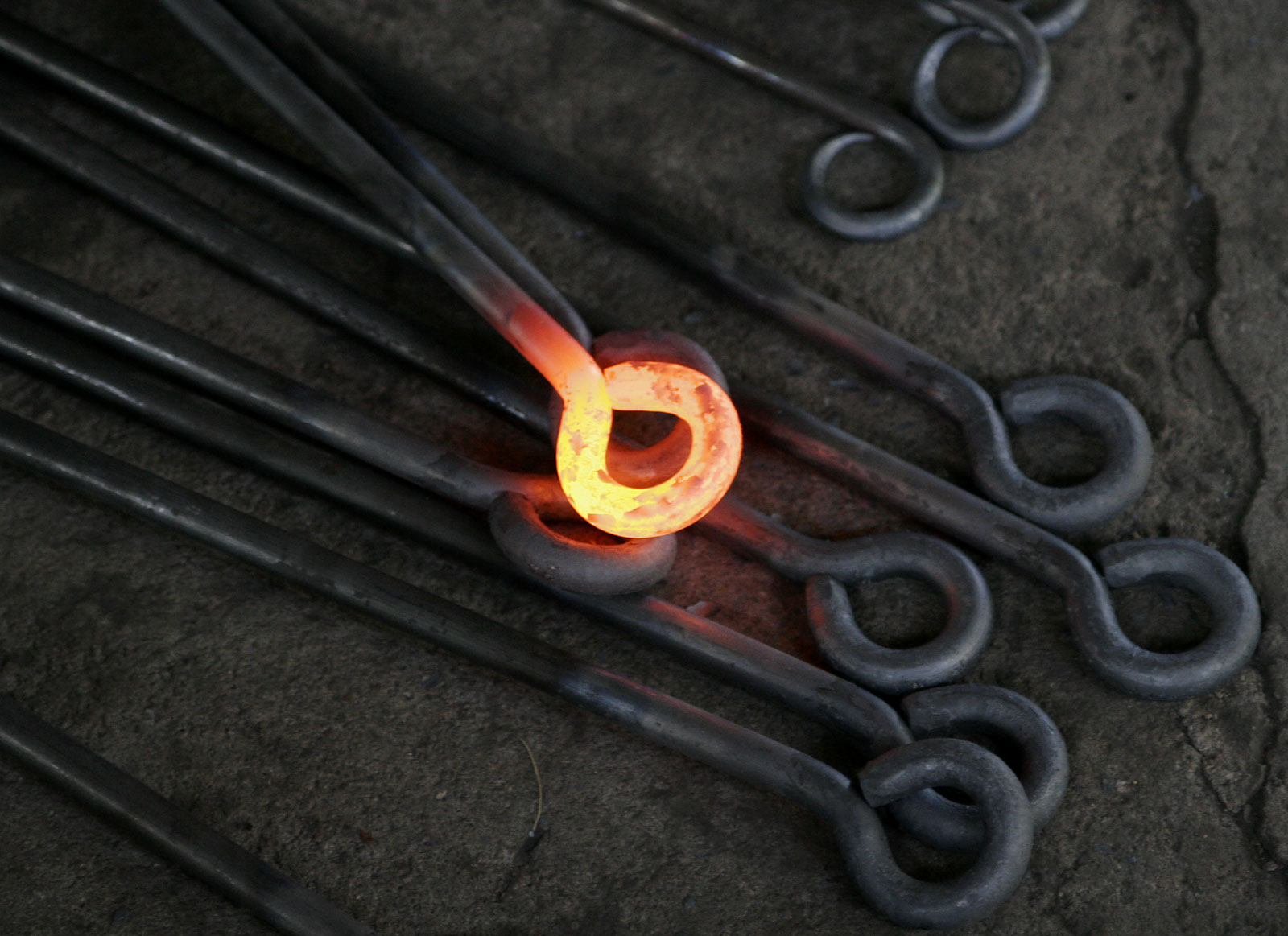
A red-hot iron rod from which heat transfer to the surrounding environment will be primarily through radiation

The discipline of heat transfer, typically considered an aspect of mechanical engineering and chemical engineering, deals with specific applied methods by which thermal energy in a system is generated, or converted, or transferred to another system. Although the definition of heat implicitly means the transfer of energy, the term heat transfer encompasses this traditional usage in many engineering disciplines and laymen language.

Heat transfer is generally described as including the mechanisms of heat conduction, heat convection, thermal radiation, but may include mass transfer and heat in processes of phase changes.

Convection may be described as the combined effects of conduction and fluid flow. From the thermodynamic point of view, heat flows into a fluid by diffusion to increase its energy, the fluid then transfers (advects) this increased internal energy (not heat) from one location to another, and this is then followed by a second thermal interaction which transfers heat to a second body or system, again by diffusion. This entire process is often regarded as an additional mechanism of heat transfer, although technically, "heat transfer" and thus heating and cooling occurs only on either end of such a conductive flow, but not as a result of flow. Thus, conduction can be said to "transfer" heat only as a net result of the process, but may not do so at every time within the complicated convective process.

== Latent and sensible heat ==
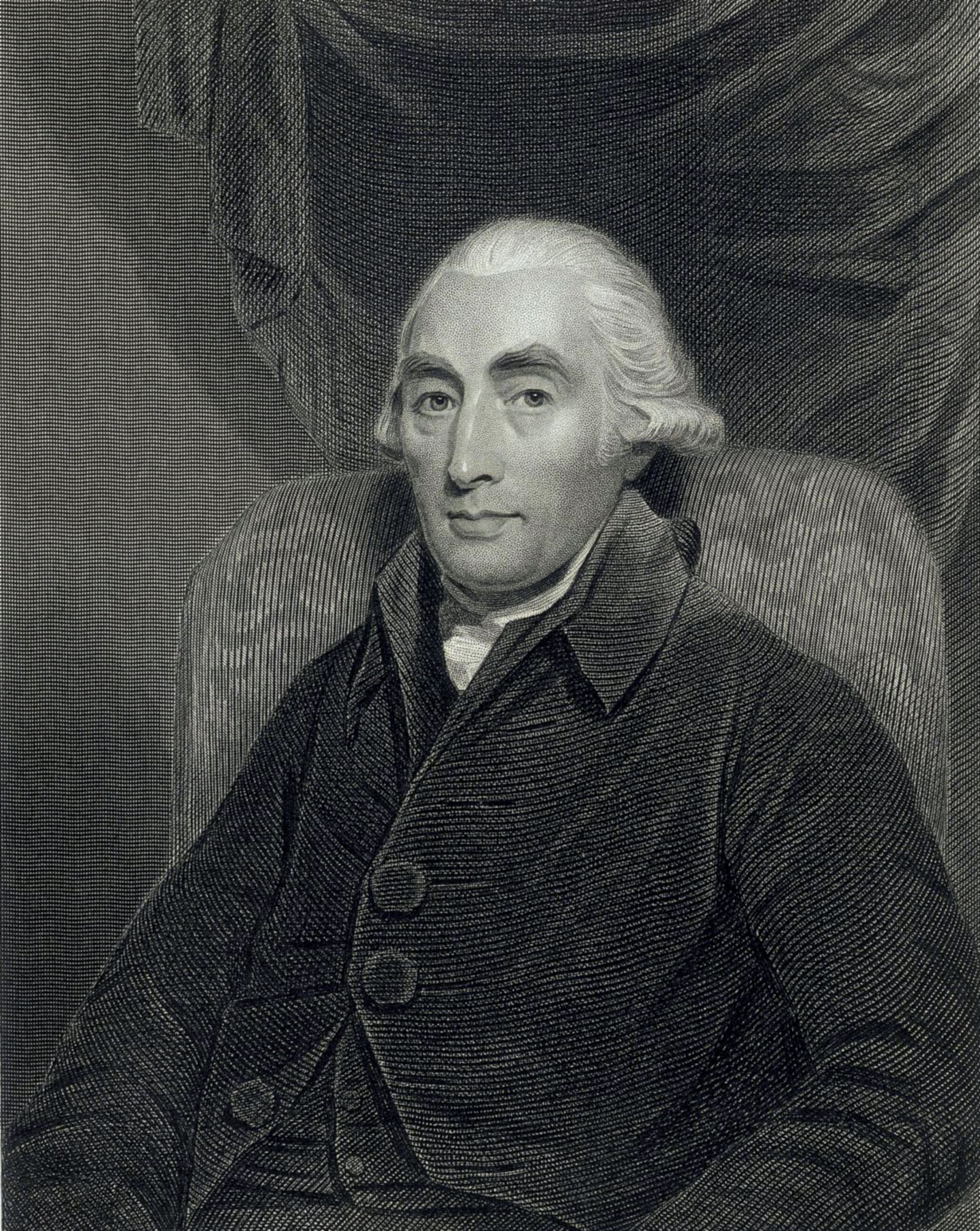
Joseph Black

In an 1847 lecture entitled On Matter, Living Force, and Heat, James Prescott Joule characterized the terms latent heat and sensible heat as components of heat each affecting distinct physical phenomena, namely the potential and kinetic energy of particles, respectively. (Note: "Heat must therefore consist of either living force or of attraction through space. In the former case we can conceive the constituent particles of heated bodies to be, either in whole or in part, in a state of motion. In the latter we may suppose the particles to be removed by the process of heating, so as to exert attraction through greater space. I am inclined to believe that both of these hypotheses will be found to hold good,—that in some instances, particularly in the case of sensible heat, or such as is indicated by the thermometer, heat will be found to consist in the living force of the particles of the bodies in which it is induced; whilst in others, particularly in the case of latent heat, the phenomena are produced by the separation of particle from particle, so as to cause them to attract one another through a greater space." Joule, J.P. (1884).) He described latent energy as the energy possessed via a distancing of particles where attraction was over a greater distance, i.e. a form of potential energy, and the sensible heat as an energy involving the motion of particles, i.e. kinetic energy.

Latent heat is the heat released or absorbed by a chemical substance or a thermodynamic system during a change of state that occurs without a change in temperature. Such a process may be a phase transition, such as the melting of ice or the boiling of water.

== Heat capacity ==
Heat capacity is a measurable physical quantity equal to the ratio of the heat added to an object to the resulting temperature change. The molar heat capacity is the heat capacity per unit amount (SI unit: mole) of a pure substance, and the specific heat capacity, often called simply specific heat, is the heat capacity per unit mass of a material. Heat capacity is a physical property of a substance, which means that it depends on the state and properties of the substance under consideration.

The specific heats of monatomic gases, such as helium, are nearly constant with temperature. Diatomic gases such as hydrogen display some temperature dependence, and triatomic gases (e.g., carbon dioxide) still more.

Before the development of the laws of thermodynamics, heat was measured by changes in the states of the participating bodies.

Some general rules, with important exceptions, can be stated as follows.

In general, most bodies expand on heating. In this circumstance, heating a body at a constant volume increases the pressure it exerts on its constraining walls, while heating at a constant pressure increases its volume.

Beyond this, most substances have three ordinarily recognized states of matter, solid, liquid, and gas. Some can also exist in a plasma. Many have further, more finely differentiated, states of matter, such as glass and liquid crystal. In many cases, at fixed temperature and pressure, a substance can exist in several distinct states of matter in what might be viewed as the same 'body'. For example, ice may float in a glass of water. Then the ice and the water are said to constitute two phases within the 'body'. Definite rules are known, telling how distinct phases may coexist in a 'body'. Mostly, at a fixed pressure, there is a definite temperature at which heating causes a solid to melt or evaporate, and a definite temperature at which heating causes a liquid to evaporate. In such cases, cooling has the reverse effects.

All of these, the commonest cases, fit with a rule that heating can be measured by changes of state of a body. Such cases supply what are called thermometric bodies, that allow the definition of empirical temperatures. Before 1848, all temperatures were defined in this way. There was thus a tight link, apparently logically determined, between heat and temperature, though they were recognized as conceptually thoroughly distinct, especially by Joseph Black in the later eighteenth century.

There are important exceptions. They break the obviously apparent link between heat and temperature. They make it clear that empirical definitions of temperature are contingent on the peculiar properties of particular thermometric substances, and are thus precluded from the title 'absolute'. For example, water contracts on being heated near 277 K. It cannot be used as a thermometric substance near that temperature. Also, over a certain temperature range, ice contracts on heating. Moreover, many substances can exist in metastable states, such as with negative pressure, that survive only transiently and in very special conditions. Such facts, sometimes called 'anomalous', are some of the reasons for the thermodynamic definition of absolute temperature.

In the early days of measurement of high temperatures, another factor was important, and used by Josiah Wedgwood in his pyrometer. The temperature reached in a process was estimated by the shrinkage of a sample of clay. The higher the temperature, the more the shrinkage. This was the only available more or less reliable method of measurement of temperatures above 1000 °C (1,832 °F). But such shrinkage is irreversible. The clay does not expand again on cooling. That is why it could be used for the measurement. But only once. It is not a thermometric material in the usual sense of the word.

Nevertheless, the thermodynamic definition of absolute temperature does make essential use of the concept of heat, with proper circumspection.

== "Hotness" ==
The property of hotness is a concern of thermodynamics that should be defined without reference to the concept of heat. Consideration of hotness leads to the concept of empirical temperature. All physical systems are capable of heating or cooling others. With reference to hotness, the comparative terms hotter and colder are defined by the rule that heat flows from the hotter body to the colder.

If a physical system is inhomogeneous or very rapidly or irregularly changing, for example by turbulence, it may be impossible to characterize it by a temperature, but still there can be transfer of energy as heat between it and another system. If a system has a physical state that is regular enough, and persists long enough to allow it to reach thermal equilibrium with a specified thermometer, then it has a temperature according to that thermometer. An empirical thermometer registers degree of hotness for such a system. Such a temperature is called empirical. For example, Truesdell writes about classical thermodynamics: "At each time, the body is assigned a real number called the temperature. This number is a measure of how hot the body is."

Physical systems that are too turbulent to have temperatures may still differ in hotness. A physical system that passes heat to another physical system is said to be the hotter of the two. More is required for the system to have a thermodynamic temperature. Its behavior must be so regular that its empirical temperature is the same for all suitably calibrated and scaled thermometers, and then its hotness is said to lie on the one-dimensional hotness manifold. This is part of the reason why heat is defined following Carathéodory and Born, solely as occurring other than by work or transfer of matter; temperature is advisedly and deliberately not mentioned in this now widely accepted definition.

This is also the reason that the zeroth law of thermodynamics is stated explicitly. If three physical systems, A, B, and C are each not in their own states of internal thermodynamic equilibrium, it is possible that, with suitable physical connections being made between them, A can heat B and B can heat C and C can heat A. In non-equilibrium situations, cycles of flow are possible. It is the special and uniquely distinguishing characteristic of internal thermodynamic equilibrium that this possibility is not open to thermodynamic systems (as distinguished amongst physical systems) which are in their own states of internal thermodynamic equilibrium; this is the reason why the zeroth law of thermodynamics needs explicit statement. That is to say, the relation 'is not colder than' between general non-equilibrium physical systems is not transitive, whereas, in contrast, the relation 'has no lower a temperature than' between thermodynamic systems in their own states of internal thermodynamic equilibrium is transitive. It follows from this that the relation 'is in thermal equilibrium with' is transitive, which is one way of stating the zeroth law.

Just as temperature may be undefined for a sufficiently inhomogeneous system, so also may entropy be undefined for a system not in its own state of internal thermodynamic equilibrium. For example, 'the temperature of the Solar System' is not a defined quantity. Likewise, 'the entropy of the Solar System' is not defined in classical thermodynamics. It has not been possible to define non-equilibrium entropy, as a simple number for a whole system, in a clearly satisfactory way.

== Classical thermodynamics ==
=== Heat and enthalpy ===
For a closed system (a system from which no matter can enter or exit), one version of the first law of thermodynamics states that the change in internal energy ΔU of the system is equal to the amount of heat Q supplied to the system minus the amount of thermodynamic work W done by system on its surroundings. The foregoing sign convention for work is used in the present article, but an alternate sign convention, followed by IUPAC, for work, is to consider the work performed on the system by its surroundings as positive. This is the convention adopted by many modern textbooks of physical chemistry, such as those by Peter Atkins and Ira Levine, but many textbooks on physics define work as work done by the system.

$$\Delta U = Q - W \, .$$

This formula can be re-written so as to express a definition of quantity of energy transferred as heat, based purely on the concept of adiabatic work, if it is supposed that ΔU is defined and measured solely by processes of adiabatic work:

$$Q = \Delta U + W.$$

The thermodynamic work done by the system is through mechanisms defined by its thermodynamic state variables, for example, its volume V, not through variables that necessarily involve mechanisms in the surroundings. The latter are such as shaft work, and include isochoric work.

The internal energy, U, is a state function. In cyclical processes, such as the operation of a heat engine, state functions of the working substance return to their initial values upon completion of a cycle.

The differential, or infinitesimal increment, for the internal energy in an infinitesimal process is an exact differential dU. The symbol for exact differentials is the lowercase letter d.

In contrast, neither of the infinitesimal increments δQ nor δW in an infinitesimal process represents the change in a state function of the system. Thus, infinitesimal increments of heat and work are inexact differentials. The lowercase Greek letter delta, δ, is the symbol for inexact differentials. The integral of any inexact differential in a process where the system leaves and then returns to the same thermodynamic state does not necessarily equal zero.

As recounted above, in the section headed heat and entropy, the second law of thermodynamics observes that if heat is supplied to a system in a reversible process, the increment of heat δQ and the temperature T form the exact differential

$$\mathrm{d}S =\frac{\delta Q}{T},$$

and that S, the entropy of the working body, is a state function. Likewise, with a well-defined pressure, P, behind a slowly moving (quasistatic) boundary, the work differential, δW, and the pressure, P, combine to form the exact differential

$$\mathrm{d}V =\frac{\delta W}{P},$$

with V the volume of the system, which is a state variable. In general, for systems of uniform pressure and temperature without composition change,
$$\mathrm{d}U = T\mathrm{d}S - P\mathrm{d}V.$$

Associated with this differential equation is the concept that the internal energy may be considered to be a function U (S,V) of its natural variables S and V. The internal energy representation of the fundamental thermodynamic relation is written as
$$U=U(S,V).$$

If V is constant

$$T\mathrm{d}S=\mathrm{d}U\,\,\,\,\,\,\,\,\,\,\,\,(V\,\, \text{constant)}$$

and if P is constant

$$T\mathrm{d}S=\mathrm{d}H\,\,\,\,\,\,\,\,\,\,\,\,(P\,\, \text{constant)}$$

with the enthalpy H defined by

$$H=U+PV.$$

The enthalpy may be considered to be a function H(S, P) of its natural variables S and P. The enthalpy representation of the fundamental thermodynamic relation is written
$$H=H(S,P).$$

The internal energy representation and the enthalpy representation are partial Legendre transforms of one another. They contain the same physical information, written in different ways. Like the internal energy, the enthalpy stated as a function of its natural variables is a thermodynamic potential and contains all thermodynamic information about a body.

If a quantity Q of heat is added to a body while it does only expansion work W on its surroundings, one has

$$\Delta H=\Delta U + \Delta(PV)\,.$$

If this is constrained to happen at constant pressure, i.e. with ΔP = 0, the expansion work W done by the body is given by W = P ΔV; recalling the first law of thermodynamics, one has

$$\Delta U=Q - W=Q - P\, \Delta V \text{   and   }\Delta (PV) = P\, \Delta V \,.$$

Consequently, by substitution one has

$$\begin{align}
\Delta H &= Q - P\, \Delta V + P\, \Delta V \\
&=Q\qquad\qquad\,\,\,\,\,\,\,\,\,\,\,\,\,\,\,\,\,\,\,\, \text{at constant pressure without electrical work.}
\end{align}$$

In this scenario, the increase in enthalpy is equal to the quantity of heat added to the system. This is the basis of the determination of enthalpy changes in chemical reactions by calorimetry. Since many processes do take place at constant atmospheric pressure, the enthalpy is sometimes given the misleading name of 'heat content' or heat function, while it actually depends strongly on the energies of covalent bonds and intermolecular forces.

In terms of the natural variables S and P of the state function H, this process of change of state from state 1 to state 2 can be expressed as

$$\begin{align}
\Delta H &= \int_{S_1}^{S_2} \left(\frac{\partial H}{\partial S}\right)_P \mathrm dS +\int_{P_1}^{P_2} \left(\frac{\partial H}{\partial P}\right)_S \mathrm dP \\
&=\int_{S_1}^{S_2} \left(\frac{\partial H}{\partial S}\right)_P \mathrm dS\,\,\,\,\,\,\,\,\,\,\,\,\,\,\, \text{at constant pressure without electrical work.}
\end{align}$$

It is known that the temperature T(S, P) is identically stated by

$$\left(\frac{\partial H}{\partial S}\right)_P \equiv T(S,P)\,.$$

Consequently,

$$\Delta H=\int_{S_1}^{S_2} T(S,P) \mathrm dS\,\,\,\,\,\,\,\,\,\,\,\,\,\,\,\,\,\,\,\, \text{at constant pressure without electrical work.}$$

In this case, the integral specifies a quantity of heat transferred at constant pressure.

=== Heat and entropy ===
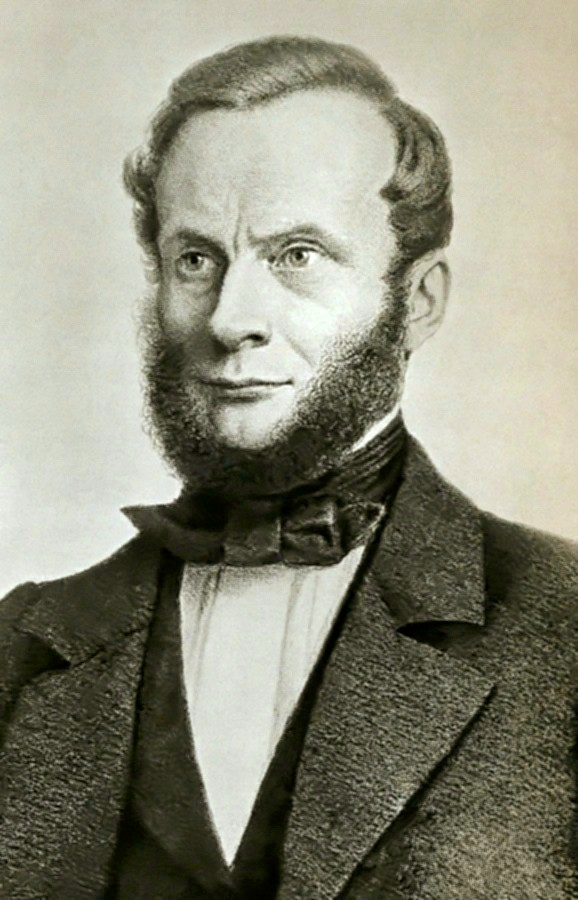
Rudolf Clausius

In 1856, Rudolf Clausius, referring to closed systems, in which transfers of matter do not occur, defined the second fundamental theorem (the second law of thermodynamics) in the mechanical theory of heat (thermodynamics): "if two transformations which, without necessitating any other permanent change, can mutually replace one another, be called equivalent, then the generations of the quantity of heat Q from work at the temperature T, has the equivalence-value:"

$$\frac {Q}{T}.$$

In 1865, he came to define the entropy symbolized by S, such that, due to the supply of the amount of heat Q at temperature T the entropy of the system is increased by

$\Delta S = \frac {Q}{T}$	1

In a transfer of energy as heat without work being done, there are changes of entropy in both the surroundings which lose heat and the system which gains it. The increase, ΔS, of entropy in the system may be considered to consist of two parts, an increment, ΔS′ that matches, or 'compensates', the change, −ΔS′, of entropy in the surroundings, and a further increment, ΔS′′ that may be considered to be 'generated' or 'produced' in the system, and is said therefore to be 'uncompensated'. Thus

$$\Delta S = \Delta S' +\Delta S'' .$$

This may also be written

$$\Delta S_{\mathrm{system}} = \Delta S_{\mathrm{compensated}}+\Delta S_{\mathrm{uncompensated}}\,\,\,\,\text{with}\,\,\,\,\Delta S_{\mathrm{compensated}}=-\Delta S_{\mathrm{surroundings}}.$$

The total change of entropy in the system and surroundings is thus

$$\Delta S_{\mathrm{overall}} = \Delta S^\prime+\Delta S^{\prime\prime}-\Delta S^\prime=\Delta S^{\prime\prime} .$$

This may also be written

$$\Delta S_{\mathrm{overall}} = \Delta S_{\mathrm{compensated}}+\Delta S_{\mathrm{uncompensated}}+\Delta S_{\mathrm{surroundings}}=\Delta S_{\mathrm{uncompensated}} .$$

It is then said that an amount of entropy ΔS′ has been transferred from the surroundings to the system. Because entropy is not a conserved quantity, this is an exception to the general way of speaking, in which an amount transferred is of a conserved quantity.

From the second law of thermodynamics it follows that in a spontaneous transfer of heat, in which the temperature of the system is different from that of the surroundings:

$$\Delta S_{\mathrm{overall}} > 0 .$$

For purposes of mathematical analysis of transfers, one thinks of fictive processes that are called reversible, with the temperature T of the system being hardly less than that of the surroundings, and the transfer taking place at an imperceptibly slow rate.

Following the definition above in formula (1), for such a fictive reversible process, a quantity of transferred heat δQ (an inexact differential) is analyzed as a quantity T dS, with dS (an exact differential):

$$T\,\mathrm{d}S=\delta Q .$$

This equality is only valid for a fictive transfer in which there is no production of entropy, that is to say, in which there is no uncompensated entropy.

If, in contrast, the process is natural, and can really occur, with irreversibility, then there is entropy production, with dS_{uncompensated} > 0. The quantity T dS_{uncompensated} was termed by Clausius the "uncompensated heat", though that does not accord with present-day terminology. Then one has

$$T_{surr}\,\mathrm{d}S=\delta Q+T\,\mathrm{d}S_{\mathrm{uncompensated}} > \delta Q .$$

This leads to the statement

$$T_{surr}\,\mathrm{d}S \geq \delta Q \quad \text{(second law)}\,.$$
which is the second law of thermodynamics for closed systems.

In non-equilibrium thermodynamics that makes the approximation of assuming the hypothesis of local thermodynamic equilibrium, there is a special notation for this. The transfer of energy as heat is assumed to take place across an infinitesimal temperature difference, so that the system element and its surroundings have near enough the same temperature T. Then one writes

$$\mathrm{d}S = \mathrm{d}S_{\mathrm e} + \mathrm{d}S_{\mathrm i}\,,$$

where by definition

$$\delta Q = T\,\mathrm{d}S_{\mathrm e}\,\,\,\,\,\text{and}\,\,\,\,\,\mathrm{d}S_{\mathrm i}\equiv\mathrm{d}S_{\mathrm {uncompensated}}.$$

The second law for a natural process asserts that
$$\mathrm d S_{\mathrm i} > 0 .$$

== See also ==
- Effect of sun angle on climate
- Heat death of the Universe
- Heat diffusion
- Heat equation
- Heat exchanger
- Heat flux sensor
- Heat recovery steam generator
- Heat recovery ventilation
- Heat transfer coefficient
- Heat wave
- History of heat
- Orders of magnitude (temperature)
- Relativistic heat conduction
- Renewable heat
- Sigma heat
- Thermal energy storage
- Thermal management of electronic devices and systems
- Thermometer
- Waste heat
- Waste heat recovery unit
- Water heat recycling
