= Apparent temperature =

Temperature as perceived by humans

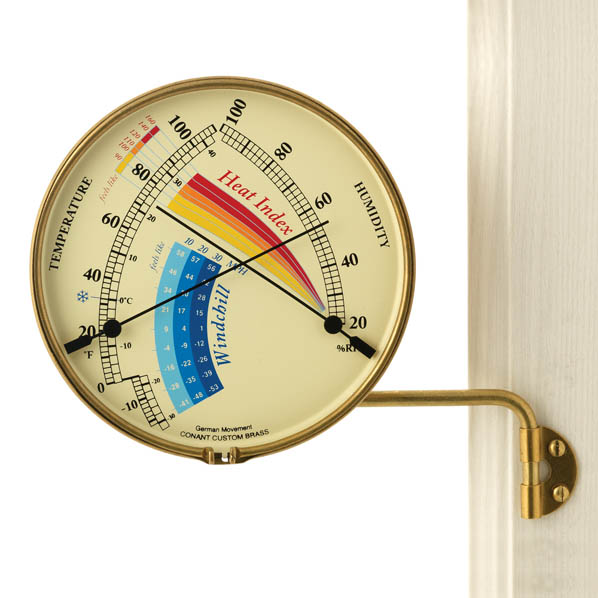
- Instrument face indicating the value of the heat index at the intersection of its two hands (indicating temperature and relative humidity), with a chart showing windchill according to the temperature (indicated) and wind speed (acquired by some other method)
- Dimension: Index calculated to be similar to a temperature

Apparent temperature, also known as "feels like", is the temperature equivalent perceived by humans, caused by the combined effects of air temperature, relative humidity and wind speed. The measure is most commonly applied to the perceived outdoor temperature. Apparent temperature was invented by Robert G. Steadman who published a paper about it in 1984. It also applies, however, to indoor temperatures, especially saunas, and when houses and workplaces are not sufficiently heated or cooled.

- The heat index and humidex measure the effect of humidity on the perception of temperatures above +27 °C (81 °F). In humid conditions, the air feels much hotter, because less perspiration evaporates from the skin.
- The wind chill factor measures the effect of wind speed on cooling of the human body below 10 °C (50 °F). As airflow increases over the skin, more heat will be removed. Standard models and conditions are used.
- The wet-bulb globe temperature (WBGT) combines the effects of radiation (typically sunlight), humidity, temperature and wind speed on the perception of temperature. It is not often used, since its measurement requires the use of a globe thermometer exposed to the sun, which is not included in standard meteorological equipment used in official weather conditions reporting (nor are, in most cases, any other explicit means of measuring solar radiation; temperature measurement takes place entirely in a shade box to avoid direct solar effects). It also does not have an explicit relationship with the perceived temperature a person feels; when used for practical purposes, the WBGT is linked to a category system to estimate the threat of heat-related illness.

Since there is no direct measurement of solar radiation in U.S. observation systems, and solar radiation can add up to 15 °F (8.3 °C) to the apparent temperature, commercial weather companies have attempted to develop their own proprietary apparent temperature systems, including The Weather Company's "FeelsLike" and AccuWeather's "RealFeel". These systems, while their exact mechanisms are trade secrets, are believed to estimate the effect of solar radiation based on the available meteorological data that is reported (such as UV index and cloud cover).

== Australian apparent temperature ==
The Australian apparent temperature (AT), invented in the late 1970s, was designed to measure thermal sensation in indoor conditions. It was extended in the early 1980s to include the effect of sun and wind. The AT index used here is based on a mathematical model of an adult, walking outdoors, in the shade (Steadman 1984). The AT is defined as the temperature, at the reference humidity level, producing the same amount of discomfort as that experienced under the current ambient temperature and humidity.

The formula is:

$$\mathrm{AT} = T_\mathrm{a} + 0.33e - 0.7v - 4.00,$$

where:

- T_{a} is dry-bulb temperature (°C)
- e is water vapour pressure (hPa)
- v is wind speed (m/s) at an elevation of 10 m (33 ft)

The vapour pressure can be calculated from the temperature and relative humidity using the equation:
$$e = \frac\mathrm{RH}{100} \cdot 6.105 \cdot \exp {\left(\frac{17.27 \cdot T_\mathrm{a}}{237.7 + T_\mathrm{a}}\right)},$$

where:

- T_{a} is dry-bulb temperature (°C)
- RH is relative humidity (%)
- exp represents the exponential function

The Australian formula includes the important factor of humidity and is somewhat more involved than the simpler North American wind chill model. The North American formula was designed to be applied at low temperatures (as low as −46 °C or −50 °F) when humidity levels are also low. The hot-weather version of the AT (1984) is used by the National Weather Service in the United States. In the United States, this simple version of the AT is known as the heat index.

== See also ==
- Equivalent temperature
- Thermal comfort § Interplay of temperature and humidity
