= Thermal comfort =

Satisfaction with the thermal environment

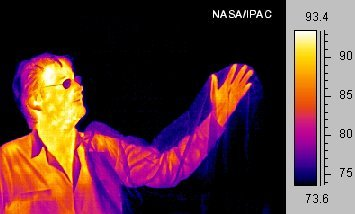
A thermal image of a clothed human

Thermal comfort is the condition of mind that expresses subjective satisfaction with the thermal environment. The human body can be viewed as a heat engine where food is the input energy. The human body will release excess heat into the environment, so the body can continue to operate. The heat transfer is proportional to temperature difference. In cold environments, more heat is released than the body generates, and in hot environments, the body cannot release enough heat. Both the hot and cold scenarios lead to discomfort. Maintaining this standard of thermal comfort for occupants of buildings or other enclosures is one of the important goals of HVAC (heating, ventilation, and air conditioning) design engineers.

Typical comfort zones during winter and summer seasons.

Thermal neutrality is maintained when the heat generated by human metabolism is allowed to dissipate, thus maintaining thermal equilibrium with the surroundings. The main factors that influence thermal neutrality are those that determine heat gain and loss, namely metabolic rate, clothing insulation, air temperature, mean radiant temperature, air speed and relative humidity. Psychological parameters, such as individual expectations, and physiological parameters also affect thermal neutrality. Neutral temperature is the temperature that can lead to thermal neutrality and it may vary greatly between individuals and depending on factors such as activity level, clothing, and humidity. People are highly sensitive to even small differences in environmental temperature. At 24 °C (75.2 °F), a difference of 0.38 °C (0.684 °F) can be detected between the temperature of two rooms.

The Predicted Mean Vote (PMV) model stands among the most recognized thermal comfort models. It was developed using principles of heat balance and experimental data collected in a controlled climate chamber under steady state conditions. The adaptive model, on the other hand, was developed based on hundreds of field studies with the idea that occupants dynamically interact with their environment. Occupants control their thermal environment by means of clothing, operable windows, fans, personal heaters, and sun shades. The PMV model can be applied to air-conditioned buildings, while the adaptive model can be applied only to buildings where no mechanical systems have been installed. There is no consensus about which comfort model should be applied for buildings that are partially air-conditioned spatially or temporally.

Thermal comfort calculations in accordance with the ANSI/ASHRAE Standard 55, the ISO 7730 Standard and the EN 16798-1 Standard can be freely performed with either the CBE Thermal Comfort Tool for ASHRAE 55, with the Python package pythermalcomfort or with the R package comf.

== Significance ==
Satisfaction with the thermal environment is important because thermal conditions are potentially life-threatening for humans if the core body temperature reaches conditions of hyperthermia, above 37.5–38.3 °C (99.5–100.9 °F), or hypothermia, below 35.0 °C (95.0 °F). Buildings modify the conditions of the external environment and reduce the effort that the human body needs to do in order to stay stable at a normal human body temperature, important for the correct functioning of human physiological processes.

The Roman writer Vitruvius actually linked this purpose to the birth of architecture. David Linden also suggests that the reason why we associate tropical beaches with paradise is because in those environments is where human bodies need to do less metabolic effort to maintain their core temperature. Temperature not only supports human life; coolness and warmth have also become in different cultures a symbol of protection, community and even the sacred.

In building science studies, thermal comfort has been related to productivity and health. Office workers who are satisfied with their thermal environment are more productive. The combination of high temperature and high relative humidity reduces thermal comfort and indoor air quality.

Although a single static temperature can be comfortable, people are attracted by thermal changes, such as campfires and cool pools. Thermal pleasure is caused by varying thermal sensations from a state of unpleasantness to a state of pleasantness, and the scientific term for it is positive thermal alliesthesia. From a state of thermal neutrality or comfort any change will be perceived as unpleasant. This challenges the assumption that mechanically controlled buildings should deliver uniform temperatures and comfort, if it is at the cost of excluding thermal pleasure.

== Influencing factors ==
Since there are large variations from person to person in terms of physiological and psychological satisfaction, it is hard to find an optimal temperature for everyone in a given space. Laboratory and field data have been collected to define conditions that will be found comfortable for a specified percentage of occupants.

There are numerous factors that directly affect thermal comfort that can be grouped in two categories:

1. Personal factors – characteristics of the occupants such as metabolic rate and clothing level
2. Environmental factors – which are conditions of the thermal environment, specifically air temperature, mean radiant temperature, air speed and humidity

Even if all these factors may vary with time, standards usually refer to a steady state to study thermal comfort, just allowing limited temperature variations.

=== Personal factors ===
==== Metabolic rate ====
People have different metabolic rates that can fluctuate due to activity level and environmental conditions. ASHRAE 55-2017 defines metabolic rate as the rate of transformation of chemical energy into heat and mechanical work by metabolic activities of an individual, per unit of skin surface area.

Metabolic rate is expressed in units of met, equal to 58.2 W/m^{2} (18.4 Btu/h·ft^{2}). One met is equal to the energy produced per unit surface area of an average person seated at rest.

ASHRAE 55 provides a table of metabolic rates for a variety of activities. Some common values are 0.7 met for sleeping, 1.0 met for a seated and quiet position, 1.2–1.4 met for light activities standing, 2.0 met or more for activities that involve movement, walking, lifting heavy loads or operating machinery. For intermittent activity, the standard states that it is permissible to use a time-weighted average metabolic rate if individuals are performing activities that vary over a period of one hour or less. For longer periods, different metabolic rates must be considered.

According to ASHRAE Handbook of Fundamentals, estimating metabolic rates is complex, and for levels above 2 or 3 met – especially if there are various ways of performing such activities – the accuracy is low. Therefore, the standard is not applicable for activities with an average level higher than 2 met. Met values can also be determined more accurately than the tabulated ones, using an empirical equation that takes into account the rate of respiratory oxygen consumption and carbon dioxide production. Another physiological yet less accurate method is related to the heart rate, since there is a relationship between the latter and oxygen consumption.

The Compendium of Physical Activities is used by physicians to record physical activities. It has a different definition of met that is the ratio of the metabolic rate of the activity in question to a resting metabolic rate. As the formulation of the concept is different from the one that ASHRAE uses, these met values cannot be used directly in PMV calculations, but it opens up a new way of quantifying physical activities.

Food and drink habits may have an influence on metabolic rates, which indirectly influences thermal preferences. These effects may change depending on food and drink intake.

Body shape is another factor that affects metabolic rate and hence thermal comfort. Heat dissipation depends on body surface area. The surface area of an average person is 1.8 m^{2} (19 ft^{2}). A tall and skinny person has a larger surface-to-volume ratio, can dissipate heat more easily, and can tolerate higher temperatures more than a person with a rounded body shape.

==== Clothing insulation ====
The amount of thermal insulation worn by a person has a substantial impact on thermal comfort, because it influences the heat loss and consequently the thermal balance. Layers of insulating clothing prevent heat loss and can either help keep a person warm or lead to overheating. Generally, the thicker the garment is, the greater insulating ability it has. Depending on the type of material the clothing is made out of, air movement and relative humidity can decrease the insulating ability of the material.

1 clo is equal to 0.155 m^{2}·K/W (0.88 °F·ft^{2}·h/Btu). This corresponds to trousers, a long sleeved shirt, and a jacket. Clothing insulation values for other common ensembles or single garments can be found in ASHRAE 55.

===== Skin wetness =====
Skin wetness is defined as "the proportion of the total skin surface area of the body covered with sweat". The wetness of skin in different areas also affects perceived thermal comfort. Humidity can increase wetness in different areas of the body, leading to a perception of discomfort. This is usually localized in different parts of the body, and local thermal comfort limits for skin wetness differ by locations of the body. The extremities are much more sensitive to thermal discomfort from wetness than the trunk of the body. Although local thermal discomfort can be caused by wetness, the thermal comfort of the whole body will not be affected by the wetness of certain parts.

=== Environmental factors ===
==== Air temperature ====
The air temperature is the average temperature of the air surrounding the occupant, with respect to location and time. According to ASHRAE 55 standard, the spatial average takes into account the ankle, waist and head levels, which vary for seated or standing occupants. The temporal average is based on three-minutes intervals with at least 18 equally spaced points in time. Air temperature is measured with a dry-bulb thermometer and for this reason it is also known as dry-bulb temperature.

==== Mean radiant temperature ====
Transfer of light and heat in a room.

The radiant temperature is related to the amount of radiant heat transferred from a surface, and it depends on the material's ability to absorb or emit heat, or its emissivity. The mean radiant temperature depends on the temperatures and emissivities of the surrounding surfaces as well as the view factor, or the amount of the surface that is "seen" by the object. So the mean radiant temperature experienced by a person in a room with the sunlight streaming in varies based on how much of their body is in the sun.

==== Air speed ====
Air speed is defined as the rate of air movement at a point, without regard to direction. According to ANSI/ASHRAE Standard 55, it is the average speed of the air surrounding a representative occupant, with respect to location and time. The spatial average is for three heights as defined for average air temperature. For an occupant moving in a space the sensors shall follow the movements of the occupant. The air speed is averaged over an interval not less than one and not greater than three minutes. Variations that occur over a period greater than three minutes shall be treated as multiple different air speeds.

==== Relative humidity ====
Relative humidity (RH) is the ratio of the amount of water vapor in the air to the amount of water vapor that the air could hold at the specific temperature and pressure. While the human body has thermoreceptors in the skin that enable perception of temperature, relative humidity is detected indirectly. Sweating is an effective heat loss mechanism that relies on evaporation from the skin. However at high RH, the air has close to the maximum water vapor that it can hold, so evaporation, and therefore heat loss, is decreased. On the other hand, very dry environments (RH < 20–30%) are also uncomfortable because of their effect on the mucous membranes. The recommended level of indoor humidity is in the range of 30–60% in air conditioned buildings, but new standards such as the adaptive model allow lower and higher humidity, depending on the other factors involved in thermal comfort.

Recently, the effects of low relative humidity and high air velocity were tested on humans after bathing. Researchers found that low relative humidity engendered thermal discomfort as well as the sensation of dryness and itching. It is recommended to keep relative humidity levels higher in a bathroom than other rooms in the house for optimal conditions.

Various types of apparent temperature have been developed to combine air temperature and air humidity. For higher temperatures, there are quantitative scales, such as the heat index. For lower temperatures, a related interplay was identified only qualitatively:

- High humidity and low temperatures cause the air to feel chilly.
- Cold air with high relative humidity "feels" colder than dry air of the same temperature because high humidity in cold weather increases the conduction of heat from the body.

There has been controversy over why damp cold air feels colder than dry cold air. Some believe it is because when the humidity is high, our skin and clothing become moist and are better conductors of heat, so there is more cooling by conduction.

The influence of humidity can be exacerbated with the combined use of fans (forced convection cooling).

==== Natural ventilation ====
Many buildings use an HVAC unit to control their thermal environment. Other buildings are naturally ventilated (or would have cross ventilation) and do not rely on mechanical systems to provide thermal comfort. Depending on the climate, this can drastically reduce energy consumption. It is sometimes seen as a risk, though, since indoor temperatures can be too extreme if the building is poorly designed. Properly designed, naturally ventilated buildings keep indoor conditions within the range where opening windows and using fans in the summer, and wearing extra clothing in the winter, can keep people thermally comfortable.

== Models and indices ==
There are several different models or indices that can be used to assess thermal comfort conditions indoors as described below.

=== PMV/PPD method ===
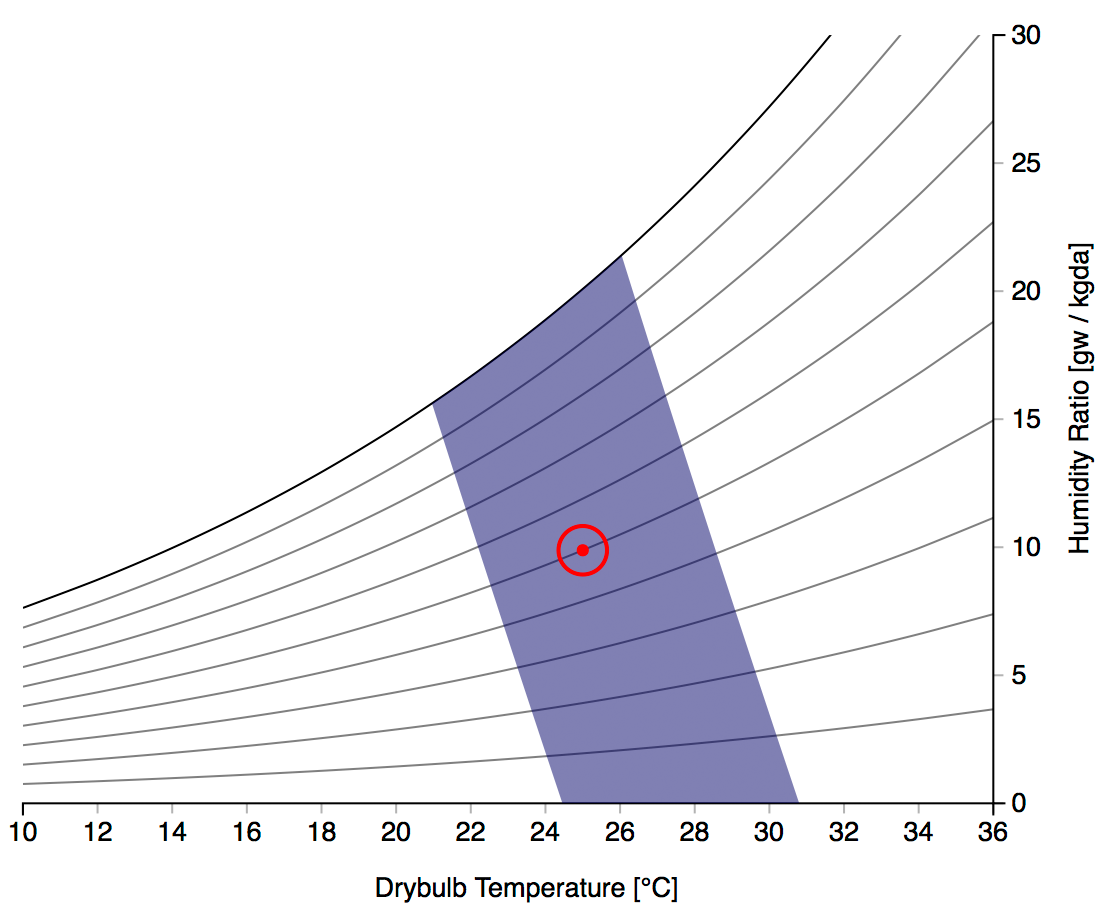
Psychrometric Chart

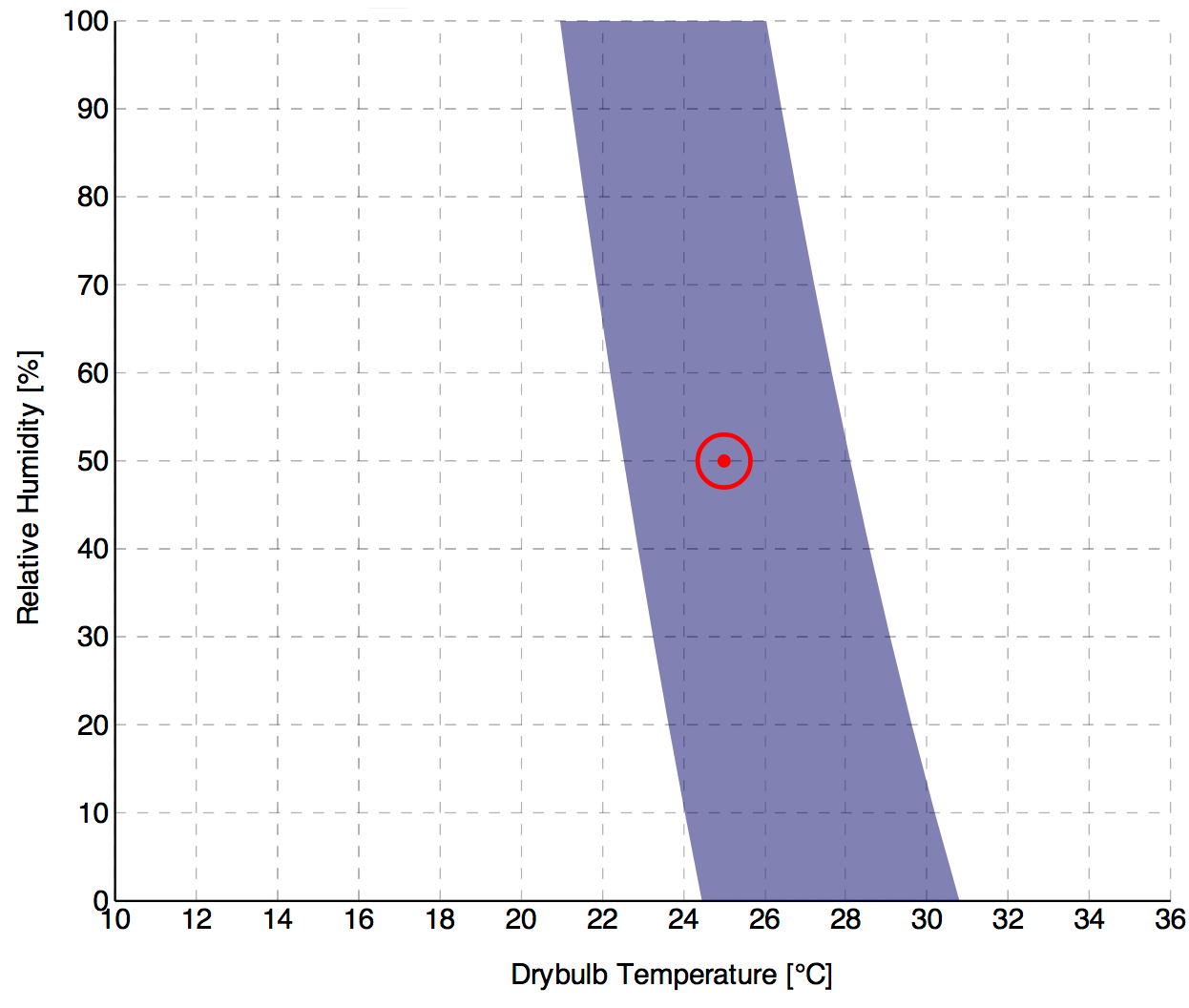
Temperature-relative humidity chart

Two alternative representations of thermal comfort for the PMV/PPD method

The PMV/PPD model was developed by P.O. Fanger using heat-balance equations and empirical studies about skin temperature to define comfort. Standard thermal comfort surveys ask subjects about their thermal sensation on a seven-point scale from cold (−3) to hot (+3). Fanger's equations are used to calculate the predicted mean vote (PMV) of a group of subjects for a particular combination of air temperature, mean radiant temperature, relative humidity, air speed, metabolic rate, and clothing insulation. PMV equal to zero is representing thermal neutrality, and the comfort zone is defined by the combinations of the six parameters for which the PMV is within the recommended limits (−0.5 < PMV < +0.5). Although predicting the thermal sensation of a population is an important step in determining what conditions are comfortable, it is more useful to consider whether or not people will be satisfied. Fanger developed another equation to relate the PMV to the Predicted Percentage of Dissatisfied (PPD). This relation was based on studies that surveyed subjects in a chamber where the indoor conditions could be precisely controlled.

The PMV/PPD model is applied globally but does not directly take into account the adaptation mechanisms and outdoor thermal conditions.

ASHRAE Standard 55-2017 uses the PMV model to set the requirements for indoor thermal conditions. It requires that at least 80% of the occupants be satisfied.

The CBE Thermal Comfort Tool for ASHRAE 55 allows users to input the six comfort parameters to determine whether a certain combination complies with ASHRAE 55. The results are displayed on a psychrometric or a temperature-relative humidity chart and indicate the ranges of temperature and relative humidity that will be comfortable with the given the values input for the remaining four parameters.

The PMV/PPD model has a low prediction accuracy. Using the world largest thermal comfort field survey database, the accuracy of PMV in predicting occupant's thermal sensation was only 34%, meaning that the thermal sensation is correctly predicted one out of three times. The PPD was overestimating subject's thermal unacceptability outside the thermal neutrality ranges (-1≤PMV≤1). The PMV/PPD accuracy varies strongly between ventilation strategies, building types and climates.

==== Elevated air speed method ====
ASHRAE 55 2013 accounts for air speeds above 0.2 metres per second (0.66 ft/s) separately than the baseline model. Because air movement can provide direct cooling to people, particularly if they are not wearing much clothing, higher temperatures can be more comfortable than the PMV model predicts. Air speeds up to 0.8 m/s (2.6 ft/s) are allowed without local control, and 1.2 m/s is possible with local control. This elevated air movement increases the maximum temperature for an office space in the summer to 30 °C from 27.5 °C (86.0–81.5 °F).

==== Virtual Energy for Thermal Comfort ====
"Virtual Energy for Thermal Comfort" is the amount of energy that will be required to make a non-air-conditioned building relatively as comfortable as one with air-conditioning. This is based on the assumption that the home will eventually install air-conditioning or heating. Passive design improves thermal comfort in a building, thus reducing demand for heating or cooling. In many developing countries, however, most occupants do not currently heat or cool, due to economic constraints, as well as climate conditions which border lines comfort conditions such as cold winter nights in Johannesburg (South Africa) or warm summer days in San Jose, Costa Rica. At the same time, as incomes rise, there is a strong tendency to introduce cooling and heating systems. If we recognize and reward passive design features that improve thermal comfort today, we diminish the risk of having to install HVAC systems in the future, or we at least ensure that such systems will be smaller and less frequently used. Or in case the heating or cooling system is not installed due to high cost, at least people should not suffer from discomfort indoors. To provide an example, in San Jose, Costa Rica, if a house were being designed with high level of glazing and small opening sizes, the internal temperature would easily rise above 30 °C (86 °F) and natural ventilation would not be enough to remove the internal heat gains and solar gains. This is why Virtual Energy for Comfort is important.

World Bank's assessment tool the EDGE software (Excellence in Design for Greater Efficiencies) illustrates the potential issues with discomfort in buildings and has created the concept of Virtual Energy for Comfort which provides for a way to present potential thermal discomfort. This approach is used to award for design solutions which improves thermal comfort even in a fully free running building. Despite the inclusion of requirements for overheating in CIBSE, overcooling has not been assessed. However, overcooling can be an issue, mainly in the developing world, for example in cities such as Lima (Peru), Bogota, and Delhi, where cooler indoor temperatures can occur frequently. This may be a new area for research and design guidance for reduction of discomfort.

==== Cooling Effect ====
ASHRAE 55-2017 defines the Cooling Effect (CE) at elevated air speed (above 0.2 metres per second (0.66 ft/s)) as the value that, when subtracted from both the air temperature and the mean radiant temperature, yields the same SET value under still air (0.1 m/s) as in the first SET calculation under elevated air speed.

$$SET(t_{a}, t_{r}, v, met, clo, RH) = SET(t_{a} - CE, t_{r} - CE, v = 0.1, met, clo, RH)$$

The CE can be used to determine the PMV adjusted for an environment with elevated air speed using the adjusted temperature, the adjusted radiant temperature and still air (0.2 metres per second (0.66 ft/s)). Where the adjusted temperatures are equal to the original air and mean radiant temperatures minus the CE.

=== Local thermal discomfort ===
Avoiding local thermal discomfort, whether caused by a vertical air temperature difference between the feet and the head, by an asymmetric radiant field, by local convective cooling (draft), or by contact with a hot or cold floor, is essential to providing acceptable thermal comfort. People are generally more sensitive to local discomfort when their thermal sensation is cooler than neutral, while they are less sensitive to it when their body is warmer than neutral.

==== Radiant temperature asymmetry ====
Large differences in the thermal radiation of the surfaces surrounding a person may cause local discomfort or reduce acceptance of the thermal conditions. ASHRAE Standard 55 sets limits on the allowable temperature differences between various surfaces. Because people are more sensitive to some asymmetries than others, for example that of a warm ceiling versus that of hot and cold vertical surfaces, the limits depend on which surfaces are involved. The ceiling is not allowed to be more than +5 °C (9.0 °F) warmer, whereas a wall may be up to +23 °C (41 °F) warmer than the other surfaces.

==== Draft ====
While air movement can be pleasant and provide comfort in some circumstances, it is sometimes unwanted and causes discomfort. This unwanted air movement is called "draft" and is most prevalent when the thermal sensation of the whole body is cool. People are most likely to feel a draft on uncovered body parts such as their head, neck, shoulders, ankles, feet, and legs, but the sensation also depends on the air speed, air temperature, activity, and clothing.

Draft at the ankles is a particular concern in buildings with displacement ventilation or underfloor air distribution. These systems supply air at or near floor level, where it can pass over occupants’ feet and lower legs. Earlier research on draft focused on the neck. Fanger and colleagues developed a draft model in 1988 that estimates the percentage dissatisfied with local cooling at the neck, termed the draft rate (DR), using air temperature, mean air speed, and turbulence intensity.

A 2016 chamber study examined whether existing draft criteria adequately represented discomfort at exposed ankles. Thirty women with uncovered lower legs and feet experienced nine combinations of ankle-level air speed and temperature. Across the conditions, 23%–57% rated ankle air movement unacceptable. The researchers reported that these rates exceeded those suggested by existing draft criteria.

A follow-up study combined these data with additional chamber tests involving covered and uncovered lower legs. Ankle-level air speed and whole-body thermal sensation were the strongest predictors of dissatisfaction and formed the basis of an ankle-specific model. Its output, the predicted percentage dissatisfied with ankle draft (PPDAD), estimates the proportion of occupants expected to find ankle air movement unacceptable.

These studies informed the ankle-draft assessment introduced in a 2018 addendum to ASHRAE Standard 55-2017. The assessment uses ankle-level air speed and whole-body thermal sensation to evaluate discomfort specifically at the ankles. Standard 55-2023 sets an air speed limit at 0.1 m above the floor corresponding to predicted dissatisfaction below 20%, with lower allowable speeds when occupants are predicted to feel cooler overall.

==== Floor surface temperature ====
Floors that are too warm or too cool may cause discomfort, depending on footwear. ASHRAE 55 recommends that floor temperatures stay in the range of 19–29 °C (66–84 °F) in spaces where occupants will be wearing lightweight shoes.

=== Standard effective temperature ===
Standard effective temperature (SET) is a model of human response to the thermal environment. Developed by A.P. Gagge and accepted by ASHRAE in 1986, it is also referred to as the Pierce Two-Node model. Its calculation is similar to PMV because it is a comprehensive comfort index based on heat-balance equations that incorporates the personal factors of clothing and metabolic rate. Its fundamental difference is it takes a two-node method to represent human physiology in measuring skin temperature and skin wettedness.

The SET index is defined as the equivalent dry bulb temperature of an isothermal environment at 50% relative humidity in which a subject, while wearing clothing standardized for activity concerned, would have the same heat stress (skin temperature) and thermoregulatory strain (skin wettedness) as in the actual test environment.

Research has tested the model against experimental data and found it tends to overestimate skin temperature and underestimate skin wettedness. Fountain and Huizenga (1997) developed a thermal sensation prediction tool that computes SET. The SET index can also be calculated using either the CBE Thermal Comfort Tool for ASHRAE 55, the Python package pythermalcomfort, or the R package comf.

=== Adaptive comfort model ===
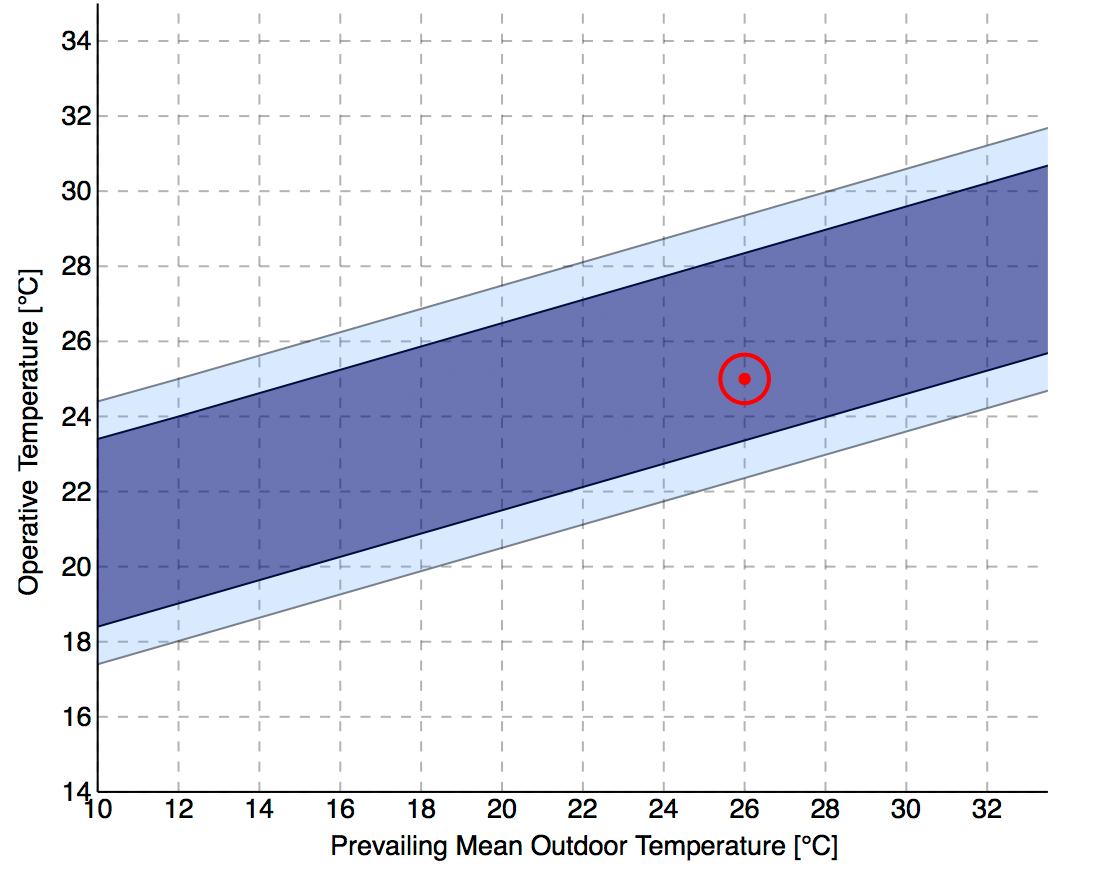
Adaptive chart according to ASHRAE Standard 55-2010

The adaptive model is based on the idea that outdoor climate might be used as a proxy of indoor comfort because of a statistically significant correlation between them. The adaptive hypothesis predicts that contextual factors, such as having access to environmental controls, and past thermal history can influence building occupants' thermal expectations and preferences. Numerous researchers have conducted field studies worldwide in which they survey building occupants about their thermal comfort while taking simultaneous environmental measurements. Analyzing a database of results from 160 of these buildings revealed that occupants of naturally ventilated buildings accept and even prefer a wider range of temperatures than their counterparts in sealed, air-conditioned buildings because their preferred temperature depends on outdoor conditions. These results were incorporated in the ASHRAE 55-2004 standard as the adaptive comfort model. The adaptive chart relates indoor comfort temperature to prevailing outdoor temperature and defines zones of 80% and 90% satisfaction.

The ASHRAE-55 2010 Standard introduced the prevailing mean outdoor temperature as the input variable for the adaptive model. It is based on the arithmetic average of the mean daily outdoor temperatures over no fewer than 7 and no more than 30 sequential days prior to the day in question. It can also be calculated by weighting the temperatures with different coefficients, assigning increasing importance to the most recent temperatures. In case this weighting is used, there is no need to respect the upper limit for the subsequent days. In order to apply the adaptive model, there should be no mechanical cooling system for the space, occupants should be engaged in sedentary activities with metabolic rates of 1–1.3 met, and a prevailing mean temperature of 10–33.5 °C (50.0–92.3 °F).

This model applies especially to occupant-controlled, natural-conditioned spaces, where the outdoor climate can actually affect the indoor conditions and so the comfort zone. In fact, studies by de Dear and Brager showed that occupants in naturally ventilated buildings were tolerant of a wider range of temperatures. This is due to both behavioral and physiological adjustments, since there are different types of adaptive processes. ASHRAE Standard 55-2010 states that differences in recent thermal experiences, changes in clothing, availability of control options, and shifts in occupant expectations can change people's thermal responses.

Adaptive models of thermal comfort are implemented in other standards, such as European EN 15251 and ISO 7730 standard. While the exact derivation methods and results are slightly different from the ASHRAE 55 adaptive standard, they are substantially the same. A larger difference is in applicability. The ASHRAE adaptive standard only applies to buildings without mechanical cooling installed, while EN15251 can be applied to mixed-mode buildings, provided the system is not running.

There are basically three categories of thermal adaptation, namely: behavioral, physiological, and psychological.

==== Psychological adaptation ====
An individual's comfort level in a given environment may change and adapt over time due to psychological factors. Subjective perception of thermal comfort may be influenced by the memory of previous experiences. Habituation takes place when repeated exposure moderates future expectations, and responses to sensory input. This is an important factor in explaining the difference between field observations and PMV predictions (based on the static model) in naturally ventilated buildings. In these buildings, the relationship with the outdoor temperatures has been twice as strong as predicted.

Psychological adaptation is subtly different in the static and adaptive models. Laboratory tests of the static model can identify and quantify non-heat transfer (psychological) factors that affect reported comfort. The adaptive model is limited to reporting differences (called psychological) between modeled and reported comfort.

Thermal comfort as a "condition of mind" is defined in psychological terms. Among the factors that affect the condition of mind (in the laboratory) are a sense of control over the temperature, knowledge of the temperature and the appearance of the (test) environment. A thermal test chamber that appeared residential "felt" warmer than one which looked like the inside of a refrigerator.

==== Physiological adaptation ====
The body has several thermal adjustment mechanisms to survive in drastic temperature environments. In a cold environment the body utilizes vasoconstriction; which reduces blood flow to the skin, skin temperature and heat dissipation. In a warm environment, vasodilation will increase blood flow to the skin, heat transport, and skin temperature and heat dissipation. If there is an imbalance despite the vasomotor adjustments listed above, in a warm environment sweat production will start and provide evaporative cooling. If this is insufficient, hyperthermia will set in, body temperature may reach 40 °C (104 °F), and heat stroke may occur. In a cold environment, shivering will start, involuntarily forcing the muscles to work and increasing the heat production by up to a factor of 10. If equilibrium is not restored, hypothermia can set in, which can be fatal. Long-term adjustments to extreme temperatures, of a few days to six months, may result in cardiovascular and endocrine adjustments. A hot climate may create increased blood volume, improving the effectiveness of vasodilation, enhanced performance of the sweat mechanism, and the readjustment of thermal preferences. In cold or underheated conditions, vasoconstriction can become permanent, resulting in decreased blood volume and increased body metabolic rate.

==== Behavioral adaptation ====
In naturally ventilated buildings, occupants take numerous actions to keep themselves comfortable when the indoor conditions drift towards discomfort. Operating windows and fans, adjusting blinds/shades, changing clothing, and consuming food and drinks are some of the common adaptive strategies. Among these, adjusting windows is the most common. Those occupants who take these sorts of actions tend to feel cooler at warmer temperatures than those who do not.

The behavioral actions significantly influence energy simulation inputs, and researchers are developing behavior models to improve the accuracy of simulation results. For example, there are many window-opening models that have been developed to date, but there is no consensus over the factors that trigger window opening.

People might adapt to seasonal heat by becoming more nocturnal, doing physical activity and even conducting business at night.

== Specificity and sensitivity ==
=== Individual differences ===
The thermal sensitivity of an individual is quantified by the descriptor F_{S}, which takes on higher values for individuals with lower tolerance to non-ideal thermal conditions. This group includes pregnant women, the disabled, as well as individuals whose age is below fourteen or above sixty, which is considered the adult range. Existing literature provides consistent evidence that sensitivity to hot and cold surfaces usually declines with age. There is also some evidence of a gradual reduction in the effectiveness of the body in thermo-regulation after the age of sixty. This is mainly due to a more sluggish response of the counteraction mechanisms in lower parts of the body that are used to maintain the core temperature of the body at ideal values. Seniors prefer warmer temperatures than young adults (76 vs 72 degrees F or 24.4 vs 22.2 Celsius).

Situational factors include the health, psychological, sociological, and vocational activities of the persons.

=== Biological sex differences ===
While thermal comfort preferences between sexes seem to be small, there are some average differences. Studies have found males on average report discomfort due to rises in temperature much earlier than females. Males on average also estimate higher levels of their sensation of discomfort than females. One recent study tested males and females in the same cotton clothing, performing mental jobs while using a dial vote to report their thermal comfort to the changing temperature. Many times, females preferred higher temperatures than males. But while females tend to be more sensitive to temperatures, males tend to be more sensitive to relative-humidity levels.

An extensive field study was carried out in naturally ventilated residential buildings in Kota Kinabalu, Sabah, Malaysia. This investigation explored the sexes thermal sensitivity to the indoor environment in non-air-conditioned residential buildings. Multiple hierarchical regression for categorical moderator was selected for data analysis; the result showed that as a group females were slightly more sensitive than males to the indoor air temperatures, whereas, under thermal neutrality, it was found that males and females have similar thermal sensation.

=== Regional differences ===
In different areas of the world, thermal comfort needs may vary based on climate. In China the climate has hot humid summers and cold winters, causing a need for efficient thermal comfort. Energy conservation in relation to thermal comfort has become a large issue in China in the last several decades due to rapid economic and population growth. Researchers are now looking into ways to heat and cool buildings in China for lower costs and also with less harm to the environment.

In tropical areas of Brazil, urbanization is creating urban heat islands (UHI). These are urban areas that have risen over the thermal comfort limits due to a large influx of people and only drop within the comfortable range during the rainy season. Urban heat islands can occur over any urban city or built-up area with the correct conditions.

In the hot, humid region of Saudi Arabia, the issue of thermal comfort has been important in mosques; because they are very large open buildings that are used only intermittently (very busy for the noon prayer on Fridays) it is hard to ventilate them properly. The large size requires a large amount of ventilation, which requires a lot of energy since the buildings are used only for short periods of time. Temperature regulation in mosques is a challenge due to the intermittent demand, leading to many mosques being either too hot or too cold. The stack effect also comes into play due to their large size and creates a large layer of hot air above the people in the mosque. New designs have placed the ventilation systems lower in the buildings to provide more temperature control at ground level. New monitoring steps are also being taken to improve efficiency.

== Thermal stress ==
The concept of thermal comfort is closely related to thermal stress. This attempts to predict the impact of solar radiation, air movement, and humidity for military personnel undergoing training exercises or athletes during competitive events. Several thermal stress indices have been proposed, such as the Predicted Heat Strain (PHS) or the humidex. Generally, humans do not perform well under thermal stress. People's performances under thermal stress is about 11% lower than their performance at normal thermal wet conditions. Also, human performance in relation to thermal stress varies greatly by the type of task which the individual is completing. Some of the physiological effects of thermal heat stress include increased blood flow to the skin, sweating, and increased ventilation.

=== Predicted Heat Strain (PHS) ===
The PHS model, developed by the International Organization for Standardization (ISO) committee, allows the analytical evaluation of the thermal stress experienced by a working subject in a hot environment. It describes a method for predicting the sweat rate and the internal core temperature that the human body will develop in response to the working conditions. The PHS is calculated as a function of several physical parameters, consequently it makes it possible to determine which parameter or group of parameters should be modified, and to what extent, in order to reduce the risk of physiological strains. The PHS model does not predict the physiological response of an individual subject, but only considers standard subjects in good health and fit for the work they perform. The PHS can be determined using either the Python package pythermalcomfort or the R package comf.

=== American Conference on Governmental Industrial Hygienists (ACGIH) Action Limits and Threshold Limit Values ===
ACGIH has established Action Limits and Threshold Limit Values for heat stress based upon the estimated metabolic rate of a worker and the environmental conditions the worker is subjected to.

This methodology has been adopted by the Occupational Safety and Health Administration (OSHA) as an effective method of assessing heat stress within workplaces.

== Research ==
The factors affecting thermal comfort were explored experimentally in the 1970s. Many of these studies led to the development and refinement of ASHRAE Standard 55 and were performed at Kansas State University by Ole Fanger and others. Perceived comfort was found to be a complex interaction of these variables. It was found that the majority of individuals would be satisfied by an ideal set of values. As the range of values deviated progressively from the ideal, fewer and fewer people were satisfied. This observation could be expressed statistically as the percent of individuals who expressed satisfaction by comfort conditions and the predicted mean vote (PMV). This approach was challenged by the adaptive comfort model, developed from the ASHRAE 884 project, which revealed that occupants were comfortable in a broader range of temperatures.

This research is applied to create Building Energy Simulation (BES) programs for residential buildings. Residential buildings in particular can vary much more in thermal comfort than public and commercial buildings. This is due to their smaller size, the variations in clothing worn, and different uses of each room. The main rooms of concern are bathrooms and bedrooms. Bathrooms need to be at a temperature comfortable for a human with or without clothing. Bedrooms are of importance because they need to accommodate different levels of clothing and also different metabolic rates of people asleep or awake. Discomfort hours is a common metric used to evaluate the thermal performance of a space.

Thermal comfort research in clothing is currently being done by the military. New air-ventilated garments are being researched to improve evaporative cooling in military settings. Some models are being created and tested based on the amount of cooling they provide.

In the last twenty years, researchers have also developed advanced thermal comfort models that divide the human body into many segments, and predict local thermal discomfort by considering heat balance. This has opened up a new arena of thermal comfort modeling that aims at heating/cooling selected body parts.

Another area of study is the hue-heat hypothesis that states that an environment with warm colors (red, orange yellow hues) will feel warmer in terms of temperature and comfort, while an environment with cold colors (blue, green hues) will feel cooler. The hue-heat hypothesis has both been investigated scientifically and ingrained in popular culture in the terms warm and cold colors

=== Medical environments ===
Whenever the studies referenced tried to discuss the thermal conditions for different groups of occupants in one room, the studies ended up simply presenting comparisons of thermal comfort satisfaction based on the subjective studies. No study tried to reconcile the different thermal comfort requirements of different types of occupants who compulsorily must stay in one room. Therefore, it looks to be necessary to investigate the different thermal conditions required by different groups of occupants in hospitals to reconcile their different requirements in this concept. To reconcile the differences in the required thermal comfort conditions it is recommended to test the possibility of using different ranges of local radiant temperature in one room via a suitable mechanical system.

Although different researches are undertaken on thermal comfort for patients in hospitals, it is also necessary to study the effects of thermal comfort conditions on the quality and the quantity of healing for patients in hospitals. There are also original researches that show the link between thermal comfort for staff and their levels of productivity, but no studies have been produced individually in hospitals in this field. Therefore, research for coverage and methods individually for this subject is recommended. Also research in terms of cooling and heating delivery systems for patients with low levels of immune-system protection (such as HIV patients, burned patients, etc.) are recommended. There are important areas, which still need to be focused on including thermal comfort for staff and its relation with their productivity, using different heating systems to prevent hypothermia in the patient and to improve the thermal comfort for hospital staff simultaneously.

Finally, the interaction between people, systems and architectural design in hospitals is a field in which require further work needed to improve the knowledge of how to design buildings and systems to reconcile many conflicting factors for the people occupying these buildings.

=== Personal comfort systems ===
Personal comfort systems (PCS) refer to devices or systems which heat or cool a building occupant personally. This concept is best appreciated in contrast to central HVAC systems which have uniform temperature settings for extensive areas. Personal comfort systems include fans and air diffusers of various kinds (e.g. desk fans, nozzles and slot diffusers, overhead fans, high-volume low-speed fans etc.) and personalized sources of radiant or conductive heat (footwarmers, legwarmers, hot water bottles etc.). PCS has the potential to satisfy individual comfort requirements much better than current HVAC systems, as interpersonal differences in thermal sensation due to age, sex, body mass, metabolic rate, clothing and thermal adaptation can amount to an equivalent temperature variation of 2–5 °C (3.6–9 °F), which is impossible for a central, uniform HVAC system to cater to. Besides, research has shown that the perceived ability to control one's thermal environment tends to widen one's range of tolerable temperatures. Traditionally, PCS devices have been used in isolation from one another. However, it has been proposed by Andersen et al. (2016) that a network of PCS devices which generate well-connected microzones of thermal comfort, and report real-time occupant information and respond to programmatic actuation requests (e.g. a party, a conference, a concert etc.) can combine with occupant-aware building applications to enable new methods of comfort maximization.

=== Thermal comfort during sleep ===
Humans spend around a third of our lifetimes sleeping, and poor sleep quality can inhibit the typical restorative benefits of sleep. Research shows that skin temperatures and thermal comfort during sleep measurably affect sleep quality, and that thermal comfort requirements while asleep are distinct from those while awake. Due to a reduced metabolic rate and increased heat loss from inactivity, core body temperature gradually decreases throughout the night and rises again shortly before waking in the morning, in accordance with the natural circadian rhythm. Additionally, humans’ capacity for thermoregulation is greatly reduced during sleep, particularly during rapid eye movement (REM) sleep, creating greater vulnerability to heat stress at night.

Several guidelines exist for recommended bedroom temperatures. CIBSE Guide A recommends a temperature range of 17–19 °C (63–67 °F) in winter and 23–25 °C (73–77 °F) in summer. The US National Sleep Foundation recommends 15–19 °C (60–67 °F), while the National Institute for Occupational Safety and Health recommends 18–20 °C (65–68 °F). In the research literature, there is no universally accepted range for the ambient thermoneutral temperature, i.e., “the point at which ambient air temperature allows for optimal maintenance of core and skin temperature”. This is largely due to the wide range of local climates, bedding systems, and sleeping habits worldwide. Findings indicate that this range falls around 17–28 °C (63–82 °F), and it has been shown that temperatures outside this thermoneutral zone increase nighttime waking in individuals. While relative humidity is not addressed in the guidelines from the organizations previously mentioned, research shows that it exacerbates the effect of high temperatures and is recommended to be maintained between 40–60%.

In particular, the bed microclimate can differ significantly from the ambient environment due to the insulating layers separating the body from the room air. Establishing stable and appropriate ambient temperatures and bedding microclimates will support healthier sleep patterns and enhance sleep quality. Lastly, there is potential to reduce energy consumption in addition to thermal discomfort by accurately defining the thermoneutral zone for sleeping people and reducing over-heating and/or over-cooling in bedrooms.

== See also ==
- ASHRAE
- ANSI/ASHRAE Standard 55
- Air conditioning
- Building insulation
- Cold and heat adaptations in humans
- Heat stress
- Mean radiant temperature
- Mahoney tables
- Povl Ole Fanger
- Psychrometrics
- Ralph G. Nevins
- Room air distribution
- Room temperature
- Ventilative cooling
