= Climate of Quebec City =

The climate in Quebec City has a continental climate with no dry season and a warm summer (Köppen: Dfb). It is fairly wet, at 47 inches of precipitation a year.

== Temperature ==
Average daily temperatures in Quebec City range from -12.8 °C (9.0 °F) in January to 19.3 °C (66.7 °F) in July. The average annual mean temperature is 4.2 °C (39.6 °F). On average, there are 171 days per year with temperatures below freezing. The average number of days in June, July, and August exceeding a threshold Humidex (i.e., humidity index – a heat-stress indicator combining temperature and dew point) value of 30 ("noticeable discomfort") were 6.3, 13.3, and 10.6, respectively, for the 1991–2020 period. A Humidex value of 35 ("evident discomfort") was exceeded on average on 1.8, 3.9, and 2.1 days during those months.

=== Averages ===
Climate data for Quebec/Jean Lesage International Airport
Month	Jan	Feb	Mar	Apr	May	Jun	Jul	Aug	Sep	Oct	Nov	Dec	Year
Mean daily maximum °C (°F)	−7.9 (17.8)	−5.6 (21.9)	0.2 (32.4)	8.3 (46.9)	17.0 (62.6)	22.3 (72.1)	25.9 (78.6)	24.6 (76.3)	18.9 (66.0)	11.1 (52.0)	2.9 (37.2)	−4.2 (24.4)	9.5 (49.0)
Daily mean °C (°F)	−12.8 (9.0)	−10.6 (12.9)	−4.6 (23.7)	3.7 (38.7)	11.2 (52.2)	16.4 (61.5)	19.3 (66.7)	18.1 (64.6)	12.7 (54.9)	6.6 (43.9)	−0.7 (30.7)	−8.6 (16.5)	4.2 (39.6)
Mean daily minimum °C (°F)	−17.7 (0.1)	−15.6 (3.9)	−9.4 (15.1)	−1.0 (30.2)	5.4 (41.7)	10.5 (50.9)	13.5 (56.3)	12.5 (54.5)	7.5 (45.5)	2.0 (35.6)	−4.2 (24.4)	−12.8 (9.0)	−0.8 (30.6)

=== Average monthly maxima and minima ===
Climate data for Quebec City (average absolute daily highs and lows)
Month	Jan	Feb	Mar	Apr	May	Jun	Jul	Aug	Sep	Oct	Nov	Dec	Year
Mean maximum °C (°F)	6.4 (43.5)	8.5 (47.3)	10.6 (51.1)	21.6 (70.9)	27.4 (81.3)	29.8 (85.6)	30.9 (87.6)	30.0 (86.0)	28.3 (82.9)	20.1 (68.2)	15.9 (60.6)	7.1 (44.8)	32.0 (89.6)
Mean minimum °C (°F)	−27.8 (−18.0)	−27.7 (−17.9)	−23.6 (−10.5)	−10.6 (12.9)	−0.5 (31.1)	4.9 (40.8)	8.0 (46.4)	6.5 (43.7)	0.0 (32.0)	−4.3 (24.3)	−14.0 (6.8)	−23.8 (−10.8)	−29.7 (−21.5)

=== Extremes ===
Climate data for Quebec City (extremes)
Month	Jan	Feb	Mar	Apr	May	Jun	Jul	Aug	Sep	Oct	Nov	Dec	Year
Record high °C (°F)	10.0 (50.0)	11.7 (53.1)	17.8 (64.0)	29.9 (85.8)	33.0 (91.4)	33.9 (93.0)	35.6 (96.1)	34.4 (93.9)	33.9 (93.0)	28.3 (82.9)	20.0 (68.0)	13.9 (57.0)	35.6 (96.1)
Record low °C (°F)	−35.4 (−31.7)	−36.1 (−33.0)	−30.0 (−22.0)	−18.9 (−2.0)	−7.8 (18.0)	−0.6 (30.9)	3.9 (39.0)	2.2 (36.0)	−4.8 (23.4)	−10.0 (14.0)	−24.0 (−11.2)	−32.3 (−26.1)	−36.1 (−33.0)

Climate data for Quebec City (extremes)
Month	Jan	Feb	Mar	Apr	May	Jun	Jul	Aug	Sep	Oct	Nov	Dec	Year
Record high daily minimum °C (°F)	3.3 (37.9)	3.6 (38.5)	5.0 (41.0)	10.2 (50.4)	18.3 (64.9)	22.8 (73.0)	23.3 (73.9)	22.2 (72.0)	20.9 (69.6)	15.0 (59.0)	9.7 (49.5)	4.4 (39.9)	23.3 (73.9)
Record low daily maximum °C (°F)	-25.8 (-14.4)	-25.0 (-13.0)	-20.0 (-4.0)	-10.2 (13.6)	1.7 (35.1)	7.8 (46.0)	13.9 (57.0)	12.2 (54.0)	4.2 (39.6)	0.0 (32.0)	-13.3 (8.1)	-27.3 (-17.1)	-27.3 (-17.1)
Record high monthly average °C (°F)	-5.9 (21.4)	-4.0 (24.8)	0.1 (32.4)	7.7 (45.9)	15.3 (59.5)	19.7 (67.5)	22.5 (72.5)	21.4 (70.5)	16.5 (61.7)	10.8 (51.4)	3.2 (37.8)	-0.8 (30.6)	6.9 (44.4)
Record low monthly average °C (°F)	-18.4 (-1.1)	-16.5 (2.3)	-11.4 (11.5)	-0.8 (30.6)	7.7 (45.9)	14.7 (58.5)	17.6 (63.9)	16.1 (61.0)	11.1 (52.0)	3.3 (37.9)	-5.0 (23.0)	-17.0 (1.4)	2.8 (37.0)
source 1:
source 2:

Days with certain temperature thresholds
Month	Jan	Feb	Mar	Apr	May	Jun	Jul	Aug	Sep	Oct	Nov	Dec	Year
Hot days (≥30 °C)	0	0	0	0	0.2	1.3	2.6	0.8	0.13	0	0	0	5.1
Warm days (≥20 °C)	0	0	0	0.8	9.3	20.4	27.9	25.5	9.1	1.1	0	0	94.1
Mild days (≥10 °C)	0	0.07	0.73	9.9	27.5	29.9	31	31	29.1	17.7	2.4	0.2	179.5
Cold daylight (Max ≤0 °C)	26.7	22.8	13.4	1.4	0	0	0	0	0	0	7.7	22.9	94.9
Freezing days (below 0)	30.9	27.7	28.9	16.5	2.3	0.07	0	0	0.87	10.1	23.0	30.3	170.7
Cold days (≤-2 °C)	30.3	26.7	24.9	9.9	0.53	0	0	0	0.07	5	18.3	28.6	144.3
Very cold days (≤-10 °C)	25.2	21.9	13.5	0.87	0	0	0	0	0	0	4.1	19.3	84.8
Frigidly cold days (≤-20 °C)	12.9	8.7	2.9	0	0	0	0	0	0	0	0.2	6.5	31.3

== Precipitation ==
There are almost 900 mm of rain in Quebec City, The wettest month is July with 121.4 mm. While the driest is February of only 74.5. 1189.7 mm of total precipitation fall a year. Snowfall accumulates to 303.4 cm/yr.

=== Total precipitation ===
Climate data for Quebec
Month	Jan	Feb	Mar	Apr	May	Jun	Jul	Aug	Sep	Oct	Nov	Dec	Year
Average precipitation mm (inches)	86.6 (3.41)	74.5 (2.93)	76.1 (3.00)	83.5 (3.29)	115.9 (4.56)	111.4 (4.39)	121.4 (4.78)	104.2 (4.10)	115.5 (4.55)	98.3 (3.87)	102.5 (4.04)	99.9 (3.93)	1,189.7 (46.84)

Precipitation data for Quebec City
Month	Jan	Feb	Mar	Apr	May	Jun	Jul	Aug	Sep	Oct	Nov	Dec	Year
Highest monthly total precipitation	161.7 (6.4)	186.0 (7.3)	177.8 (7.0)	183.0 (7.2)	259.6 (10.2)	231.2 (9.1)	256.4 (10.1)	216.8 (8.5)	213.6 (8.4)	234.0 (9.2)	177.8 (7.0)	239.0 (9.4)	1578.2 (62.1)
Highest 24 hour total precipitation	53.4 (2.1)	53.4 (2.1)	63.5 (2.5)	55.4 (2.2)	54.2 (2.1)	78.0 (3.1)	59.9 (2.4)	55.4 (2.2)	81.2 (3.2)	56.9 (2.2)	45.7 (1.8)	49.6 (2.0)	81.2 (3.2)
