= Wet-bulb globe temperature =

Apparent temperature estimating how humans are affected

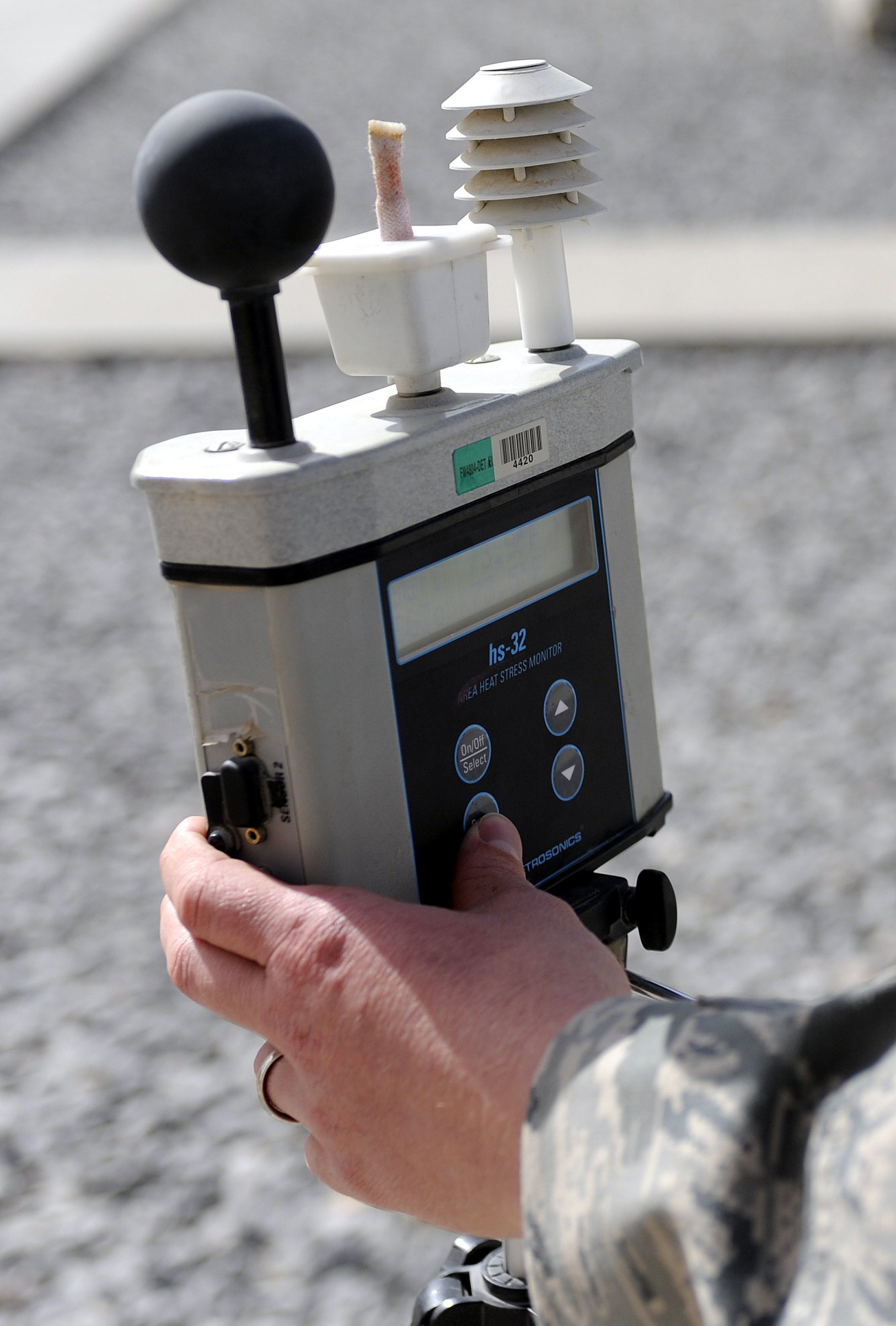
Electronic WBGT meter

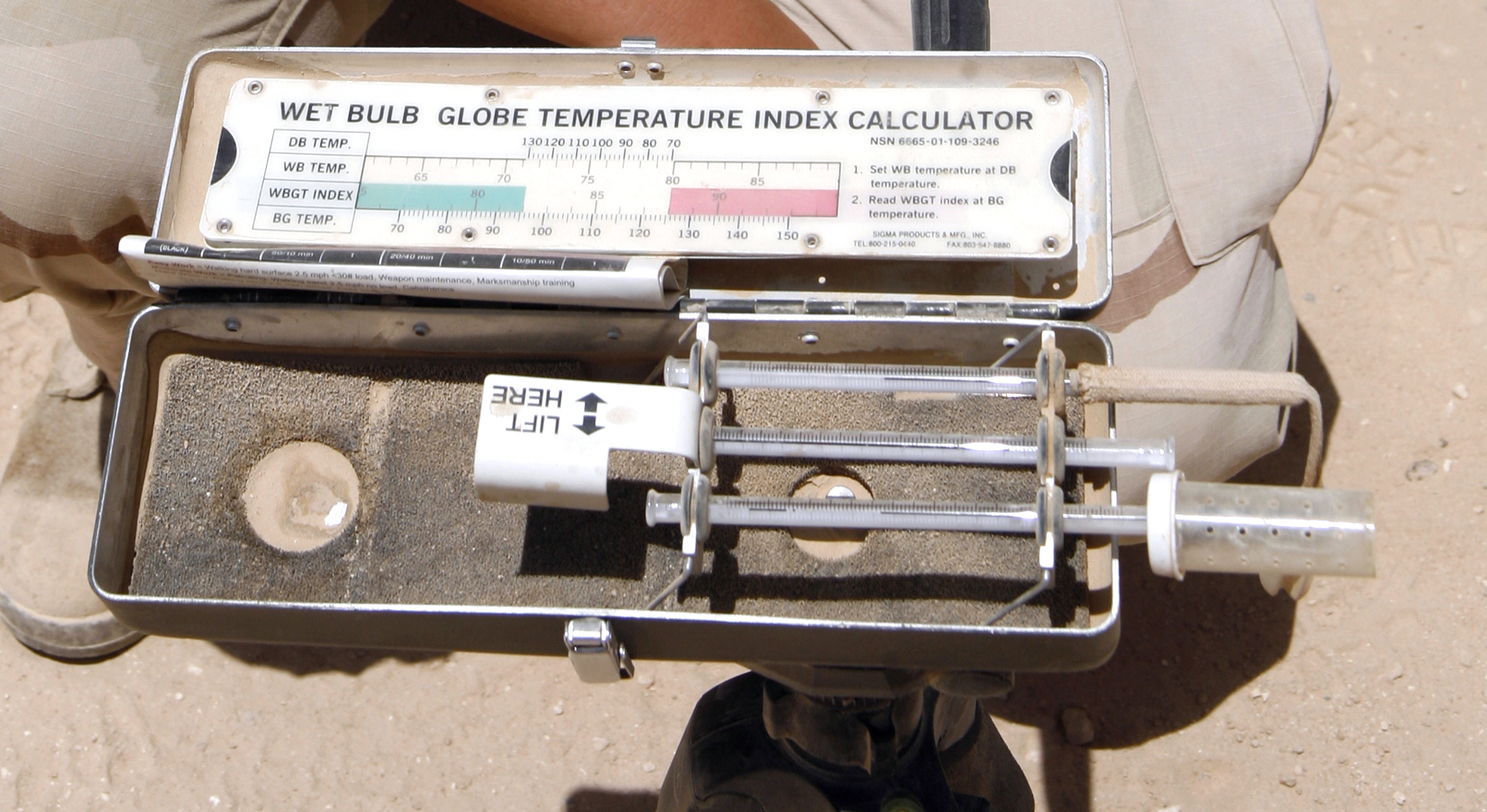
Analog WBGT meter consisting of three thermometers and a slide rule to compute WBGT

The wet-bulb globe temperature (WBGT) is a measure of environmental heat as it affects humans and animals. WBGT accounts for air temperature, humidity, heat radiation (from hot objects like the Sun or a furnace), and air movement (wind or ventilation). WBGT was developed in the 1950s as a part of an effort to reduce heat related illness and death during military training. It is used by industrial hygienists, athletes, sporting events, and militaries to determine appropriate exposure levels to high temperatures.

== Background ==
A WBGT meter combines three sensors, a dry-bulb thermometer, a natural (static) wet-bulb thermometer, and a black globe thermometer (for radiant heat), which together measure environmental conditions and calculates a single value representing overall heat stress.

For outdoor environments, the meter uses all sensor data inputs, calculating WBGT as:

$$\mathrm{WBGT} = 0.7\mathrm{T_w} + 0.2\mathrm{T_g} + 0.1\mathrm{T_d}$$

where

- $\mathrm{T_w}$ = Natural wet-bulb temperature (combined with dry-bulb temperature indicates humidity)
- $\mathrm{T_g}$ = Globe thermometer temperature (measured with a globe thermometer, also known as a black globe thermometer)
- $\mathrm{T_d}$ = Dry-bulb temperature (actual air temperature)
- Temperatures may be in either Celsius or Fahrenheit

Indoors the following formula is used:

$$\mathrm{WBGT} = 0.7\mathrm{T_w} + 0.3\mathrm{T_d}$$

If a meter is not available, the WBGT can be calculated from current or historic weather data. A clothing adjustment may be added to the WBGT to determine the "effective WBGT", $\mathrm{WBGT_{eff}}$.

== Uses ==
The American Conference of Governmental Industrial Hygienists publishes threshold limit values (TLVs) that have been adopted by many governments for use in the workplace. The process for determining the WBGT is also described in ISO 7243, Hot Environments - Estimation of the Heat Stress on Working Man, Based on the WBGT Index. The American College of Sports Medicine bases its guidelines on the intensity of sport practices based on WBGT.

In hot areas, some US military installations display a flag to indicate the heat category based on the WBGT. The military publishes guidelines for water intake and physical activity level for acclimated and unacclimated individuals in different uniforms based on the heat category. The University of Georgia adapted categories for use in college sports as a guideline for how strenuous practices can be.

== Safety considerations ==
It is used by the National Institute for Occupational Safety and Health (NIOSH), the Occupational Safety and Health Administration (OSHA), and the American Conference of Governmental Industrial Hygienists (ACGIH). WBGT serves as the basis for standards and regulations to prevent heat-related illnesses, such as heat stress, in the workplace. WBGT is an internationally recognized standard used to assess heat stress and conditions that may be a threat to human health and well-being, especially during periods of extreme heat events.

=== Health risks ===
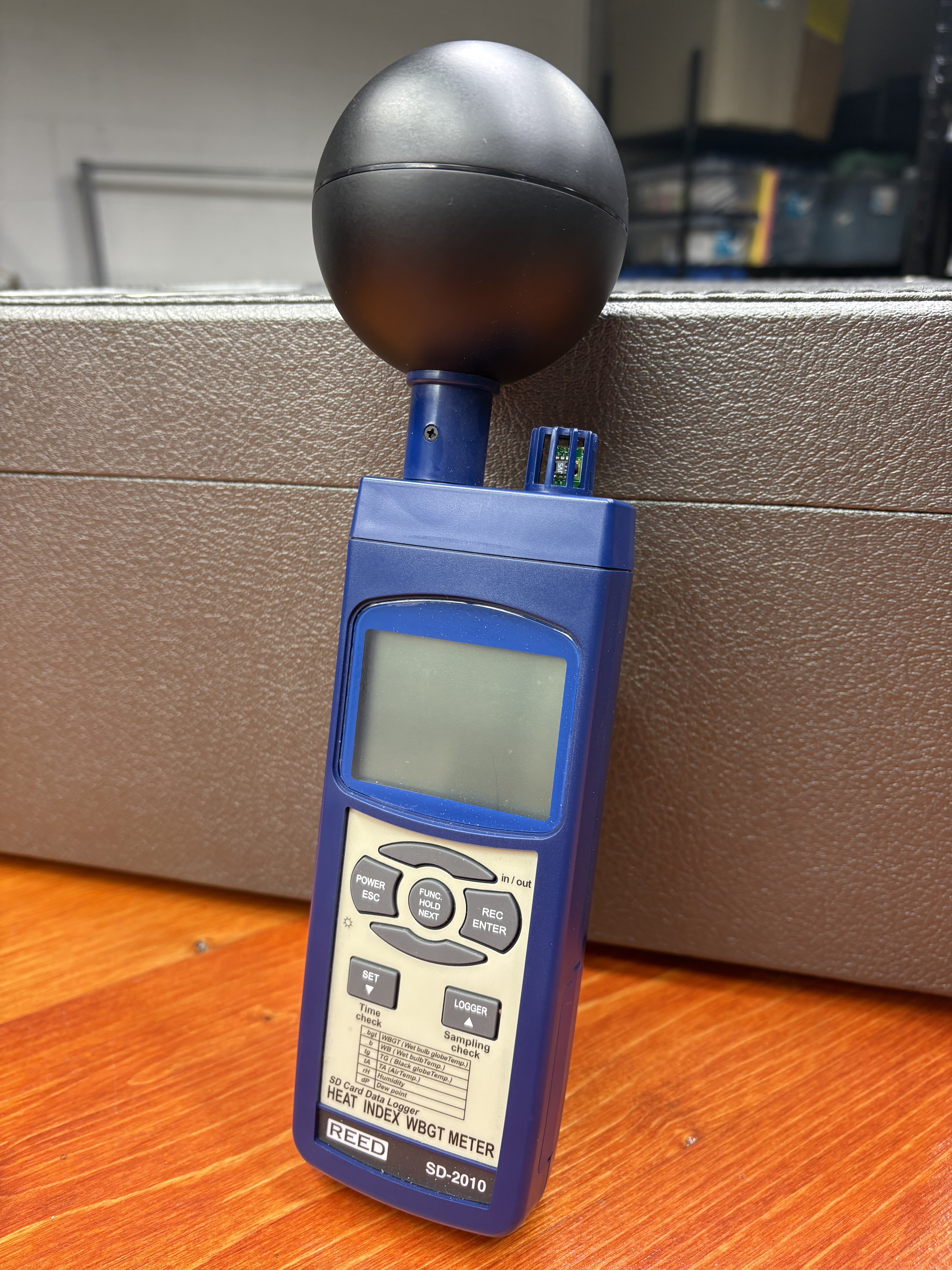
Data logging WBGT heat stress meter

Elevated WBGT is associated with increased risk of heat-related illnesses, such as heat exhaustion, heat stroke, and chronic kidney disease, as the body cannot dispel or dissipate heat from the body as easily, especially with heat waves and increasing global temperature. Long-term effects include immune system changes, which can lead to permanent damage to vital organs, such as the kidneys, heart, and brain, as well as other chronic health conditions.

WBGT meters, such as data logger heat stress monitors, are designed to help employers assess heat exposure by combining measured humidity, temperature, air movement, and direct or radiant sunlight into a single value that represents accurate heat stress conditions for workers. These meters are used in workplace safety monitoring, environmental/occupational assessments, and preventing heat-related illnesses for workers in intense heat environments.

=== Vulnerable populations ===
Outdoor and industrial workers are at the highest risk of health problems from overheating when working in ambient temperatures over 38 °C (100 °F). Heatstroke often results from factors such as increasing ambient temperature, high humidity, heavy physical workloads, prolonged sun exposure, improper clothing, and inadequate hydration. These concerns increase as factors such as a country's greenhouse gas emissions, population size, and socioeconomic status are taken into account. These risks are notably higher in mid-latitude and tropical climates, where populations experience year-round heat exposure due to their geographic location.

=== Global impacts ===
Global heat stress management strategies, prompted by the World Health Organization, emphasized the importance of reducing greenhouse gas emissions to protect worker health. Data from 2019 shows that in the past 10 years, 41.9% of worker deaths were linked to extreme heat exposure while working. Rising global temperatures increase temperature-related health risks but also significantly reduce worker productivity, capacity, and efficiency. WBGT is being used in safety research and in forecasting early warning systems to help guide public health responses.

== Related temperature comfort measures ==
The heat index used by the U.S. National Weather Service and the humidex used by the Meteorological Service of Canada, along with the wind chill used in both countries, are also measures of perceived heat or cold, but they do not account for the effects of radiation.

The NWS office in Tulsa, Oklahoma, in conjunction with Oral Roberts University's mathematics department, published an approximation formula to the WBGT that takes into account cloud cover and wind speed; in limited experimentation (four samples), the office claimed the estimate was regularly accurate to within 0.5 °F (0.28 °C), even with a simplification that reduces the equation from a four-degree polynomial to a linear relationship (the authors noted that the linear approximation was not tested for air temperatures under 68 °F (20 °C) since the WBGT is designed to measure heat stress, which seldom occurs below that threshold).

== See also ==
- Hygrometer
