= Stefano Schiavon =

Italian building-science researcher

- Born: November 4, 1981 (age 44); Bassano del Grappa, Italy
- Citizenship: Italian and American
- Education: University of Padua (MSc, PhD)
- Known for: Indoor environmental quality; thermal comfort; low-energy building design
- Awards: REHVA Young Scientist Award (2010), Ralph G. Nevins Award (2013), WELL Community Award (2021), Building & Environment Best Paper Awards (2018, 2024)
- Scientific career
- Fields: Architecture, building science, architectural engineering, civil and environmental engineering
- Workplaces: University of California, Berkeley; Polytechnic University of Turin
- Thesis: Energy savings with personalised ventilation and cooling fans (2009)

Stefano Schiavon is an Italian researcher in building science who focuses on reducing energy demand while improving occupant health and comfort. He is professor of Architecture and of Civil & Environmental Engineering at the University of California, Berkeley, where he also serves as associate director of Research at the Center for the Built Environment (CBE), and chairs the university’s MS-PhD programme in Building Science, Technology and Sustainability.

== Education ==
Schiavon earned an MSc in Mechanical Engineering (2005) and a PhD in Energy Engineering (Building Science, 2009) from the University of Padua in Italy. His doctoral work examined energy savings achievable through personalised ventilation and desk-fan cooling.

== Career ==
After completing post-doctoral research at UC Berkeley, Schiavon spent a brief period as an assistant professor at the Polytechnic University of Turin (2010–2011) before returning to UC Berkeley, progressing from assistant professor in Architecture (2011) to full professor in both Architecture and Civil & Environmental Engineering (2022). He has held visiting-scholar posts at the Technical University of Denmark, Tsinghua University, Lawrence Berkeley National Laboratory and, most recently, the Berkeley Education Alliance for Research in Singapore.

Schiavon’s laboratory and field studies have advanced knowledge of thermal comfort, indoor air quality, occupant satisfaction and low-energy HVAC systems. His Google Scholar profile lists more than 14,000 citations and an h-index above 55. Recent projects include work on the accuracy of thermal comfort models, personal comfort systems, radiant cooling, and personal comfort models.

== Awards ==
- REHVA Young Scientist Award (2010) for early-career contributions to HVAC research
- Ralph G. Nevins Physiology and Human Environment Award (ASHRAE, 2013) recognising impactful studies on human responses to indoor environments
- WELL Community Award (International WELL Building Institute, 2021) for advisory work on healthy buildings

== Selected publications ==
Schiavon has published more than 120 peer-reviewed journal articles; notable papers include:

- Altomonte, S., & Schiavon, S. (2013). Occupant satisfaction in LEED and non-LEED certified buildings. Building and Environment, 68, 66-76.
- Schiavon, S., & Lee, K. H. (2013). Dynamic predictive clothing insulation models based on outdoor air and indoor operative temperatures. Building and Environment, 59, 250-260.
- Schiavon, S., & Melikov, A. K. (2008). Energy saving and improved comfort by increased air movement. Energy and buildings, 40(10), 1954-1960.
