= Center for the Built Environment =

Research center at the University of California, Berkeley

The CBE logo

The Center for the Built Environment (CBE) is a research center at the University of California, Berkeley. CBE's mission is to improve the environmental quality and energy efficiency of buildings by providing timely, unbiased information on building technologies and design techniques. CBE's work is supported by a consortium of building industry leaders, including manufacturers, building owners, contractors, architects, engineers, utilities, and government agencies. The CBE also maintains an online newsletter of the center's latest activities called Centerline.

== Overview ==
The Center for the Built Environment was founded in 1997 under the National Science Foundation Industry/University Cooperative Research Center (I/UCRC) program. It is one of the research centers in the Center for Environmental Design Research (CEDR), an Organized Research Unit at the University of California, Berkeley. CBE supports and trains master's and doctoral students in the Building Science, Technology, and Sustainability program in the Department of Architecture at the College of Environmental Design.

It is one of the largest university laboratories devoted to building science research in the United States. Facilities include a controlled environment chamber (designed to resemble a contemporary office, while allowing control over the levels of temperature, humidity, ventilation, and lighting in the space), a boundary-layer wind tunnel, and a collection of portable equipment for acquiring and analyzing data from field experiments.

== Research ==
CBE's research areas include:

- Indoor Environmental Quality (IEQ): CBE’s thermal comfort research program explores ways to advance energy and comfort in buildings, vehicles, clothing and the outdoor environment.
- Building HVAC (Heating, Ventilation, Air Conditioning) Systems: CBE is pursuing multiple projects to advance emerging HVAC systems and control strategies. Major development includes developing guidelines, tools, and resources for radiant heating and cooling systems, underfloor air distribution systems, optimization of building automation systems, and low-GWP heat pumps.
- Embodied Carbon and Life Cycle Assessment: In 2022, CBE established a program to study embodied carbon in the built environment. Research includes developing design guidance and tools for industry stakeholders and policymakers to enable the adoption of low-carbon construction materials and practices.
- Facade Systems: CBE continues several building envelope efforts. Major development includes developing an adaptive comfort model for thermal comfort in naturally ventilated buildings, investigating multiple topics related to mixed-mode buildings, and analyzing the impact of window views, and their related impacts on thermal comfort, emotional states and cognitive performance.
- Human Interactions: Multiple projects focus on perceptions, behaviors, and relationship occupants have with the environments in which they interact, and provide tools to examine occupants’ relationship with their spaces. Major development includes developing a web-based occupant indoor environmental quality survey tool to assess the performance and success of the design and analyzing the occupant satisfaction in green and LEED-Certified buildings.
- Online Tools: CBE develops and maintains a variety of free online tools for research and industry use in building performance and indoor environmental quality. These include the CBE Thermal Comfort Tool for predicting conventional and adaptive thermal comfort models and the CBE Clima Tool for climate data visualization and analysis.
- Sustainability, Whole Building Energy, and Other Topics.

CBE provides information about its research areas and publications on its website. More than 620 works by researchers affiliated with CBE are available to the public on the center's eScholarship page.

Its research team and advisory board guides CBE's research program. The CBE advisory board includes manufacturers, building owners, facility managers, contractors, architects, engineers, government agencies, and professional associations. The research team includes people from across UC Berkeley's campus, with both staff scientists and graduate students, as well as scientists from Lawrence Berkeley National Lab and visiting experts from industry and other research institutions.

== Directors ==
The Center for the Built Environment is directed by Gail Brager. Brager has been a Professor in the College of Environmental Design since 1984 and also serves as the Director of the Center for Environmental Design Research and Associate Dean of the Graduate Division at UC Berkeley. Her research addresses the sustainable design, operation, and assessment of buildings, with a focus on thermal comfort and adaptation, occupant well-being, natural ventilation, and personalized environmental control. Brager was the founding Chair of the Research Committee of the US Green Building Council. She is also an ASHRAE Fellow and past president of the Golden Gate ASHRAE Chapter.

Stefano Schiavon is CBE’s Associate Director of Research, as well as Professor of Architecture and Civil and Environmental Engineering at UC Berkeley and Associate Dean for Research at the College of Environmental Design. He conducts research focused on reducing energy consumption in buildings while improving indoor environmental quality, including personal comfort models and systems, occupant satisfaction, underfloor air distribution (UFAD), radiant systems, air movement, thermal comfort and statistical modeling.

== Industry Consortium ==
The CBE has multiple partners from industry and government organizations, which contribute to research activity by keeping the Center focused on current issues and research. As a CBE member or as a sponsor, partners have opportunities that include: influencing the direction of the research, access to facilities, access tools and trained personnel, access to research studies results, influence cost-effectiveness, association with diverse industries, staff training and recruiting opportunities, corporate responsibility and community relations.

Member agreements rank on different levels, covering industry sustaining memberships, A/E/C (architecture, engineering, construction firm) memberships, and small business memberships. The CBE maintains a list of current industry partners.
