= Effect of radiation on perceived temperature =

The "radiation effect" results from radiation heat exchange between human bodies and surrounding surfaces, such as walls and ceilings. It may lead to phenomena such as houses feeling cooler in the winter and warmer in the summer at the same temperature. For example, in a room in which air temperature is maintained at 22 °C at all times, but in which the inner surfaces of the house is estimated to be an average temperature of 10 °C in the winter or 25 °C in the summer, heat transfer from the surfaces to the individual will occur, resulting in a difference in the perceived temperature.

We can observe and compare the rate of radiation heat transfer between a person and the surrounding surfaces if we first make a few simplifying assumptions:

- The heat exchange in the environment is in a "steady state", meaning that there is a constant flow of heat either into or out of the house.
- The person is completely surrounded by the interior surfaces of the room.
- Heat transfer by convection is not considered.
- The walls, ceiling, and floor are all at the same temperature.

For an average person, the outer surface area is 1.4 m^{2}, the surface temperature is 30 °C, and the emissivity (ε) is 0.95. Emissivity is the ability of a surface to emit radiative energy compared to that of a black body at the same temperature. We will be using the following equation to find out how much heat is lost by a person standing in the same room in summertime as compared to the winter, at exactly the same thermostat reading temperature:

$$\dot{Q}=\varepsilon\sigma A_s (T_s^4 - T_{surr}^4)$$

Where $\dot{Q}$ is the rate of heat loss (W), $\varepsilon$ is the emissivity (or the ability of an objects surface to emit energy by radiation) of a person, $\sigma$ is the Stefan–Boltzmann constant ($\sigma=5.670373 \times 10^{-8}\, \mathrm{W\, m^{-2}K^{-4}}$), $A_s$ is the surface area of a person, $T_s$ is the surface temperature of a person (K), and $T_{surr}$ is the surface temperature of the walls, ceiling, and floor (K). This equation is only valid for an object standing in a completely enclosed room, box, etc.

In the winter, the amount of heat loss from a person is then 152 Watts if the inner surfaces of the room is, for example, 10 degrees Celsius.

$$\dot{Q}=0.95 \times 5.670373 \times 10^{-8} \times 1.4 \times ((30+273.15)^4 - (10+273.15)^4) = 152.17$$

In the summer, the amount of heat loss from a person, when the inner surfaces of the room were 25 degrees Celsius, was found to be 40.9 Watts.

$$\dot{Q}=0.95 \times 5.670373 \times 10^{-8} \times 1.4 \times ((30+273.15)^4 - (25+273.15)^4) = 40.9$$

Thermal radiation emitted by all bodies above absolute zero (-273.15 °C). It differs from other forms of electromagnetic radiation such as x-rays, gamma rays, microwaves that are not related to temperature. Therefore, people constantly radiate their body heat, but at different rates depending on body and surrounding temperatures. From these values, the rate of heat loss from a person is almost four times as large in the winter than in the summer, which explains the "chill" we feel in the winter even if the thermostat setting is kept the same.
