= Mean radiant temperature =

Type of temperature

The concept of mean radiant temperature (MRT) is used to quantify the exchange of radiant heat between a human and their surrounding environment, with a view to understanding the influence of surface temperatures on personal comfort and heat stress. Mean radiant temperature has been both qualitatively defined and quantitatively evaluated for both indoor and outdoor environments.

MRT is defined as the uniform temperature of an imaginary enclosure in which the radiant heat transfer from the human body is equal to the radiant heat transfer in the actual non-uniform enclosure.

MRT is a useful concept as the net exchange of radiant energy between two objects is approximately proportional to the product of their temperature difference multiplied by their emissivity (ability to emit and absorb heat). The MRT is the area weighted mean temperature of all the objects surrounding the body. This is meaningful as long as the temperature differences of the objects are small compared to their absolute temperatures, allowing linearization of the Stefan-Boltzmann Law in the relevant temperature range.

MRT also has a strong influence on thermophysiological comfort indexes such as the predicted mean vote (PMV).

What we experience and feel relating to thermal comfort in a built environment is related to the influence of, among other variables, both the air temperature and the temperature of surfaces in that space, represented by the mean radiant temperature. The MRT is affected by enclosure performances.

The operative temperature, which is a more functional measure of thermal comfort in a building, is calculated from air temperature, mean radiant temperature and air speed. In mechanically conditioned office buildings, mean radiant temperature is often close to air temperature and, under typical office conditions, air temperature is usually a sufficient estimate of mean radiant temperature for thermal comfort estimation and control.

In outdoor settings, mean radiant temperature is affected by air temperature but also by the radiation of absorbed heat from the materials used in sidewalks, streets, and buildings. It can be mitigated by tree cover and green space, which act as sources of shade and promote evaporative cooling. The experienced mean radiant temperature outdoors can vary widely depending on local conditions.

== Calculation ==
There are different ways to estimate the mean radiant temperature, either applying its definition and using equations to calculate it, or measuring it with particular thermometers or sensors.

Since the amount of radiant heat lost or received by human body is the algebraic sum of all radiant fluxes exchanged by its exposed parts with the surrounding sources, MRT can be calculated from the measured temperature of surrounding walls and surfaces and their positions with respect to the person. Therefore, it is necessary to measure those temperatures and the angle factors between the person and the surrounding surfaces. Most building materials have a high emittance ε, so all surfaces in the room can be assumed to be black. Because the sum of the angle factors is unity, the fourth power of MRT equals the mean value of the surrounding surface temperatures to the fourth power, weighted by the respective angle factors.

The following equation is used:

$MRT^4 = T_1^4 F_{p-1} + T_2^4 F_{p-2} + ... + T_n^4 F_{p-n}$

where:

$MRT$ is Mean Radiant Temperature;
$T_n$ is the temperature of surface "n", in Kelvins;
$F_{p-n}$ is the angle factor between a person and surface "n".

If relatively small temperature differences exist between the surfaces of the enclosure, the equation can be simplified to the following linear form:

$MRT = T_1 F_{p-1} + T_2 F_{p-2} + ... + T_n F_{p-n}$

This linear formula tends to give a lower value of MRT, but in many cases the difference is small.

In general, angle factors are difficult to determine, and they normally depend on the position and orientation of the person. Furthermore, this method becomes complex and time consuming as the number of surfaces increases and they have elaborate shapes. There is currently no way to effectively collect this data. For this reason, an easier way to determine the MRT is by measuring it with a particular thermometer.

== Measurement ==
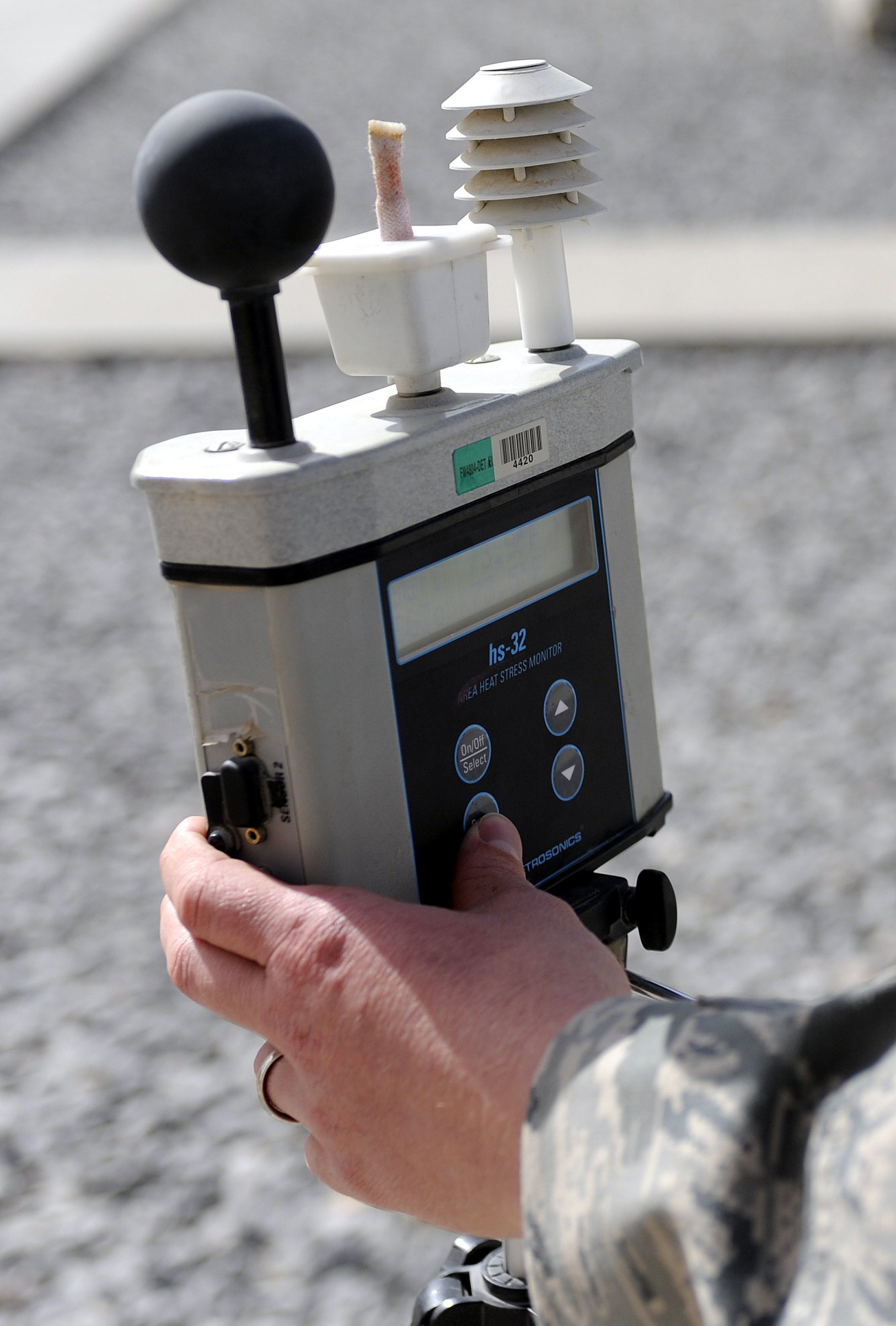
A handheld wet-bulb globe temperature meter, including a black-globe thermometer (left)

The MRT can be estimated using a black-globe thermometer. The black-globe thermometer consists of a black globe in the center of which is placed a temperature sensor such as the bulb of a mercury thermometer, a thermocouple or a resistance probe. The globe can in theory have any diameter but as the formulae used in the calculation of the mean radiant temperature depend on the diameter of the globe, a diameter of 15 centimetres (6 in), specified for use with these formulae, is generally recommended. The smaller the diameter of the globe, the greater the effect of the air temperature and air velocity, thus causing a reduction in the accuracy of the measurement of the mean radiant temperature. So that the external surface of the globe absorbs the radiation from the walls of the enclosure, the surface of the globe is darkened, either by an electro-chemical coating or, more usually, by a layer of matte black paint. This thermometer actually measures the globe temperature (GT), tending towards thermal balance under the effect of convection and radiation coming from the different heat sources in the enclosure. Thanks to this principle, knowing GT allows the mean radiant temperature MRT to be determined. According to ISO 7726 Standard, the equation that is used most frequently (forced convection) is the following:

$MRT = \left[ \left(GT+273.15 \right)^4 + \frac{1.1 \cdot 10^8 \cdot v_a^{0.6}} {\varepsilon \cdot D^{0.4}}(GT - T_a) \right]^{1/4} - 273.15$

When air velocity is less than 1m/s (natural convection), the equation is the following:

$MRT = \left[ \left(GT+273.15 \right)^4 + \frac{0.25 \cdot 10^8} {\varepsilon} \left(\frac{|GT - T_a|} {D} \right)^{1/4} (GT - T_a) \right]^{1/4} - 273.15$

where:

$MRT$ is the mean radiant temperature (°C);
$GT$ is the globe temperature (°C);
$v_a$ is the air velocity at the level of the globe (m/s);
$\varepsilon$ is the emissivity of the globe (no dimension);
$D$ is the diameter of the globe (m);
$T_a$ is air temperature (°C);

And for the standard globe (D = 0.150 m, $\varepsilon$ = 0.95):

$MRT = \left[ \left(GT+273.15 \right)^4 + 2.5 \cdot 10^8 \cdot v_a^{0.6}(GT - T_a) \right]^{1/4} - 273.15$

The measurement is affected by air movement because the measured GT depends on both convection and radiation transfer. By effectively increasing the size of the thermometer bulb, the convection transfer coefficient is reduced and the effect of radiation is proportionally increased. Because of local convective air currents GT typically lies between the air temperature and MRT. The faster the air moves over the globe thermometer, the closer GT approaches the air temperature.

Moreover, since the MRT is defined with respect to the human body, the shape of the sensor is also a factor. The spherical shape of the globe thermometer gives a reasonable approximation of a seated person; for people who are standing, the globe, in a radiant nonuniform environment, overestimates the radiation from floor or ceiling, so an ellipsoid sensor gives a better approximation.

There are several other precautions to be taken when using a black-globe thermometer, depending on the conditions of the measurement. Furthermore, there are different measuring methods, such as the two-sphere radiometer and the constant-air-temperature sensor.

== See also ==
- Thermal comfort
- Heating, Ventilation and Air-Conditioning
- ASHRAE
- Glossary of HVAC
