= Hue-heat hypothesis =

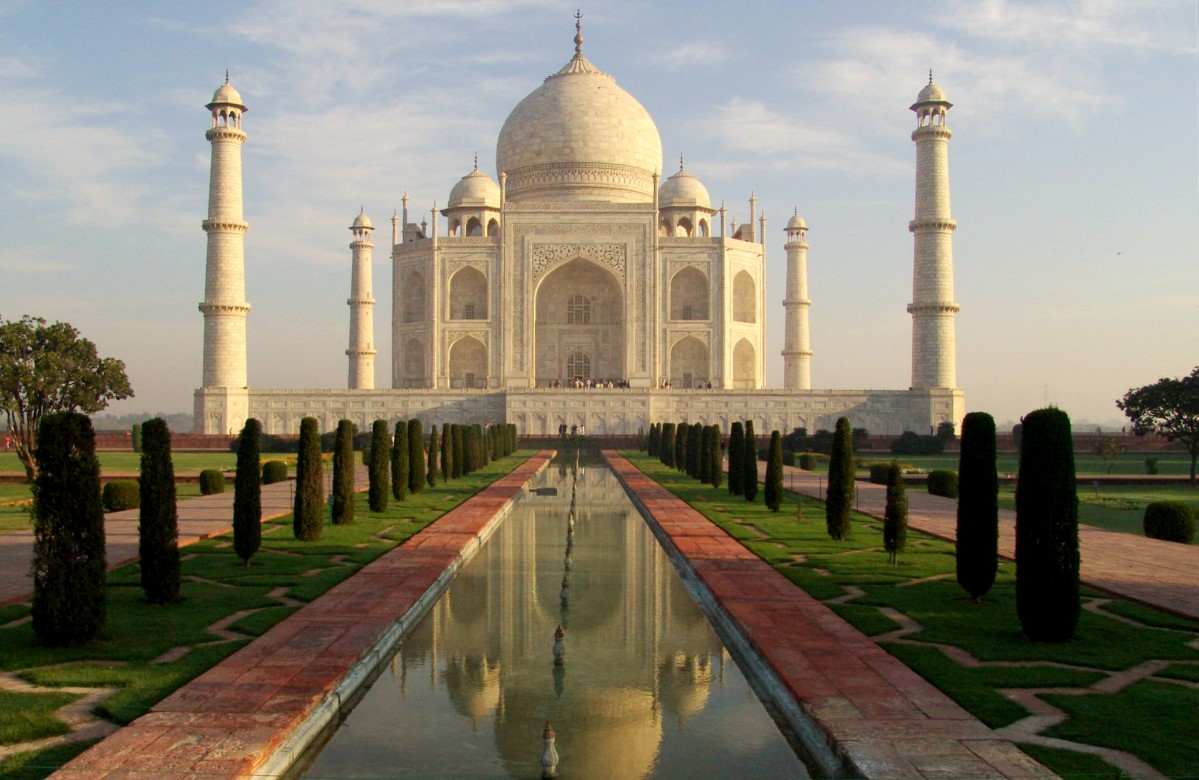
Taj Mahal in warm light from a low elevation sun.

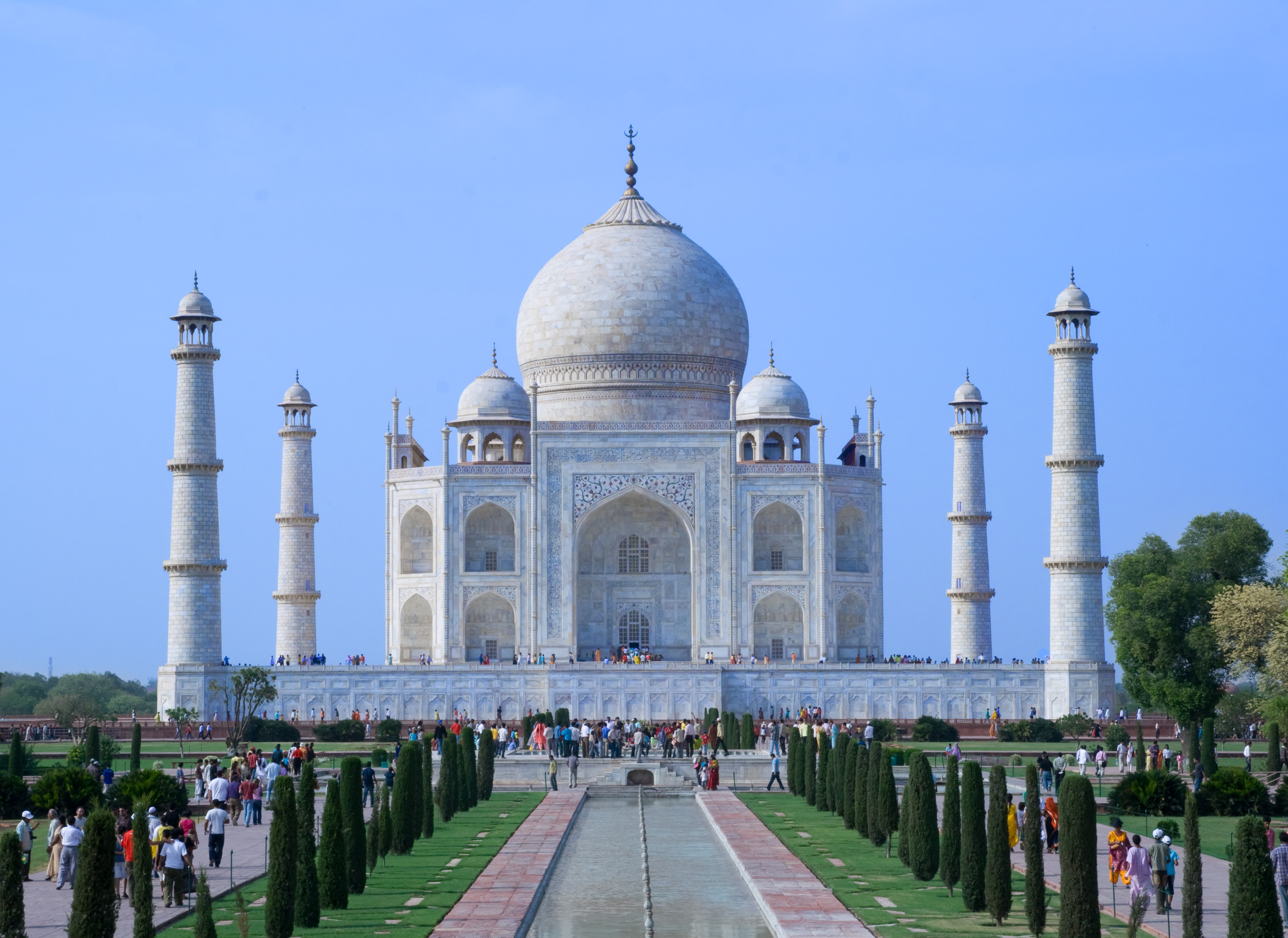
Taj Mahal in the cold light from a high elevation sun.

The hue-heat hypothesis is the hypothesis that an environment with warm colors (red, orange yellow hues) will feel warmer in terms of temperature and comfort, while an environment with cold colors (blue, green hues) will feel cooler.

The idea is both investigated scientifically and long ingrained throughout the arts and broader culture, as in the terms of warm and cool colors.

== See also ==
- Color temperature
- Color theory
