= ASHRAE =

American HVAC professional association

- American Society of Heating, Refrigerating and Air-Conditioning Engineers
- Formation: 1895; 131 years ago
- Type: Not-for-profit membership organization
- Headquarters: 180 Technology Parkway, Peachtree Corners, Georgia 30092
- Location: United States
- Coordinates: 33.961800°N 84.220889°W
- Region served: Worldwide
- Members: Over 50,000 in over 132 countries
- Official language: English
- President: Sarah E. Maston, P.E., BCxP, LEED AP 2026-27 ASHRAE President
- Website: www.ashrae.org

The American Society of Heating, Refrigerating and Air-Conditioning Engineers (ASHRAE /ˈæʃreɪ/ ASH-ray) is an American professional association dedicated to advancing the arts and sciences of heating, ventilation, air conditioning and refrigeration (HVAC&R) systems design and construction. ASHRAE has over 50,000 members in more than 132 countries.

ASHRAE's members comprise building services engineers, architects, mechanical contractors, building owners, equipment manufacturers' employees, and others concerned with the design and construction of HVAC&R systems in buildings. The society funds research projects, offers continuing education programs, and develops and publishes technical standards to improve building services engineering, energy efficiency, indoor air quality, and sustainable development.

== History ==
ASHRAE was founded in 1894 at a meeting of engineers in New York City, formerly headquartered at 345 East 47th Street (the United Engineering Center), and has held an annual meeting since 1895. Until 1954 it was known as the American Society of Heating and Ventilating Engineers (ASHVE); in that year it changed its name to the American Society of Heating and Air-Conditioning Engineers (ASHAE). Its current name and organization came from the 1959 merger of ASHAE and the American Society of Refrigerating Engineers (ASRE).

Despite having 'American' in its name, ASHRAE is a global organization, holding international events. In 2012, it rebranded itself with a new logo and tagline: "Shaping Tomorrow's Built Environment Today".

== Publications ==
The ASHRAE Handbook is a four-volume resource for HVAC&R technology and is available in both print and electronic versions. The volumes are Fundamentals, HVAC Applications, HVAC Systems and Equipment, and Refrigeration. One of the four volumes is updated each year.

ASHRAE also publishes a set of standards and guidelines relating to HVAC systems and issues that are often referenced in building codes and used by consulting engineers, mechanical contractors, architects, and government agencies. These standards are periodically reviewed, revised and republished.

Examples of some ASHRAE Standards are:

- Standard 15 – Safety Standard for Refrigeration Systems
- Standard 15.2 – Safety Standard for Refrigeration Systems in Residential Applications
- Standard 34 – Designation and Safety Classification of Refrigerants
- Standard 55 – Thermal Environmental Conditions for Human Occupancy
- Standard 62.1 – Ventilation for Acceptable Indoor Air Quality (versions: 2001 and earlier as "62", 2004 and beyond as "62.1")
- Standard 62.2 – Ventilation and Acceptable Indoor Air Quality in Low-Rise Residential Buildings
- Standard 90.1 – Energy Standard for Buildings Except Low-Rise Residential Buildings – The IESNA is a joint sponsor of this standard.
- Standard 135 – BACnet - A Data Communication Protocol for Building Automation and Control Networks
- Standard 188 – Legionellosis: Risk Management for Building Water Systems
- Standard 189.1 – Standard for the Design of High Performance, Green Buildings Except Low-Rise Residential Buildings
- Standard 241 - Control of Infectious Aerosols

The society also publishes two magazines: the ASHRAE Journal is issued monthly, and High Performing Buildings Magazine is published quarterly. They contain articles on related technology, information on upcoming meetings, editorials, and case studies of various well-performing buildings.

ASHRAE also publishes books, ASHRAE Transactions, and the International Journal of HVAC&R Research.

== Legislation ==
ASHRAE supported the Streamlining Energy Efficiency for Schools Act of 2014 (H.R. 4092; 113th Congress), a bill that would require the United States Department of Energy to establish a centralized clearinghouse to disseminate information on federal programs, incentives, and mechanisms for financing energy-efficient retrofits and upgrades at schools.

== Society awards ==
ASHRAE offers six categories of awards: achievement awards to recognize personal honors; personal awards for general and specific society activities; paper awards; society awards for groups or chapters; chapters and regional awards.

=== ASHRAE Fellows ===
ASHRAE Fellow is a Membership Grade of Distinction conferred by The College of Fellows of ASHRAE, Inc. to an ASHRAE member with significant publications or innovations and distinguished scientific and engineering background in the fields of heating, refrigeration, air conditioning, ventilation. The ASHRAE Fellow membership grade is the highest elected grade in ASHRAE.

== Hall of Fame ==
ASHRAE has a Hall of Fame honoring "deceased members who have made milestone contributions to the growth of ASHRAE-related technology. Individuals inducted into the Hall of Fame must have been an ASHRAE member (any grade) or a member of a predecessor Society and must have shown evidence of distinction in the Society, either technically or academically."

== Headquarters renewal ==
To demonstrate the Society's commitment to sustainability, ASHRAE renovated its previous headquarters building in Atlanta, Ga. After the renovation and occupancy in June 2008, the building received many awards, including an Energy Star rating with a score of 95, a Platinum Certification from USGBC's LEED program, and four Green Globes from the Green Building Initiative. The current site energy use intensity (EUI) is 35.8 kBtu/Sqft (411 MJ/m2), a 60 percent reduction from the pre-renovation value. The renovation included the use of a dedicated outdoor air supply (DOAS) system with energy recovery and humidity control; a ground-source heat pump system; and variable refrigerant flow systems with heat recovery. The building also serves as a live case study. A web-based user interface allowed researchers around the world to extract data from the building to study factors such as energy use and electric power demand, water consumption and indoor air quality.

In 2018, ASHRAE decided to move their world headquarters, settling on retrofitting a 1970s-era building in Peachtree Corners, suburban Atlanta. Completed in 2022, the building has been renovated to comply with ASHRAE's own standards, including ASHRAE 90.1, and the organization has the goal of operating the building at net-zero energy, powered by a large on-site solar array.

== See also ==
- ASHRAE 90.1
- ASHRAE 55
- ASHRAE Handbook
- American National Standards Institute
- Building services engineering
- Chartered Institution of Building Services Engineers
- Chartered Association of Building Engineers
- Ralph G. Nevins
- Sick building syndrome
- Uniform Codes
- Uniform Mechanical Code
