= Humidex =

Index number to describe the feeling of heat in Canada

Plot of humidex depending on temperature and relative humidity

The humidex (short for humidity index) is an index number used by Canadian meteorologists to describe how hot the weather feels to the average person, by combining the effect of heat and humidity. The term humidex was coined in 1965. The humidex is a nominally dimensionless quantity (though generally recognized by the public as equivalent to the degree Celsius) based on the dew point.

Range of humidex: Scale of comfort

- 20 to 29: Little to no discomfort
- 30 to 39: Some discomfort
- 40 to 45: Great discomfort; avoid exertion
- Above 45: Dangerous; heat stroke quite possible

== History ==
The current formula for determining the humidex was developed by J. M. Masterton and F. A. Richardson of Canada's Atmospheric Environment Service in 1979. A superficial difference between Humidex and the heat index used in the United States is that it is generally expressed as a function of temperature and dew point rather than temperature and relative humidity, though either could be written in terms of any two of those variables.

For 54 years, the record humidex in Canada was held by Windsor, Ontario, which hit 52.1 on 20 June 1953, as reported by Environment Canada. This value was beaten on 25 July 2007 when Carman, Manitoba, hit 52.6.

== Computation formula ==
When the temperature is 30 °C (86 °F) and the dew point is 15 °C (59 °F), the humidex is 34. If the temperature remains 30 °C (86 °F) and the dew point rises to 25 °C (77 °F), the humidex rises to 42. The humidex is higher than the U.S. heat index at equal temperature and relative humidity.

The humidex formula is as follows:
$$\text{Humidex} = {T}_\text{air} + 0.5555(e - 10.0),$$
where $e$ is the vapour pressure in millibars given by:
$$e = 6.11 \exp \left[ 5417.7530 \left( \frac{1}{273.16} - \frac{1}{T_\text{dewpoint}} \right) \right].$$

Also note:

- ${T}_\text{air}$ is the air temperature in degrees Celsius
- ${T}_\text{dewpoint}$ is the dewpoint in kelvins, which can be calculated from dewpoint in degrees Celsius using $\{T\}_\text{K} = \{T\}_{^\circ\text{C}} + 273.15$

5417.7530 is a rounded constant based on the molecular weight of water, latent heat of evaporation, and the universal gas constant. The humidity adjustment approximately amounts to one Fahrenheit degree for every millibar by which the partial pressure of water in the atmosphere exceeds 10 millibars (10 hPa).

At the time the humidex was originally developed in 1965, Canada was still on the Fahrenheit scale, and thus the humidex was originally based on that. The 1979 reformulation added the 0.5555 factor (from the relation 1 °F = 5/9 °C), to address metrication in Canada as the country switched to the Celsius scale.

=== Table ===
Humidex for range 15–43 °C
		Temperature (°C)																												
		15	16	17	18	19	20	21	22	23	24	25	26	27	28	29	30	31	32	33	34	35	36	37	38	39	40	41	42	43
Dew point (°C)
Dew point (°C)	10	16	17	18	19	20	21	22	23	24	25	26	27	28	29	30	31	32	33	34	35	36	37	38	39	40	41	42	43	44
Dew point (°C)	11	17	18	19	20	21	22	23	24	25	26	27	28	29	30	31	32	33	34	35	36	37	38	39	40	41	42	43	44	45
Dew point (°C)	12	17	18	19	20	21	22	23	24	25	26	27	28	29	30	31	32	33	34	35	36	37	38	39	40	41	42	43	44	45
Dew point (°C)	13	18	19	20	21	22	23	24	25	26	27	28	29	30	31	32	33	34	35	36	37	38	39	40	41	42	43	44	45	46
Dew point (°C)	14	18	19	20	21	22	23	24	25	26	27	28	29	30	31	32	33	34	35	36	37	38	39	40	41	42	43	44	45	46
Dew point (°C)	15	19	20	21	22	23	24	25	26	27	28	29	30	31	32	33	34	35	36	37	38	39	40	41	42	43	44	45	46	47
Dew point (°C)	16		21	22	23	24	25	26	27	28	29	30	31	32	33	34	35	36	37	38	39	40	41	42	43	44	45	46	47	48
Dew point (°C)	17			22	23	24	25	26	27	28	29	30	31	32	33	34	35	36	37	38	39	40	41	42	43	44	45	46	47	48
Dew point (°C)	18				24	25	26	27	28	29	30	31	32	33	34	35	36	37	38	39	40	41	42	43	44	45	46	47	48	49
Dew point (°C)	19					26	27	28	29	30	31	32	33	34	35	36	37	38	39	40	41	42	43	44	45	46	47	48	49	50
Dew point (°C)	20						28	29	30	31	32	33	34	35	36	37	38	39	40	41	42	43	44	45	46	47	48	49	50	51
Dew point (°C)	21							29	30	31	32	33	34	35	36	37	38	39	40	41	42	43	44	45	46	47	48	49	50	51
Dew point (°C)	22								31	32	33	34	35	36	37	38	39	40	41	42	43	44	45	46	47	48	49	50	51	52
Dew point (°C)	23									33	34	35	36	37	38	39	40	41	42	43	44	45	46	47	48	49	50	51	52	53
Dew point (°C)	24										35	36	37	38	39	40	41	42	43	44	45	46	47	48	49	50	51	52	53	54
Dew point (°C)	25											37	38	39	40	41	42	43	44	45	46	47	48	49	50	51	52	53	54	55
Dew point (°C)	26												39	40	41	42	43	44	45	46	47	48	49	50	51	52	53	54	55	56
Dew point (°C)	27													42	43	44	45	46	47	48	49	50	51	52	53	54	55	56	57	58
Dew point (°C)	28														44	45	46	47	48	49	50	51	52	53	54	55	56	57	58	59

== See also ==
- Heat index (with temperature chart in both °C and °F)
- AccuWeather RealFeel temperature
- Thermal stress on humans
- Wind chill
