= Clinton Engineer Works =

Manhattan Project uranium enrichment facility

Coordinates: 36°0′48″N 84°15′45″W

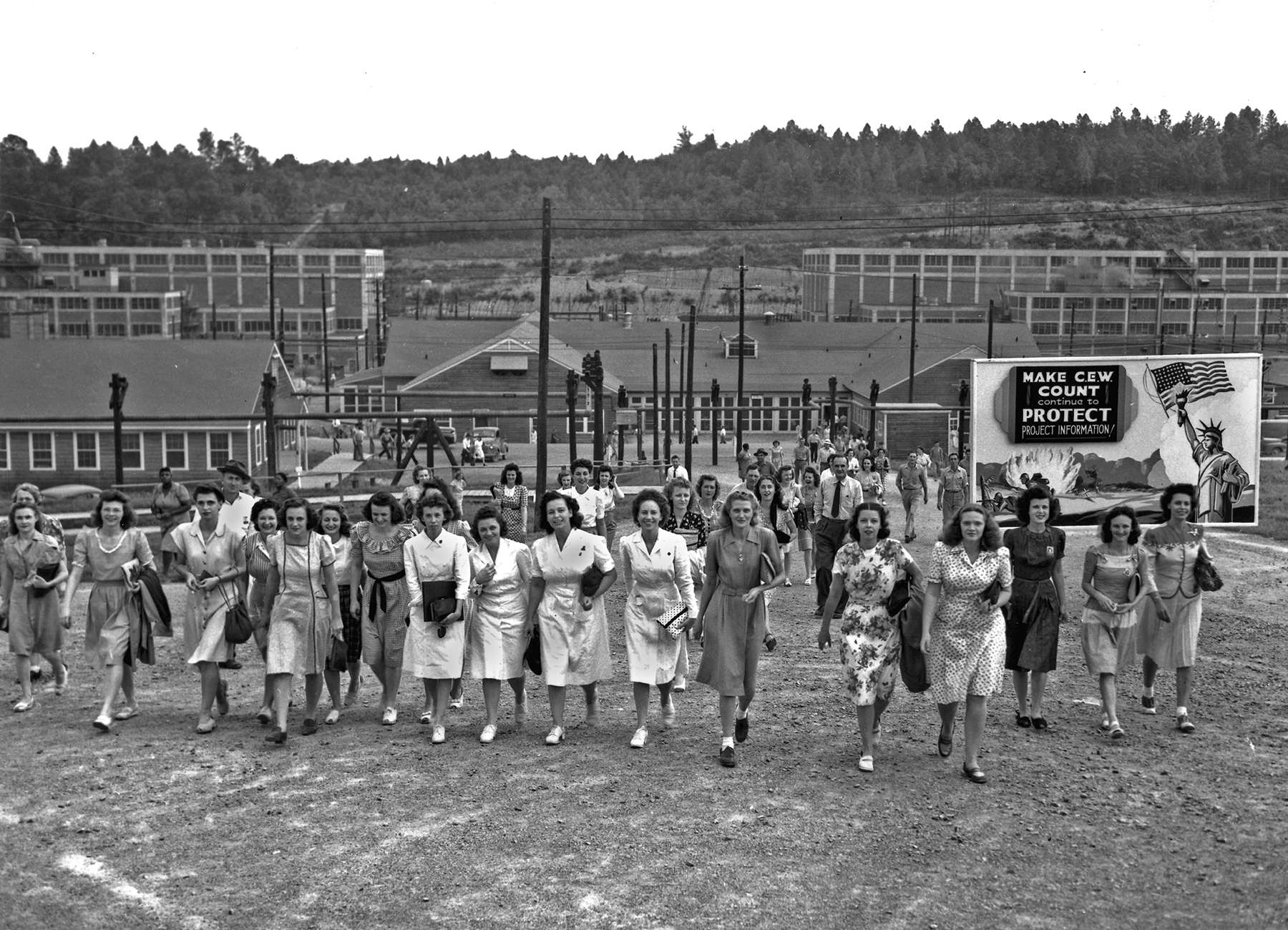
Workers leaving the Manhattan Project's Y-12 plant on 11 August 1945

The Clinton Engineer Works (CEW) was the production installation of the Manhattan Project that during World War II produced the enriched uranium used in the 1945 bombing of Hiroshima, as well as the first examples of reactor-produced plutonium. It consisted of production facilities arranged at three major sites, various utilities including a power plant, and the town of Oak Ridge. It was in East Tennessee, about 18 miles (29 km) west of Knoxville, and was named after the town of Clinton, eight miles (13 km) to the north. The production facilities were mainly in Roane County, and the northern part of the site was in Anderson County. The Manhattan District Engineer, Kenneth Nichols, moved the Manhattan District headquarters from Manhattan to Oak Ridge in August 1943. During the war, CEW's advanced research was managed for the government by the University of Chicago.

Construction workers were housed in a community known as Happy Valley. Built by the Army Corps of Engineers in 1943, this temporary community housed 15,000 people. The township of Oak Ridge was established to house the production staff. The operating force peaked at 50,000 workers just after the end of the war. The construction labor force peaked at 75,000, and the combined employment peak was 80,000. The town was developed by the federal government as a segregated community; Black Americans lived only in an area known as Gamble Valley, in government-built "hutments" (one-room shacks) on the south side of what is now Tuskegee Drive.

== Site selection ==
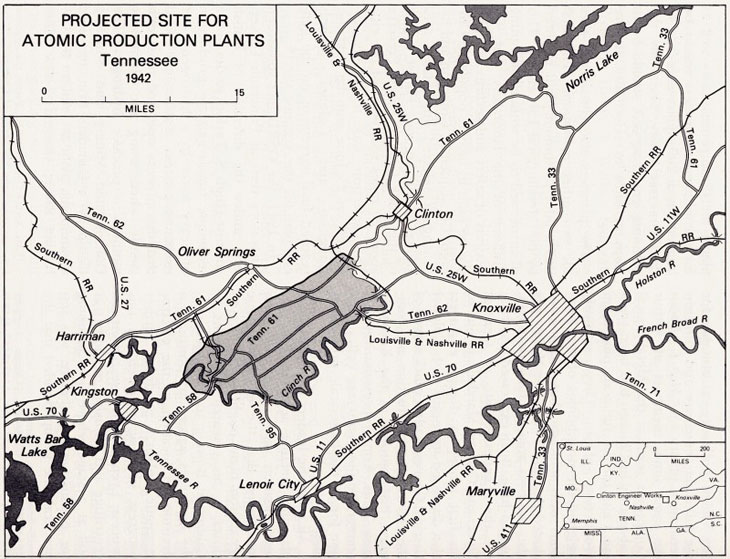
Projected Site for Atomic Production Plants, 1942

In 1942, the Manhattan Project was attempting to construct the first atomic bombs. This would require production facilities, and by June 1942 the project had reached the stage where their construction could be contemplated. On 25 June, the Office of Scientific Research and Development (OSRD) S-1 Executive Committee deliberated on where they should be located. Brigadier General Wilhelm D. Styer recommended that the different manufacturing facilities be built at the same site in order to simplify security and construction. Such a site would require a substantial tract of land to accommodate both the facilities and housing for the thousands of workers. The plutonium processing plant needed to be two to four miles (3.2 to 6.4 km) from the site boundary and any other installation, in case radioactive fission products escaped. While security and safety concerns suggested a remote site, it still needed to be near sources of labor and accessible by road and rail transportation. A mild climate that allowed construction to proceed throughout the year was desirable. Terrain separated by ridges would reduce the impact of accidental explosions, but they could not be so steep as to complicate construction. The substratum needed to be firm enough to provide good foundations but not so rocky that it would hinder excavation work. It was estimated that the proposed plants would need access to 150,000 kW of electrical power and 370,000 US gallons (1,400,000 L) of water per minute. A War Department policy held that, as a rule, munitions facilities should not be located west of the Sierra or Cascade Ranges, east of the Appalachian Mountains, or within 200 miles (320 km) of the Canadian or Mexican borders.

Several sites were considered in the Tennessee Valley, two in the Chicago area, one near the Shasta Dam in California, and some in Washington state, where the Hanford Site was eventually established. An OSRD team had selected the Knoxville area in April 1942, and in May Arthur Compton, the director of the University of Chicago's Metallurgical Laboratory, had met with Gordon R. Clapp, the general manager of the Tennessee Valley Authority (TVA). The Chief Engineer of the Manhattan District (MED), Colonel James C. Marshall, asked Colonel Leslie R. Groves Jr. to undertake a study within the Army's Office of the Chief of Engineers. After receiving assurances that the TVA could supply the required quantity of electric power if given priority for procuring some needed equipment, Groves also concluded that the Knoxville area was suitable. The only voice of dissent at the 25 June meeting was Ernest O. Lawrence, who wanted the electromagnetic separation plant located much nearer to his Radiation Laboratory in California. The Shasta Dam area remained under consideration for the electromagnetic plant until September, by which time Lawrence had dropped his objection.

On 1 July, Marshall and his deputy, Lieutenant Colonel Kenneth Nichols, surveyed sites in the Knoxville area with representatives of the TVA and Stone & Webster, the designated construction contractor. No perfectly suitable site was found, and Marshall even ordered another survey of the Spokane, Washington area. At the time, the proposed nuclear reactor, gas centrifuge and gaseous diffusion technologies were still in the research stage, and the design of the plant was a long way off. The schedules—which called for construction work on the nuclear reactor to commence by 1 October 1942, the electromagnetic plant by 1 November, the centrifugal plant by 1 January 1943, and the gaseous diffusion plant by 1 March—were unrealistic. While work could not commence on the plants, a start could be made on the housing and administrative buildings. Stone & Webster therefore drew up a detailed report on the most promising site west of Knoxville. Stephane Groueff later wrote:

This portion of the quiet rural area was called Black Oak Ridge and was the northernmost of five principal oak- and pine-covered ridges around the meandering Clinch River. It was a verdant, beautiful countryside with rolling hills covered with dogwood and full of partridge and deer. To the east were the Great Smoky Mountains, to the west the peaks of the Cumberland Mountains.

The site was located in Roane County and Anderson County and lay roughly halfway between the two county seats of Kingston and Clinton. Its greatest drawback was that a major road, Tennessee State Route 61, ran through it. Stone & Webster considered the possibility of re-routing the road. The Ohio River Division of the Corps of Engineers estimated that it would cost $4.25 million (equivalent to $64.3 million in 2024) to purchase the entire 83,000-acre (34,000 ha) site.

Groves became the director of the Manhattan Project on 23 September, with the rank of brigadier general. That afternoon, he took a train to Knoxville, where he met with Marshall. After touring the site, Groves concluded that the site "was an even better choice than I had anticipated". He called Colonel John J. O'Brien of the Corps of Engineers' Real Estate Branch and told him to proceed with acquiring the land. The site was initially known as the Kingston Demolition Range; it officially became the Clinton Engineer Works (CEW) in January 1943 and was given the codename Site X. After the township was established in mid-1943, the name Oak Ridge was chosen from employee suggestions. The site met the Manhattan District's approval because "its rural connotation held outside curiosity to a minimum". Oak Ridge then became the site's postal address, but the site was not officially renamed Oak Ridge until 1947.

== Land acquisition ==
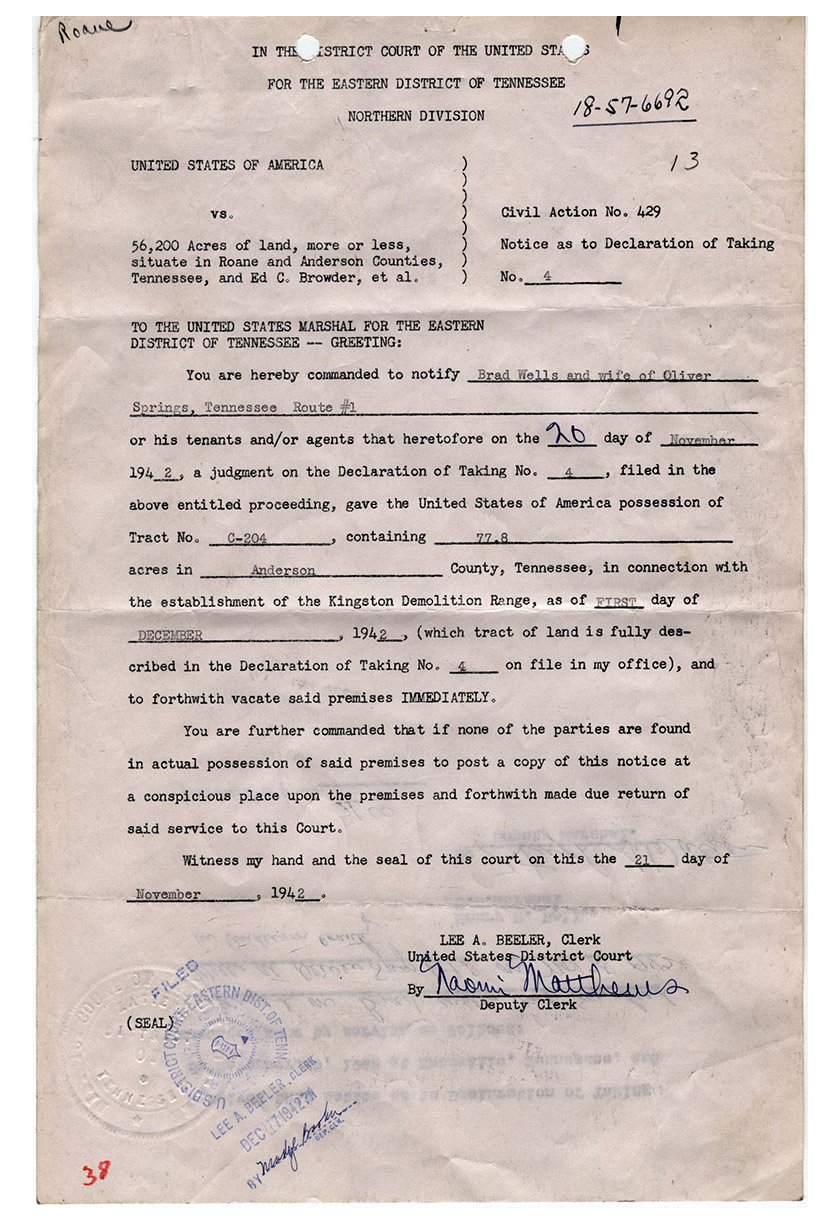
A notice to landowners that their land was now in the possession of the federal government and that they had to vacate the premises

Although War Department policy maintained that land should be acquired by direct purchase, time was short and thus it was decided to proceed immediately with condemnation. This allowed access to the site for construction crews, provided faster compensation to the owners, and expedited the handling of property with defective titles. On 28 September 1942, the ORD Real Estate Branch opened a project office in Harriman with a staff of 54 surveyors, appraisers, lawyers and office workers. The ORD Real Estate Branch was quite busy at this time, as it was also acquiring land for the Dale Hollow Reservoir, so some staff were borrowed from the Federal Land Bank and the TVA. The next day, Under Secretary of War Robert P. Patterson authorized the acquisition of 56,000 acres (23,000 ha) at an estimated cost of $3.5 million (equivalent to $53 million in 2024). At the request of the ORD Real Estate Branch attorneys, the District Court for the Eastern District of Tennessee issued an order of possession on 6 October, effective the next day. Recognizing the hardship that it would cause to the landowners, it restricted immediate exclusive possession to properties "essential to full and complete development of the project".

Over 1,000 families lived on the site on farms or in the hamlets of Elza, Robertsville, and Scarboro. The first that most heard about the acquisition was when a representative from the ORD visited to inform them that their land was being acquired. Some returned home from work one day to find an eviction notice nailed to their door or to a tree in the yard. Most were given six weeks to leave, but some were given just two. The government took possession of 13 tracts for immediate construction work on 20 November 1942. By May 1943, 742 declarations had been filed covering 53,334 acres (21,584 ha). Most residents were told to prepare to leave between 1 December and 15 January. In cases where this would cause undue hardship, the MED allowed residents to stay beyond this date. For some it was the third time that they had been evicted by the government, having previously been evicted for the Great Smoky Mountains National Park in the 1920s and the TVA's Norris Dam in the 1930s. Many expected that, like the TVA, the Army would provide assistance to help them relocate; but unlike the TVA, the Army had no mission to improve the area or the lot of the local people, and thus no funds had been allocated for the purpose. Tires were in short supply in wartime America, and moving vehicles were difficult to find. Some residents had to leave behind possessions that they were unable to take with them.

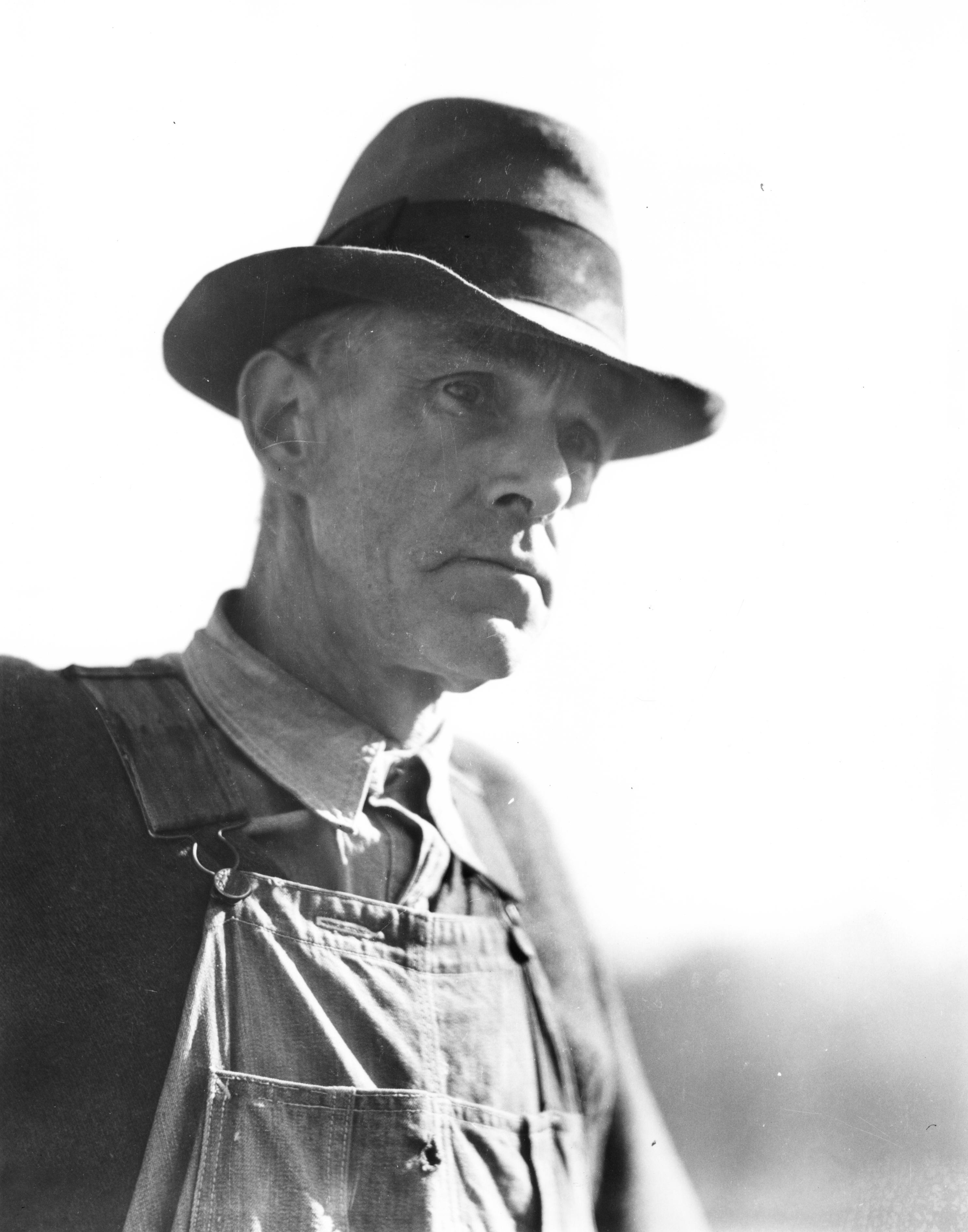
A. L. Robinette, one of the farmers dispossessed by the compulsory acquisition of his land

A delegation of landowners presented the ORD Real Estate Branch with a petition protesting the acquisition of their property on 23 November 1942, and that night over 200 landowners held a meeting at which they agreed to hire lawyers and appraisers to challenge the federal government. Local newspapers and politicians were sympathetic to their cause. By the end of May 1943, agreements were reached covering 416 tracts totaling 21,742 acres (8,799 ha), but some landowners rejected the government's offers. The ORD Real Estate Branch invoked a procedure under Tennessee law that allowed for a jury of five citizens appointed by the federal district court to review the compensations offered. They handled five cases in which they proposed higher values than those of the ORD appraisers, but the landowners rejected them as well, so the Army discontinued the use of this method. In response to rising public criticism, O'Brien commissioned a review by the Department of Agriculture. It found that the appraisals had been fair and just, and that farmers had overestimated the size and productivity of their land.

The landowners turned to their local Congressman, John Jennings, Jr. On 1 February 1943, Jennings introduced a resolution in the House of Representatives calling for a committee to investigate the values offered to the landowners. He also complained to Patterson that buildings and facilities were being demolished by the MED. On 9 July, Andrew J. May, the chairman of the House Committee on Military Affairs, appointed an investigating subcommittee chaired by Tennessee Representative Clifford Davis, who selected Dewey Short of Missouri and John Sparkman of Alabama as its other members. Public hearings were held in Clinton on 11 August and in Kingston the following day. The committee report, presented in December 1943, made a number of specific recommendations concerning the Corps of Engineers' land acquisition process, but neither Congress nor the War Department moved to provide additional compensation for the landowners.

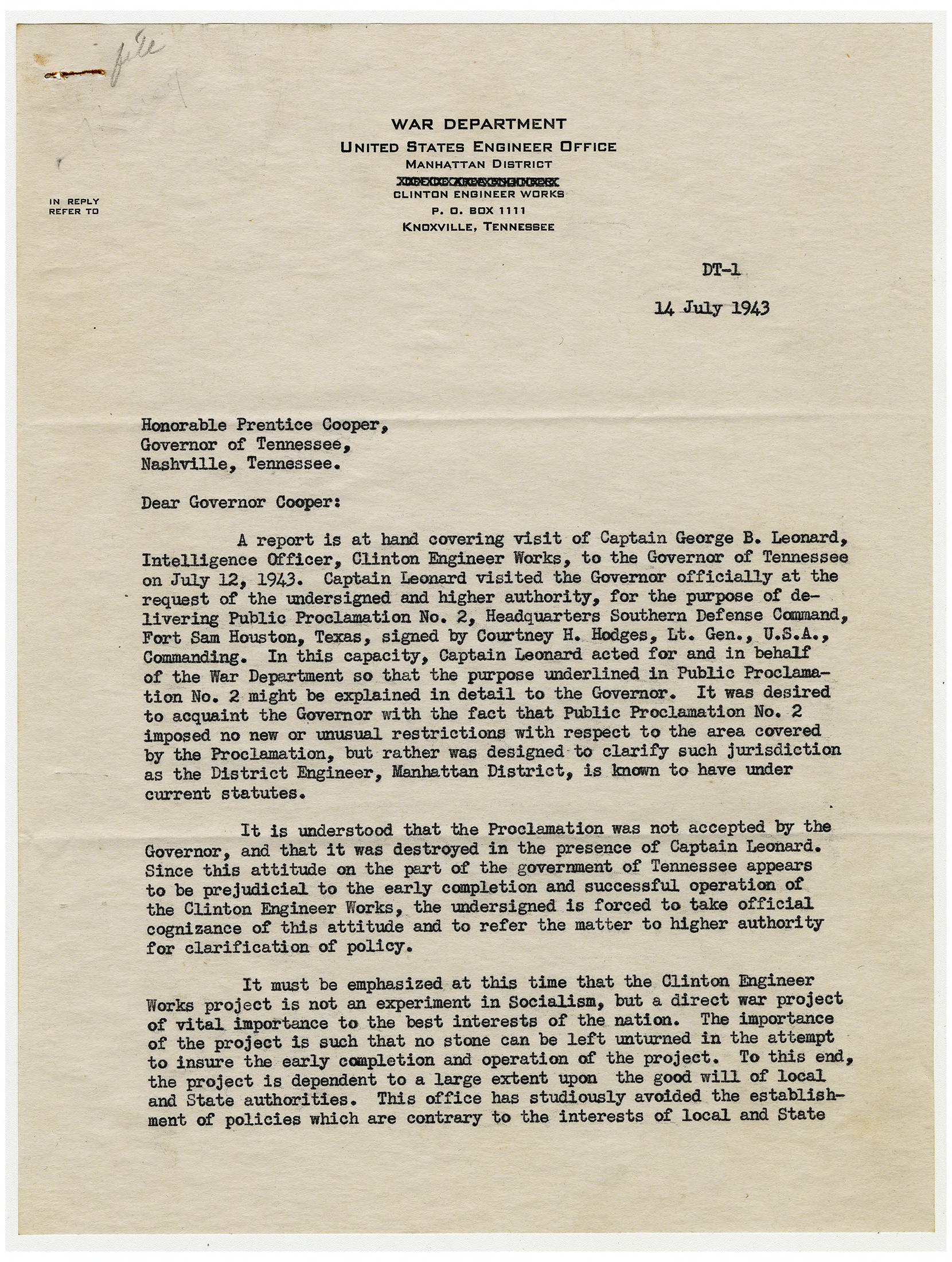
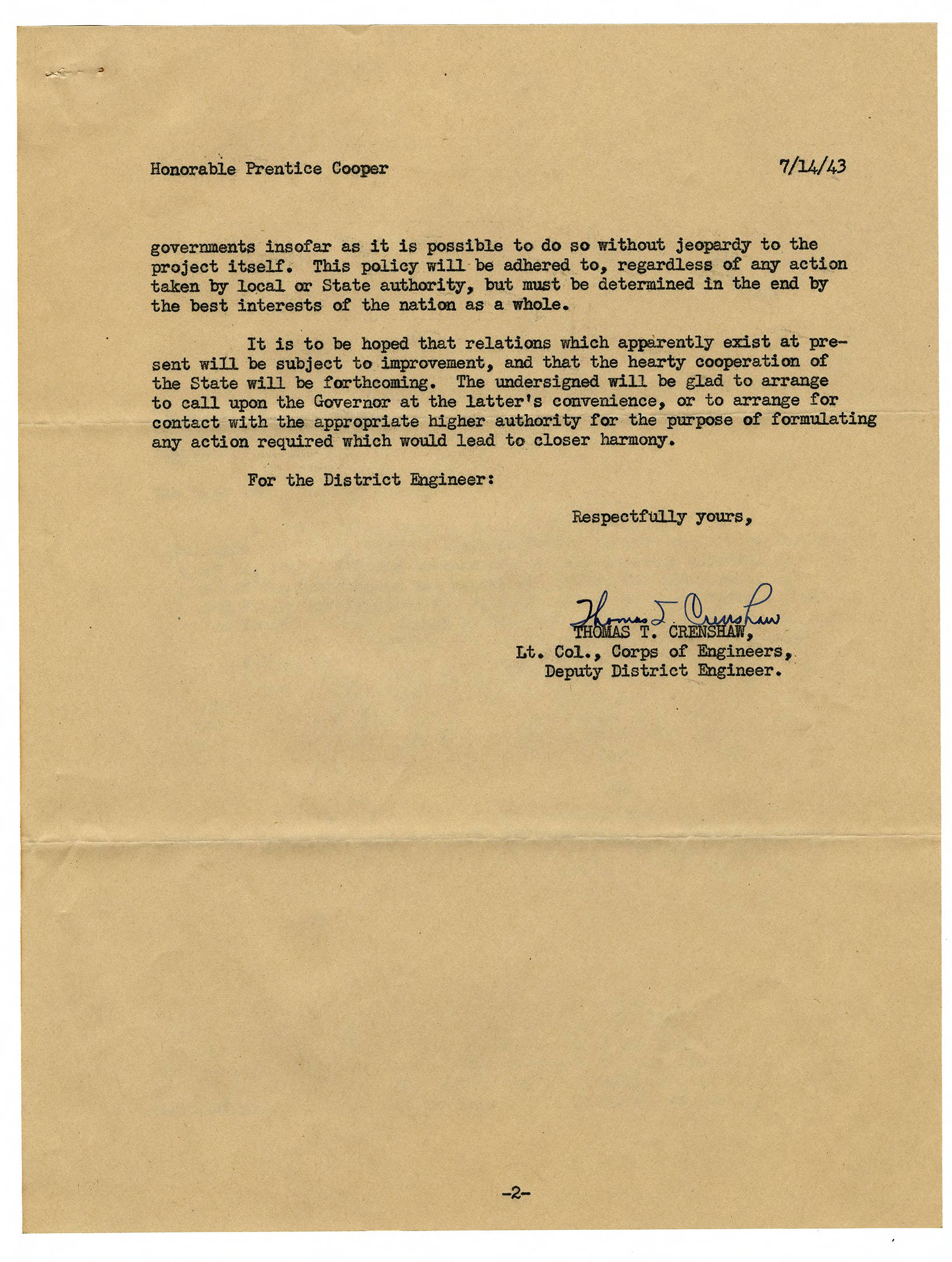
Letter dated 14 July 1943 to Governor Prentice Cooper from Lieutenant Colonel Thomas T. Crenshaw. Crenshaw references an incident in which Cooper is reported to have angrily torn up President Roosevelt's Public Proclamation No. 2 that designated Clinton Engineer Works as total exclusion area no longer under state control.

In July 1943, Groves prepared to issue Public Proclamation No. 2, declaring the site a military exclusion area. He asked Marshall to present it to Governor of Tennessee Prentice Cooper. Marshall, in turn, delegated the task to the area engineer, Major Thomas T. Crenshaw, who sent a junior officer, Captain George B. Leonard. Cooper was unimpressed; he told Leonard that he had not been informed about the purpose of the CEW and that the Army had kicked the farmers off their land and had not compensated the counties for the roads and bridges which would be closed. In his opinion it was "an experiment in socialism", a New Deal project being undertaken in the name of the war effort. Instead of reading the proclamation, he tore it up and threw it in a waste paper basket. Marshall went to Nashville to apologize to Cooper, who refused to talk to him. Nichols, who succeeded Marshall as chief engineer of the Manhattan District, met Cooper on 31 July and offered compensation in the form of federal financing for road improvements. Cooper accepted an offer from Nichols to visit the CEW, which he did on 3 November.

Nichols and Cooper came to an agreement about the Solway Bridge. Although it was in Knox County, Anderson County had contributed $27,000 towards its construction. Knox County was still paying off the bonds, but the bridge was no longer accessible to the county and was usable only by CEW workers. Nichols negotiated a deal in which Knox County was paid $25,000 annually for the bridge, of which $6,000 was to be used to maintain the access road. County Judge Thomas L. Seeber then threatened to close the Edgemoor Bridge unless Anderson County was similarly compensated. An agreement was reached under which Anderson County received $10,000 for the bridge and $200 per month. Knox County did not keep its side of the bargain to maintain the road, which was damaged by heavy traffic and became impassable after torrential rains in 1944. The Army was forced to spend $5,000 per month on road works in Knox County.

Additional parcels of land were acquired during 1943 and 1944 for access roads, a railway spur, and for security purposes, bringing the total to about 58,900 acres (23,800 ha). The Harriman office closed on 10 June 1944 but reopened on 1 September to deal with the additional parcels. The final acquisition was completed on 1 March 1945. The final cost of the land acquired was around $2.6 million (equivalent to $35.8 million in 2024), about $47 per acre ($120/ha).

== Facilities ==
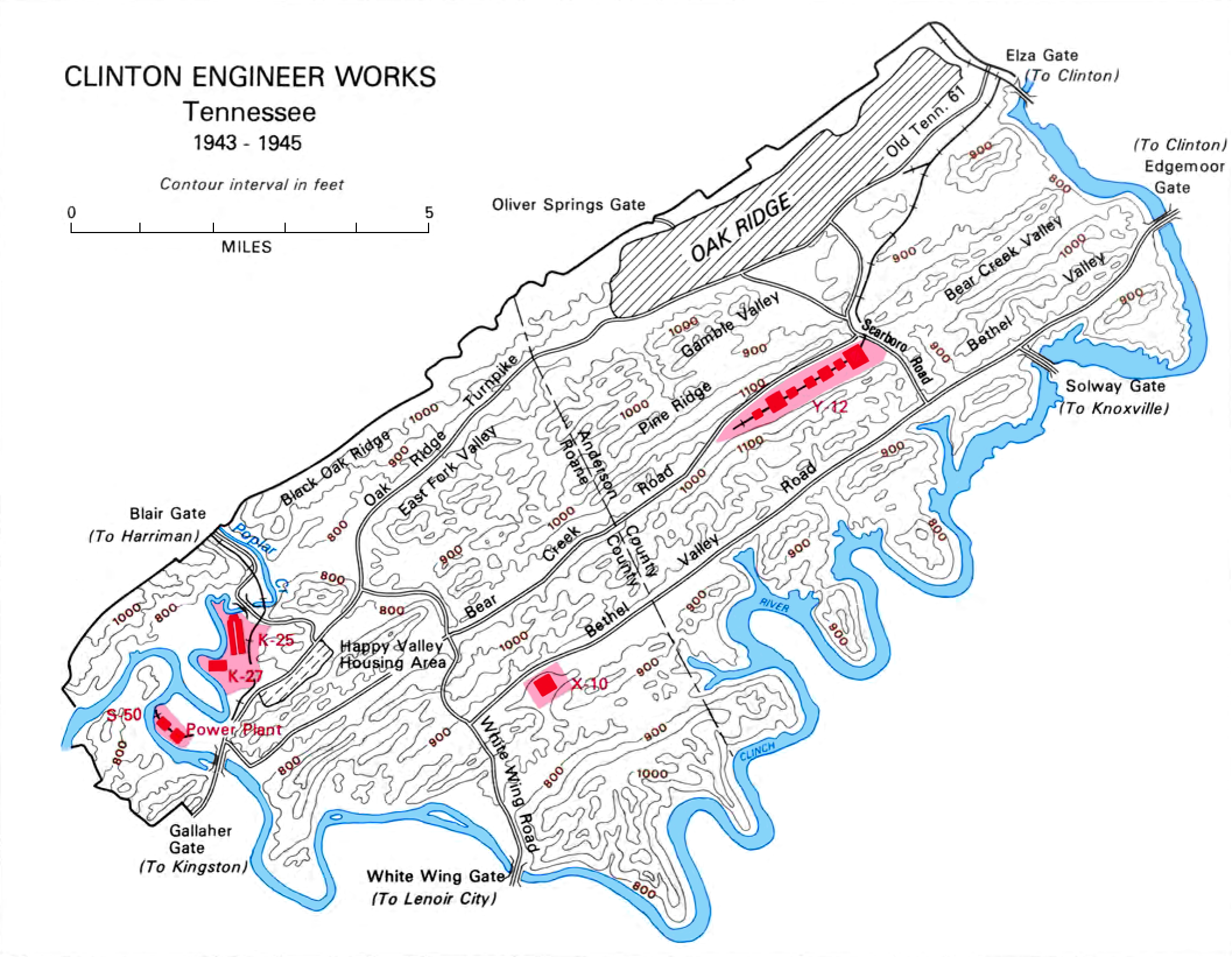
Oak Ridge. The Y-12 electromagnetic separation plant is in the upper right. The K-25 and K-27 gaseous diffusion plants are in the lower left, near the S-50 thermal diffusion plant. The X-10 is in the lower center.

=== X-10 graphite reactor ===
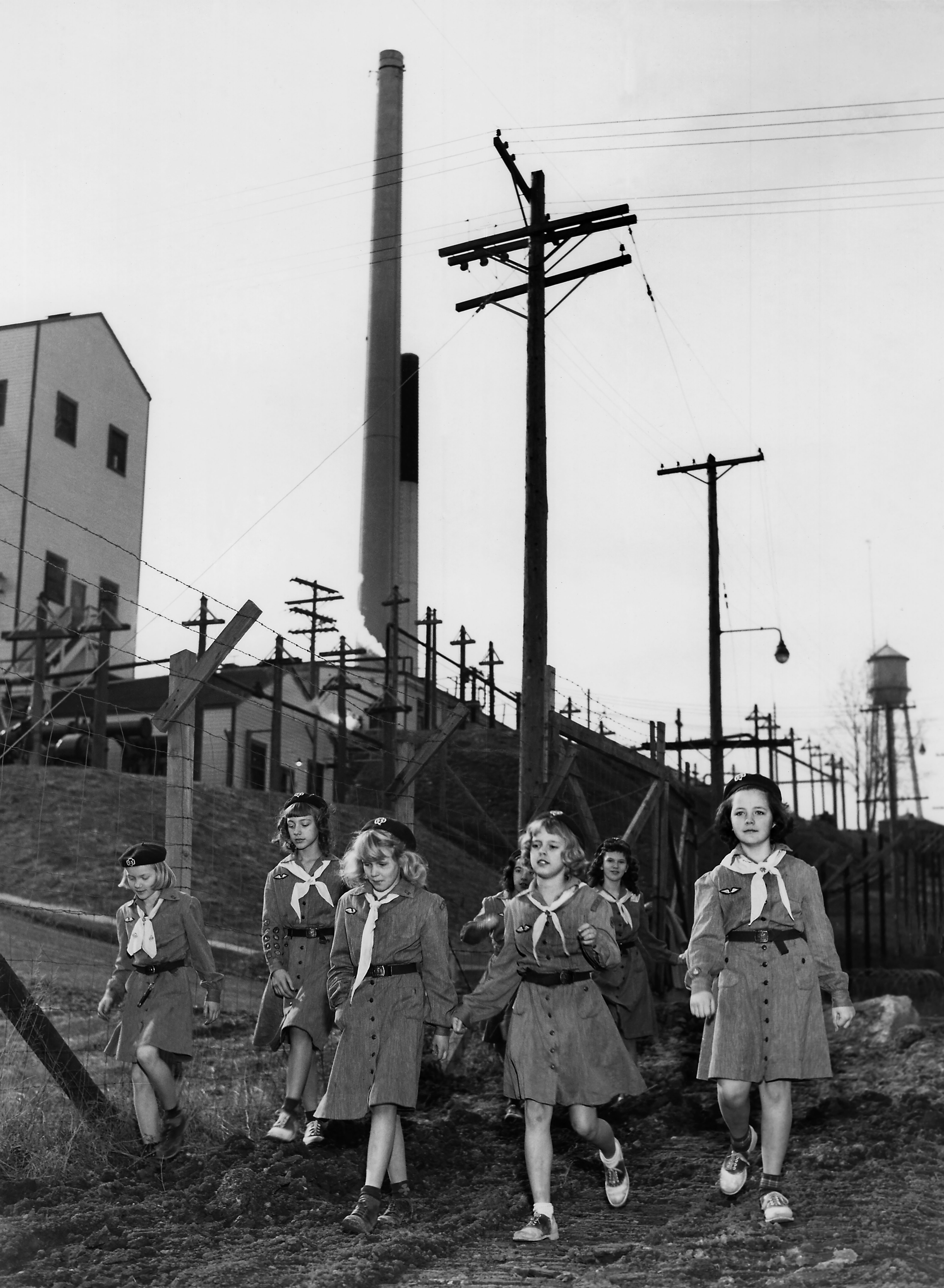
Girl scouts visit X-10. When the Girl Scout troop was formed in wartime Oak Ridge, girls were listed as coming from the Knoxville Girl Scout office, and were registered by their first names only, to safeguard their fathers' identities.

On 2 February 1943, DuPont began construction of the plutonium semiworks on an isolated 112-acre (0.5 km^{2}) site in Bethel Valley about 10 miles (16 km) southwest of Oak Ridge. Intended as a pilot plant for the larger production facilities at the Hanford Site, it included the air-cooled graphite-moderated X-10 Graphite Reactor. There was also a chemical separation plant, research laboratories, waste storage area, training facility for Hanford staff, and administrative and support facilities that included a laundry, cafeteria, first aid center and fire station. Because of the subsequent decision to construct water-cooled reactors at Hanford, only the chemical separation plant operated as a true pilot. The facility was known as the Clinton Laboratories and was operated by the University of Chicago as part of the Metallurgical Laboratory project.

The X-10 Graphite Reactor was the world's second artificial nuclear reactor after Enrico Fermi's Chicago Pile-1 and was the first reactor designed and built for continuous operation. It consisted of a block, 24 feet (7.3 m) long on each side, of nuclear graphite cubes, weighing around 1,500 short tons (1,400 t), surrounded by seven feet (2.1 m) of high-density concrete as a radiation shield. There were 36 horizontal rows of 35 holes. Behind each was a metal channel into which uranium fuel slugs could be inserted. The cooling system was driven by three large electric fans.

Construction work on the reactor had to wait until DuPont had completed the design. Excavation commenced on 27 April 1943, but a large pocket of soft clay was discovered, necessitating additional foundations. Further delays occurred from wartime difficulties in procuring building materials. There was also an acute shortage of common and skilled labor: the contractor had only three-quarters of the required workforce, and less after high turnover and absenteeism, mainly the result of poor accommodations and difficulties in commuting. The township of Oak Ridge was still under construction, and barracks were built to house workers. Special arrangements with individual workers increased their morale and reduced turnover. Further delays were caused by unusually heavy rainfall, with 9.3 inches (240 mm) falling in July 1943, more than twice the average of 4.3 inches (110 mm).

700 short tons (640 t) of graphite blocks were purchased from National Carbon, and the construction crews began stacking it in September 1943. Cast uranium billets came from Metal Hydrides, Mallinckrodt and other suppliers. These were extruded into cylindrical slugs and canned by Alcoa, which started production on 14 June 1943. General Electric and the Metallurgical Laboratory developed a new welding technique; the new equipment was installed in the production line at Alcoa in October 1943. Supervised by Compton, Martin D. Whitaker and Fermi, the reactor went critical on 4 November with about 30 short tons (27 t) of uranium. A week later the load was increased to 36 short tons (33 t), raising its power generation to 500 kW, and by the end of the month the first 500 mg of plutonium was created. Modifications over time raised the power to 4,000 kW in July 1944.

Construction commenced on the pilot separation plant before a chemical process for separating plutonium from uranium had been selected. In May 1943, DuPont managers decided to use the bismuth phosphate process. The plant consisted of six cells, separated from each other and the control room by thick concrete walls. The equipment was operated remotely from the control room. Construction work was completed on 26 November, but the plant could not operate until the reactor started producing irradiated uranium slugs. The first batch was received on 20 December, allowing the first plutonium to be produced in early 1944. By February, the reactor was irradiating a ton of uranium every three days. Over the next five months, the efficiency of the separation process was improved, with the percentage of plutonium recovered increasing from 40 to 90 percent. X-10 operated as a plutonium production plant until January 1945, when it was turned over to research activities. By this time, 299 batches of irradiated slugs had been processed.

In September 1942, Compton asked Whitaker to form a skeleton operating staff for X-10. Whitaker became director of the Clinton Laboratories, and the first permanent operating staff arrived at X-10 from the Metallurgical Laboratory in Chicago in April 1944, by which time DuPont began transferring its technicians to the site. They were augmented by one hundred technicians in uniform from the Army's Special Engineer Detachment. By March 1944, there were 1,500 people working at X-10.

A radioisotope building, a steam plant, and other structures were added in April 1946 to support the laboratory's peacetime educational and research missions. All work was completed by December, adding another $1,009,000 (equivalent to $12.3 million in 2024) to the cost of construction at X-10 and bringing the total cost to $13,041,000 (equivalent to $159 million in 2024). Operational costs added $22,250,000 (equivalent to $272 million in 2024).

=== Y-12 electromagnetic separation plant ===
Electromagnetic isotope separation was developed by Lawrence at the University of California Radiation Laboratory. This method employed devices known as calutrons, a hybrid of the standard laboratory mass spectrometer and cyclotron. The name was derived from the words "California", "university" and "cyclotron". In the electromagnetic separation process, a magnetic field deflects charged uranium particles according to mass. The process was neither scientifically elegant nor industrially efficient. Compared with a gaseous diffusion plant or a nuclear reactor, an electromagnetic separation plant would consume more scarce materials, require more manpower to operate, and cost more to build. The process was approved because it was based on proven technology and therefore represented less risk. It could be built in stages and rapidly reach industrial capacity.

Operators at their calutron control panels at Y-12. Gladys Owens, the woman seated in the foreground, did not know what she had been involved with until seeing this photo in a public tour of the facility 50 years later.

Responsibility for the design and construction of the electromagnetic separation plant, which came to be called Y-12, was assigned to Stone & Webster by the S-1 Committee in June 1942. The design called for five first-stage processing units, known as Alpha racetracks, and two units for final processing, known as Beta racetracks. In September, Groves authorized construction of four more racetracks, known as Alpha II. Construction began in February 1943.

When the plant was started up for testing on schedule in November, the 14-ton vacuum tanks crept out of alignment because of the power of the magnets and had to be fastened more securely. A more serious problem arose when the magnetic coils started shorting out. In December, Groves ordered a magnet broken open, and handfuls of rust were found inside. Groves then ordered the racetracks to be torn down and the magnets sent back to the factory to be cleaned. A pickling plant was established on-site to clean the pipes and fittings. The second Alpha I became operational near the end of January 1944; the first Beta and first and third Alpha I's came online in March, and the fourth Alpha I became operational in April. The four Alpha II racetracks were completed between July and October 1944.

Tennessee Eastman was hired to manage Y-12 on the usual cost-plus fixed fee basis, with a fee of $22,500 per month plus $7,500 per racetrack for the first seven racetracks and $4,000 per additional racetrack. The calutrons were initially operated by scientists from Berkeley to remove bugs and achieve a reasonable operating rate. They were then turned over to trained Tennessee Eastman operators who had only a high school education. Nichols compared unit production data and pointed out to Lawrence that the young "hillbilly" girl operators, known as Calutron Girls, were outperforming his doctorate-level scientists. They agreed to a production race and Lawrence lost, a morale boost for the Tennessee Eastman workers and supervisors. The girls were "trained like soldiers not to reason why", while "the scientists could not refrain from time-consuming investigation of the cause of even minor fluctuations of the dials".

Y-12 initially enriched the uranium-235 content to between 13 and 15 percent and shipped the first few hundred grams of this to the Manhattan Project's weapons design laboratory, the Los Alamos Laboratory, in March 1944. Only 1 part in 5,825 of the uranium feed emerged as final product; much of the rest was splattered over equipment in the process. Strenuous recovery efforts helped raise production to 10 percent of the uranium-235 feed by January 1945. In February the Alpha racetracks began receiving slightly enriched (1.4 percent) feed from the S-50 thermal diffusion plant, and the next month it received enhanced (5 percent) feed from the K-25 gaseous diffusion plant. By August K-25 was producing uranium sufficiently enriched to feed directly into the Beta tracks.

The Alpha tracks began to suspend operations on 4 September 1945 and ceased operation completely on 22 September. The last two Beta tracks went into full operation in November and December, processing feed from K-25 and K-27. By May 1946, studies suggested that the gaseous plants could fully enrich the uranium by themselves without accidentally creating a critical mass. After a trial showed this was the case, Groves ordered all but one Beta track at Y-12 shut down in December 1946. Y-12 remained in use for nuclear weapons processing and materials storage. A production facility for the hydrogen bomb used in Operation Castle in 1954 was hastily installed in 1952.

=== K-25 gaseous diffusion plant ===
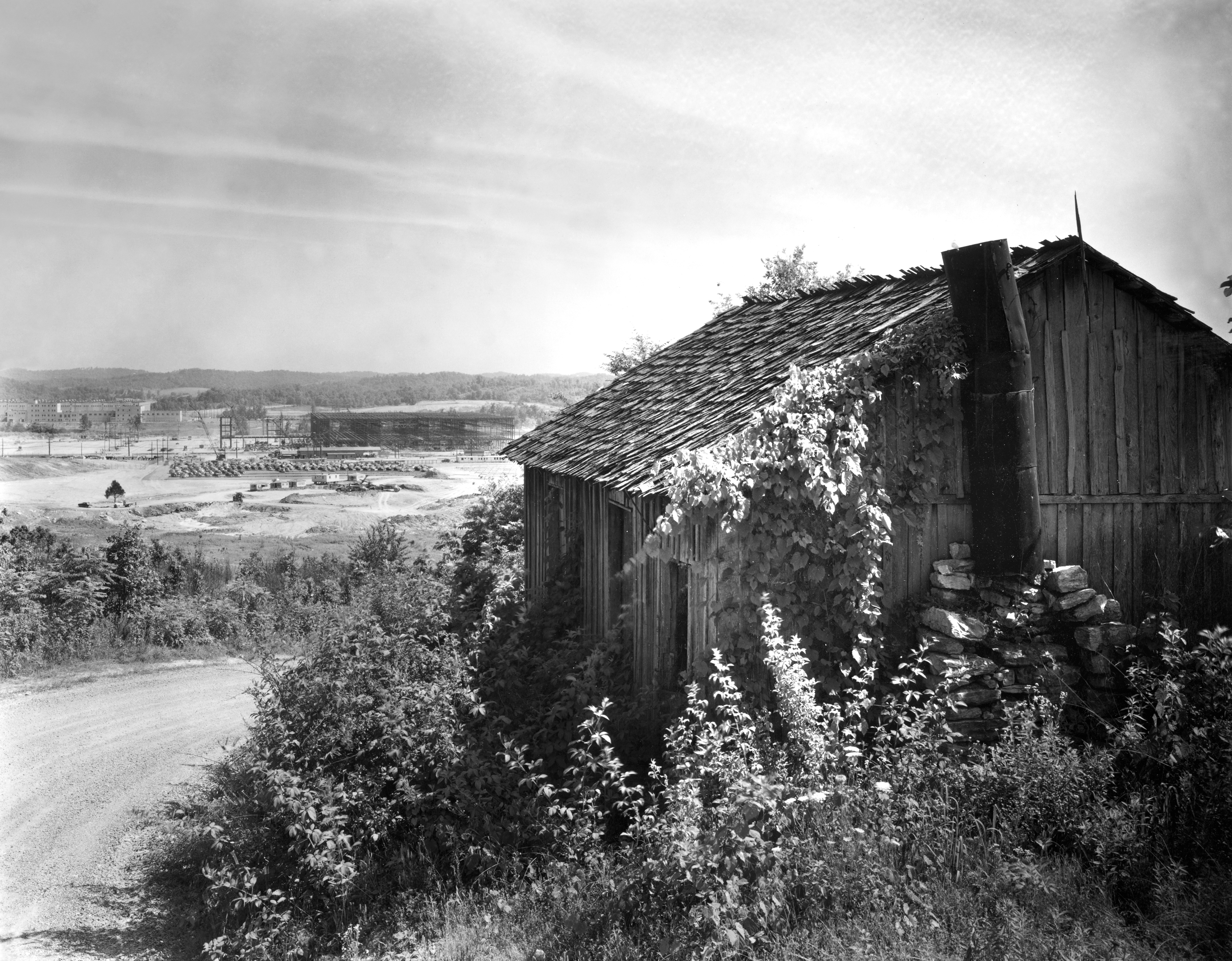
One of the original houses overlooking the construction of K-25

The most promising but also the most challenging method of isotope separation was gaseous diffusion. Graham's law states that the rate of effusion of a gas is inversely proportional to the square root of its molecular mass, so in a box containing a semi-permeable membrane and a mixture of two gases, the lighter molecules will pass out of the container more rapidly than the heavier molecules. The gas leaving the container is somewhat enriched in the lighter molecules, while the residual gas is somewhat depleted. The idea was that such boxes could be formed into a cascade of pumps and membranes, with each successive stage containing a slightly more enriched mixture. Research into the process was carried out at Columbia University by a group that included Harold Urey, Karl P. Cohen and John R. Dunning.

In November 1942 the Military Policy Committee approved the construction of a 600-stage gaseous diffusion plant. On 14 December, M. W. Kellogg accepted an offer to construct the plant, which was codenamed K-25. A cost-plus fixed fee contract was negotiated, eventually totaling $2.5 million (equivalent to $37.8 million in 2024). A separate corporate entity called Kellex was created for the project, headed by Percival C. Keith, one of Kellogg's vice presidents. The process faced formidable technical difficulties. The highly corrosive gas uranium hexafluoride had to be used, as no substitute could be found, and the motors and pumps would have to be vacuum tight and enclosed in inert gas. The biggest problem was the design of the barrier, which would have to be strong, porous and resistant to corrosion by uranium hexafluoride. The best choice for this seemed to be nickel, and Edward Adler and Edward Norris created a mesh barrier from electroplated nickel. A six-stage pilot plant was built at Columbia to test the process, but the Norris-Adler prototype proved to be too brittle. A rival barrier was developed from powdered nickel by Kellex, the Bell Telephone Laboratories and the Bakelite Corporation. In January 1944, Groves ordered the Kellex barrier into production.

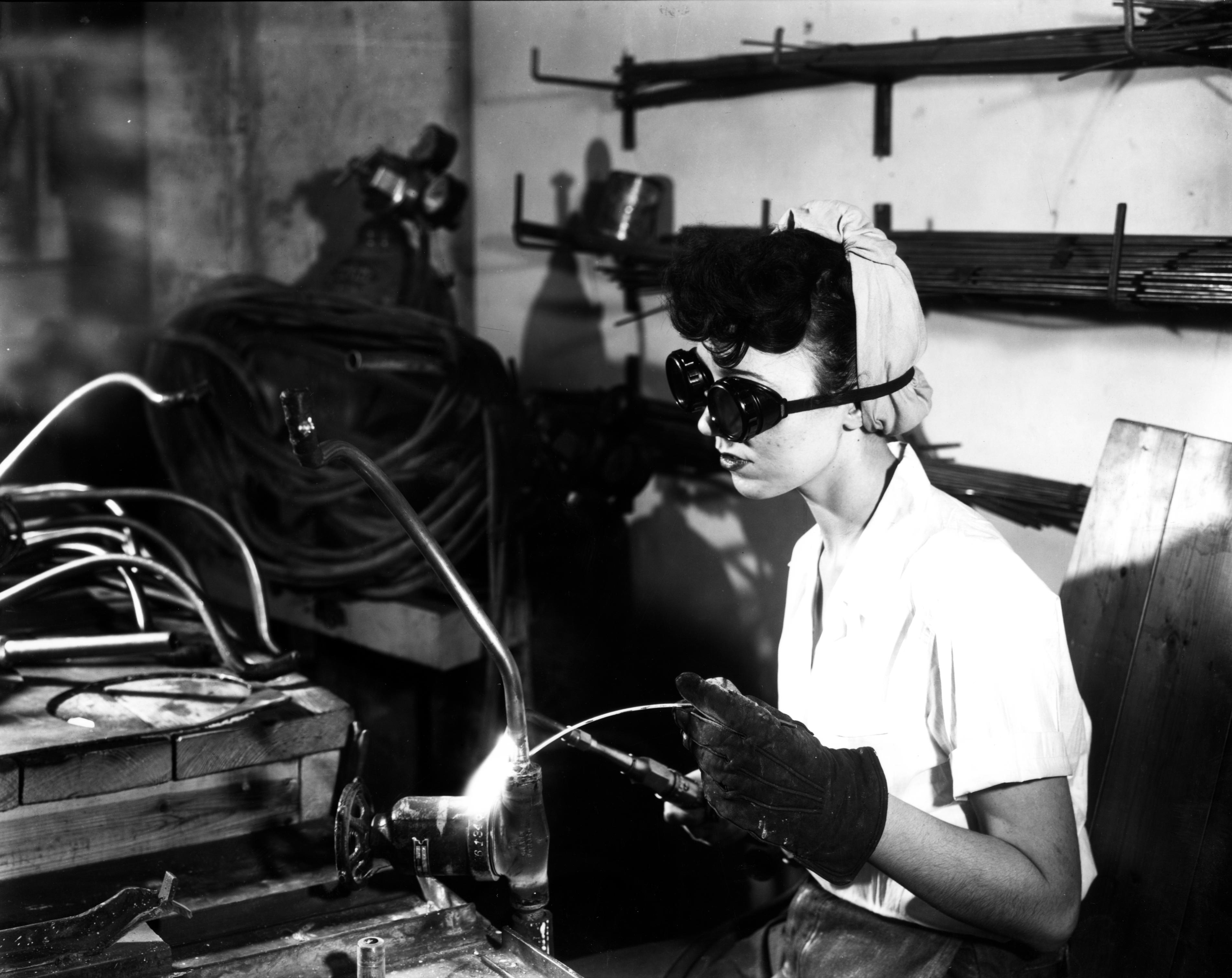
Welder at K-25

Kellex's design for K-25 called for a four-story U-shaped structure 0.5 miles (0.80 km) long containing 54 contiguous buildings. These were divided into nine sections. Within these were cells of six stages. The cells could be operated independently or consecutively within a section. Similarly, the sections could be operated separately or as part of a single cascade. A survey party began construction by marking out the 500-acre (2.0 km^{2}) site in May 1943. Work on the main building began in October, and the six-stage pilot plant was ready for operation on 17 April 1944. In 1945 Groves canceled the upper stages of the plant, directing Kellex to instead design and build a 540-stage side feed unit, which became known as K-27. Kellex transferred the last unit to the operating contractor, Union Carbide and Carbon, on 11 September 1945. The total cost, including the K-27 plant completed after the war, came to $480 million (equivalent to $6.61 billion in 2024).

The production plant commenced operation in February 1945, and as cascade after cascade came online, the quality of the product increased. By April, K-25 had attained a 1.1 percent enrichment and the output of the S-50 thermal diffusion plant began being used as feed. Some product produced the next month reached nearly 7 percent enrichment. In August, the last of the 2,892 stages commenced operation. K-25 and K-27 achieved their full potential in the early postwar period, when they eclipsed the other production plants and became the prototypes for a new generation of plants. Uranium was enriched by the K-25 gaseous diffusion process until 1985; the plants were then decommissioned and decontaminated. A 235 MW coal-fired power station was included for reliability and to provide variable frequency, although most electric power came from the TVA.

=== S-50 liquid thermal diffusion plant ===
The thermal diffusion process was based on Sydney Chapman and David Enskog's theory, which explained that when a mixed gas passes through a temperature gradient, the heavier one tends to concentrate at the cold end and the lighter one at the warm end. Since hot gases tend to rise and cool ones tend to fall, this can be used as a means of isotope separation. This process was first demonstrated by Klaus Clusius and Gerhard Dickel in Germany in 1938. It was developed by US Navy scientists but was not one of the enrichment technologies initially selected for use in the Manhattan Project. This was primarily due to doubts about its technical feasibility, but the inter-service rivalry between the Army and Navy also played a part.

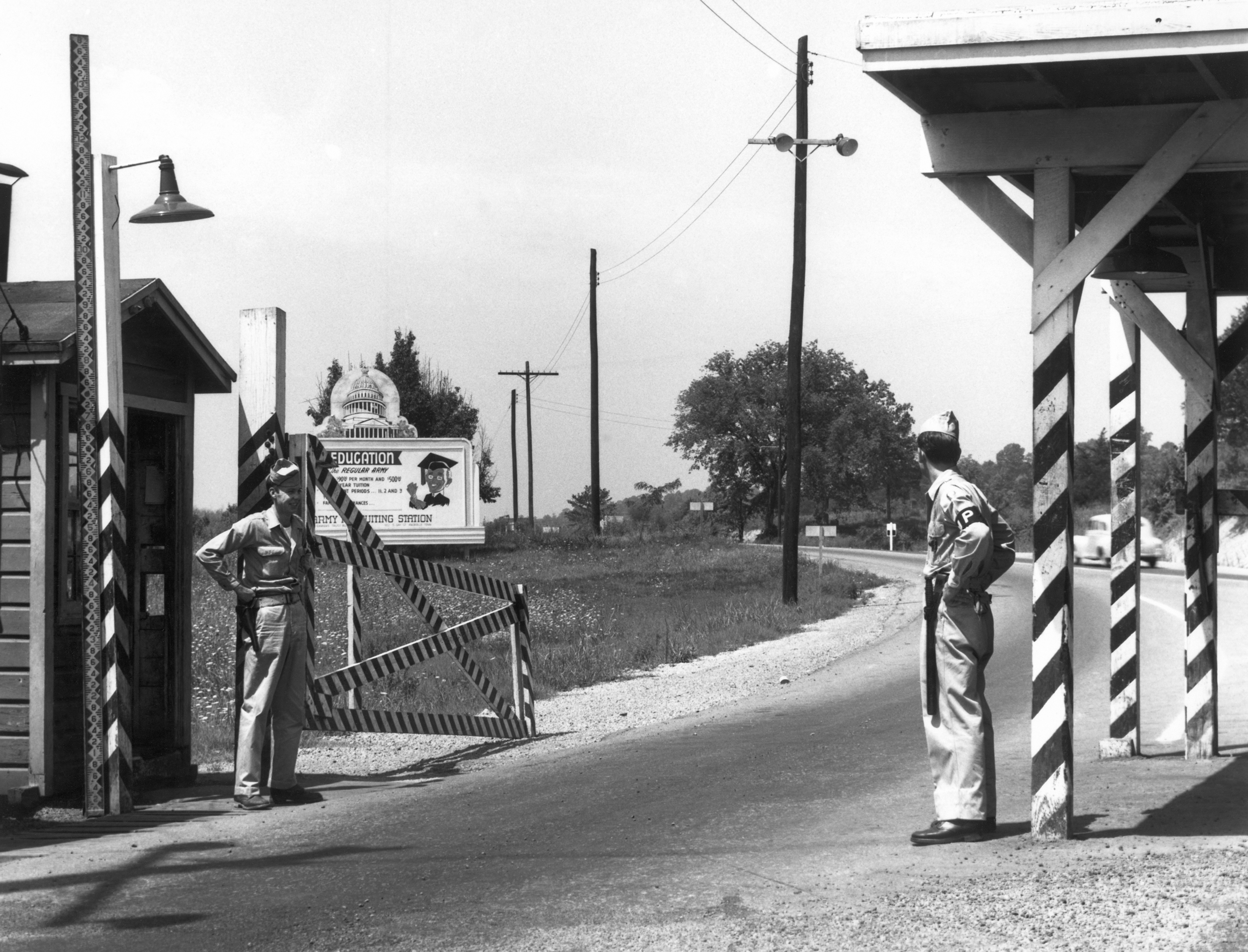
Guards at the Solway Gate in 1946

The Naval Research Laboratory continued the research under Philip Abelson's direction, but there was little contact with the Manhattan Project until April 1944, when Captain William S. Parsons (the naval officer in charge of ordnance development at Los Alamos) brought director Robert Oppenheimer news of encouraging progress in the Navy's experiments on thermal diffusion. Oppenheimer wrote to Groves suggesting that the output of a thermal diffusion plant could be fed into Y-12. Groves set up a committee consisting of Warren K. Lewis, Eger Murphree and Richard Tolman to investigate the idea, and they estimated that a thermal diffusion plant costing $3.5 million (equivalent to $49.4 million in 2024) could enrich 110 pounds (50 kg) of uranium per week to nearly 0.9 percent uranium-235. Groves approved its construction on 24 June 1944.

Groves contracted with the H. K. Ferguson Company of Cleveland to build the thermal diffusion plant, which was designated S-50. Groves' advisers, Karl Cohen and W. I. Thompson from Standard Oil, estimated that it would take six months to build; Groves gave Ferguson four months. Plans called for the installation of 2,142 forty-eight-foot-tall (15 m) diffusion columns arranged in 21 racks. Inside each column were three concentric tubes. Steam, obtained from the nearby K-25 powerhouse at a pressure of 100 pounds per square inch (690 kPa) and temperature of 545 °F (285 °C), flowed downward through the innermost 1.25-inch (32 mm) nickel pipe, while water at 155 °F (68 °C) flowed upward through the outermost iron pipe. Isotope separation occurred in the uranium hexafluoride gas between the nickel and copper pipes.

Work commenced on 9 July 1944, and S-50 began partial operation in September. Ferguson operated the plant through a subsidiary known as Fercleve. The plant produced 10.5 pounds (4.8 kg) of 0.852 percent uranium-235 in October. Leaks limited production and forced shutdowns over the next few months, but in June 1945 it produced 12,730 pounds (5,770 kg). By March 1945, all 21 production racks were operating.

Initially the output of S-50 was fed into Y-12. In early September Nichols appointed a production control committee, headed by Major A.V. (Pete) Peterson. Peterson's staff tried various combinations, using mechanical calculating machines, and decided that the S-50 production should be fed to K-25 rather than Y-12, which was done in April 1945. S-50 became the first stage, enriching from 0.71 percent to 0.89 percent. This material was fed into the gaseous diffusion process in the K-25 plant, which produced a product enriched to about 23 percent. This was, in turn, fed into Y-12.

Peterson's charts also showed that the proposed top stages for K-25 should be abandoned, as should Lawrence's recommendation to add more alpha stages to the Y-12 plant. Groves accepted the proposal to add more base units to the K-27 gaseous-diffusion plant and one more Beta stage track for Y-12. These additions were estimated to cost $100 million (equivalent to $1.38 billion in 2024), with completion in February 1946. Soon after Japan surrendered in August 1945, Peterson recommended that S-50 be shut down. The Manhattan District ordered this on 4 September. The last uranium hexafluoride was sent to K-25, and the plant had ceased operation by 9 September. S-50 was completely demolished in 1946.

=== Electric power ===
Despite protests from TVA that it was unnecessary, the Manhattan District built a coal-fired power plant at K-25 with eight 25,000 KW generators. Steam generated from the K-25 power plant was subsequently used by S-50. Additional power lines were laid from the TVA hydroelectric plants at Norris Dam and Watts Bar Dam, and the Clinton Engineer Works was given its own electrical substations at K-25 and K-27. By 1945, power sources were capable of supplying Oak Ridge with up to 310,000 KW, of which 200,000 KW was earmarked for Y-12, 80,000 KW for K-25, 23,000 KW for the township, 6,000 KW for S-50 and 1,000 KW for X-10. Peak demand occurred in August 1945, when all the facilities were running. The peak load was 298,800 KW on 1 September.

The 235,000 KW steam plant was required for reliability; in 1953-55 a rat shorting out a transformer at CEW resulted in a complete loss of load and of several weeks of production. The plant could supply up to five different frequencies, although it was found that variable frequency was not necessary. J.A. Jones Construction built the plant and the gaseous diffusion plant. The site was cleared in June 1943, steam was available from one boiler in March 1944 and in April 15,000 KW was available from the first turbine generator. The plant was the largest single block of steam power built at one time, and with completion in January 1945 in record time.

== Township ==
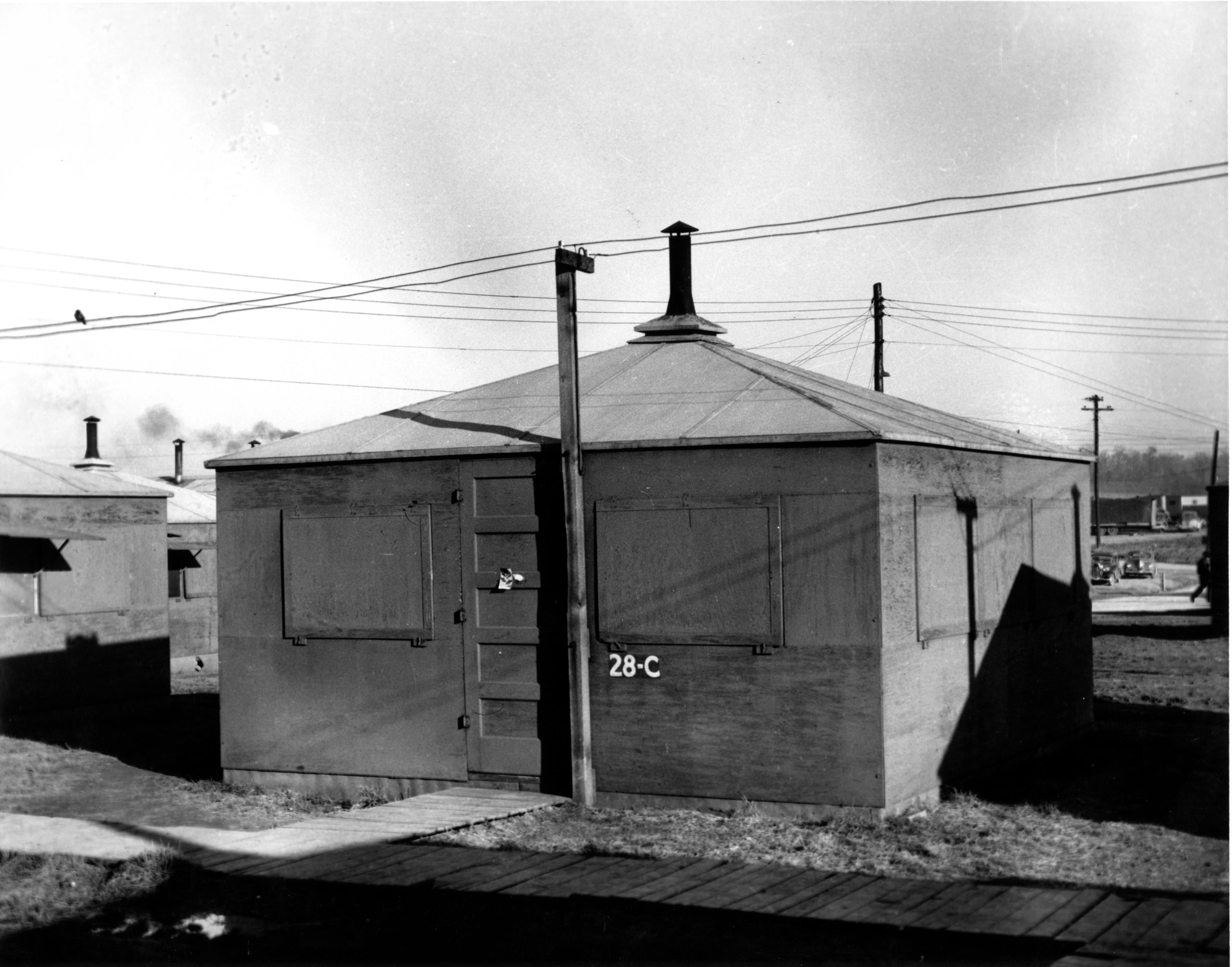
A hutment at Oak Ridge. Each of these 16-by-16-foot (4.9 by 4.9 m) temporary structures provided accommodation for five workers.

Planning for a "government village" to house the workers at the Clinton Engineer Works began in June 1942. Because the site was remote, it was believed more convenient and secure for the workers to live on the site. The gentle slopes of Black Oak Ridge, from which the new town of Oak Ridge got its name, were selected as a suitable location. Brigadier General Lucius D. Clay, the deputy chief of staff of the Army Services of Supply, reminded Marshall of a wartime limit of $7,500 per capita for individual quarters. Groves argued for "economy" with small and simple houses; but Marshall, who had argued for an exemption from the limit, saw no prospect that the kind of workers they needed would be willing to live with their family in substandard accommodation. The houses at CEW were basic but of a higher standard (as specified by Marshall and Nichols) than the houses at Los Alamos (as specified by Groves; and the quality of housing there suffered).

The first plan, submitted by Stone & Webster on 26 October 1942, was for a residential community of 13,000 people. As Stone & Webster began work on the production facilities, it became clear that building the township as well would be beyond its capacity. The Army therefore engaged the architectural and engineering firm Skidmore, Owings & Merrill to design and build the township. The John B. Pierce Foundation were brought in as a consultant. In turn, Skidmore, Owings & Merrill brought in numerous subcontractors. This first phase of construction became known as the East Town. It included some 3,000 family dwellings, an administrative center, three shopping centers, three grade schools for 500 children each and a high school for 500, recreation buildings, men's and women's dormitories, cafeterias, a medical services building and a 50-bed hospital. The emphasis was on speed of construction and getting around wartime shortages of materials. Where possible, fiberboard and gypsum board were used instead of wood, and foundations were made from concrete blocks rather than poured concrete. The work was completed in early 1944.

In addition to the East Town, a self-contained community known as the East Village, with 50 family units, its own church, dormitories and a cafeteria, was built near the Elza gate. This was intended as a segregated community for Black Americans, but by the time it was completed, it was required by white people. Black people were instead housed in "hutments" (one-room shacks) in segregated areas, some in "family hutments" created by joining two regular hutments together.

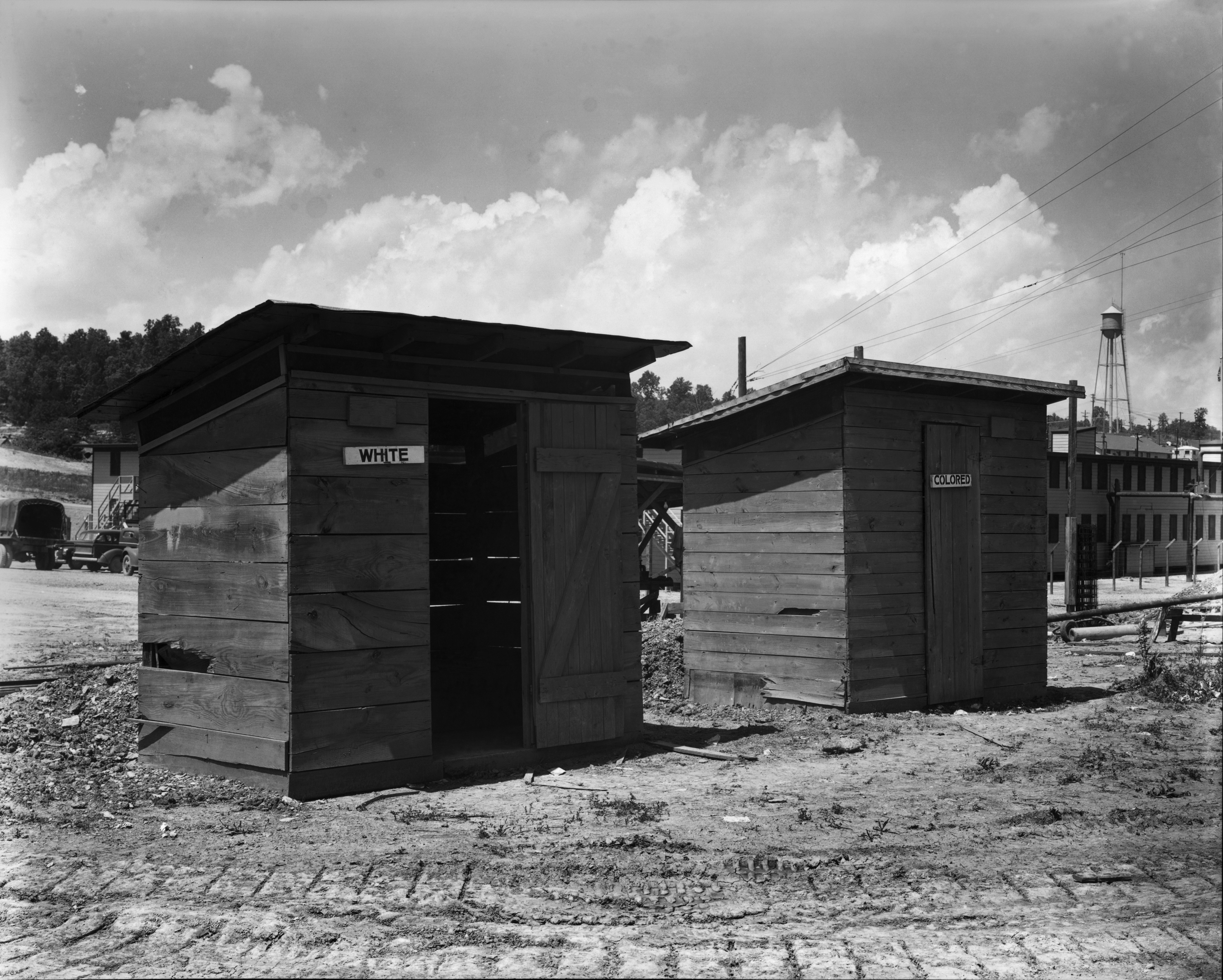
White and colored privies at the X-10 plant

The Army presence at Oak Ridge increased in August 1943 when Nichols replaced Marshall as head of the Manhattan Engineer District. One of his first tasks was to move the district headquarters to Oak Ridge, although the name of the district did not change. In September 1943 the administration of community facilities was outsourced to Turner Construction Company through a subsidiary, the Roane-Anderson Company. The company was paid a fee of $25,000 per month on a cost-plus contract, about 1 percent of the $2.8 million monthly cost of running the town facilities. Roane-Anderson did not take over everything at once, and a phased takeover started with Laundry No. 1 on 17 October 1943; transportation and garbage collection soon followed. It assumed responsibility for water and sewage in November and electricity in January 1944. The number of Roane-Anderson workers peaked at around 10,500 in February 1945, including concessionaires and subcontractors. Thereafter, numbers declined to 2,905 direct employees and 3,663 concessionaires and subcontractors when the Manhattan Project ended on 31 December 1946.

By mid-1943, it had become clear that the initial estimates of the size of the town had been too low, and a second phase of construction was required. Plans now called for a town of 42,000 people. Work began in the fall of 1943, and continued into the late summer of 1944. Only 4,793 of a planned total of 6,000 family houses were built, mostly on the East Town area and the undeveloped stretch along State Route 61. They were supplemented by 55 new dormitories, 2,089 trailers, 391 hutments, a cantonment area of 84 hutments and 42 barracks. Some 2,823 of the family units were prefabricated off-site. The high school was expanded to cater for 1,000 students. Two additional primary schools were built, and existing ones were expanded so that they could accommodate 7,000 students.

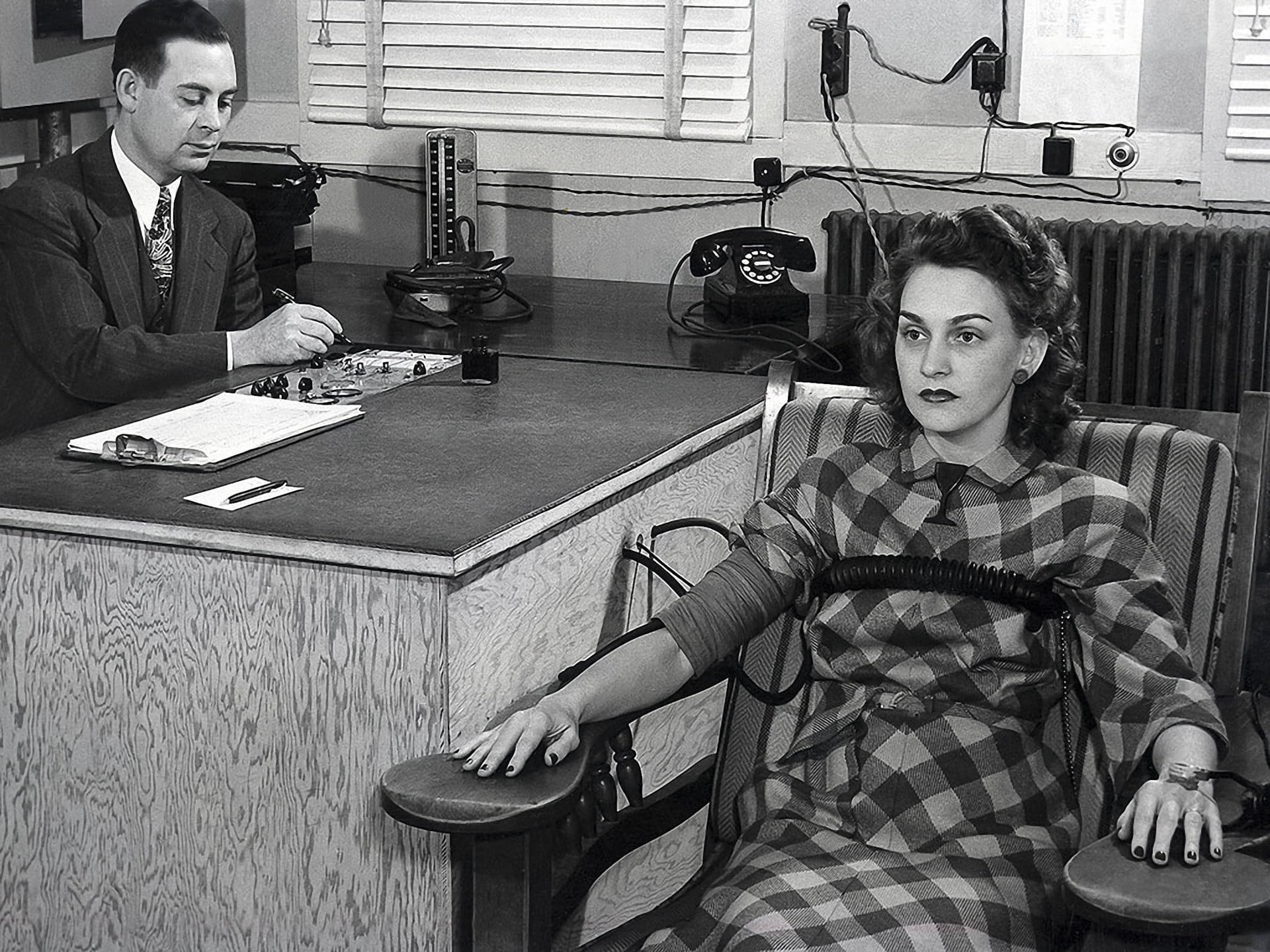
Security screening at the Clinton Engineer Works. Lie detector test.

Although expected to accommodate the needs of the entire workforce, by late 1944 expansion of both the electromagnetic and gaseous diffusion plants led to forecasts of a population of 62,000. This prompted another round of construction that saw an additional 1,300 family units and 20 dormitories built. More shopping and recreational facilities were added, the schools were expanded to accommodate 9,000 students. Police and fire services were expanded, the telephone system was upgraded, and a 50-bed annex was added to the hospital.

The number of school children reached 8,223 in 1945. Few issues resonated more with the scientists and highly skilled workers than the quality of the education system. Although school staff were nominally employees of the Anderson County Education Board, the school system was run autonomously, with federal funding under the supervision of administrators appointed by the Army. Teachers enjoyed salaries that were considerably higher than those of Anderson County. The population of Oak Ridge peaked at 75,000 in May 1945, by which time 82,000 people were employed at the Clinton Engineer Works, and 10,000 by Roane-Anderson.

In addition to the township, there were a number of temporary camps established for construction workers. It was initially intended that the construction workers should live off-site, but the poor condition of the roads and a shortage of accommodations in the area made commuting long and difficult, and in turn made it difficult to find and retain workers. Construction workers therefore came to be housed in large hutment and trailer camps. The largest, the trailer camp at Gamble Valley, had four thousand units. Another, at Happy Valley, held 15,000 people. The population of the construction camps declined as the construction effort tapered off, but they continued to be occupied in 1946.

The main shopping area was Jackson Square, with about 20 shops. The Army attempted to keep prices down by encouraging competition, but this met with limited success due to the captive nature of the population, and the requirements of security, which meant that firms and goods could not freely move in and out. The Army could give prospective concessionaires only vague information about how many people were in or would be in the town, and concessions were only for the duration of the war. Concessions were therefore charged a percentage of their profits in rental rather than a fixed fee. The Army avoided imposing draconian price controls, but limited prices to those of similar goods in Knoxville. By 1945, community amenities included 6 recreation halls, 36 bowling alleys, 23 tennis courts, 18 ball parks, 12 playgrounds, a swimming pool, a 9,400-volume library, and a newspaper.

== Personnel ==
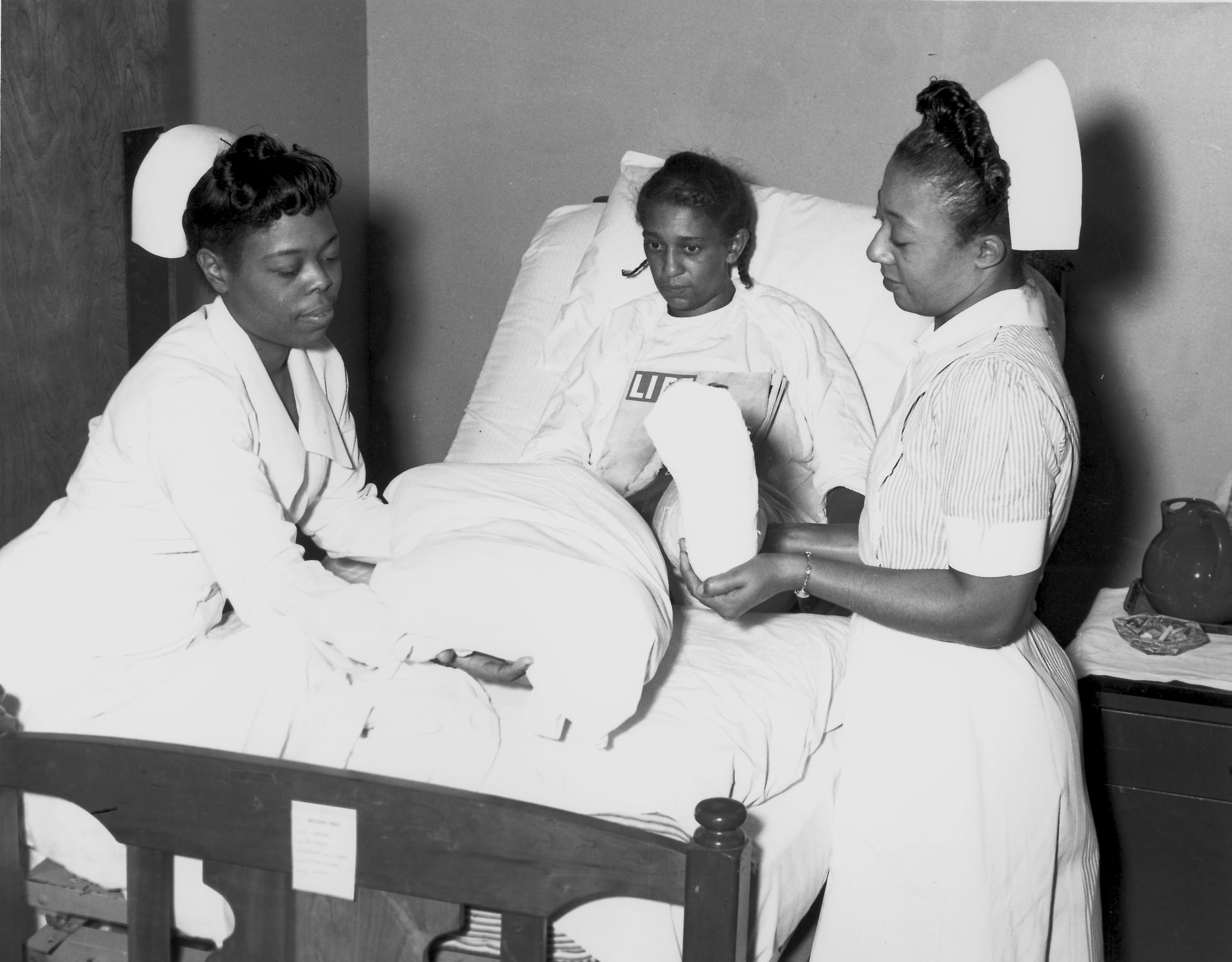
Nurses at the Oak Ridge Hospital

From 1 April 1943, access to the Clinton Engineer Works was strictly controlled, with wire fences, guarded gates, and guards patrolling the perimeter. All employees had to sign a security declaration, the purpose of which was to make them aware of possible penalties under the Espionage Act of 1917. Noting the distillation facilities and their high energy consumption, "I thought they were making sour mash to drop on the Germans, get them all drunk," engineer Benjamin Bederson recalled, before realizing that the facilities were enriching nuclear isotopes. Mail was censored, and lie detectors were employed in security checks. Everyone was issued with a color-coded badge that restricted where they could go. Despite the security, the Clinton Engineer Works was penetrated by atomic spies George Koval and David Greenglass, who passed secrets to the Soviet Union.

Occupational health and safety presented a challenge, because workers were handling a variety of toxic chemicals, using hazardous liquids and gases under high pressures, and working with high voltages, not to mention the largely unknown dangers presented by radioactivity and handling fissile materials. Accidents represented unacceptable numbers of work days lost, and a vigorous safety program was instituted. Since it did not matter where accidents occurred, this included safety off the job, in homes and in the schools. Safety indoctrination was included in job training, and safety training courses were held. Safety posters, manuals and films were distributed. In December 1945, the National Safety Council presented the Manhattan Project with the Award of Honor for Distinguished Service to Safety in recognition of its safety record.

The Clinton Engineer Works also received an award of merit in the National Traffic Safety Contest. Many workers had to drive long distances over poorly built and inadequately maintained roads. There were 21 deaths from motor vehicles at the Clinton Engineer Works: two in 1943, nine in 1944, eight in 1945 and two in 1946. This represented a better road safety record than other towns of comparable size. Ebb Cade, a black man who worked for J. A. Jones as a cement mixer, was admitted to the Oak Ridge Hospital with multiple fractures resulting from an automobile accident. He was injected with plutonium to assess its effects on the human body. Bone samples were taken from his body, and 15 of his teeth were pulled. It was determined that plutonium was a bone seeker.

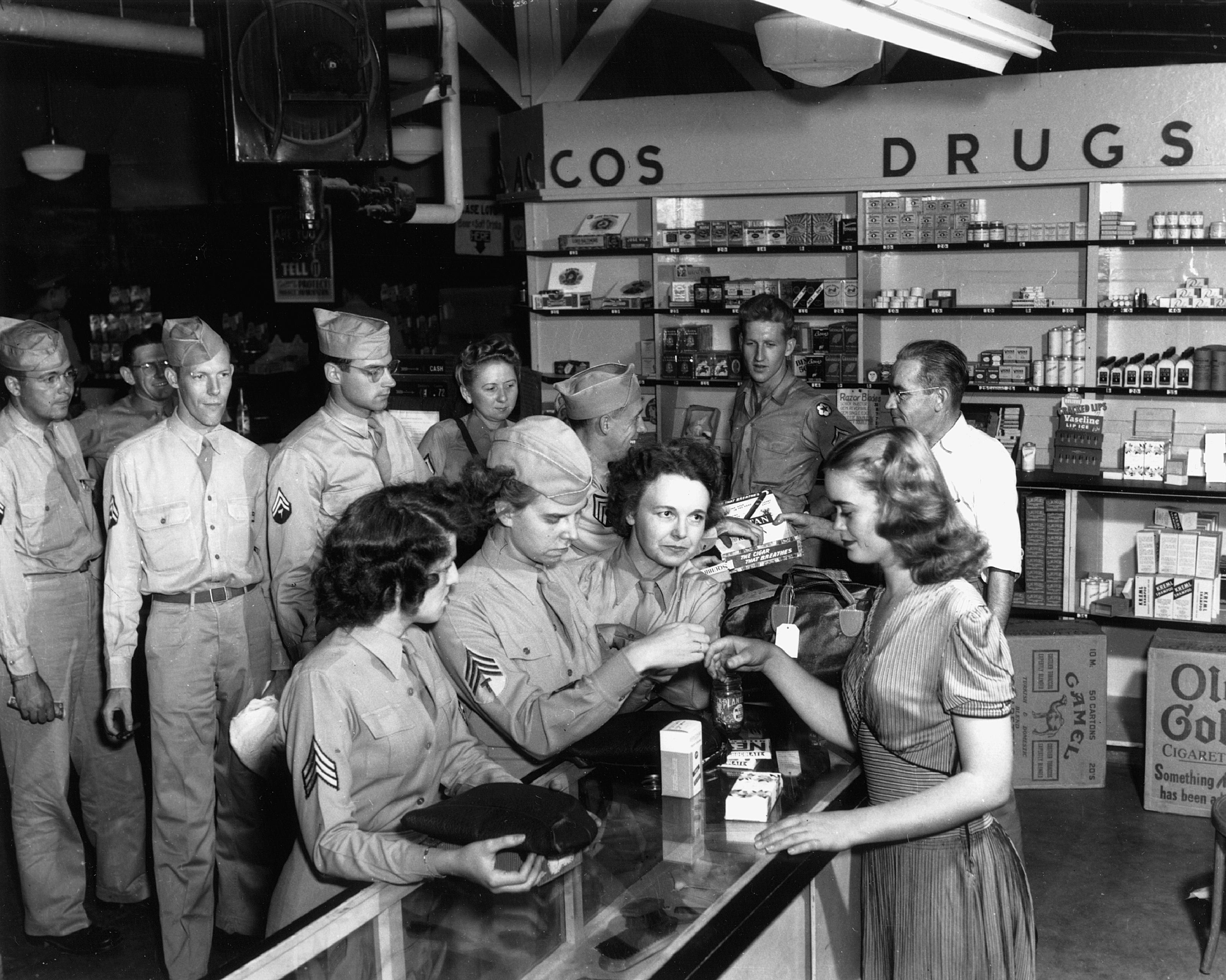
Shopping at the PX in Oak Ridge

The citizens of Oak Ridge were not allowed to have any form of local government, but the state of Tennessee—concerned over the potential loss of tax revenue—did not cede sovereignty over the land. The residents of Oak Ridge therefore did not live on a federal reservation and were entitled to vote in state and county elections. Notice of the Clinton city elections was withheld by local authorities until a week after the deadline to pay the poll tax. On the day of a 1945 referendum on whether Anderson should remain a dry county, the Edgemoor Bridge was suddenly closed for repairs, and the "dry" vote carried. A subsequent vote in 1947 reversed this result, with 4,653 "dry" votes compared to 5,888 "wet"; 5,369 of the "wet" votes came from Oak Ridge.

This was but one point of difference between Oak Ridge residents and the rest of Anderson County. While most Oak Ridge residents had high school diplomas, and many had college degrees, the average education level of adults in Anderson County was only 6.8 years. Oak Ridge residents demanded—and Groves insisted on—schools with fine teachers and first-rate facilities. To achieve this, the Manhattan District paid teachers nearly twice as much as Anderson County. The consequent drain of qualified teachers from surrounding areas aroused considerable resentment.

The Manhattan District accepted that wages and salaries had to be high enough to allow contractors to hire and retain good workers. It generally allowed wages and salaries to be paid by contractors as they saw fit, subject to limits imposed by wartime national wage and price controls intended to limit inflation. Salaries above $9,000 had to be approved by Patterson and Groves. Civilian workers paid $2.50 per month (single) or $5.00 per month (family) for medical insurance.

The War Production Board was asked to keep stores in Oak Ridge well-stocked in order to reduce absenteeism among the workers. When shortages occurred, the relatively well-paid Oak Ridge residents bought up scarce goods in surrounding areas. In both cases, they attracted the ire of their residents. Personnel employed by the Manhattan District were not exempted from being drafted under the Selective Service System. Efforts were made to employ draft-exempt personnel, and deferments were requested only for critical personnel, mainly young scientists and technicians.

== The war ends ==
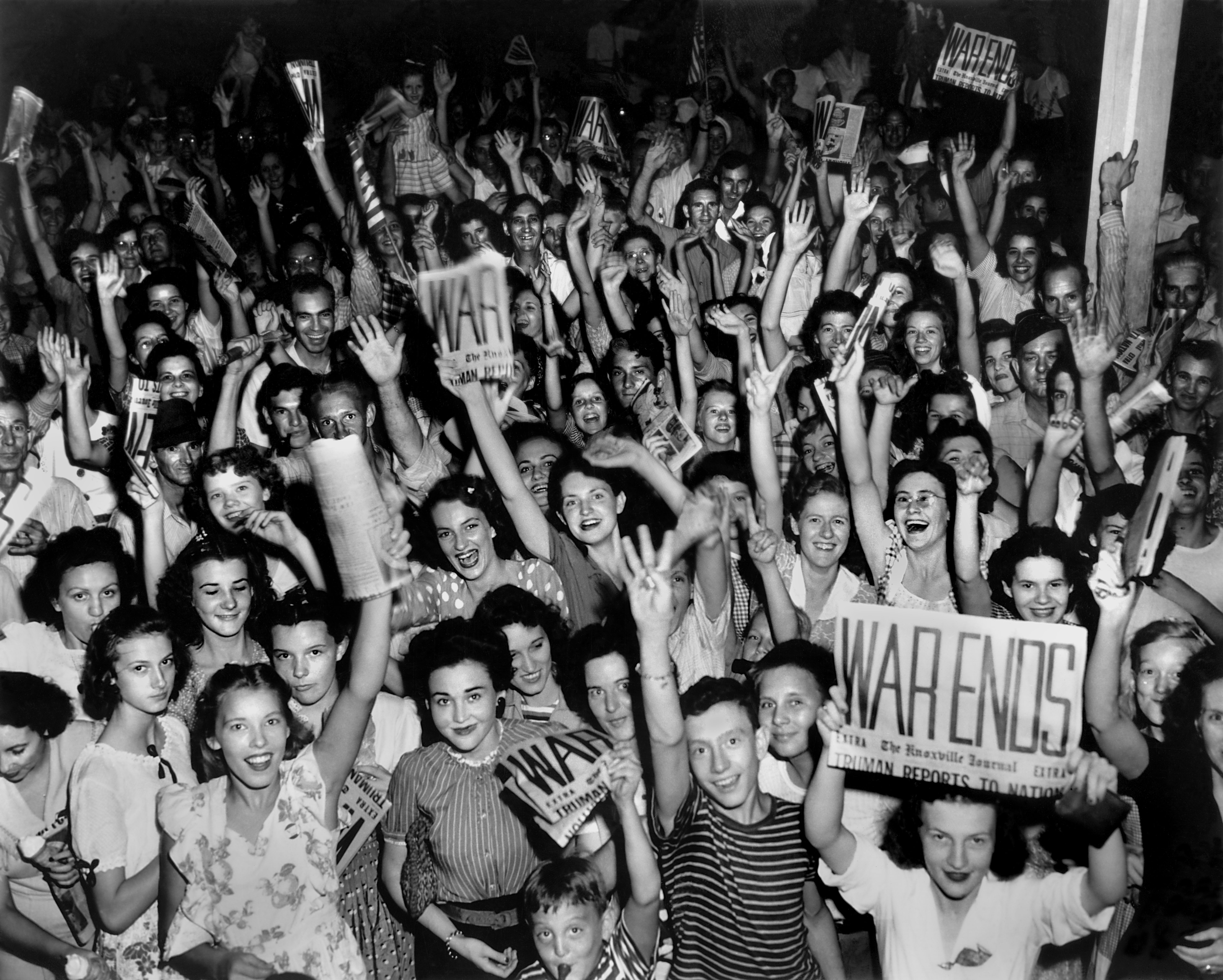
V-J Day celebrations-in Jackson Square, Oak Ridge

On 10 May 1945, Women's Army Corps typists at Manhattan District headquarters began preparing press kits on the Manhattan Project for use after an atomic bomb had been dropped. Fourteen press releases were prepared and thousands of copies made by mimeograph. The final wartime shipment of uranium-235 left the Clinton Engineer Works on 25 July. Shipments reached Tinian on C-54 aircraft on 28 and 29 July. They were incorporated into the Little Boy bomb dropped on Hiroshima on 6 August. The news was greeted with wild celebration in Oak Ridge. Patterson issued a letter to the men and women of the Clinton Engineer Works:

Today the whole world knows the secret which you have helped us keep for many months. I am pleased to be able to add that the warlords of Japan now know its effects better, even than we ourselves. The atomic bomb which you have helped to develop with high devotion to patriotic duty is the most devastating military weapon that any country has ever been able to turn against its enemy. No one of you has worked on the entire project or knows the whole story. Each of you has done his own job and kept his own secret, and so today I speak for a grateful nation when I say congratulations, and thank you all. I hope you will continue to keep the secrets you have kept so well. The need for security and for continued effort is fully as great now as it ever was. We are proud of every one of you.

== Postwar years ==
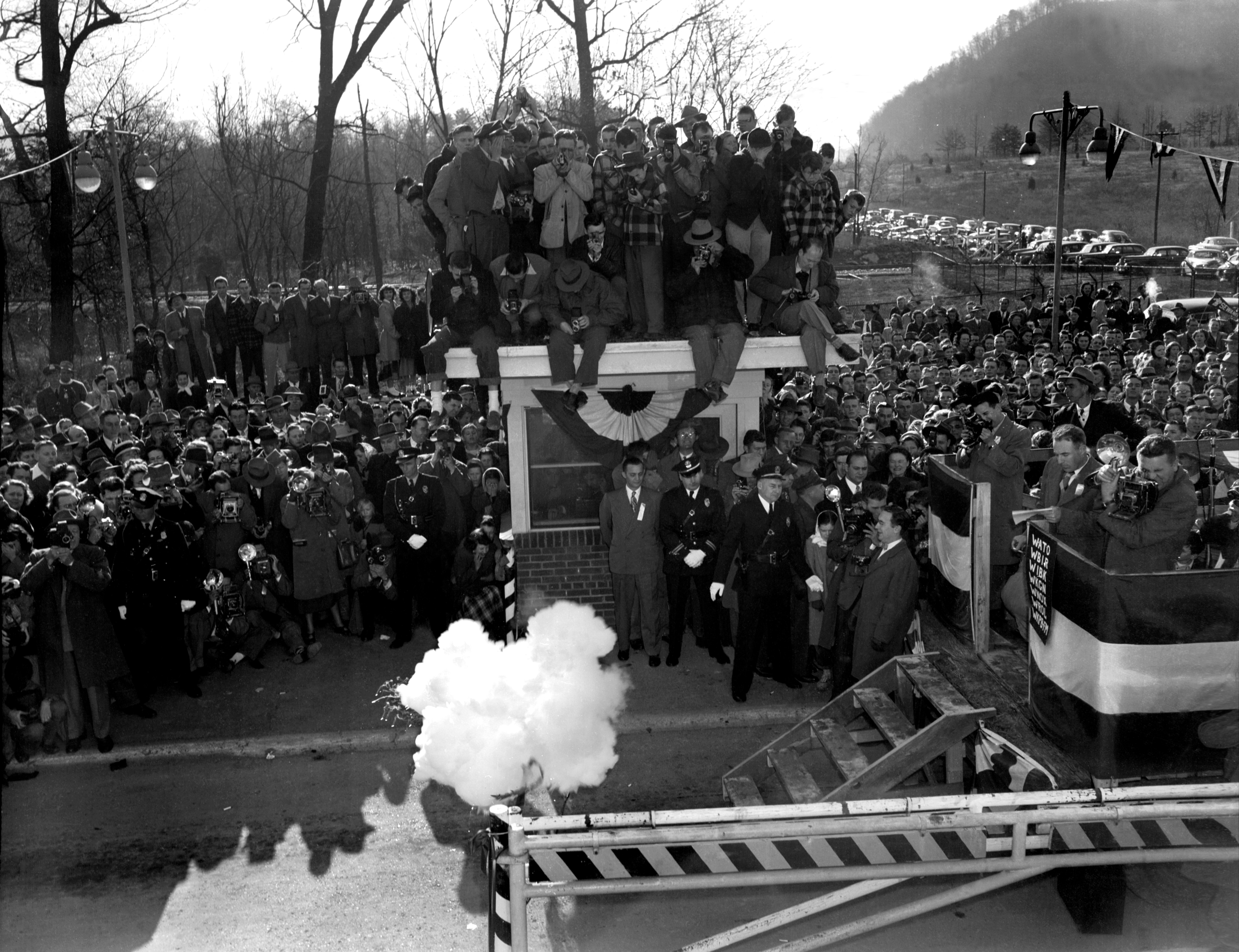
Gate opening ceremony at Elza Gate on 19 March 1949

By 1945, Roane-Anderson was divesting itself of many of its tasks. American Industrial Transit took over the transport system and Southern Bell the telephone system. Tri-State Homes began managing housing. In 1946, tenants were permitted to paint their houses in different colors from the wartime olive drab. Comprehensive medical insurance, originally instituted for security reasons, was replaced with policies from the Provident Life and Accident Insurance Company. Health care had been provided by the Army. As Army doctors were separated from the service they were replaced with civilian doctors employed by Roane-Anderson. The dental service was transferred to civilians in February 1946, and private medical practices were permitted at Oak Ridge from 1 March 1946 on.

The Oak Ridge Hospital remained an Army hospital until 1 March 1949, when it was transferred to Roane-Anderson. Monsanto took over the operation of the Clinton Laboratories on 1 July 1945. Control of the entire site passed to the Atomic Energy Commission (AEC) on 1 January 1947. The Clinton Laboratories became the Clinton National Laboratory in late 1947 and the Oak Ridge National Laboratory in January 1948. Union Carbide took over its management in December 1947, bringing all of Oak Ridge's operations under its control.

While the war was in progress, the Manhattan District resisted allowing labor unions access to its facilities. In 1946, they were permitted to operate at the Clinton Engineer Works. Elections were held at K-25, Y-12 and X-10 in August and September 1946, and the United Chemical Workers became their representative. A contract was negotiated with Union Carbide on 10 December. The Atomic Trades and Labor Council became the representative of the Clinton Laboratories, signing a contract with Monsanto on 18 December.

At its peak in May 1945, 82,000 people were employed at the Clinton Engineer Works, and 75,000 people lived in the township. By January 1946, these figures had fallen to 43,000 and 48,000 respectively. By the time the Manhattan Project concluded at the end of 1946, the corresponding figures were 34,000 and 43,000. The departure of large numbers of construction workers meant that 47 percent of those remaining were family members of workers. Eight dormitories were closed in October 1945. Most of those who remained in dorms now had their own rooms. The white hutments began to be removed. Trailers were returned to the Federal Public Housing Authority.

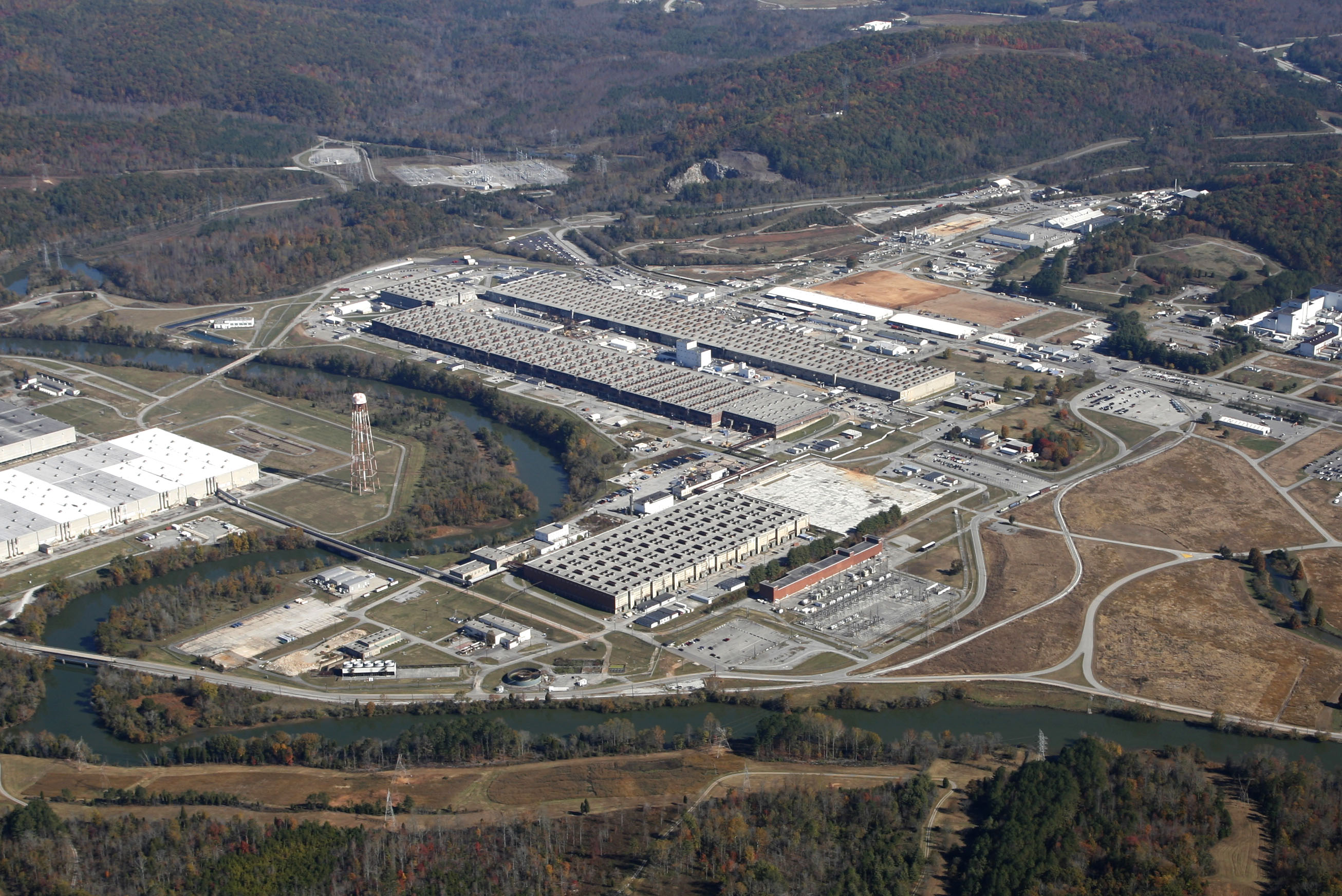
Aerial view of K-25 in 2006

The end of the war brought national attention to Oak Ridge, and there was negative publicity about the conditions that the black residents were living in. Roane-Anderson dusted off plans for a village for them. The village, called Scarboro, was built where the Gamble Valley Trailer Camp had once stood. Construction commenced in 1948, and the first residents moved in two years later. It housed the entire black community of Oak Ridge until the early 1960s.

In 1947, Oak Ridge was still part of "an island of socialism in the midst of a free enterprise economy". The AEC pressed forward with plans to withdraw from running the community, but it could not be quick enough for some members of Congress. AEC officials repeatedly explained how Roane-Anderson provided far more than regular municipal services. For the residents, the benefits of a free enterprise economy were slight. They enjoyed low rents and no property taxes, but high standards of services and an excellent school system.

Oak Ridge City Historian William J. Wilcox, Jr. notes that the townspeople "thoroughly enjoyed their much protected existence and the benevolence the Army had provided". A straw poll of the residents showed them opposed, 10 to 1, on opening the gates. Nonetheless, on 19 March 1949 the residential and commercial portion of Oak Ridge was ceremoniously opened to public access. Vice President Alben W. Barkley, Governor Gordon Browning, Atomic Energy Commission Chairman David E. Lilienthal, and movie star Marie McDonald were on hand to watch the guards take down the barriers. Access to the nuclear facilities was controlled by three Oak Ridge gatehouses. On 6 June 1951, the Senate Appropriations Committee called on the Atomic Energy Commission to discontinue "the present undemocratic method" of operating the community, and it initiated steps to coerce Oak Ridge residents to establish democratic institutions and adopt a free enterprise system.
