= Ralph G. Nevins =

American professor of mechanical engineering

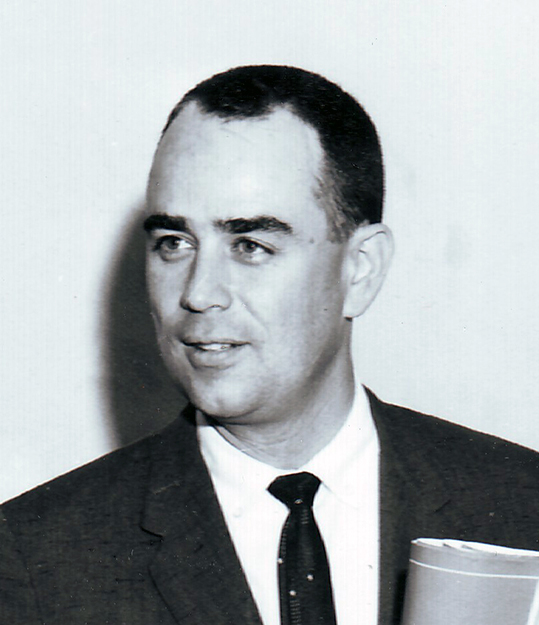

Personal details
- Born: November 15, 1924 Kinsley, Kansas, U.S.
- Died: October 30, 1974 (aged 49)
- Education: University of Minnesota; University of Illinois
- Occupation: Mechanical engineer

Ralph G. Nevins (November 15, 1924 – October 30, 1974) was an American professor of mechanical engineering and Chair of the Mechanical Engineering Department and Dean of the College of Engineering at Kansas State University, Manhattan, Kansas.

== Biography ==
Nevins was born on November 15, 1924, at Kinsley, Kansas. He grew up in Dodge City, Kansas. He earned BS and MS degrees in Mechanical Engineering from the University of Minnesota and a PhD in 1973 from the University of Illinois. He spent a year in the military and joined the faculty at Kansas State University as an instructor.

He died October 30, 1974. The Ralph G. Nevins Physiology and Human Environment Award is an annual prize given by the American Society of Heating, Refrigerating and Air Conditioning Engineers (ASHRAE) awarded since 1978 to "young researcher who has distinguished himself in man’s response to the environment, which may include thermal, acoustical, olfactory, microbial or other effects".

== Career ==
In 1957 he became chair of the Mechanical Engineering Department. He was the Kansas Power and Light Company Distinguished Professor, 1963–67. In 1961, ASHRAE decided to close its research laboratory, located in Cleveland since 1924, and invited interested organizations to bid on receiving its equipment. Nevins obtained from the state of Kansas $160,000 for a building and a like amount from the National Institutes of Health for installation and operation. He obtained the chamber and promised to carry on research in ASHRAE's interest for at least five years. The new facility was named the Institute for Environmental Research, and Nevins became its Director. Dozens of the Institute's students have received the Ralph G. Nevins Award over the years, and more than 10 graduate students and associated KSU faculty members are now ASHRAE Fellows.

In 1967 he was promoted to Dean of the College of Engineering at KSU. He published over 60 technical papers in ASHRAE, ASME, ASEE and others.

In 1973 he accepted the position of Fellow and Head of the Environmental Engineering Group and Member of the Executive Committee of the John B. Pierce Foundation Laboratory, New Haven, Connecticut, a world class environmental research organization. In association with Yale University, he was also a visiting professor of Environmental Technologies.

== Published works ==
- Nevins, Ralph G. "Psychrometrics and modern comfort". ASHRAE Transactions 67 (1961):609-621. Listed among the 100 most important papers in ASHRAE's history
- Michaels, KB, R. G. Nevins and A. M. Feyerherm. "The Effect of Floor Surface Temperature on Comfort. Part II: College Age Females." ASHRAE Trans 70 (1964): 37–43.
- Nevins, Ralph G., et al. "A Temperature-Humidity Chart for Thermal Comfort of Seated Persons." ASHRAE Transactions 72.1 (1966): 283–291.
- McNall, P. E., et al. "Thermal Comfort (Thermally Neutral) Conditions for Three Levels of Activity." ASHRAE Transactions 73.1 (1967): 3.1-3.14.
- Nevins, Ralph G. and A. M. Feyerherm. "Effect of Floor Surface Temperature on Comfort. Part IV: Cold Floors." ASHRAE Transactions 73.2 (1967).
- Rohles Jr, F. H., J. E. Woods and R. G. Nevins. "The Effect of Air Speed and Temperature on the Thermal Sensations of Sedentary Man." ASHRAE Transactions 80(1) (1974): 101–119.
- Nevins, Ralph G. "Air Diffusion Dynamics: Theory, Design, and Application". Business News Publishing Company (1976).
- Gagge, A. P., Y. Nishi and R. G. Nevins. "The Role of Clothing in Meeting FEA Energy Conservation Guidelines." ASHRAE Transactions 82.2 (1976): 234–247.
- Gagge, A. Pharo and Ralph G. Nevins. "Effect of Energy Conservation Guidelines on Comfort. Acceptability and Health." 491 (1977): 93.

== Awards ==
Nevis won the distinguished alumni and service awards from the University of Illinois in 1970 and 1971. He received the ASHRAE's Distinguished Service Award.

== See also ==
- ASHRAE
- Thermal comfort
- Physiology
- ASHRAE 55
