= Sheet Metal Workers' International Association =

North American trade union

- Abbreviation: SMWIA
- Merged into: International Association of Sheet Metal, Air, Rail and Transportation Workers
- Formation: 1888
- Dissolved: 2014
- Type: Trade union
- Headquarters: Washington, DC, US
- Locations: Canada; United States
- Members: 150,000
- Affiliations: AFL-CIO (North America's Building Trades Unions); Canadian Labour Congress
- Formerly called: Tin, Sheet Iron and Cornice Workers' International Association

The Sheet Metal Workers' International Association (SMWIA) was a trade union of skilled sheet metal workers. Such workers perform architectural sheet metal work, fabricate and install heating and air conditioning work, shipbuilding, appliance construction, heater and boiler construction, precision and specialty parts manufacture, and a variety of other jobs involving sheet metal. On August 11, 2014, the union merged with the United Transportation Union (UTU) to form the International Association of Sheet Metal, Air, Rail and Transportation Workers, known by the acronym, SMART.

The Sheet Metal Workers' International Association represented about 150,000 members in 185 local unions in the United States and Canada.

== History ==
Sheet Metal Workers Hall, San Francisco

1910

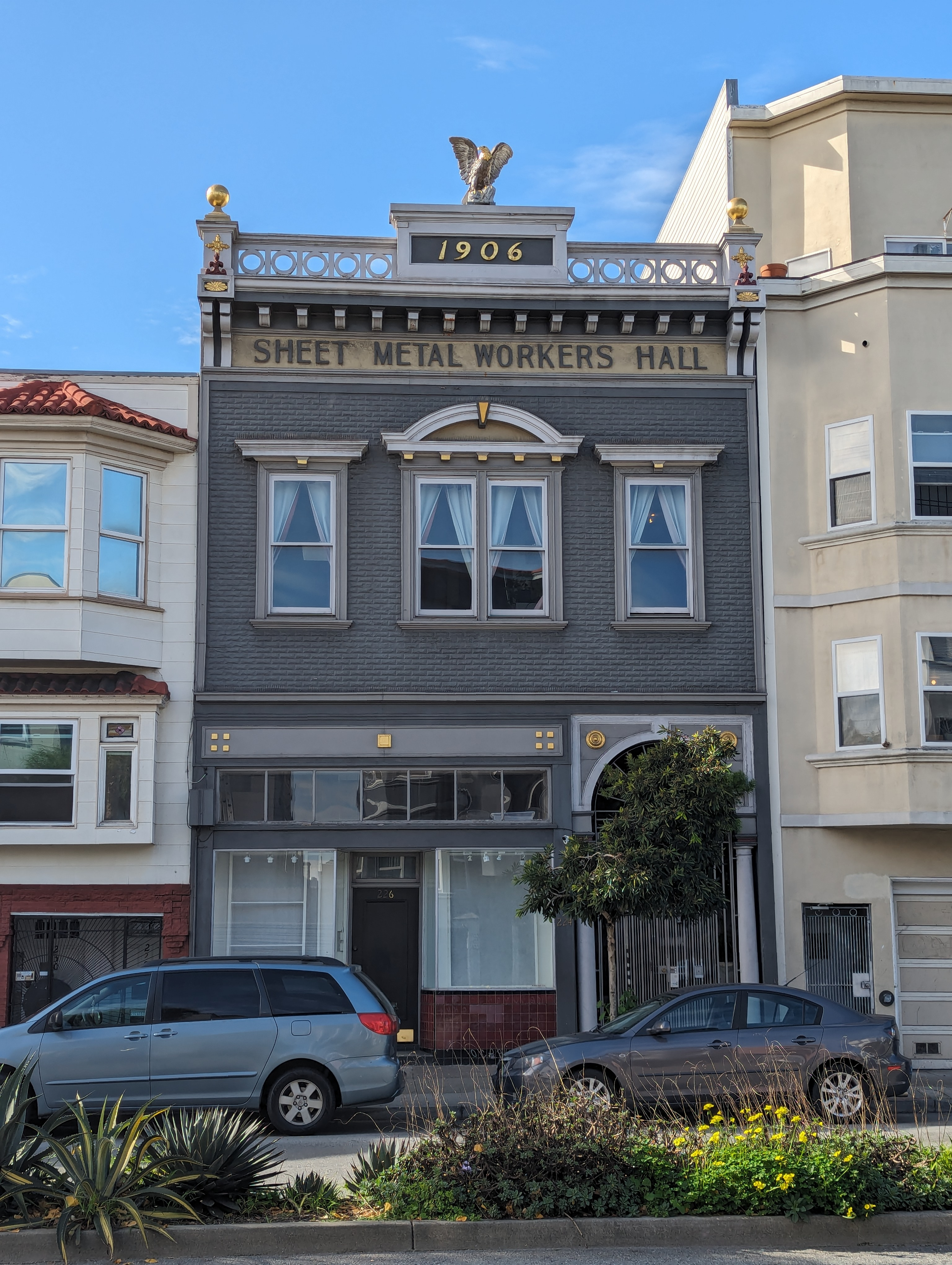
2024

In 1887, Robert Kellerstrass, secretary of the Tin and Cornice Makers Association of Peoria, Illinois—a local sheet metal workers' union—began agitating for the formation of a national sheet metal workers' union. Contacting as many tinsmiths' locals as he could, Kellerstrass arranged for a founding convention to be held in January 1888. Eleven delegates from Illinois, Missouri, Nebraska, Ohio, and Tennessee met for four days. The union was founded on January 25, 1888, in Toledo, Ohio, as the Tin, Sheet Iron and Cornice Workers' International Association.

In five years the organization grew to include 108 locals in the United States. The first local in Canada was chartered in 1896 as well, in Toronto. A second Canadian local formed in Montreal in 1900, and a Vancouver local in 1902.

The union joined the American Federation of Labor (AFL) in 1889. The Panic of 1893 weakened the union significantly, however, and the union's finances collapsed. The AFL revoked the Tin, Sheet Iron and Cornice Workers' charter in 1896, even though many locals continued to exist.

The union reorganized in 1897 as the Amalgamated Sheet Metal Workers' International Association, and was rechartered by the AFL in 1899.

In 1902, the Amalgamated Sheet Metal Workers' union instituted its first national death benefit for its members.

In 1903, the Amalgamated Sheet Metal Workers' merged with the Sheet Metal Workers' National Alliance, a secessionist group that had broken away from the union in 1902, creating the Amalgamated Sheet Metal Workers' International Alliance.

In 1907, the union merged with the Coppersmiths' International Union.

The union became embroiled in a bruising battle with the plumbers' and carpenters' unions in 1919. The Sheet Metal Workers had organized thousands of railway locomotive fabricators nationwide, but now the plumbers' union was arguing that it had jurisdiction over the piping work that went into building these engines. Railroad shop workers from the machinists, blacksmiths and plumbers met in St. Louis, Missouri in 1920 after a number of local plumbers' railroad unions defected to the Amalgamated Sheet Metal Workers. Although the workers could not agree on which union should have jurisdiction over the work, the workers did agree to form the Federated Railroad Shopmen's Union to protect their work from being taken over by non-railroad workers. In 1921, the federated union disbanded, but the Amalgamated Sheet Metal Workers won substantial jurisdictional concessions from the plumbers. The conflict would continue into the 1950s, substantially weakening the Amalgamated Sheet Metal Workers. Finally, on April 26, 1955, the National Mediation Board reaffirmed Amalgamated Sheet Metal Worker jurisdiction over plumbing and pipefitting work in the railroad industry.

The introduction of metal moldings in buildings also created a problem for the union. The United Brotherhood of Carpenters and Joiners of America claimed jurisdiction over trim and moldings, which had previously been made of wood. The carpenters' union had won a jurisdictional award from an arbitrator in New York City in the spring of 1909. But the Amalgamated Sheet Metal Workers demanded that the Building Trades Department (BTD) of the AFL issue a ruling. By a 3-to-1 majority, delegates to the Building Trades convention voted in favor of the Amalgamated Sheet Metal Workers. The carpenters, then the second-largest union in the AFL, withdrew from the Building Trades and initiated a series of jurisdictional strikes against the Amalgamated Sheet Metal Workers at job sites nationwide. The BTD retaliated by asking AFL president Samuel Gompers to revoke the carpenter's union charter. Instead, Gompers led the AFL executive council in demanding that the BTD reinstate the carpenters' union. The Building Trades did so in 1910, but continued to vote in favor of the Amalgamated Sheet Metal Workers' claims on work. The carpenters' union disaffiliated again. The carpenters' union continued to conduct strikes against the Amalgamated Sheet Metal Workers, and increasingly won the support of building contractors and local building trades councils. The National Board of Jurisdictional Awards also voted in favor of the Amalgamated Sheet Metal Workers. But the pressure by the much larger carpenters' union proved too great, and the Amalgamated Sheet Metal Workers conceded jurisdiction over interior work in 1926.

The Amalgamated Sheet Metal Workers' railroad affiliates were deeply involved in the Great Railroad Strike of 1922, which proved to be a disaster for the union's railway unions.

The Amalgamated Sheet Metal Workers' absorbed the chandelier, brass, and metal workers in 1924, and once more changed its name—this time to the Sheet Metal Workers' International Association.

In 1926, the Sheet Metal Workers co-founded the Railway Labor Executives' Association, a union lobbying group.

In the spring of 1927, members of Local 206 in San Diego, California, build structural reinforcements for Charles Lindbergh's aircraft, "The Spirit of St. Louis".

During World War II, Sheet Metal Workers members assisted in the building of buildings, experimental machinery, and atomic weapons-making equipment at Oak Ridge, Tennessee, as part of the Manhattan Project. In 1946, the Sheet Metal Workers became one of the founding members of the Atomic Trades and Labor Council.

The Sheet Metal Workers are notable for negotiating a number of "firsts" in the construction industry. In 1946, Local 28 in New York City negotiated the first local health and welfare plan in the construction industry. In 1950, Local 28 negotiated the first pension plan in the construction industry. In 1966, the union established its first national pension plans (one for construction workers, one for manufacturing workers).

In 1960, the Sheet Metal Workers organized its first political action committee, the Political Action League (PAL).

== Leadership ==
The Sheet Metal Workers have a long history of stable leadership. Robert Byron headed the union from 1939 to 1959. For three decades afterward, the union was headed by a father-son team. Edward F. Carlough was elected president in 1959, and his son Edward J. Carlough succeeded him in 1971.

In 1993, Edward J. Carlough resigned as president of the Sheet Metal Workers after union members strongly criticized his lavish lifestyle and excessive spending. Carlough had a year left in his term.

In 1993, Arthur Moore, a vice president of the union, was elected to succeed the younger Carlough as president. Moore won election as president outright in August 1994, and was active in the coalition which unseated AFL–CIO president Lane Kirkland in 1995 and elected John Sweeney.

Moore retired after one term, and Michael J. Sullivan was elected president of the union.

Sullivan retired in 2011. Joseph J. Nigro was elected General President effective July 1, 2011. He had been General Secretary Treasurer since 2006 and Assistant to the General President prior to that since September 1999.

The merger between the SMWIA and the United Transportation Union (UTU) was finalized at the SMART First General Convention held in Las Vegas, Nevada the week of August 11–15, 2014. SMART stands for the International Association of Sheet Metal, Air, Rail and Transportation Workers.

== Contributions to political campaigns ==
According to OpenSecrets, Sheet Metal Workers Union was the United States' 27th largest donor to federal political campaigns and committees, having contributed over $51.8 million since 1989, over 90% of which went to the Democratic Party and other liberal groups. In the 2018 election cycle, SMART's political action committee ranked sixth in donations to federal candidates at nearly $2.8 million.

== Presidents ==
- Archibald Barnes, 1888–1889
- E.F. McKeon, 1890–1891
- Hugh Schwab, 1892
- F.A. Pouchot, 1893–1894
- T.J. Ritter, 1895
- R.M. Ryan, 1896
- H.H. Brauch, 1897–1898
- F.C. Cole, 1899–1902
- Richard Pattison, 1903–1904
- Michael O'Sullivan, 1905–1912
- J. J. Hynes, 1913–1938
- Robert Byron, 1939-June 1959
- Edward F. Carlough, June 1959- September 1970
- Edward J. Carlough, October 1970-July 1993
- Arthur Moore, July 1993 – 1999
- Michael Sullivan, 1999–2011
- Joseph J. Nigro, 2011
