= Arthur Moore (labor leader) =

Arthur R. Moore
- Born: May 14, 1933; U.S.
- Died: May 24, 2013 (aged 80); Lake Success, New York, U.S.
- Occupation: Labor union president

Arthur "Artie" Moore (May 14, 1933 — May 24, 2013) was president of the Sheet Metal Workers International Association (SMWIA) from July 1993 to 1999.

In July 1993, SMWIA president Edward J. Carlough resigned after union members strongly criticized his lavish lifestyle and excessive spending. Carlough had a year left in his term. Moore, a vice president of the union, was elected to succeed Carlough. Moore won election as president outright in August 1994, and was active in the coalition which unseated AFL-CIO president Lane Kirkland in 1995 and elected John Sweeney.

Moore was elected a vice president of the AFL-CIO in 1995. He also was a vice president of the Building and Construction Trades Department, AFL–CIO and a member of the executive board of the Metal Trades Department, AFL–CIO and the Maritime Trades Department, AFL–CIO.

Moore retired after one term, and Michael J. Sullivan was elected president of the union.

Moore was a director of the ACMAT Corporation, a building contractor located in Connecticut.

Arthur Moore died of undisclosed causes at the age of 80 while living in Lake Success, New York. He was survived by his wife, Madeleine, and his children Arthur, Kenneth, Christopher, Jeanine, and Corinne. He was interred at St. Charles Cemetery in Farmingdale, New York.

Trade union offices
Preceded by Edward J. Carlough	President, Sheet Metal Workers International Association; 1993 - 1999	Succeeded by Michael Sullivan
