= Embden Town House =

- U.S. National Register of Historic Places
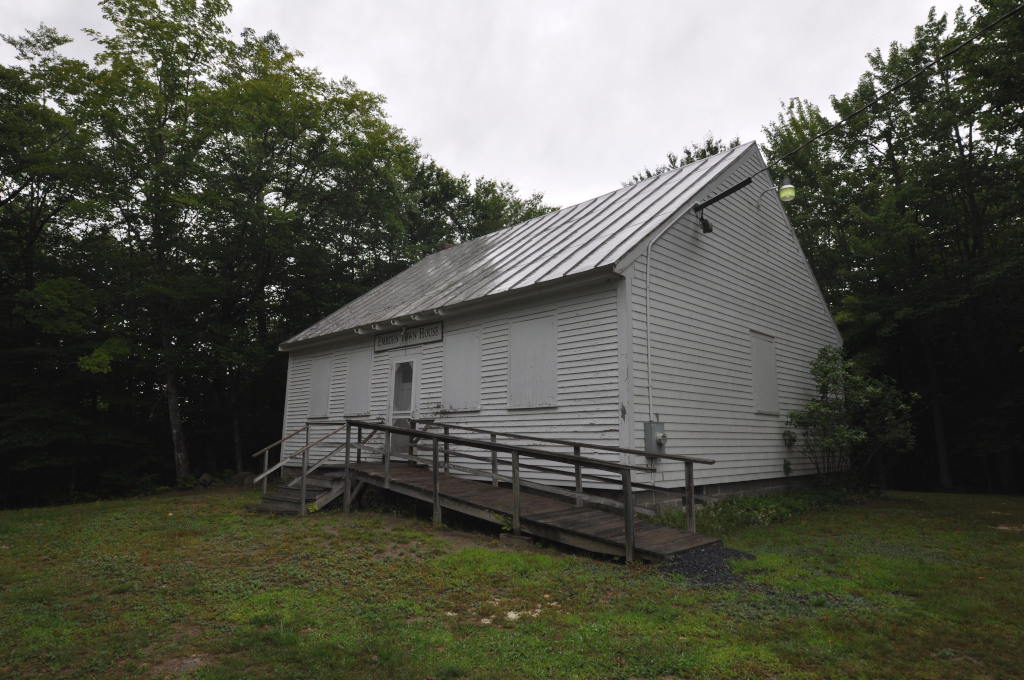

- Location within Maine Location within the United States
- Location: Cross Town Rd., Embden, Maine
- Coordinates: 44°54′42″N 69°55′57″W
- Area: less than one acre
- Built: 1848
- Built by: Elisha Walker
- Architectural style: Federal
- NRHP reference No.: 89001704
- Added to NRHP: October 16, 1989

The Embden Town House is a historic civic building at Cross Town Road, near Perkins Road, in Embden, Maine. Built in 1848, it continues to be used for town meetings and other civic functions, although town offices are now located in a more modern facility at 809 Embden Pond Road. The building was listed on the National Register of Historic Places in 1989.

== Description and history ==
The Embden Town House is set in a clearing on the north side of Cross Town Road, just east of its junction with Perkins Road, in Embden, Maine. It is a single-story wood frame structure, with a side gable roof and wooden clapboard and shingle siding. Its main facade, facing southeast, is five bays wide, with a center entry and four twelve-over-eight sash windows with operable shutters. The side gabled elevations have single windows at the center; the western one also has a brick flue. The rear wall is asymmetrical, with a small privy built onto the northwestern corner, and three bays of windows, the center one placed higher than the others. Decorative styling is limited to a simple box cornice.

The interior has seen relatively little alteration despite its many years of civic use. The walls are finished with plaster above wainscoting, some of which appears to hold very old paint. Benches are arrayed around the southern, western and eastern walls, and the center of the northern wall has a podium and seating area for the town selectmen. Voting booths are attached to the northwest portion of the rear wall. These, along with the tongue-and-groove wooden ceiling, are 20th-century modifications.

Embden was settled in 1779 and incorporated in 1804. For many years town meetings were held in private residences and school buildings, and in 1832 discussion began about construction of a town meeting space. This debate did not reach fruition until 1847, when the town authorized funding for construction. The present building was constructed by Elisha Walker in 1848; he was paid $250.15. The building continues to be used for town functions, although it is no longer a polling place. The building was moved a short distance onto a new foundation in 1991.

== See also ==
- National Register of Historic Places listings in Somerset County, Maine
