= Edward J. Carlough =

American labor leader

- Born: April 10, 1932; New York City, New York State, U.S.
- Died: June 29, 1994 (aged 62)
- Education: American University School of Public Affairs
- Occupation: Labor union leader
- Known for: President of Sheet Metal Workers International Association from 1970 to 1993

Edward J. Carlough (April 10, 1932 – June 29, 1994) was an American labor leader and president of the Sheet Metal Workers International Association from 1970 to 1993.

Carlough was born in 1932 to Edward F. Carlough in New York City. He was educated in public schools in New York. He completed his schooling in Washington, D.C. after his father was elected to national office in the Sheet Metal Workers.

Carlough apprenticed as a sheet metal worker with Local Union 28 in New York City in 1949. He graduated from American University with a bachelor's degree in political science in 1954.

In 1956, Carlough was appointed a field representative with Labor's League for Political Education, an early political action committee of the AFL-CIO. He continued with the department after it became known as the Committee on Political Education.

In 1957, Carlough was appointed director of research for the Sheet Metal Workers International Association. His father was elected international union president in 1959, and Carlough was appointed the union's organizing director in 1960.

Carlough was elected president of the Sheet Metal Workers in 1970 after his father retired. He was a strong critic of President Richard Nixon, and fought vigorously against wage-and-price controls. During his tenure as president, he improved pension, health and training programs. he also built up the union's international program, particularly in Poland.

In 1993, Edward J. Carlough resigned as president of the Sheet Metal Workers after union members strongly criticized his lavish lifestyle and excessive spending. Carlough had a year left in his term. Arthur Moore succeeded him as union president.

Carlough retired to Rockville, Maryland. He died of cancer during a trip to New Bern, North Carolina.

Carlough had a wife, June, three daughters and one son.

Preceded by Edward F. Carlough	President, Sheet Metal Workers International Association; 1970 - 1993	Succeeded by Arthur Moore
