= Embden, Maine =

Town in Maine, United States

- Town
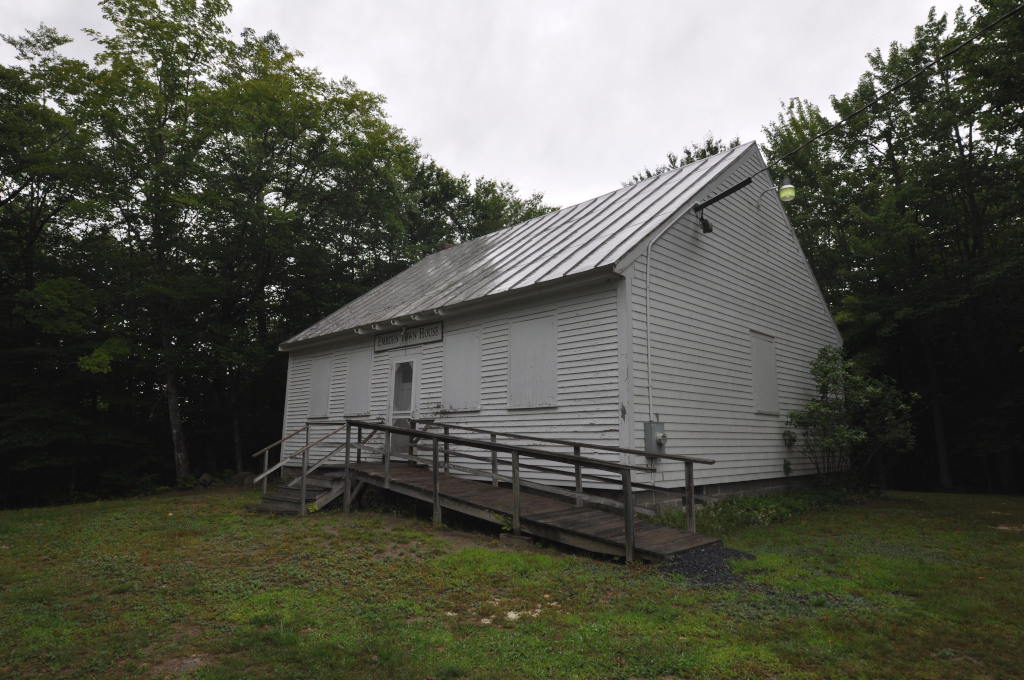
- Embden Town House, built in 1848

- Location within Maine Location within the United States
- Coordinates: 44°55′30″N 69°55′58″W
- Country: United States
- State: Maine
- County: Somerset

Area
  - Total: 43.49 sq mi (112.64 km^{2})
  - Land: 39.58 sq mi (102.51 km^{2})
  - Water: 3.91 sq mi (10.13 km^{2})
- Elevation: 456 ft (139 m)

Population (2020)
  - Total: 902
  - Density: 23/sq mi (8.8/km^{2})
- Time zone: UTC-5 (Eastern (EST))
  - Summer (DST): UTC-4 (EDT)
- ZIP code: 04958
- Area code: 207
- FIPS code: 23-23410
- GNIS feature ID: 582466
- Website: embden.maine.gov

Embden is a town in Somerset County, Maine, United States. The population was 902 at the 2020 census.

== Geography ==
According to the United States Census Bureau, the town has a total area of 43.49 square miles (112.64 km^{2}), of which 39.58 square miles (102.51 km^{2}) is land and 3.91 square miles (10.13 km^{2}) is water. Included in the town is Embden Pond.

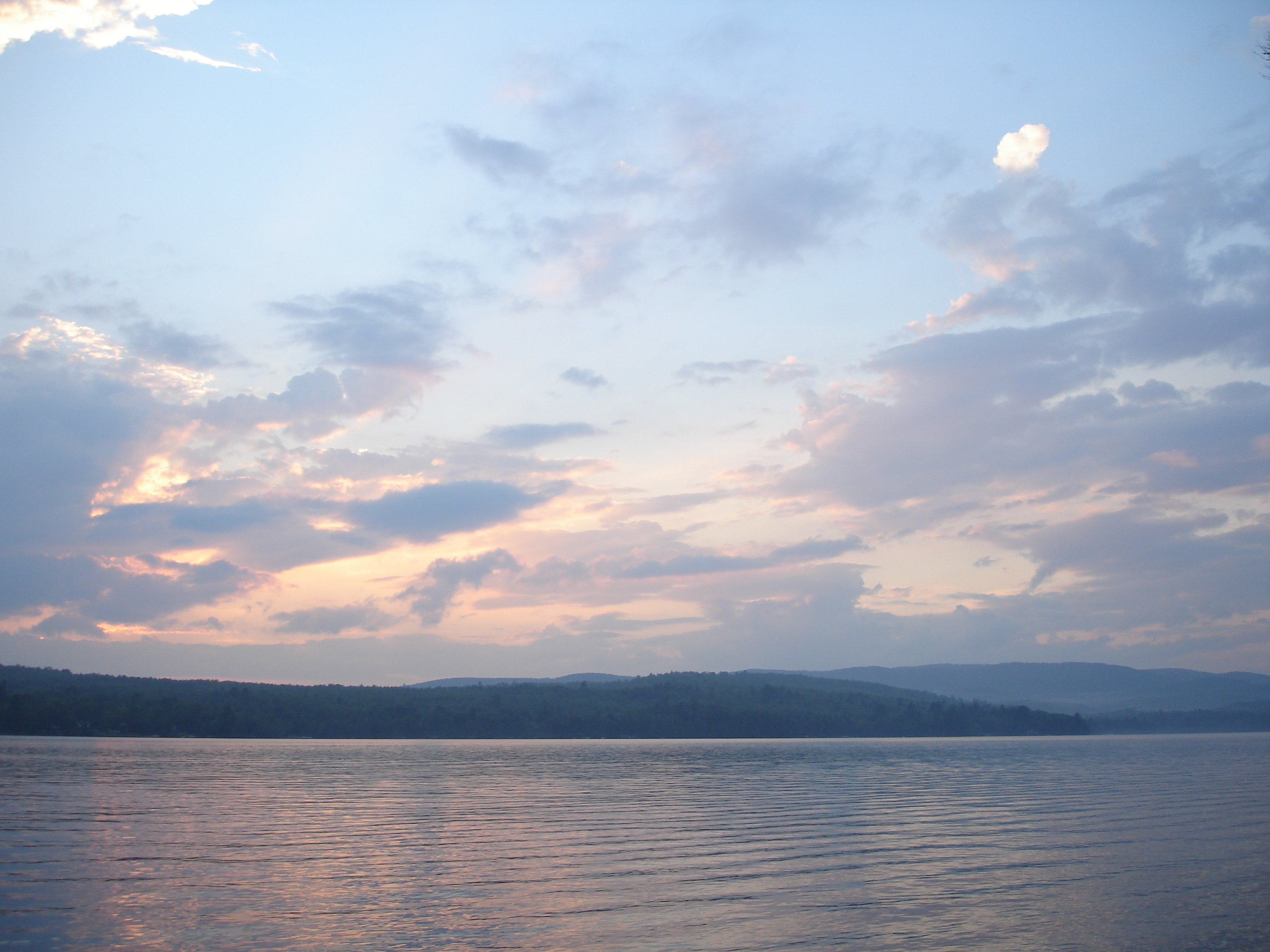
Embden Pond

== Demographics ==
Historical population
Census	Pop.	Note	%±
1810	351		—
1820	664		89.2%
1830	894		34.6%
1840	983		10.0%
1850	971		−1.2%
1860	1,041		7.2%
1870	803		−22.9%
1880	674		−16.1%
1890	579		−14.1%
1900	567		−2.1%
1910	529		−6.7%
1920	475		−10.2%
1930	393		−17.3%
1940	319		−18.8%
1950	303		−5.0%
1960	321		5.9%
1970	418		30.2%
1980	536		28.2%
1990	659		22.9%
2000	881		33.7%
2010	939		6.6%
2020	902		−3.9%
U.S. Decennial Census

=== 2010 census ===
As of the census of 2010, there were 939 people, 407 households, and 286 families living in the town. The population density was 23.7 inhabitants per square mile (9.2/km^{2}). There were 950 housing units at an average density of 24.0 per square mile (9.3/km^{2}). The racial makeup of the town was 97.6% White, 0.4% African American, 0.4% Native American, 0.2% Asian, 0.6% from other races, and 0.7% from two or more races. Hispanic or Latino of any race were 1.2% of the population.

There were 407 households, of which 23.6% had children under the age of 18 living with them, 60.9% were married couples living together, 5.2% had a female householder with no husband present, 4.2% had a male householder with no wife present, and 29.7% were non-families. 24.8% of all households were made up of individuals, and 11.3% had someone living alone who was 65 years of age or older. The average household size was 2.28 and the average family size was 2.66.

The median age in the town was 49.7 years. 17.9% of residents were under the age of 18; 5% were between the ages of 18 and 24; 20.1% were from 25 to 44; 36.6% were from 45 to 64; and 20.4% were 65 years of age or older. The gender makeup of the town was 52.3% male and 47.7% female.

=== 2000 census ===
As of the census of 2000, there were 881 people, 365 households, and 262 families living in the town. The population density was 22.0 people per square mile (8.5 people/km^{2}). There were 893 housing units at an average density of 22.3 per square mile (8.6/km^{2}). The racial makeup of the town was 98.86% White, 0.23% Native American, and 0.91% from two or more races. Hispanic or Latino of any race were 0.11% of the population.

There were 364 households, out of which 28.2% had children under the age of 18 living with them, 61.6% were married couples living together, 6.3% had a female householder with no husband present, and 28.2% were non-families. 22.2% of all households were made up of individuals, and 9.3% had someone living alone who was 65 years of age or older. The average household size was 2.38 and the average family size was 2.74.

In the town, the population was spread out, with 21.7% under the age of 18, 5.9% from 18 to 24, 28.7% from 25 to 44, 28.4% from 45 to 64, and 15.3% who were 65 years of age or older. The median age was 42 years. For every 100 females, there were 103.5 males. For every 100 females age 18 and over, there were 101.8 males.

The median income for a household in the town was $31,397, and the median income for a family was $35,833. Males had a median income of $28,281 versus $20,781 for females. The per capita income for the town was $14,588. About 10.2% of families and 15.4% of the population were below the poverty line, including 15.7% of those under age 18 and 13.8% of those age 65 or over.

== Notable people ==
- John B. Pierce, founder of the company that became American Standard
