= Atomic Trades and Labor Council =

Labor organization

ATLC
- Atomic Trades and Labor Council
- Founded: September 25, 1946
- Location: United States
- Members: 2,100
- Affiliations: Metal Trades Department, AFL–CIO

The Atomic Trades and Labor Council (ATLC) is a labor union umbrella organization, affiliated with the Metal Trades Department of the AFL–CIO, that serves as the bargaining unit representing about 2,100 workers employed by U.S. Department of Energy contractors at Oak Ridge National Laboratory and the Y-12 National Security Complex in Oak Ridge, Tennessee.

The ATLC was established in 1946 and was certified by the National Labor Relations Board on September 25, 1946, as the bargaining unit for Oak Ridge National Laboratory employees located at the X-10 site. It was certified to represent Y-12 employees in 1951.

The ATLC's members belong to 16 international unions and 17 local unions, including:

- International Association of Heat and Frost Insulators and Asbestos Workers Local 52
- Service Employees International Union Local 166
- International Brotherhood of Boilermakers, Iron Ship Builders, Blacksmiths, Forgers and Helpers Local 453
- United Brotherhood of Carpenters and Joiners Local 50
- International Chemical Workers Union Council of the United Food and Commercial Workers Local 715c / Local 252c
- UNITE HERE Local 623
- International Brotherhood of Electrical Workers Local 760
- International Association of Fire Fighters Local I-2
- International Association of Machinists and Aerospace Workers Local 480
- International Union of Operating Engineers Local 900
- International Brotherhood of Painters and Allied Trades of the United States and Canada Local 1805
- United Association of Journeymen and Apprentices of the Plumbing and Pipe Fitting Industry of the United States and Canada Local 718
- International Association of Bridge, Structural, Ornamental and Reinforcing Iron Workers Local 384
- Sheet Metal Workers International Association Local 5
- International Brotherhood of Teamsters Local 519
- Operative Plasterers' and Cement Masons' International Association of the United States and Canada Local 78

ATLC currently has a four-year contract, from April 2009 through April 2013, with UT-Battelle that covers work at Oak Ridge National Laboratory. Its current contract with B&W Y-12, covering workers at Y-12, extends through June 22, 2013.

== See also ==
Labor unions in the United States
