= John B. Pierce =

John Bartlett Pierce
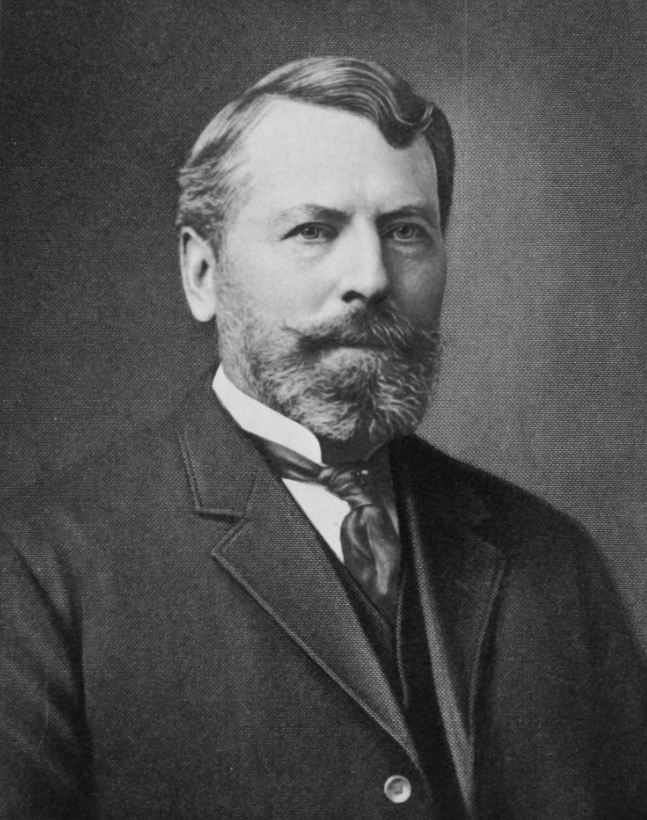
- Born: June 2, 1844; Embden, Maine
- Died: June 23, 1917 (aged 73); Lynnfield, Massachusetts
- Occupation: Industrialist

Signature
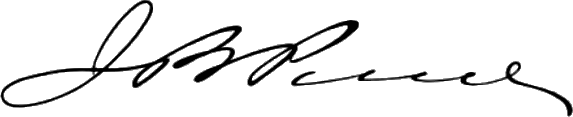

John Bartlett Pierce (June 2, 1844 – June 23, 1917) was an American industrialist who founded the Pierce Steam Heating Company, a forerunner of the American Radiator Company.

== Biography ==
Pierce was born June 2, 1844, in Embden, Maine. His first business enterprise was a store in Buffalo, New York, acquired 1872. He subsequently took on an assistant Joseph Bond, who was experienced in the installation of furnaces and stoves. In 1881 Pierce and Bond founded the Pierce Steam Heating Company of Buffalo.

In 1892 he merged his company with the Detroit Radiator Company and the Michigan Radiator and Iron Company to form the American Radiator Company.

Pierce was married twice, but died childless in Lynnfield, Massachusetts on June 23, 1917. His will left company stock, valued at more than $1 million, to more than 400 friends and employees, and designated additional funds to endow a private foundation.

=== Legacy ===
The John B. Pierce Foundation was established in 1924 to promote research, educational, technical or scientific work in the general field of heating, ventilation and sanitation.
