= Cooling load temperature difference calculation method =

The cooling load temperature difference (CLTD) calculation method, also called the cooling load factor (CLF) or solar cooling load factor (SCL) method, is a method of estimating the cooling load or heating load of a building. It was introduced in the 1979 ASHRAE handbook.

== CLTD/CLF/SCL cooling load calculation method ==
The CLTD/CLF/SCL (cooling load temperature difference/cooling load factor/solar cooling load factor) cooling load calculation method was first introduced in the 1979 ASHRAE Cooling and Heating Load Manual (GRP-158) The CLTD/CLF/SCL Method is regarded as a reasonably accurate approximation of the total heat gains through a building envelope for the purposes of sizing HVAC equipment. This method was developed as a simpler calculation alternative to difficult and unwieldy calculation methods such as the transfer function method and the Sol-air temperature method. Error when using the CLTD/CLF/SCL method tends to be less than twenty percent over and less than ten percent under.

== History ==
After its introduction in the 1979 ASHRAE handbook, research continued on increasing the accuracy of the CLTD/CLF method. Research completed in 1984 revealed some factors which were not accounted for in the original publication of the method; these findings were a result of the ASHRAE research project 359. In 1988 ASHRAE Research Project 472 worked to correct these oversights with the introduction of a classification system for walls, roofs, and zones. Additionally, a weighting factor database was generated to help correct for previous inaccuracies. Additional research in Thermal radiation and appliance heat gain with respect to CLTD data was also completed shortly after the original publication of the method. The advancements in each of these areas inspired a revision/compilation effort, and in 1993 the CLTD/CLF/SCL method was succinctly compiled by Spitler, McQuiston, and Lindsey.

== Application ==
The CLTD/CLF/SCL method uses predetermined set of data to expedite and simplify the process of cooling/heating load approximation. The data is divided into many different sections based on many different variables. These variables include, building material of the envelope, thicknesses of the building materials, day of the year, time of day, orientation of the surface (e.g. wall or roof, 90 degrees or 180), and wall face orientation (cardinal directions, i.e. N, NW, S, SE, etc.), to name a few. In order to determine which set of CLTD/CLF/SCL data to look at, all the requisite variables must be defined.

The respective tables of data were generally developed by using the more complex transfer function method to determine the various cooling loads for different types of heating. The results gained by doing so are then normalized for each type of heat gain used for the tables, CLTD, CLF, and SCL.

== Explanation of variables ==
The first of the cooling load factors used in this method is the CLTD, or the Cooling Load Temperature Difference. This factor is used to represent the temperature difference between indoor and outdoor air with the inclusion of the heating effects of solar radiation.

The second factor is the CLF, or the cooling load factor. This coefficient accounts for the time lag between the outdoor and indoor temperature peaks. Depending on the properties of the building envelope, a delay is present when observing the amount of heat being transferred inside from the outdoors. The CLF is the cooling load at a given time compared to the heat gain from earlier in the day.

The SC, or shading coefficient, is used widely in the evaluation of heat gain through glass and windows.

Finally, the SCL, or solar cooling load factor, accounts for the variables associated with solar heat load. These include the global coordinates of the site and the size of the structure.

== Equations ==
The equations for the use of the data retrieved from these tables are very simple.

Q= heat gain, usually heat gain per unit time

A= surface area

U= Overall heat transfer coefficient

CLTD= cooling load temperature difference

SCL= solar cooling load factor

CLF= cooling load factor

SC= shading coefficient

=== For heat gain through walls, doors, roofs, and windows (only window conduction) ===
Q = U*A*CLTD

Q = U*A*(T2-T1)

Where Q = Overall heat transfer in Btu per hour

     U = Overall heat transfer coefficient in Btu/(ft2-hr-deg F)
     A = Area in square feet
     T1 = outdoor temperature in degrees F
     T2 = indoor temperature in degrees F

=== For heat gains due to people, equipment (hooded and unhooded), and lighting ===
Q = Q*CLF

=== For solar heat gains through windows and glazed surfaces ===
Q = A*SC*SCL

=== Data tables ===
In addition to tables published by ASHRAE for select latitudes, a computer program called CLTDTAB, released in 1993 and no longer available, could have been used to generate custom CLTD/CLF/SCL tables for a specific zone type for any latitude and month. This used to allow the use of this method, without interpolation, for any area in the world.

If a program similar CLTDTAB is used, the results obtained using this method will tend to be very close to the more rigorous TFM Method mentioned earlier. CLTDTAB is no longer available, similar software can be purchased and downloaded.
