= Monitor (architecture) =

Raised structure running along the ridge of a double-pitched roof

An example of a monitor roof. These roofs may extend the length of the building.

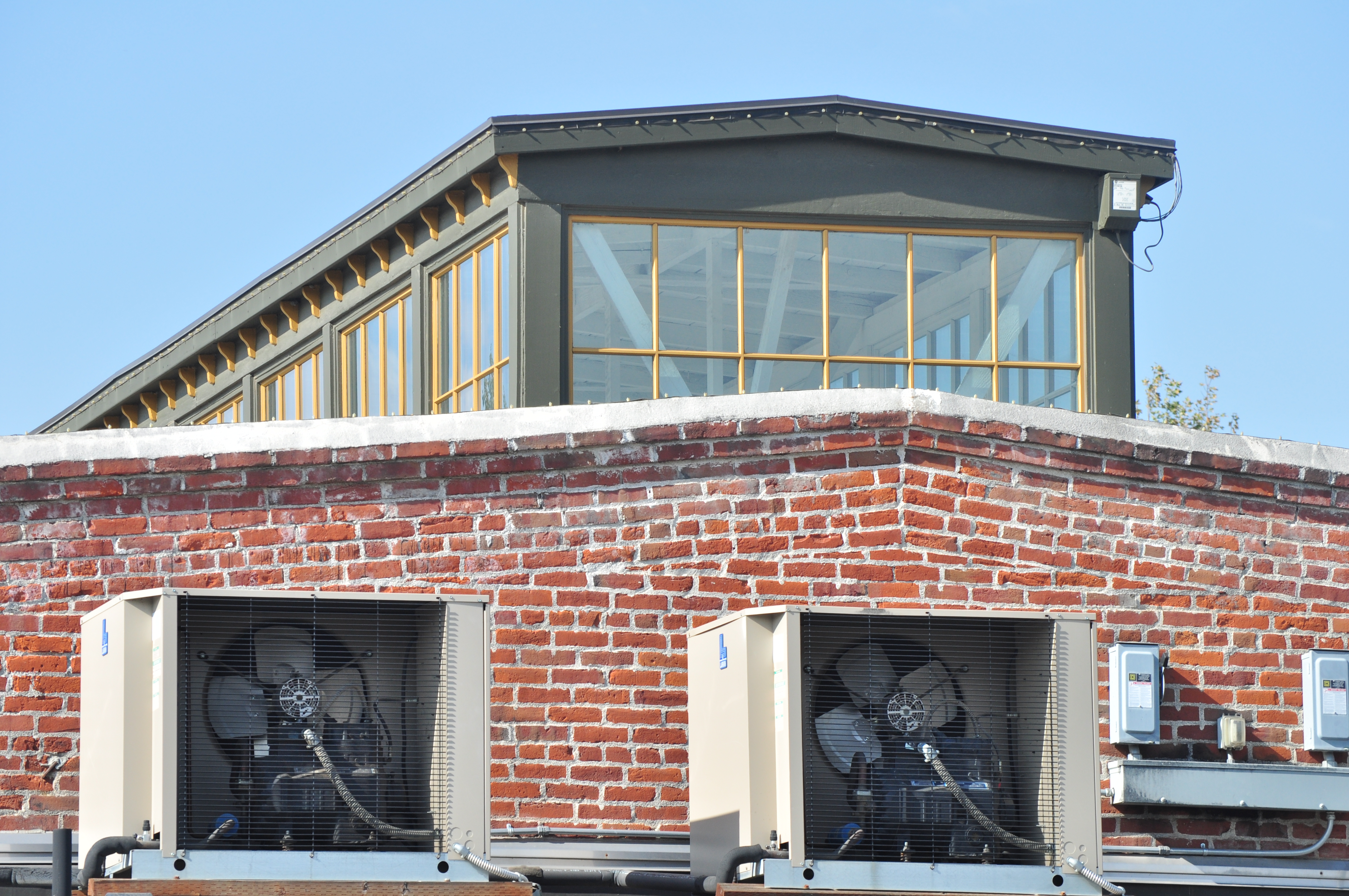
Monitor on the Whitehouse-Crawford Planing Mill in Walla Walla, Washington, U.S.

A monitor in architecture is a raised structure running along the ridge of a double-pitched roof, with its own roof running parallel with the main roof. The long sides of monitors usually contain clerestory windows or louvers to light or ventilate the area under the roof. A monitor roof looks like the roof of a traditional sugar house (building for boiling down maple syrup) but the purpose of the sugar house roof is to vent steam. Historically, some railroad passenger cars had monitor roofs.

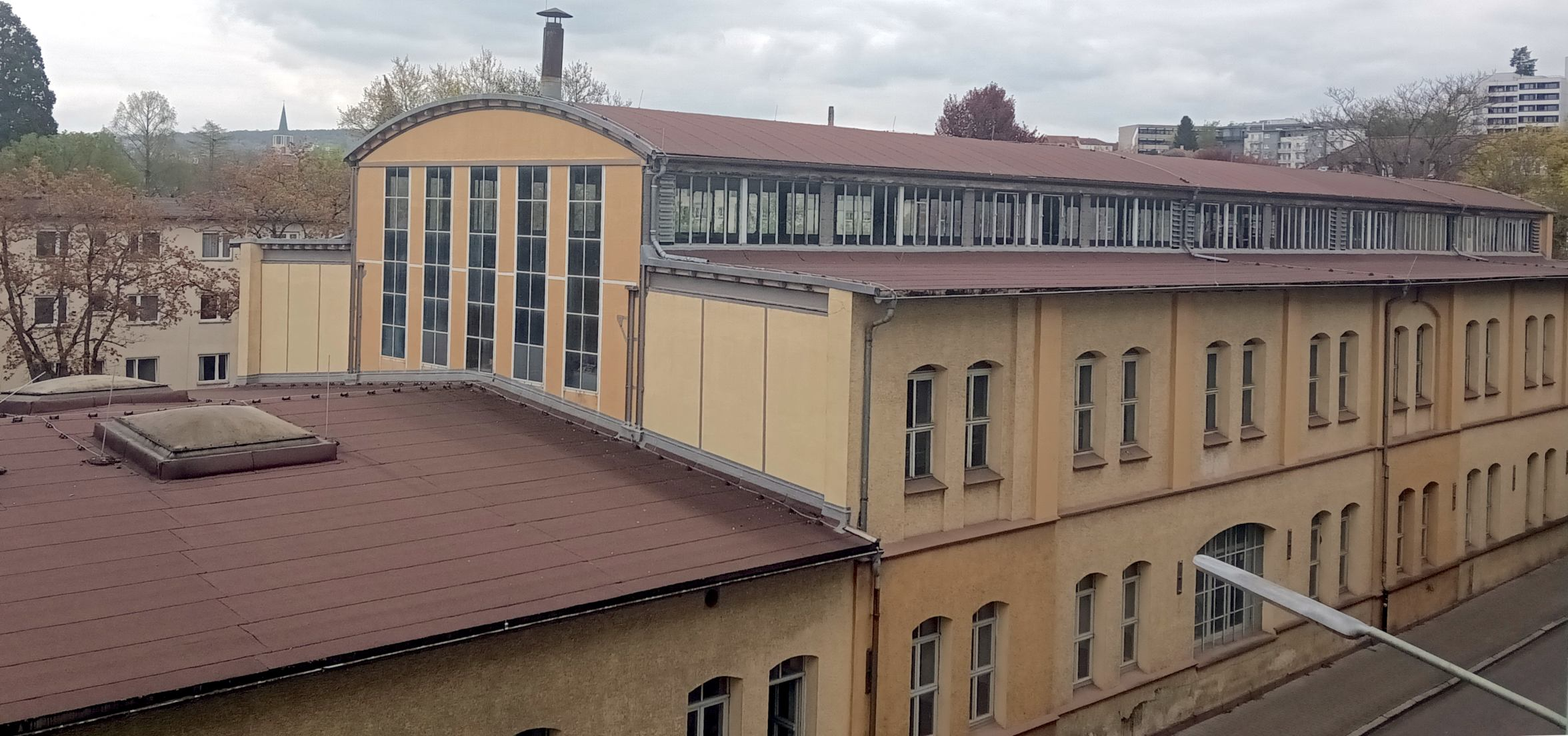
Roof of the historic Benckiser factory in Pforzheim

== See also ==
- Roof lantern
- Säteri roof
