= M. S. Whitcomb Farm =

- M.S. Whitcomb Farm
- U.S. National Register of Historic Places
- U.S. Historic district
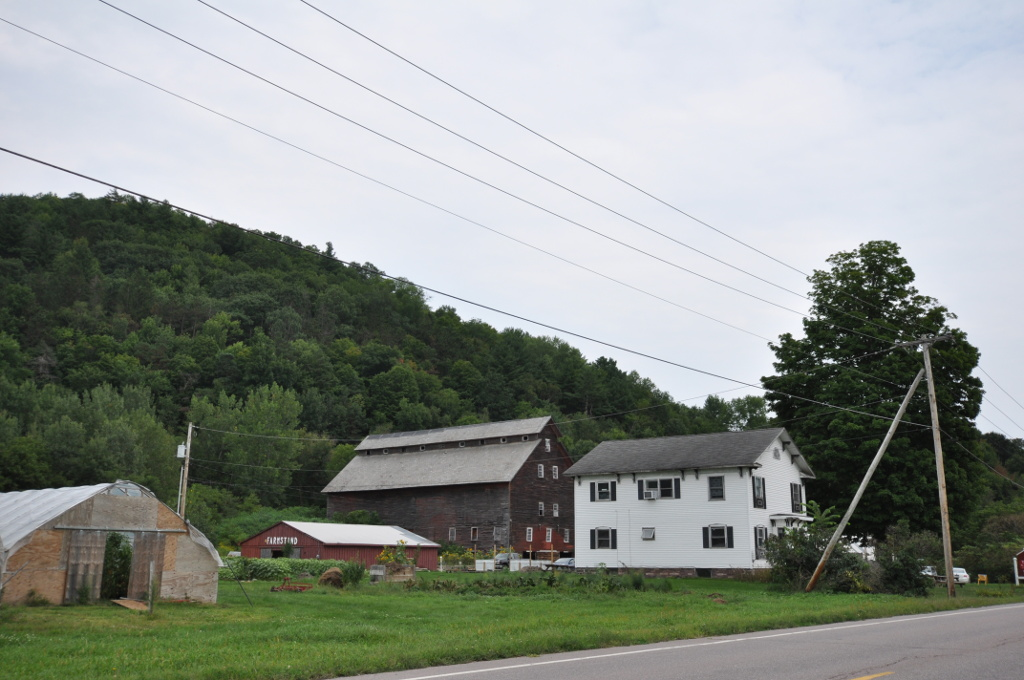

- Location within Vermont Location within the United States
- Location: US 2, Richmond, Vermont
- Coordinates: 44°23′45″N 72°57′25″W
- Area: 170 acres (69 ha)
- Built: 1851
- Architectural style: Bank Barn
- MPS: Agricultural Resources of Vermont MPS
- NRHP reference No.: 93001010
- Added to NRHP: September 30, 1993

The M.S. Whitcomb Farm is a historic farm property on United States Route 2 in Richmond, Vermont. Established in the 1850s as a horse farm, it has seen agricultural use in some form since then. Its most distinguishing feature is a large bank barn with a monitor roof, built in 1901. The property, now 170 acres (69 ha), was listed on the National Register of Historic Places in 1993.

== Description and history ==
The Whitcomb Farm property is located about 1.5 miles (2.4 km) east of the village center of Richmond, on a roughly triangular parcel that abuts Interstate 89 to the south and is divided by US 2. The area south of US 2 is mainly bottomlands of the Winooski River, and have traditionally been used for crops, while the area north of that road is hillier, and has traditionally been used as pastureland. The farmstead complex is set on the north side of US 2, and is roughly centered on the farm's road frontage. The complex's most prominent feature, visible from the interstate, is a large three-story bank barn with a monitor roof. At the western end of the farmstead is a 2-1/2 story wood frame farmhouse with Italianate appearance; it is a reconstruction (using some surviving elements) of an 1875 building that burned down in 1982. To the right of the bank barn is a round-roofed metal storage barn built about 1975.

This land was cleared for farming sometime in the early 19th century. It was in 1821 the birthplace of George F. Edmunds, a United States Senator from Vermont. The farm in its present form was started in the early 1850s by William Freeman as a horse breeding operation, which he sold in 1854 to M.S. Manwell. This farm and other surrounding land were consolidated by the late 1880s into a single predominantly dairy operation by Moses S. Whitcomb. He is credited with building the monitor-roofed bank barn in 1901; it is one of the only barns of this type in the entire state.

== See also ==
- National Register of Historic Places listings in Chittenden County, Vermont
