= Raised floor =

Elevated structural floor above a void

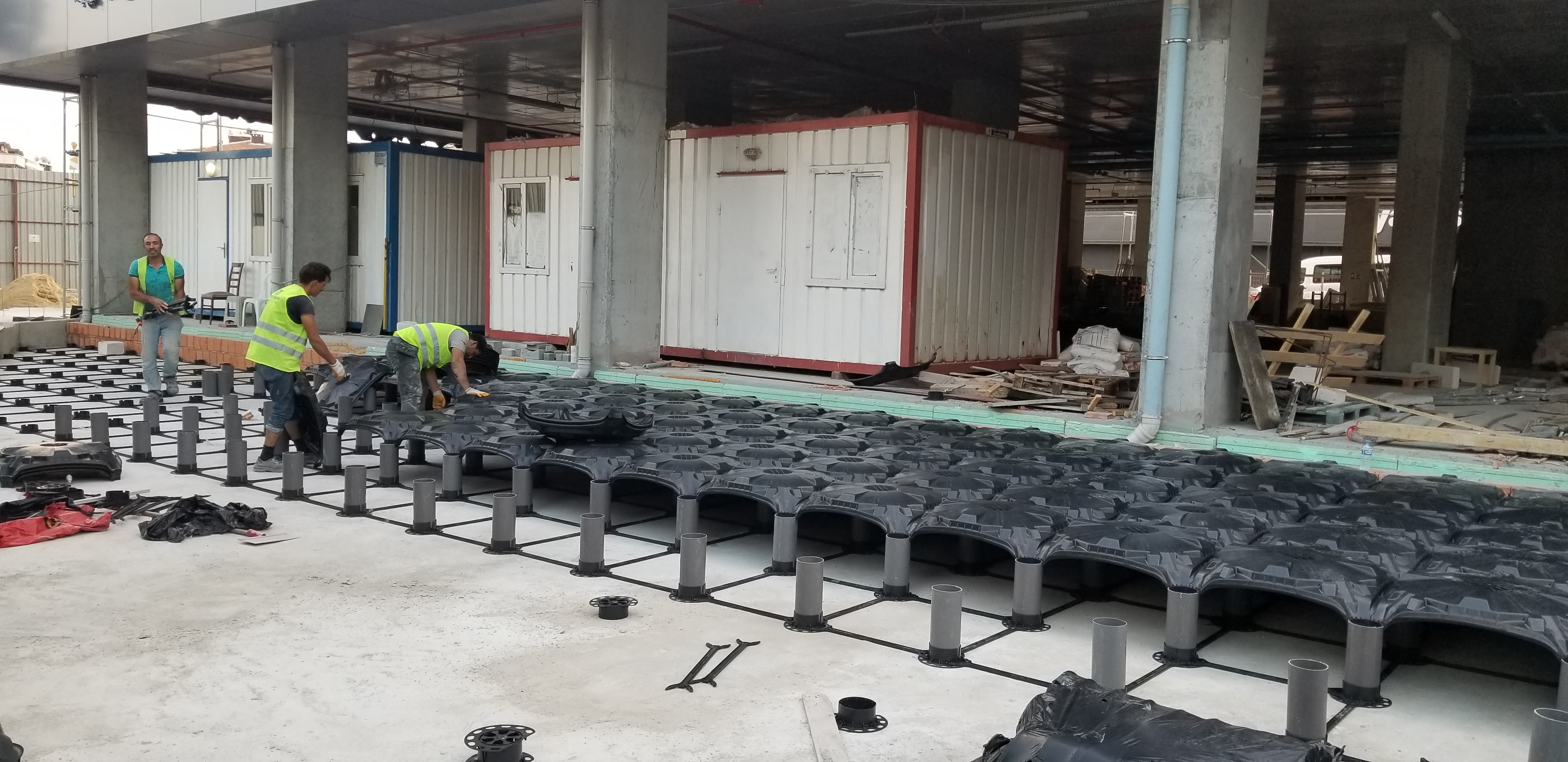
An alternative raised floor application with disposable formworks from job site in Turkey

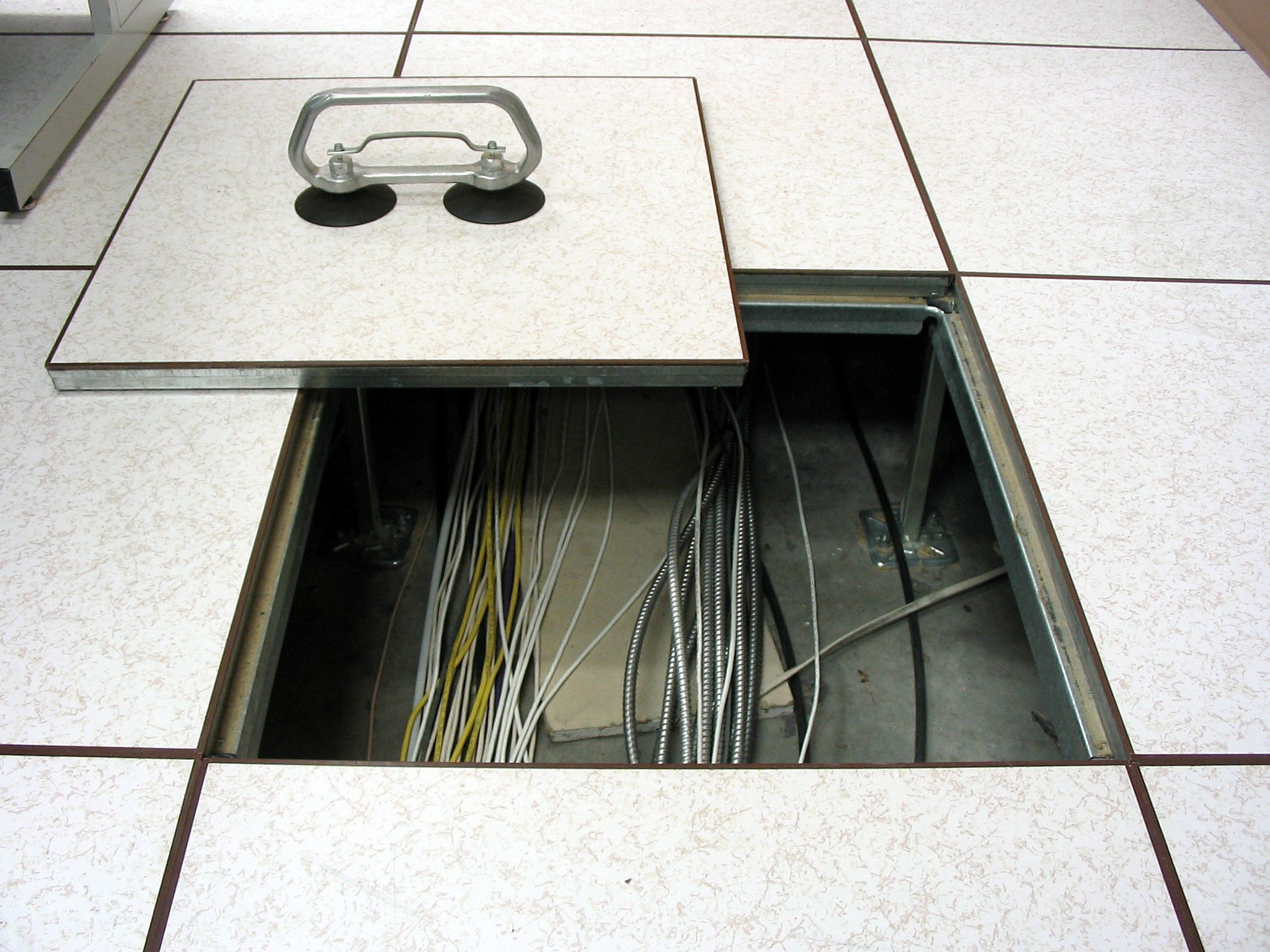
A suction-cup tile lifter has been used to remove a tile.

A raised floor (also raised flooring, access floor(ing), or raised-access computer floor) provides an elevated structural floor above a solid substrate (often a concrete slab) to create a hidden void for the passage of mechanical and electrical services. Optionally, the void below the floor may also serve as a plenum to circulate conditioned air within the room.

== Description ==
Raised floors are widely used in modern office buildings, and in specialized areas such as command centers, information technology data centers, and computer rooms, where there is a requirement to route mechanical services and cables, wiring, and electrical supply. Such flooring can be installed at varying heights from 2 inches (51 mm) to heights above 4 feet (1.2 m) to suit services that may be accommodated beneath. Additional structural support and lighting are often provided when a floor is raised enough for a person to crawl or even walk beneath.

In the US, underfloor air distribution is becoming a more common way to cool a room, by using the void below the raised floor as a plenum chamber to distribute conditioned air, a practice which has been done in Europe since the 1970s. In data centers, isolated air-conditioning zones are often associated with raised floors. Perforated tiles are traditionally placed beneath computer systems to direct conditioned air directly to them. In turn, the computing equipment is often designed to draw cooling air from below, and to exhaust into the room. An air conditioning unit then draws air from the room, filters and cools it, and forces it beneath the raised floor, completing the cycle.

=== Low-profile non-plenum alternative ===
Decades later, an alternative approach to raised floor has evolved to manage underfloor cable distribution for a wider range of applications where underfloor air distribution is not required. In 2009 a separate category of raised floor was established by Construction Specifications Institute (CSI) and Construction Specifications Canada (CSC) to separate the related, but very different, approaches to raised flooring.

In this case, the term raised floor includes "low-profile fixed-height access flooring". Offices, classrooms, conference rooms, retail spaces, museums, studios, and more, have the primary need to quickly and easily accommodate changes of technology and floor plan configurations. Underfloor air distribution is not included in this approach since a plenum chamber is not created. The low-profile fixed-height distinction reflects the system's height ranges from as low as 1.6 to 2.75 inches (41 to 70 mm); and the floor panels are manufactured with integral support (instead of traditional separate pedestals and panels). Cabling channels are directly accessible under light-weight cover plates.

== Design ==
The traditional type of floor consists of a gridded metal framework or substructure of adjustable-height supports (called "pedestals") that provide support for removable (liftable) floor panels, which are usually 2 by 2 feet (0.61 m × 0.61 m). The height of the legs/pedestals is dictated by the volume of cables and other services provided beneath, but typically arranged for a clearance of at least 6 inches (150 mm) with typical heights between 24 and 48 inches (610 and 1,220 mm).

The panels are normally made of steel-clad particleboard or a steel panel with a cementitious internal core, although some tiles have hollow cores. Panels may be covered with a variety of flooring finishes to suit the application, such as carpet tiles, high-pressure laminates, marble, stone, and antistatic finishes for use in computer rooms and laboratories. When using a panel with a cement top surface the panels are sometimes left bare and sealed or stained and sealed to create a tile appearance and save the customer money. This bare application is used most often in office area, hallways, lobbies, museums, casinos, etc.

=== Adaptive cable management ===
A contemporary low-profile fixed height type of cable management access floor differs from traditional access floor by requiring much less ramping floor space at floor height transitions, and can even be eliminated in new construction with slab depressions. The primary advantages are realized by much lighter weight panels for easier handling. No tools are required to make changes, and organized cable channel pathways are integral to the system.

Time and expense is greatly reduced during installation, and every time changes are made in the future during the life of the building. Since this type of access floor is not attached to the structure, it is considered to be furnishings, fixtures, and equipment (FF&E) that can be a depreciated expense or leased. Since the underfloor cabling is not in a plenum, the expense of plenum rated cable is not required.

=== Computer centers ===
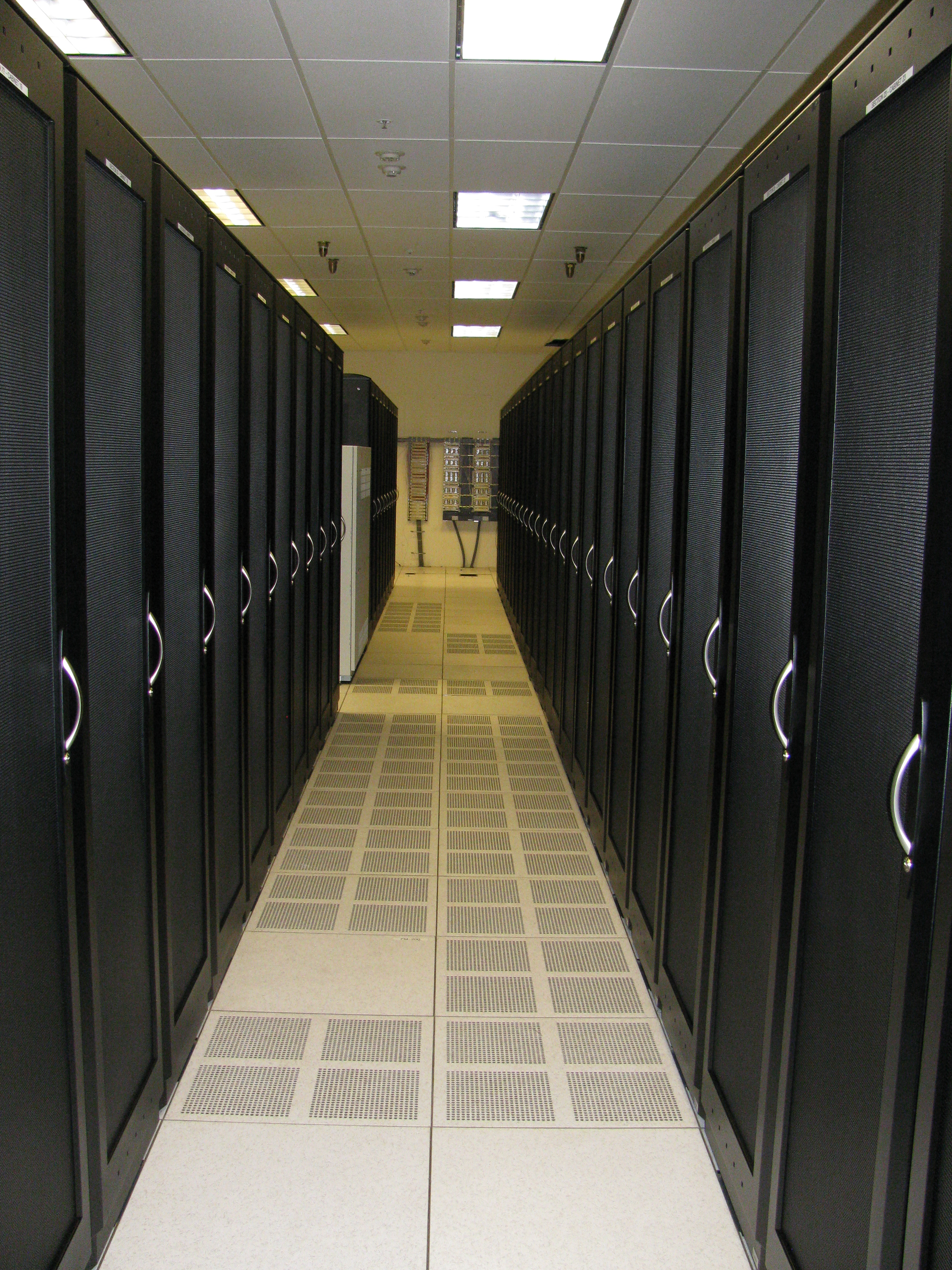
Server cabinet aisle on raised floor with cooling panels

Many modern computer and equipment rooms employ an underfloor air distribution to ensure even cooling of the room with minimal wasted energy. Conditioned air is provided under the floor and dispersed upward into the room through regularly spaced diffuser tiles, blowers or through ducts directed into specific equipment. Automatic fire protection shutoffs may be required for underfloor ventilation, and additional suppression systems may be installed in case of underfloor fires.

=== Office buildings ===
Many office buildings use access flooring to create more flexible and sustainable spaces. A large corporation can have over 20,000 miles (32,000 km) of cabling in a single facility.

When underfloor air is designed into a building from the start of the project, the building can be less expensive to build and less expensive to operate over the life of the building. Underfloor air requires less space per floor, thereby reducing the overall height of the building, which in turn reduces the cost of the building facade. The blowers and air handlers required for underfloor air are much smaller and require less energy, since hot air rises naturally through the space as it comes in contact with people and equipment that warm the air and it rises to the ceiling.

Another advantage is that when buildings are designed to combine modular electrical, modular walls, and access floor, the space within the building can be reconfigured within a few hours, as compared to historical means of demolishing walls and drilling holes in the floor to route electrical and other services. As more companies construct or renovate buildings to meet Leadership in Energy & Environmental Design (LEED), underfloor air and access floor usage will continue to grow. The U.S. Green Building Council (USGBC) states that 40–48 percent of new nonresidential construction is green.

=== General commercial use ===
Raised access flooring is commonplace in office accommodation, retail spaces, computer and control rooms. There are two benchmarks for performance testing in the United Kingdom, these being the "PSA MOB PF2 PS (spu) 1992" and the more recent, slightly less stringent "BS/EN12825". These set out defined static loading criteria for the raised access floor to meet.

The maximum loading of raised access flooring for general office accommodation (PSA medium grade) is 8 kilonewtons per square metre (kN/m^{2}) uniformly distributed load (UDL) and a 3.0 kN point load. There is an additional 3x safety factor applied to the loadings. Computer and control rooms including data centers generally have a higher requirement with regards to static loadings and PSA heavy grade should be employed. This provides 12 kN/m^{2} UDL and a 4.5 kN point load, again with a 3x safety factor applied.

=== Residential use ===
While major wiring may not be the focus, residential use of raised floors and split levels in 12-foot-ceiling (3.7 m) Manhattan apartments provides "high-performance elements" and added functionality.

== Panel lifter tools ==
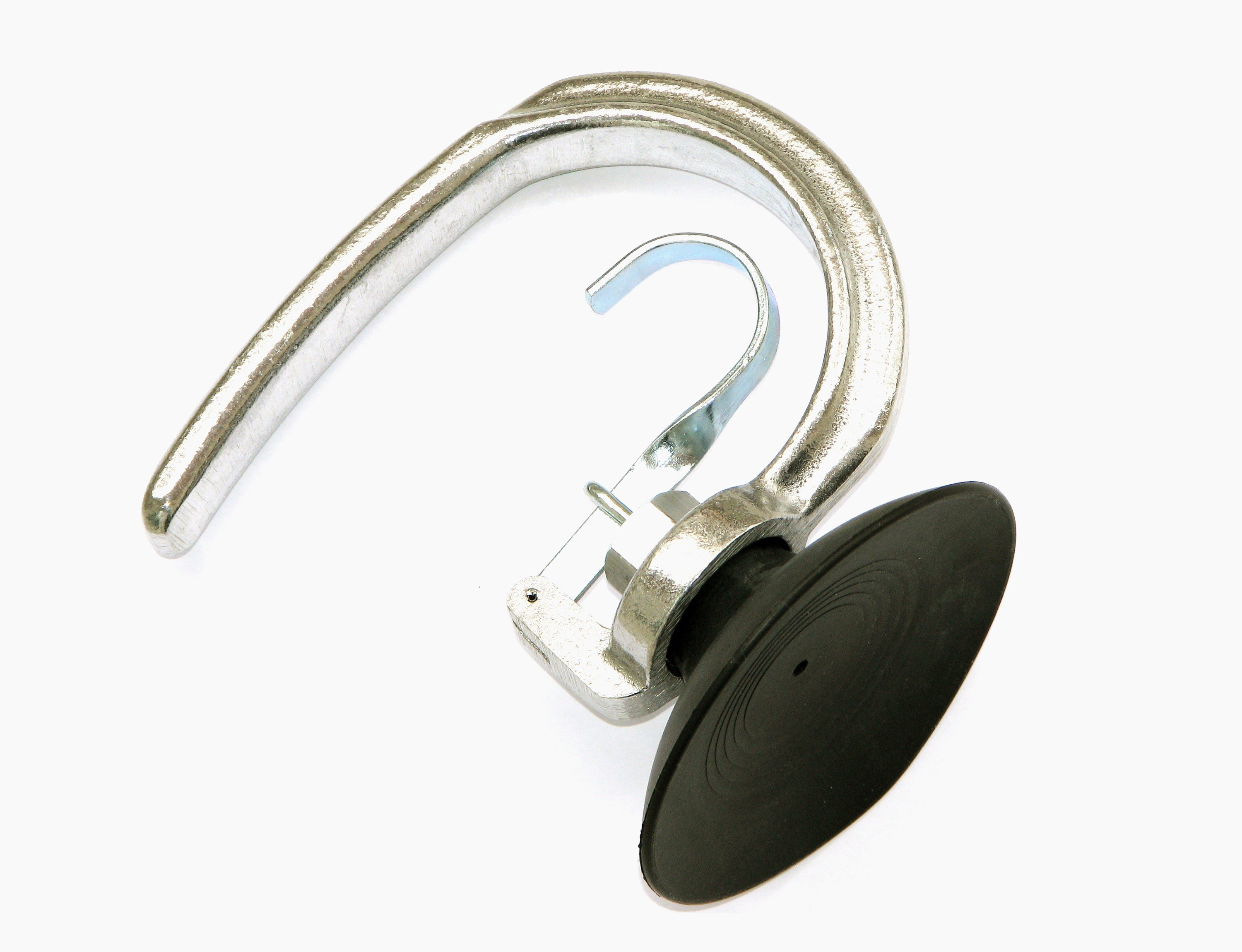
One-cup suction lifter

To remove panels, a tool with a suction cup on the end (referred to as a "floor puller", "tile lifter", or "suction lifter") is used. A hook-and-loop lifter may be used on carpeted panels. Low-profile fixed height access flooring is held in place by gravity without glue or fasteners, and does not require any tools to make changes.

== Structural problems ==
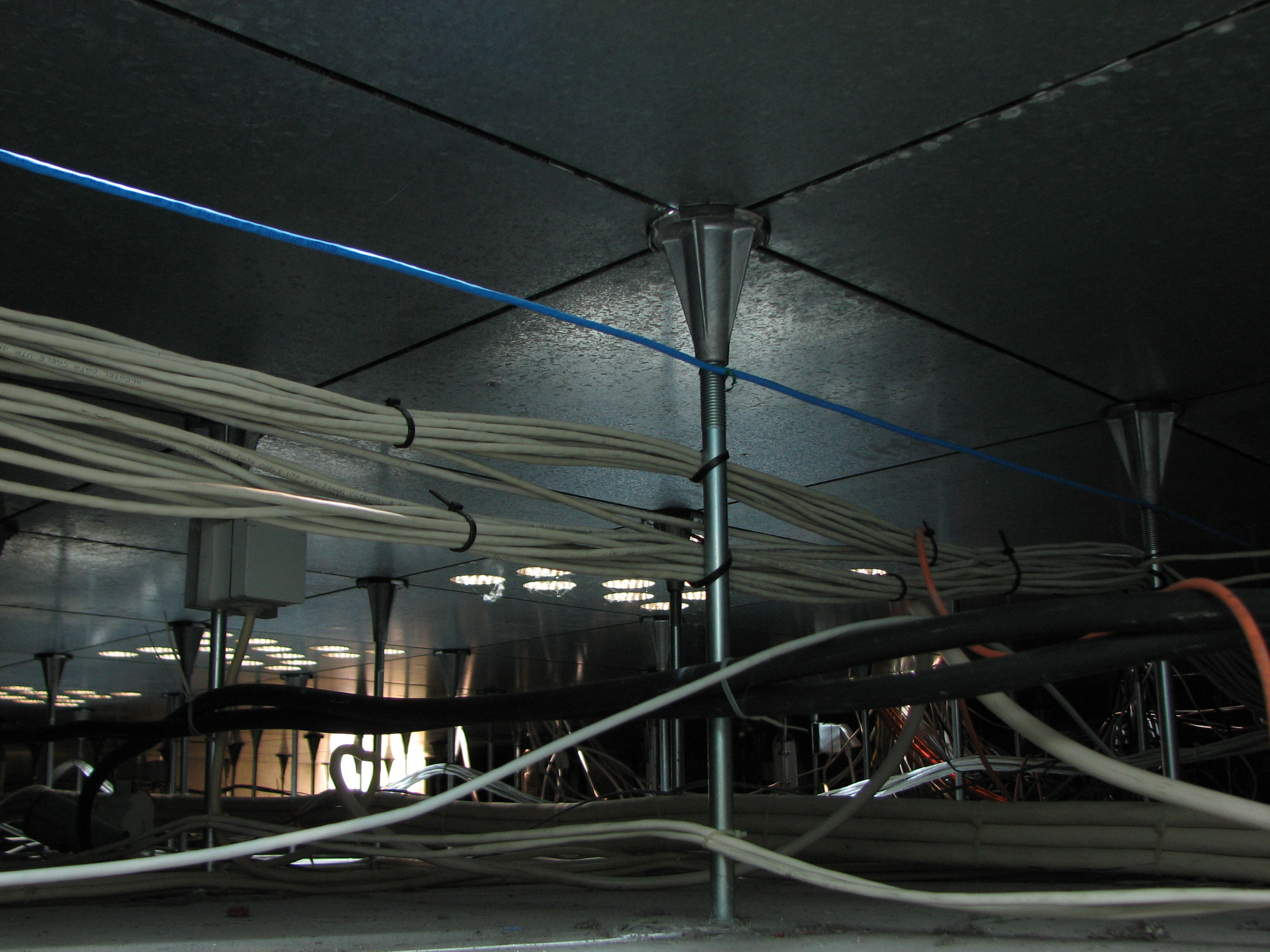
Beneath a raised floor

Structural problems, such as rocking panels and gaps between panels, can cause significant damage to equipment and injury to personnel. Regular inspections for the structural integrity of a raised floor system can help to identify and mitigate problems. Equipment and floor damage can happen when using flooring that does not meet load demands. Load ratings range from 1,000 to 25,000 pounds (0.45–11.34 t). Higher-rated panels can be used on heavily-loaded areas of a floor, whereas lower-rated panels can be used on other areas. During installation, attention should be paid to the condition of the subfloor, which should be clean of debris and should be as level as possible. The walls surrounding the raised floor should be as square as possible to minimize the need for cutting raised floor panels and to minimize rocking panels and gaps. Low-profile, fixed-height systems can accommodate irregularly-shaped rooms with adjustable border components which minimize cutting of panels.

== Other problems ==
Because the flooring tiles are rarely removed once equipment has been installed, the space below them is seldom cleaned, and fluff and other debris settles, making working on cabling underneath the flooring a dirty job. Smoke detectors under the raised floor can be triggered by workers disturbing the dust, resulting in false alarms.

== Cooling load implications ==
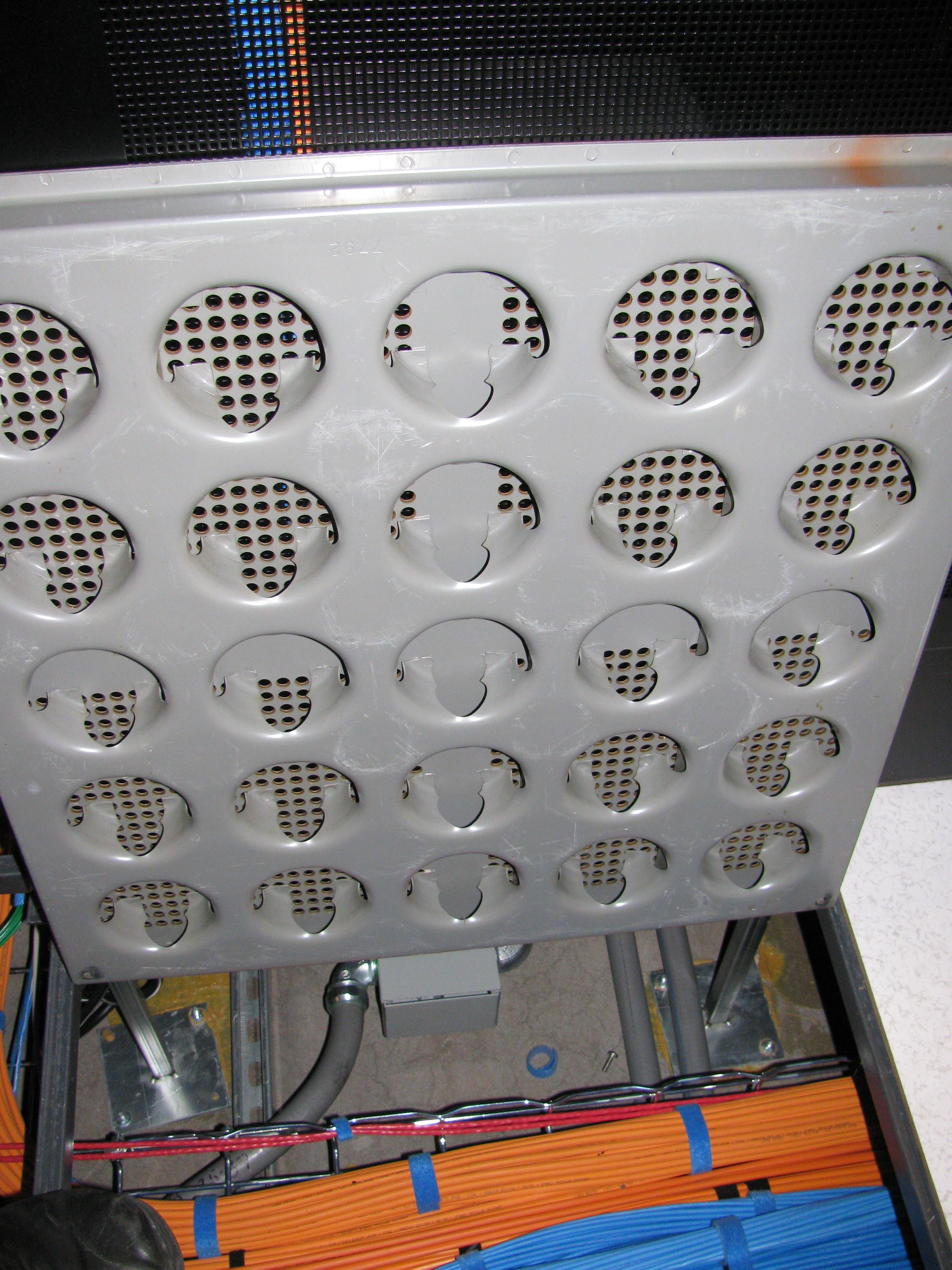
Perforated cooling floor tile

The installation of a raised floor system can change the thermal behavior of the building by reducing the interaction between the heat gains and the thermally massive concrete slab. The raised floor serves as a separation between the room and the slab. Energy simulations of an office building located in San Francisco showed that the mere presence of the raised floor affects the zone cooling load profile and tends to increase the peak cooling load. When carpeting is present the negative impact of the raised floor on zone peak cooling load may be reduced.

== Telecommunications data center applications ==
Raised floors available for general purpose use typically do not address the special requirements needed for telecommunications applications.

The general types of raised floors in telecommunications data centers include: stringerless, stringered, and structural platforms; and, truss assemblies.

- Stringerless raised floors: an array of pedestals that provide the necessary height for routing cables and also serve to support each corner of the floor panels.
- Stringered raised floors: a vertical array of steel pedestal assemblies (steel base plate, tubular upright, and a head) uniformly spaced on 2-foot (0.61 m) centers and mechanically fastened to the concrete floor.
- Structural platforms: members constructed of steel angles or channels that are welded or bolted together to form an integrated platform for supporting equipment.
- Truss assemblies: utilizing attachment points to the subfloor to support a truss network on which the floor panels rest. The truss has high lateral strength and transfers lateral loads to the subfloor with less strain than possible with a vertical pedestal assembly.

A telecommunications facility may contain continuous lineups of equipment cabinets. The most densely populated installation configuration would consist of rows of continuous 2-foot-wide equipment cabinets with aisles that separate 2-foot-wide adjacent rows. This lineup configuration is considered to be the most densely populated in terms of square foot area and, therefore, the largest floor load anticipated for a raised floor system. Considering prorated aisle space, a single equipment cabinet will then occupy an 8-square-foot (0.74 m^{2}) floor area (4 ft^{2} or 0.37 m^{2} for the cabinet and 4 sq ft of aisle).

The data center can be located in remote locations, and is subject to physical and electrical stresses from sources such as fires and from electrical faults.

The environment drives the installation methods for raised floors, including site preparation, cable and cable racking, bonding and grounding, and fire resistance. The actual installation should be in accordance with the customer's practices.

== Information technology data centers and computer rooms ==
Raised floors for Data centers, and in particular rooms, have a history and a set of specifications.

=== Telcordia GR-2930 ===
Telcordia NEBS: Raised Floor Generic Requirements for Network and Data Centers, GR-2930 presents generic engineering requirements for raised floors that fall within the strict NEBS guidelines. There are many types of commercially available floors that offer a wide range of structural strength and loading capabilities, depending on component construction and the materials used. The general types of raised floors include stringer, stringerless, and structural platforms, all of which are discussed in detail in GR-2930. This design permits equipment to be fastened directly to the platform without the need for toggle bars or supplemental bracing. Structural platforms may or may not contain panels or stringers; they are not recommend in earthquake-prone locations. Data centers typically have raised flooring made up of 60 cm (2 ft) removable square tiles. The trend is towards 80–100 cm (31–39 in) void height to allow better, more uniform air distribution. These cavities provide a plenum for air to circulate below the floor, as part of the air conditioning system, as well as providing space for power cabling.

=== Metal whiskers ===
Raised floors and other metal structures such as cable trays and ventilation ducts have caused many problems with zinc whiskers in the past, and likely are still present in many data centers. This happens when microscopic metallic filaments form on metals such as zinc or tin that protect many metal structures and electronic components from corrosion. Maintenance on a raised floor or installing of cable etc. can dislodge the whiskers, which enter the airflow and may short circuit server components or power supplies, sometimes through a high current metal vapor plasma arc.

This phenomenon is not unique to data centers, and has also caused catastrophic failures of satellites and military hardware.

== See also ==
- Room air distribution
- Suspended ceiling
- Underfloor air distribution
- Utility tunnel
