= Underfloor air distribution =

Technique for ventilation of a building

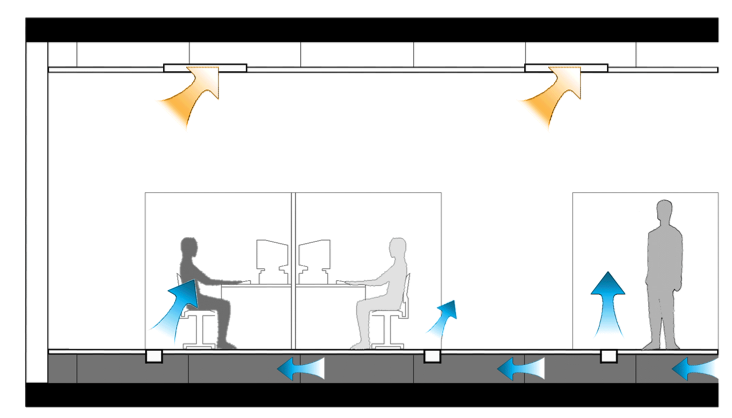
Diagram of air movement in an underfloor air distribution system

Underfloor air distribution (UFAD) is an air distribution strategy for providing ventilation and space conditioning in buildings as part of the design of a HVAC system. UFAD systems use an underfloor supply plenum located between the structural concrete slab and a raised floor system to supply conditioned air to supply outlets (usually floor diffusers), located at or near floor level within the occupied space. Air returns from the room at ceiling level or the maximum allowable height above the occupied zone.

The UFAD system takes advantage of the thermal plume and stratification phenomenon: the conditioned air is supplied directly to the occupied zone (OZ). The thermal plumes generated by the occupants and other heat sources introduce the conditioned air to absorb the heat and humidity and then bring the contaminated air to the upper zone (UZ). At a certain plane in the room, the airflow rate returned to the upper zone is equal to the supply air. The plane divides the room into occupied zone and upper zone and leads to thermal stratification: the hot and contaminated air is concentrated in the upper zone, and the air in the occupied zone is cool and fresh.

UFAD can bring several potential advantages over traditional overhead systems, including reduced life-cycle building costs; improved thermal comfort, occupant satisfaction, and productivity; improved ventilation efficiency, indoor air quality, and health; reduced energy use and static pressures; and reduced floor-to-floor height in new construction. An under-floor air distribution concept combined with a ceiling-distributed returns ventilation layout (UFAD-CDR) can dramatically reduce the risk of airborne transmission at both high and low ACHs. The UFAD system was originally introduced in the 1950s for rooms with high heat loads and raised floors systems for cable and equipment management (e.g. computer rooms, control centers, etc.). The system was introduced into office buildings in the 1970s in West Germany, with the addition of occupant-controlled localized supply diffusers. Nowadays UFAD system has achieved considerable acceptance in Europe, South Africa, and Japan.

UFAD is often used in office buildings, particularly highly-reconfigurable and open plan offices where raised floors are desirable for cable management. UFAD is appropriate for a number of different building types including commercials, schools, churches, airports, museums, libraries, etc. Notable buildings using the UFAD system in North America include The New York Times Building, Bank of America Tower and San Francisco Federal Building. Careful considerations need to be made in the construction phase of UFAD systems to ensure a well-sealed plenum to avoid air leakage in UFAD supply plenums.

== System description ==
UFAD systems rely on air handling units to filter and condition air to the appropriate supply conditions so it can be delivered to the occupied zone. While overhead systems typically use ducts to distribute the air, UFAD systems use the underfloor plenum formed by installation of a raised floor. The plenum generally sits 0.3 and 0.46 metres (12 and 18 in) above the structural concrete slab, although lower heights are possible. Specially designed floor diffusers are used as the supply outlets. The most common UFAD configuration consists of a central air handling unit delivering air through a pressurized plenum and into the space through floor diffusers. Other approaches may incorporate fan powered terminal units at the outlets, underfloor ducts, desktop vents or connections to Personal Environmental Control Systems.

== UFAD air distribution and stratification ==
Thermal stratification is the result of processes which layer the internal air in accordance with relative density. The resulting air stratum is a vertical gradient with high-density and cooler air below and low-density and warmer air above. Due to the naturally convective movement of air, stratification is used predominantly in cooling conditions.

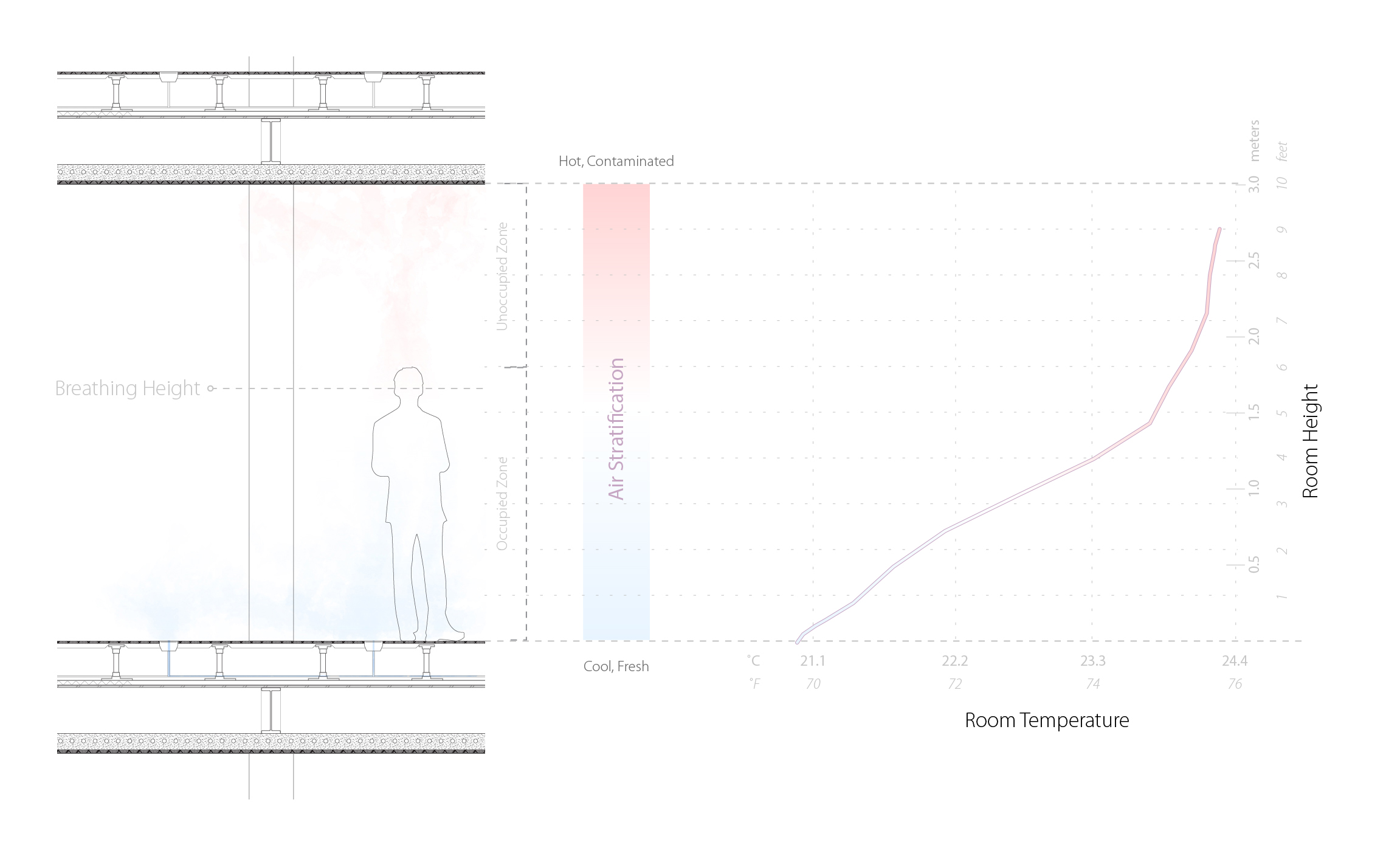
Air stratification capitalizes on thermal buoyancy to layer high quality supply air at occupant level and leave unoccupied air unconditioned.

UFAD systems capitalize on the natural stratification that occurs when warm air rises due to thermal buoyancy. In a UFAD design, conditioned air stays in the lower, occupied part of the room, while heat sources such as occupants and equipment generate thermal plumes, which carry the warm air and heat source generated pollutants towards the ceiling where they are exhausted through the return air ducts. The temperature stratification created by the UFAD system has implication for space setpoints. Most of an occupant's body is in an area that is colder than the temperature at the thermostat height; therefore, current practice recommends raising thermostat setpoints compared to traditional overhead systems. The optimal ventilation strategy controls the supply outlets to limit the mixing of supply air with room air to just below the breathing height of the space. Above this height, stratified and more polluted air is allowed to occur. The air that the occupant breathes will have a lower concentration of contaminants compared to conventional uniformly mixed systems.

The theoretical behavior of UFAD systems is based on the plume theory for DV systems. In comparison to classic displacement ventilation (DV) systems that deliver air at low velocities, typical UFAD systems deliver air through floor diffusers with higher supply air velocities. In addition to increasing the amount of mixing (and therefore potentially diminishing the ventilation performance compared to DV systems), these more powerful supply air conditions can have significant impacts on room air stratification and thermal comfort in the occupied zone. Therefore, the control and optimization of this stratification is crucial to system design and sizing, energy-efficient operation, and comfort performance of UFAD systems.

Many factors, including the ceiling height, diffuser characteristics, number of diffusers, supply air temperature, total flow rate, cooling load and conditioning mode affect the ventilation efficiency of UFAD systems. Swirl and perforated-floor-panel diffusers have been shown to create a low air velocity in the occupied zone, while linear diffusers created the highest velocity in the occupied zone, disturbing thermal stratification and posing a potential draft risk. Additionally, floor diffusers add an element of personal control within the reach of the occupant, as users can adjust the amount of air that is delivered by the diffuser though rotating the diffuser top.

== Application Characteristics ==
=== UFAD cooling load ===
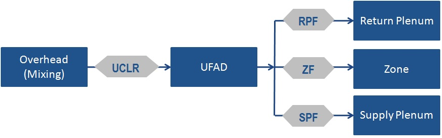
Schematic flow diagram of calculation procedure showing transformation from cooling load calculated for an overhead mixing system into a UFAD cooling load, and then divided between the supply plenum, zone (room), and return plenum.

Cooling load profiles for UFAD systems and overhead systems are different, mainly due to the thermal storage effect of the lighter-weight raised floor panels compared to the heavier mass of a structural floor slab. The mere presence of the raised floor reduces the ability of the slab to store heat, thereby producing for the system with a raised floor higher peak cooling loads compared to the system without a raised floor. In the OH system, particularly in perimeter zones, part of the incoming solar heat gain is stored in the floor slab during the day, thus reducing peak zone cooling loads, and released at night when the system is off. In a UFAD system, the presence of the raised flooring transforms the solar absorbing massive floor slab into a lighter weight material, leading to relatively higher peak zone cooling loads. A modeling study based on EnergyPlus simulations showed that, generally, UFAD has a peak cooling load 19% higher than an overhead cooling load and 22% and 37% of the total zone UFAD cooling load goes to the supply plenum in the perimeter and interior, respectively.

Center for the Built Environment developed a new index UFAD cooling load ratio (UCLR), which is defined by the ratio of the peak cooling load calculated for UFAD to the peak cooling load calculated for a well-mixed system, to calculate the UFAD cooling load for each zone with the traditional peak cooling load of an overhead (well-mixed) system. UCLR is determined by zone type, floor level and the zone orientation. The Supply Plenum Fraction (SPF), Zone Fraction (ZF) and Return Plenum Fraction (RPF) are developed similarly to calculate the supply plenum, zone and return plenum cooling load.

=== UFAD design tools for zone airflow requirements ===
There are two available design tools for determining zone airflow rate requirements for UFAD system, one is developed at Purdue University as part of the ASHRAE Research Project (RP-1522). The other one is developed at Center for the Built Environment (CBE) at University of California Berkeley.

ASHRAE Research Project (RP-1522) developed a simplified tool that predicts the vertical temperature difference between the head and ankle of occupants, the supply air flow rate for one plenum zone, number of diffusers and the air distribution effectiveness. The tool requires users to specify the zone cooling load and the fraction of the cooling load assigned to the underfloor plenum. It also requires users to input the supply air temperature either at the diffuser or at the duct but with the ratio of plenum flowrate to zonal supply flowrate. The tool allows users to select from three type of diffusers and is applicable to seven type of buildings, including office, classroom, workshop, restaurant, retail shop, conference room and auditorium.

The CBE UFAD design tool based on extensive research is able to predict the cooling load for UFAD system with the input of the design cooling load calculated for the same building with an overhead system. It also predicts the airflow rate, room temperature stratification, and the plenum temperature gain for both interior and perimeter zones of a typical multi-story office buildings using UFAD system. The CBE tool allows the user to select from four different plenum configurations (series, reverse series, independent and common) and three floor-diffusers (swirl, square and linear bar grill). An online version of the design tool is publicly available at Center for the Built Environment.

=== Plenum air temperature rise ===
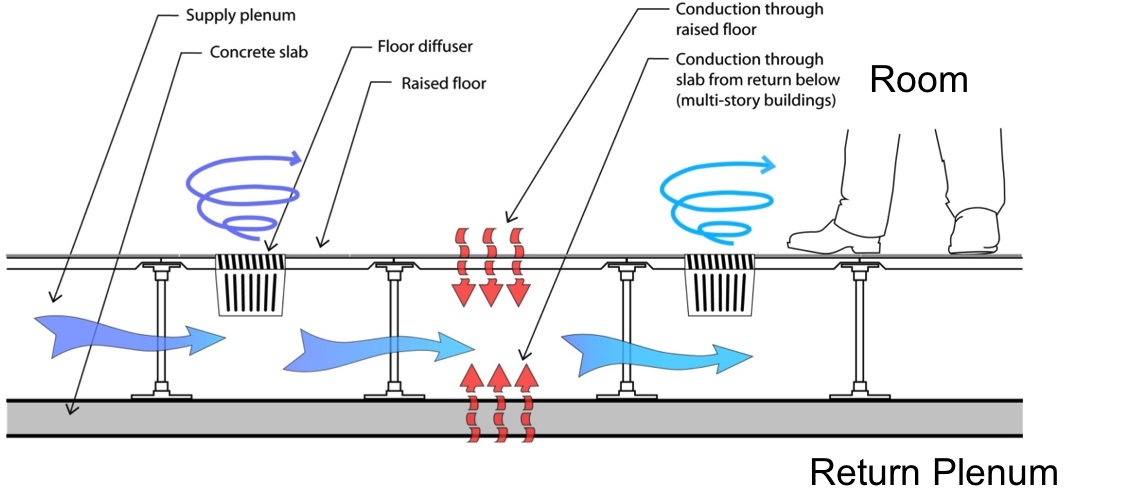
Heat transfer pathways in UFAD system.

Plenum supply air temperature rise is the increase of the conditioned air due to convective heat gain as it travels through the underfloor supply plenum from the plenum inlet to the floor diffusers. This phenomenon is also named thermal decay. Plenum air temperature rise is caused by cool supply air coming into contact with warmer than air concrete slab and raised floor. According to a modeling study, air temperature rise can be quite significant (as much as 5 °C or 9 °F) and subsequently, compared to an idealized simulated UFAD case with no air temperature rise, elevated diffuser air temperatures can lead to higher supply airflow rate and increased fan and chiller energy consumption. The same study found that air temperature rise in summer is higher than in winter and it also depends on the climate. The ground floor with a slab on grade has less temperature rise compared to middle and top floors, and an increase of the supply air temperature causes a decrease in the temperature rise. The temperature rise is not significantly affected by the perimeter zone orientation, the internal heat gain and the window-to-wall ratio. Supply plenum air temperature rise, thus, has implications on the energy saving potential of UFAD systems and their ability to meet cooling requirements with supply temperatures above those of conventional overhead systems. Current research suggests that both energy and thermal performance can be improved in UFAD systems by ducting air to perimeter zones where loads tend to be the greatest. Critics suggest however that such underfloor ducting reduces the benefit of having a low-pressure plenum space, as well as adding design and installation complications when fitting ducts between floor tile pedestals.

=== Air leakage in UFAD plenums ===
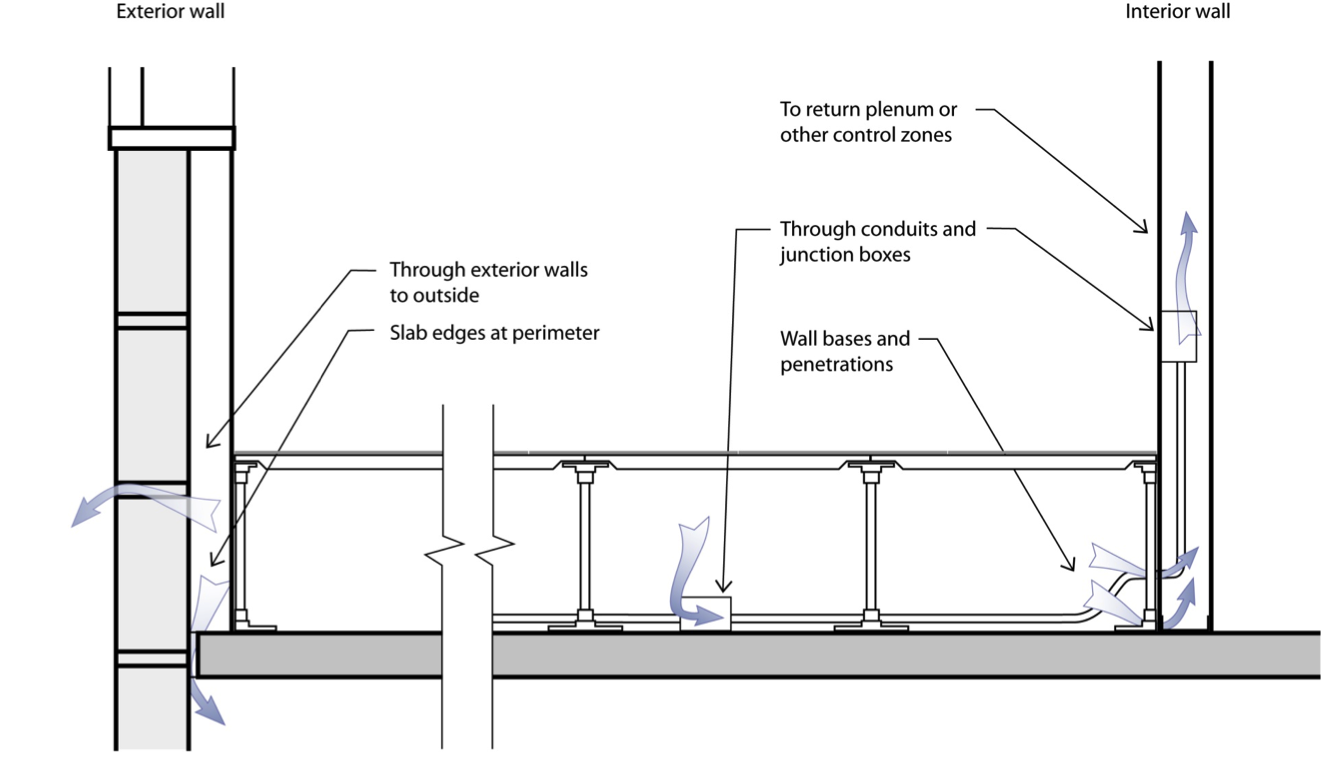
UFAD leakage that does not contribute to cooling, leading to wasted increased fan energy.

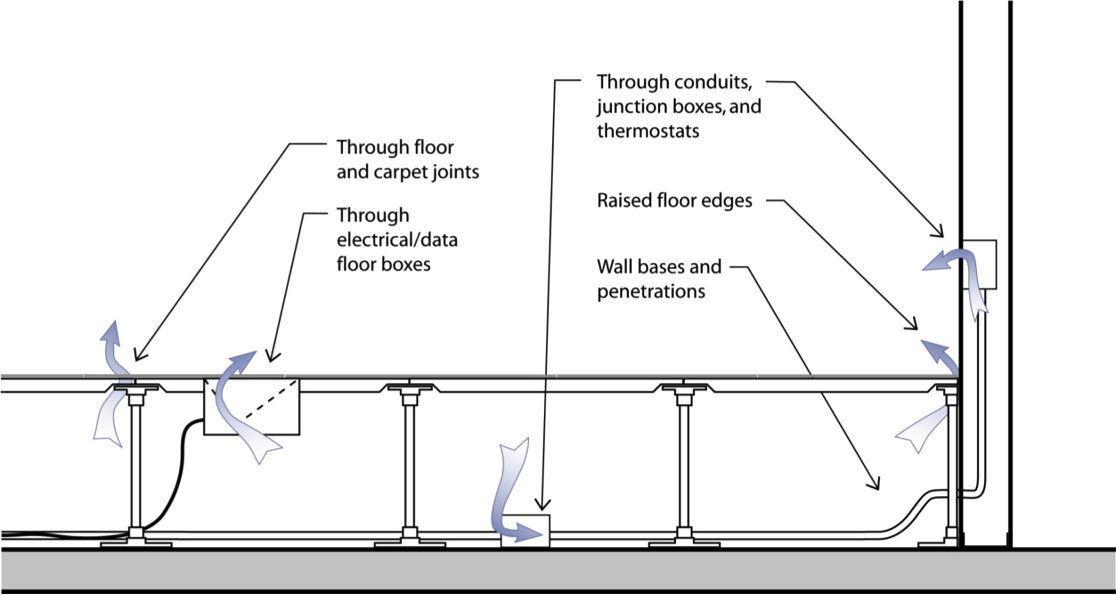
UFAD leakage into the space, contributing to cooling.

Leakage in UFAD supply plenums can be a major cause for inefficiency in a UFAD system. There are two types of leakage—leakage into the space and leakage into pathways that bypass the space. The first category of leakage does not result in an energy penalty because air is getting to the zone it is intended to cool. The second category of leakage increases fan energy in order to maintain a constant plenum pressure, resulting in increased energy use. Careful consideration needs to be paid in the construction phase of UFAD systems to ensure a well-sealed plenum.

=== UFAD and energy ===
The energy assessment of UFAD systems has not been extensive, but some studies indicates potential energy savings due the lower pressure drop and lower air flow rate. Typical plenum pressures are 25 pascals (0.0036 psi) (0.1 inch of water column) or less. UFAD is particularly suitable for buildings with high height ceilings, where the energy saving effect is more pronounced due to thermal stratification. Because UFAD is accomplished by supplying air through a raised floor using different types of distribution configurations and outlets, the key issue for efficient performance of the system is to ensure thermal stratification. The inefficient operation of the UFAD system virtually deteriorated the potential savings presumed from such a system. Also, the investigation of energy saving has shown that this amount varies for buildings located in different climates, suggesting further studies should investigate this factor prior to designing a suitable HVAC system.

== Applications ==
Underfloor air distribution is frequently used in office buildings, particularly highly-reconfigurable and open plan offices where raised floors are desirable for cable management. UFAD is also common in command centers, IT data centers and Server rooms that have large cooling loads from electronic equipment and requirements for routing power and data cables. The ASHRAE Underfloor Air Distribution Design Guide suggests that any building considering a raised floor for cable distribution should consider UFAD.

Specific space considerations should be taken when using UFAD systems in laboratories because of its critical room pressurization requirements and potential migration of chemicals into the access floor plenum due to spillage. UFAD systems are not recommended in some specific facilities or spaces, such as small non-residential buildings, wet spaces like restrooms and pool areas, kitchens and dining areas and gymnasiums, because UFAD may result in especially difficult or costly in design. UFAD systems may also be used with other HVAC systems, like displacement ventilation, overhead air distribution systems, radiant ceiling or chilled beam systems to get better performance.

== UFAD compared to other distribution systems ==
=== Overhead (mixing) ===
Conventional overhead mixing systems usually locate both the supply and return air ducts at the ceiling level. Supply air is supplied at velocities higher than typically acceptable for human comfort and the air temperature may be lower, higher, or the same as desired room temperature depending on the cooling/heating load. High-speed turbulent air jets incoming supply air mix with the room air.

A well-engineered UFAD systems have several potential advantages over traditional overhead systems, such as layout flexibility, improved thermal comfort, improved ventilation efficiency and indoor air quality, improved energy efficiency in suitable climates and reduced life cycle costs.

=== Displacement ventilation ===
Displacement Ventilation systems (DV) work on similar principals as UFAD systems. DV systems deliver cool air into the conditioned space at or near the floor level and return air at the ceiling level. This works by utilizing the natural buoyancy of warm air and the thermal plumes generated by heat sources as cooler air is delivered from lower elevations. While similar, UFAD tends to encourage more mixing within the occupied zone and provide local air supply, which enables it to increase air motion in the space and prevent the sensation of stagnant air conditions, often associated with poor air quality. The major practical differences are that in UFAD, air is supplied at a higher velocity through smaller-size supply outlets than in DV, and the supply outlets are usually controlled by the occupants.

== List of notable buildings using UFAD systems ==
Structure	Year	Country	City	Architects	Coordinates
Bank of America Tower	2009	NY	New York City	Cook+Fox Architects	40°45′20.6″N 73°59′2.81″W
David Brower Center	2009	CA	Berkeley	Solomon E.T.C.-WRT	37°52′10.97″N 122°15′58.53″W
San Francisco Federal Building	2007	CA	San Francisco	Morphosis	37°46′47.09″N 122°24′44.13″W
Internal Revenue Service	2007	MO	Kansas City	BNIM	39°5′11.30″N 94°35′2.35″W
The New York Times Building	2007	NY	New York	Renzo Piano Building Workshop	40°45′23.42″N 73°59′25.15″W
Caltrans District 7 HQ	2005	CA	Los Angeles	Thom Mayne	34°3′21.75″N 118°14′40.47″W
CalPERS HQ	2005	CA	Sacramento	Pickard Chilton Architects	38°34′33.51″N 121°30′17.65″W
Foundry Square	2005	CA	San Francisco	Studios Architecture et al.	37°47′24.54″N 122°23′49.02″W
Robert E. Coyle United States Courthouse	2005	CA	Fresno	Moore Ruble Yudell, Gruen Associates	36.7377°N 119.7838°W
Visteon HQ	2004	MI	Van Buren Township	SmithGroupJJR	42°14′39.61″N 83°25′58.53″W
Ray and Maria Stata Center	2003	MA	Boston	Frank Gehry	42°21′43.35″N 71°5′23.26″W
Hewlett Foundation	2002	CA	Menlo Park	B.H. Bocook, Architects, Inc	37°25′30.87″N 122°11′38.04″W
Bellagio Show Palace	1998	NV	Paradise	Will Bruder	36°6′45.10″N 115°10′33.41″W
Phoenix Public Library	1995	AZ	Phoenix	Will Bruder	33°28′17.71″N 112°4′23.84″W
Apple Store	1993	CA	San Francisco	Bohlin Cywinski Jackson	37°47′10.16″N 122°24′22.57″W
Taco Bell Headquarters	2009	CA	Irvine	LPA Architects	33.6571981°N 117.7469452°W
Pearl River Tower	2011	China	Guangzhou	SOM and AS+GG	23°7′36.3″N 113°19′3.36″E
Manitoba Hydro Tower	2009	Canada	Winnipeg, MB	Kuwabara Payne McKenna Blumberg	49°53′33.99″N 97°8′46.70″W
Vancouver Public Library	1995	Canada	Vancouver, BC	Moshe Safdie & DA architects	49°16′44.72″N 123°6′57.68″W
Salesforce Tower	2017	CA	San Francisco	Pelli Clarke Pelli Architects	37°47′23.64″N 122°23′48.84″W
