= Plenum space =

Part of a building hosting air circulation for heating and air conditioning systems

Vertical section through a commercial building using HVAC plenum instead of airspace plenum. When both the supply and return ducts are constructed in this manner, it is possible to insulate the ducts and the dropped ceiling so that the upper airspace is not heated or cooled, increasing energy efficiency. This is a fully enclosed plenum.

A commercial building with a plenum airspace.

A non-fully insulated HVAC plenum created by accident can go unnoticed and become a fire hazard due to cabling installed under the assumption that this will always be a fully enclosed plenum. In the event of a fire, this can expose non-fire resistant building materials to heat.

A plenum space is a part of a building that can facilitate air circulation for heating and air conditioning systems, by providing pathways for either heated/conditioned or return airflows, usually at greater than atmospheric pressure. Space between the structural ceiling and the dropped ceiling or under a raised floor is typically considered plenum; however, some drop-ceiling designs create a tight seal that does not allow for airflow and therefore may not be considered a plenum air-handling space.

== Maintenance ==
Diligence is required to make sure that a non-plenum airspace stays that way. A non-plenum airspace can become a plenum airspace by accident if the ductwork is disconnected and not properly repaired and resealed. Ductwork disconnection can occur due to building damage such as earthquakes, aging, or adverse environment causing the metal to corrode and fall apart, or simply negligence on the part of building contractors that leave work unfinished. In all such cases, discovery, and repair of such problems to eliminate unintended plenums is difficult due to the hidden nature, limited space, and difficult access of most installed drop ceilings.

For highest fire safety, it is best to assume all drop-ceiling and raised-floor airspaces are plenums, whether or not they are officially designated as such, and to always use plenum cable in these spaces.
