= Clerestory =

Windows in wall above eye level

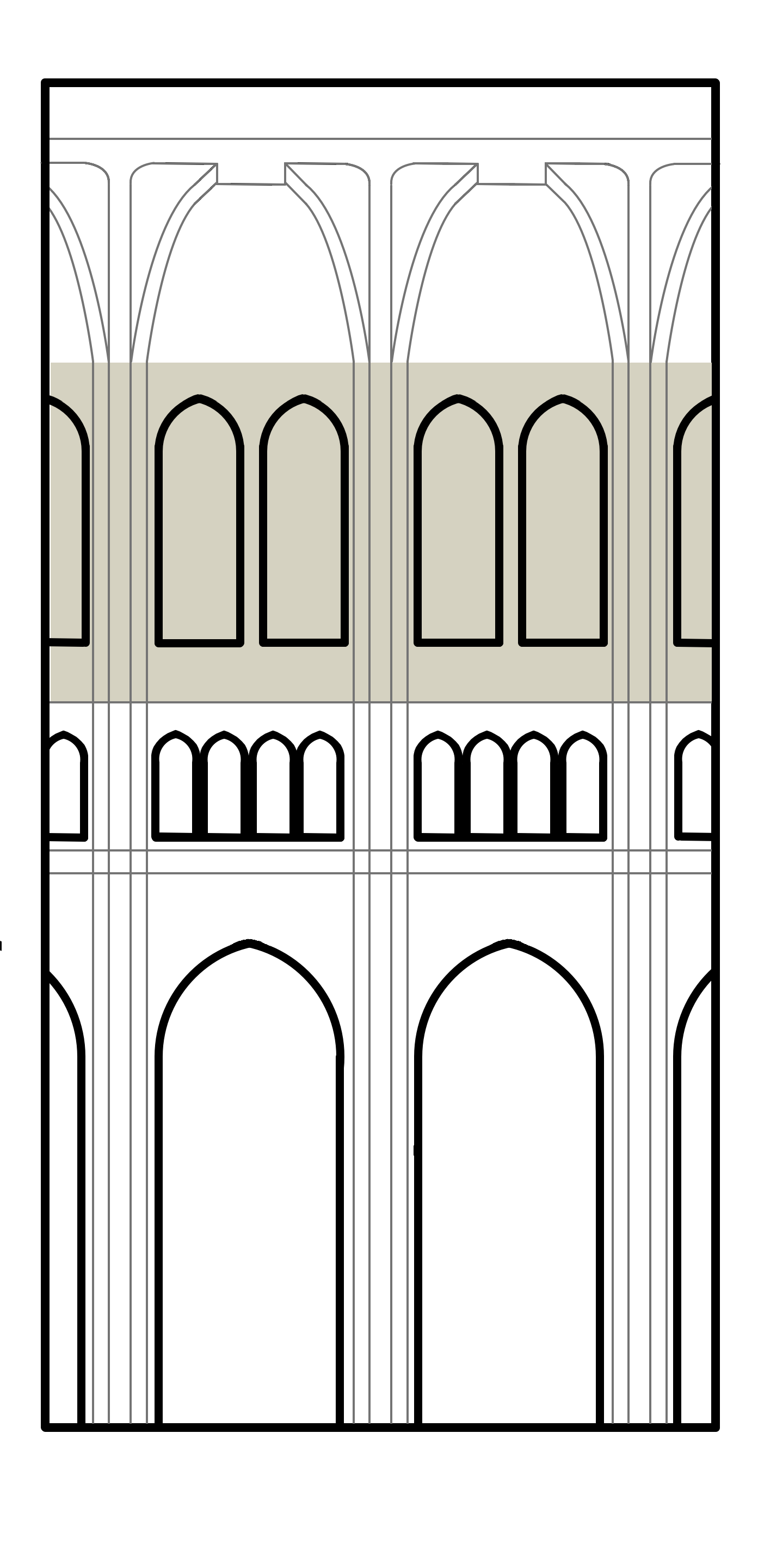
Interior elevation of a Gothic cathedral, with clerestory highlighted

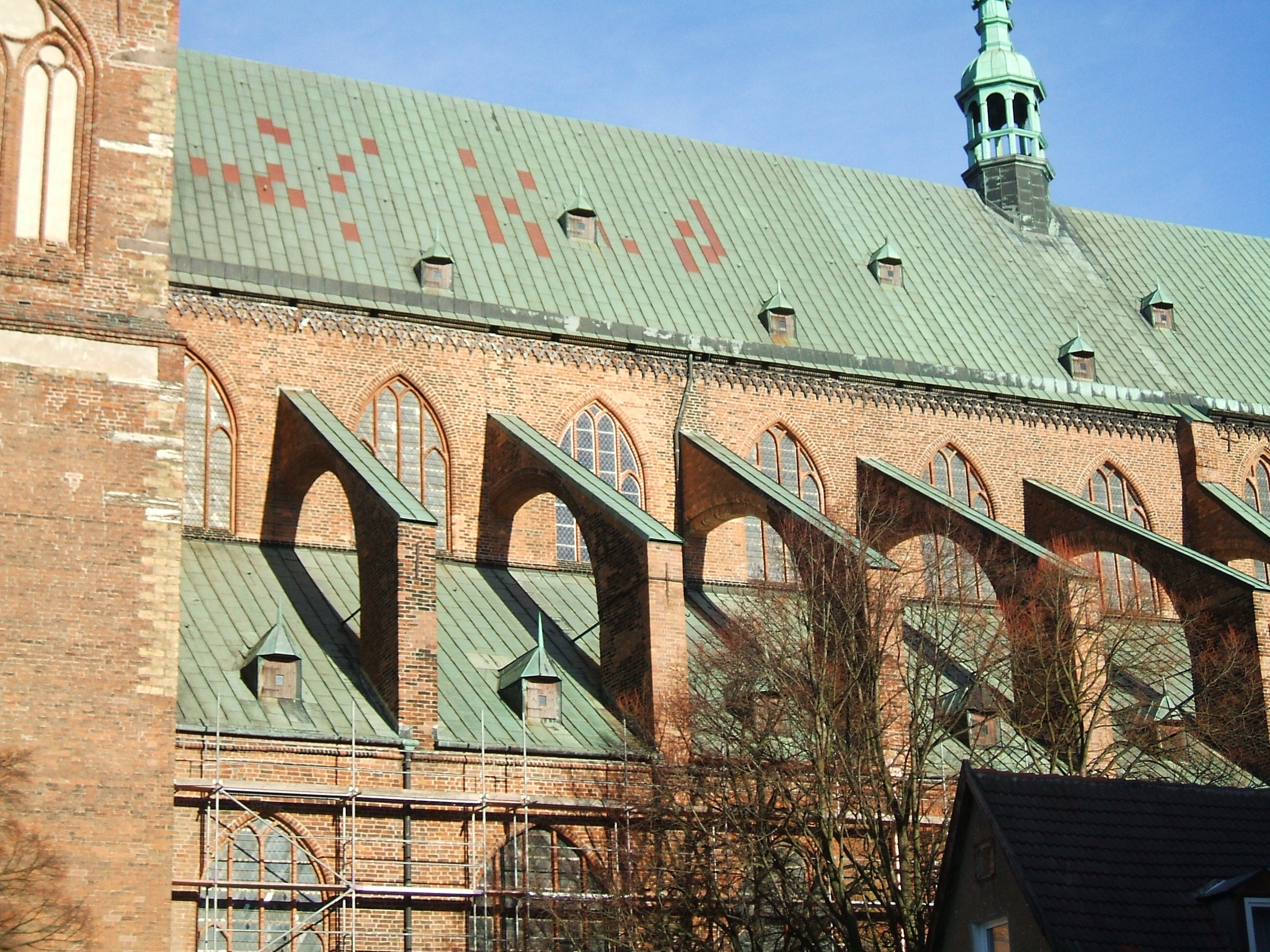
The church of St Nicholas, Stralsund in Germany – the clerestory is the level between the two green roofs, reinforced here by flying buttresses

A clerestory (/ˈklɪərstɔːri/ KLEER-stor-ee; lit. 'clear storey', also clearstory, clearstorey, or overstorey; from Old French: cler estor) is a high section of wall that contains windows above eye level. Its purpose is to admit light, fresh air, or both.

Historically, a clerestory formed an upper level of a Roman basilica or of the nave of a Romanesque or Gothic church, the walls of which rise above the rooflines of the lower aisles and are pierced with windows.

In addition to architecture, clerestories have been used in transportation vehicles such as buses and trains to provide additional lighting, ventilation, or headroom.

== History ==
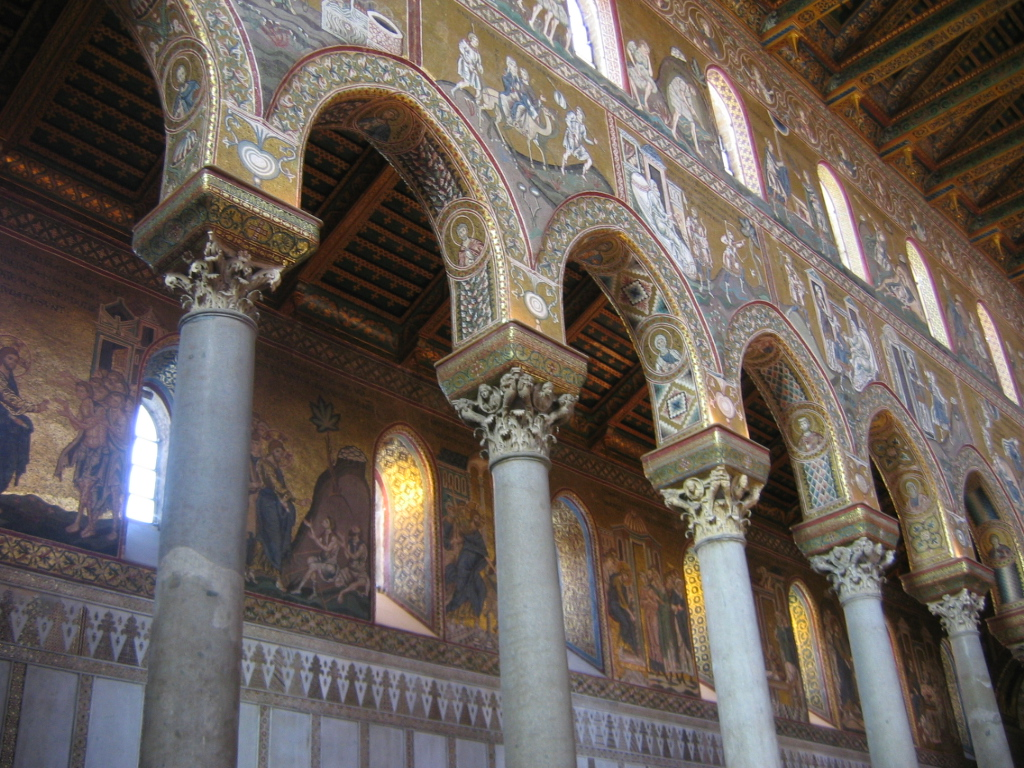
The walls of the clerestory of the basilica-shaped Cathedral of Monreale, Italy, covered with mosaics

=== Ancient world ===
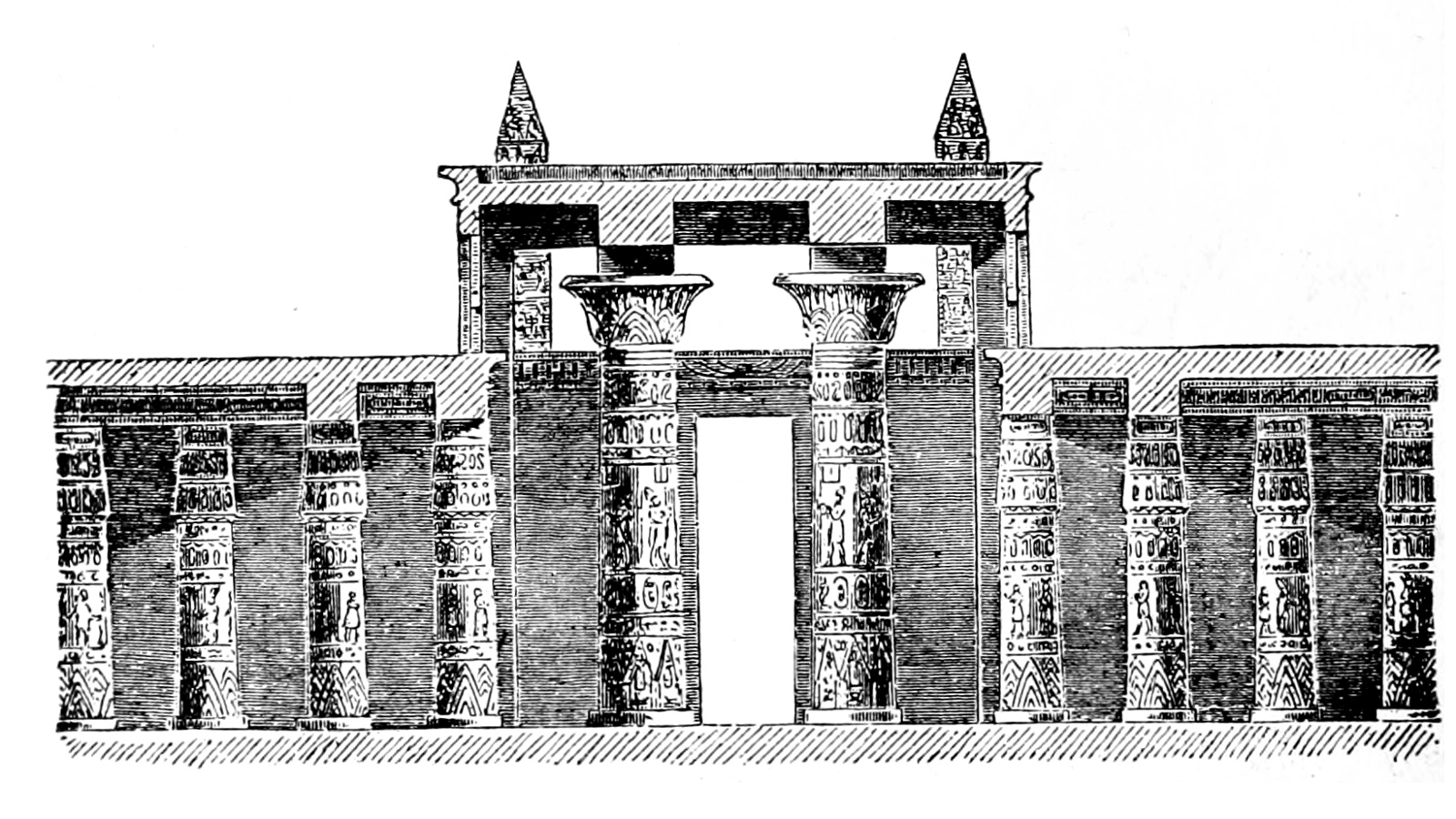
Front-view profile of Great Hypostyle Hall, an early example of a clerestory.

Clerestories appear to originate in Egyptian temples, such as the Great Hypostyle Hall, where the lighting of the hall of columns was obtained over the stone roofs of the adjoining aisles, through gaps left in the vertical slabs of stone. They appeared in Egypt at least as early as the Amarna Period. Minoan palaces in Crete such as Knossos employed lightwells in addition to clerestories.

According to the Hebrew Bible, Solomon's Temple featured clerestory windows made possible by the use of a tall, angled roof and a central ridgepole.

The clerestory was used in the Hellenistic architecture of classical antiquity. The Romans applied clerestories to basilicas of justice and to the basilica-like thermae and palaces.

=== Early Christian and Byzantine basilicas ===
Early Christian churches and some Byzantine churches, particularly in Italy, are based closely on the Roman basilica, and maintained the form of a central nave flanked by lower aisles on each side. The nave and aisles are separated by columns or piers, above which rises a wall pierced by clerestory windows.

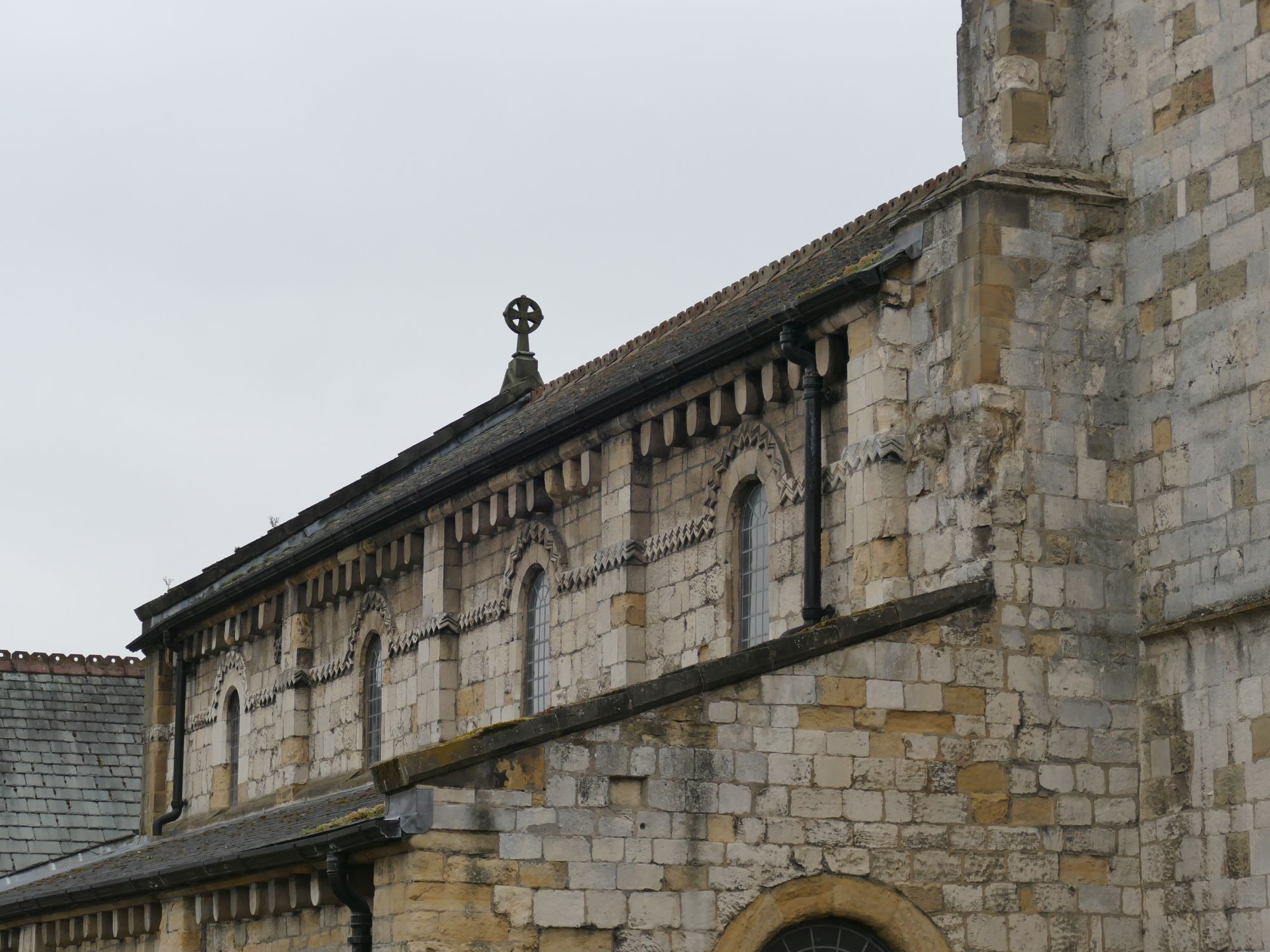
A Romanesque clerestory at St Michael's Church, Malton

=== Romanesque period ===
During the Romanesque period, many churches of the basilica form were constructed all over Europe. Many of these churches have wooden roofs with clerestories below them. Some Romanesque churches have barrel-vaulted ceilings with no clerestory. The development of the groin vault and ribbed vault made possible the insertion of clerestory windows.

Initially, the nave of a large aisled and clerestoried church was of two levels: arcade and clerestory. During the Romanesque period, a third level was inserted between them, a gallery called the triforium or tribune. The triforium generally opens into space beneath the sloping roof of the aisle. This became a standard feature of later Romanesque and Gothic large abbey and cathedral churches. Sometimes another gallery set into the wall space above the triforium and below the clerestory. This feature is found in some late Romanesque and early Gothic buildings in France. Conversely, many major churches in southern France and Spain, such as Santiago de Compostela Cathedral, omitted the clerestory entirely, having just the arcade and tribune levels.

The oldest glass clerestory windows still in place are from the late eleventh century and are found in Augsburg Cathedral in Bavaria, Germany.

=== Gothic period ===
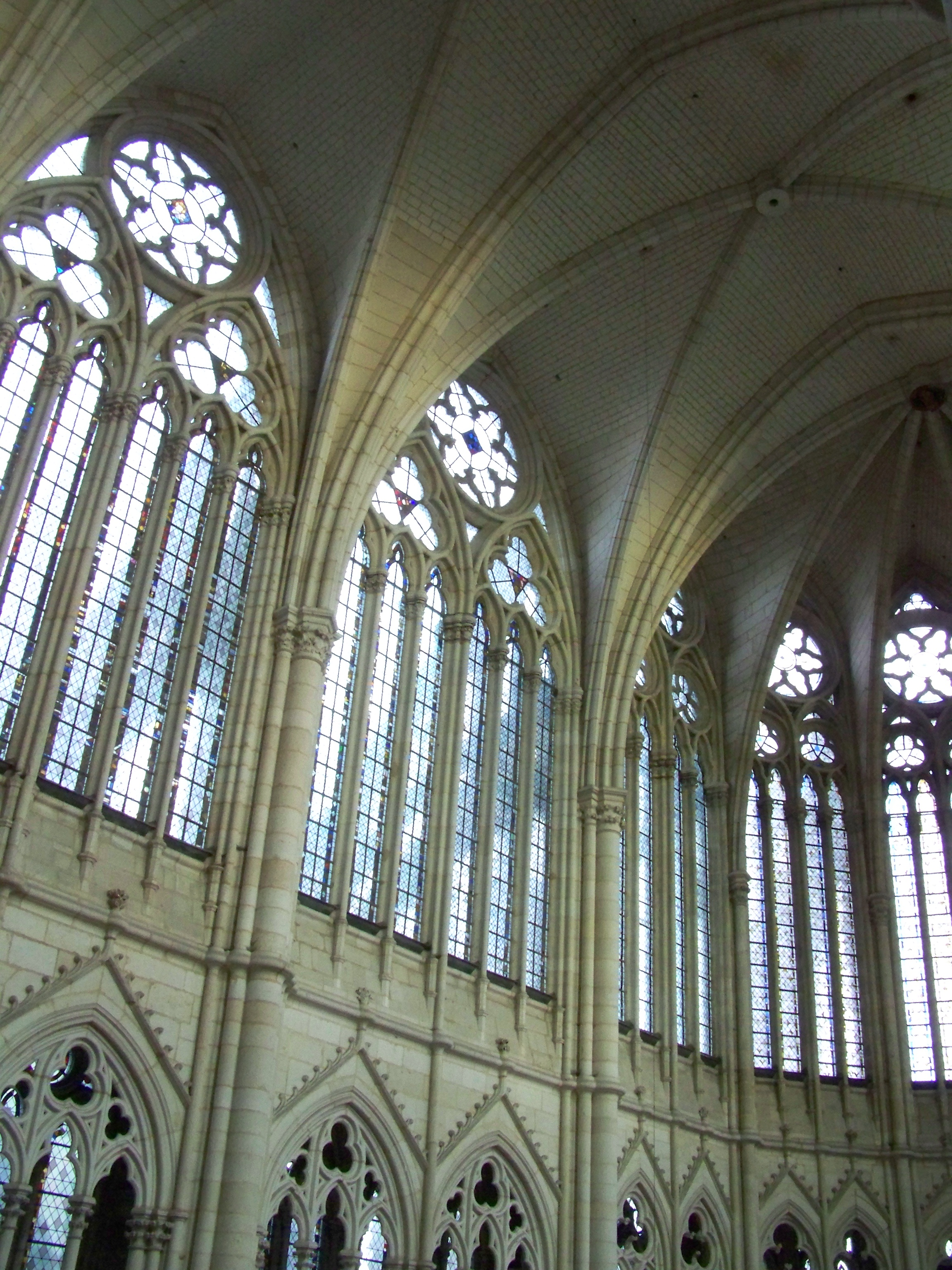
The clerestory of Amiens Cathedral in northern France

In smaller churches, clerestory windows may be trefoils or quatrefoils. In some Italian churches they are ocular. In most large churches, they are an important feature, both for beauty and for utility. The ribbed vaulting and flying buttresses of Gothic architecture concentrated the weight and thrust of the roof, freeing wall-space for larger clerestory fenestration. Generally, in Gothic masterpieces, the clerestory is divided into bays by the vaulting shafts that continue the same tall columns that form the arcade separating the aisles from the nave.

The tendency was for the clerestory level to become progressively taller and the size of the windows to get proportionally larger in relation to wall surface, emerging in works such as the Gothic architecture of Amiens Cathedral or Westminster Abbey, whose clerestories account for nearly a third of the height of the interior.

== Modern use ==
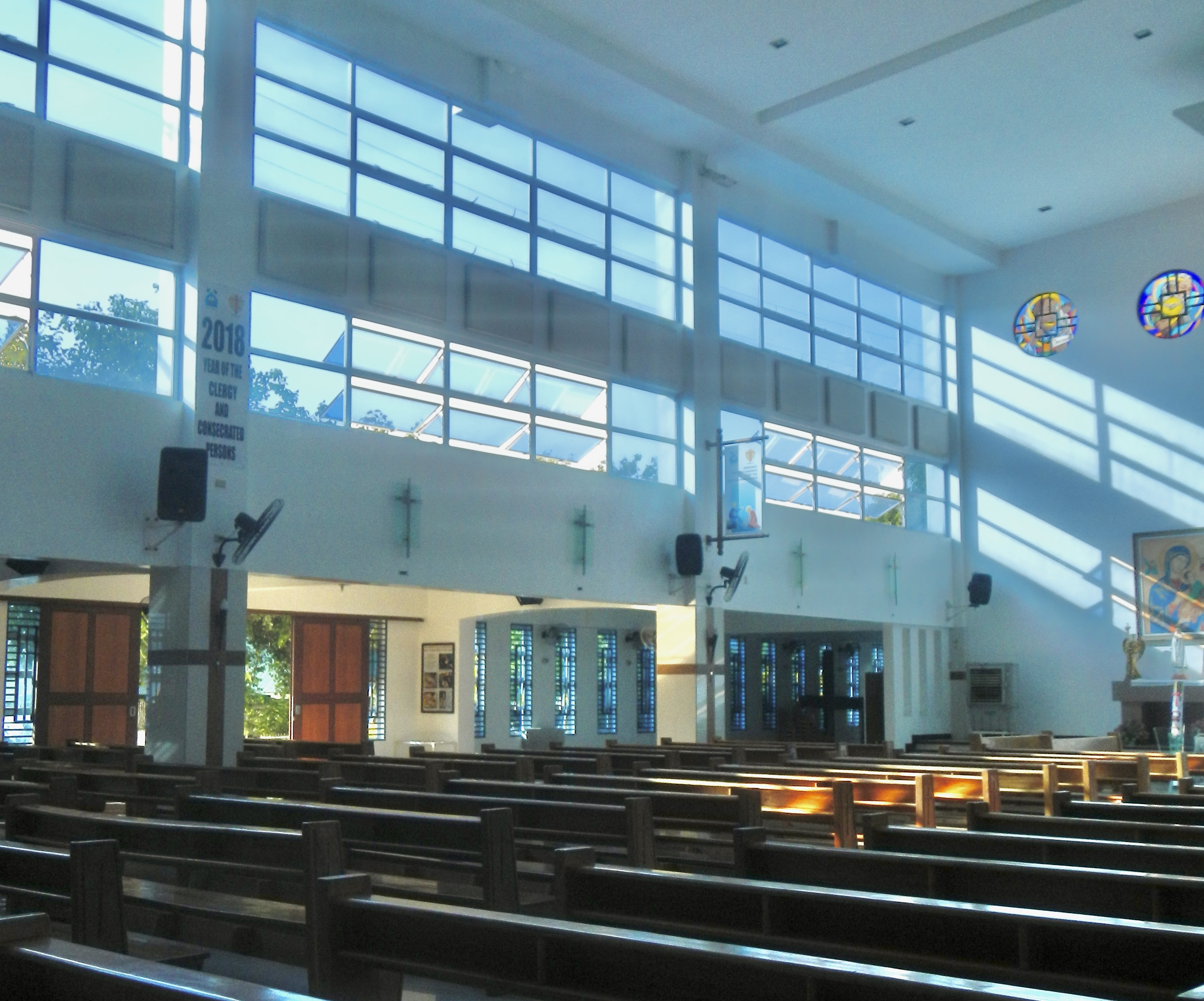
Modern clerestories of Holy Trinity Parish Church in Cainta, Rizal, Philippines

Direct gain solar heating through a clerestory

Modern clerestories often are defined as vertical windows, located on high walls, extending up from the roofline, designed to allow light and breezes into a space, without compromising privacy. Factory buildings often are built with clerestory windows; modern housing designs sometimes include them as well.

Modern clerestory windows may have another especially important role besides daylighting and ventilation: they can be part of passive solar strategies, in very energy-efficient buildings (passive houses and zero-energy buildings).

To that end, clerestories are used in conjunction with stone, brick, concrete, and other high-mass walls and floors, properly positioned to store solar heat gains during the hotter parts of the day – allowing the walls and the floor to act as a heat bank during the cooler parts of the day.

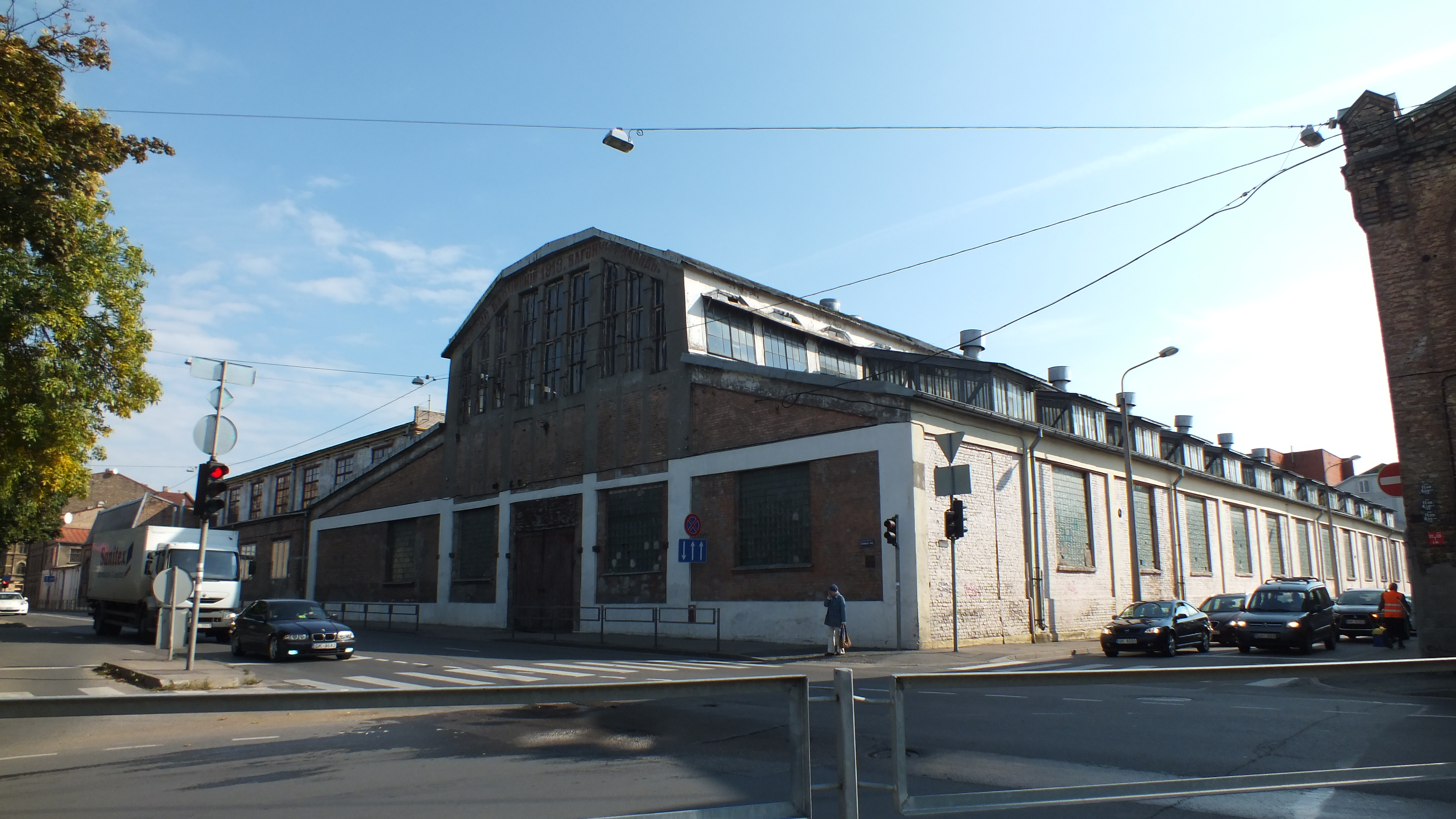
Russo-Balt factory building with clerestory in Riga, Latvia

Clerestories – in passive solar strategies – should be properly located (typically in the sunny side of the building) and protected from the summer's sun by rooflines, overhangs, recessed thick walls, or other architectural elements, in order to prevent overheating during the cooling season.

== In transportation ==
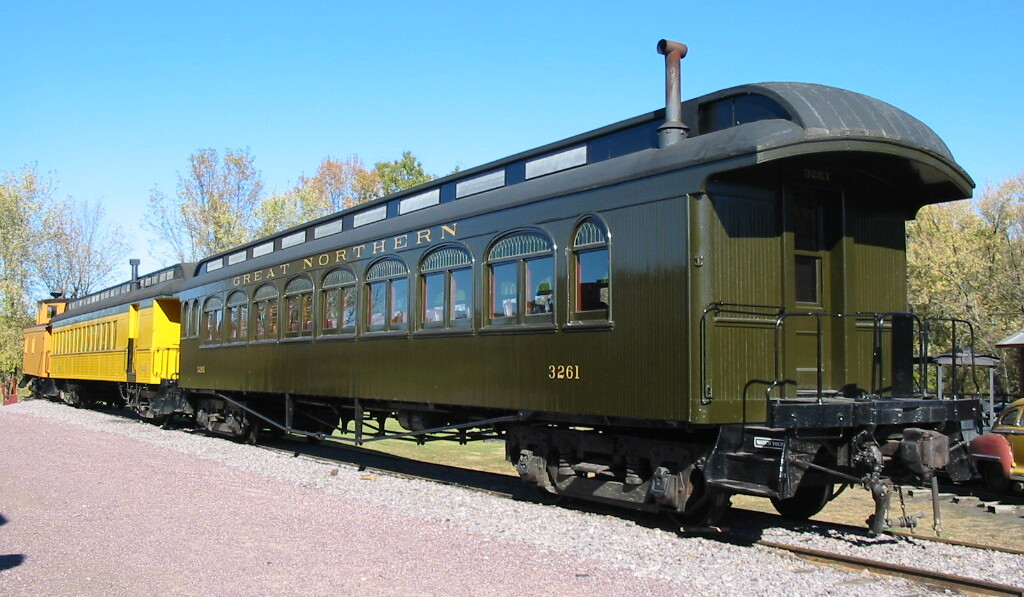
Barney and Smith Car Company clerestory-roofed passenger cars at the Mid-Continent Railway Museum. As in these examples, later clerestory roofs ended in a bullnose.

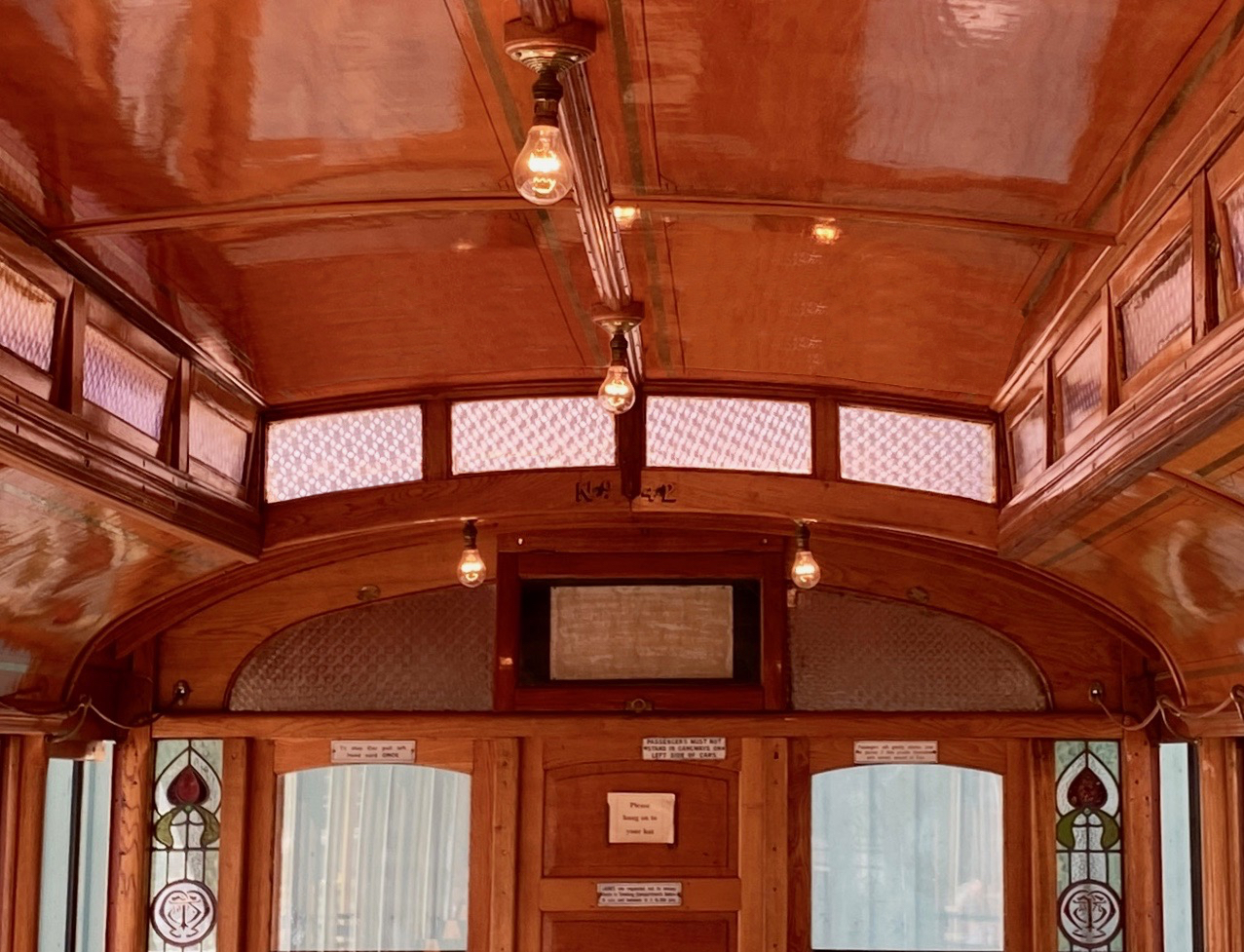
Interior of the clerestory roof of a 1908-vintage tram at the Tramway Museum, St Kilda, South Australia, showing how it provides improved light and ventilation.

Clerestory roofs were incorporated into the designs of many railway passenger cars and trams from the 1860s to the 1930s. They increased the daylight and ventilation available to passengers. In the US, the railroad clerestory roof was also known as the "lantern roof".

The first Pullman coaches in the UK had clerestory roofs. They were imported from the US and assembled at Derby, where Pullman set up an assembly plant in conjunction with the Midland Railway, a predecessor of the London Midland and Scottish Railway (LMS). The first coach, a sleeping car named "Midland", was assembled and ready for trial-running in January 1874.

In the UK, when coaches were equipped with gas lighting, a clerestory was normally incorporated to improve ventilation near the lamps, in order to improve combustion and reduce the risk of carbon monoxide poisoning. The last clerestory-roofed trains on the London Underground were the 'Q' stock, which were withdrawn from operation in 1971.

Clerestories were also used in early British double-decker buses, giving better ventilation and headroom in the centre corridor, as well as better illumination.

The Volkswagen Type 2 Kombi, or Transport, commonly called the Microbus, came in a deluxe version with clerestory windows. Volkswagen made the Samba from 1961 to 1967 in several versions, which had as many as 23 windows, and it is highly prized by collectors.

In the UK, the style is also known as "mollycroft roof", especially in Romany caravans, such as vardos, and other caravans.

== See also ==
- Architecture of cathedrals and great churches
- Gothic architecture
- Passive daylighting
- Romanesque architecture
- Roof window
- Säteritak, a Swedish roof style with a strip of clerestory-type of windows halfway up a hip roof
