= Cooling load =

Rate of air temperature movement

Cooling load is the rate at which sensible and latent heat must be removed from the space to maintain a constant space dry-bulb air temperature and humidity. Sensible heat into the space causes its air temperature to rise while latent heat is associated with the rise of the moisture content in the space. The building design, internal equipment, occupants, and outdoor weather conditions may affect the cooling load in a building using different heat transfer mechanisms. The SI units are watts.

== Overview ==
The cooling load is calculated to select HVAC equipment that has the appropriate cooling capacity to remove heat from the zone. A zone is typically defined as an area with similar heat gains, similar temperature and humidity control requirements, or an enclosed space within a building with the purpose to monitor and control the zone's temperature and humidity with a single sensor e.g. thermostat. Cooling load calculation methodologies take into account heat transfer by conduction, convection, and radiation. Methodologies include heat balance, radiant time series, cooling load temperature difference, transfer function, and sol-air temperature. Methods calculate the cooling load in either steady state or dynamic conditions and some can be more involved than others. These methodologies and others can be found in ASHRAE handbooks, ISO Standard 11855, European Standard (EN) 15243, and EN 15255. ASHRAE recommends the heat balance method and radiant time series methods.

== Differentiation from heat gains ==
The cooling load of a building should not be confused with its heat gains. Heat gains refer to the rate at which heat is transferred into or generated inside a building. Just like cooling loads, heat gains can be separated into sensible and latent heat gains that can occur through conduction, convection, and radiation. Thermophysical properties of walls, floors, ceilings, and windows, lighting power density (LPD), plug load density, occupant density, and equipment efficiency play an important role in determining the magnitude of heat gains in a building. ASHRAE handbook of fundamentals refers to the following six modes of entry for heat gains:

1. Solar radiation through transparent surfaces
2. Heat conduction through exterior walls and roofs
3. Heat conduction through ceilings, floors, and interior partitions
4. Heat generated in the space by occupants, lights, and appliances
5. Energy transfer through direct-with-space ventilation and infiltration of outdoor air
6. Miscellaneous heats gains

Furthermore, heat extraction rate is the rate at which heat is actually being removed from the space by the cooling equipment. Heat gains, heat extraction rate, and cooling loads values are often not equal due to thermal inertia effects. Heat is stored in the mass of the building and furnishings delaying the time at which it can become a heat gain and be extracted by the cooling equipment to maintain the desired indoor conditions. Another reason is that the inability of the cooling system to keep dry bulb temperature and humidity constant.

== Cooling loads in air systems ==
In air systems, convective heat gains are assumed to become a cooling load instantly. Radiative heat gains are absorbed by walls, floors, ceilings, and furnishings causing an increase in their temperature which will then transfer heat to the space's air by convection. Conductive heat gains are converted to convective and radiative heat gains. If the space's air temperature and humidity are kept constant then heat extraction rate and space cooling load are equal. The resulting cooling load through different air system types in the same built environment can be different.

== Cooling loads in radiant systems ==
In radiant systems, not all convective heat gains become a cooling load instantly because radiant system has limitations on how much heat can be removed from the zone through convection. Radiative heat gains are absorbed by active and non-active cooling surfaces. If absorbed by active surfaces then heat gains become an instant cooling load otherwise a temperature increase will occur in the non-active surface that will eventually cause heat transfer to the space by convection and radiation.
