= Solar gain =

Solar energy effect

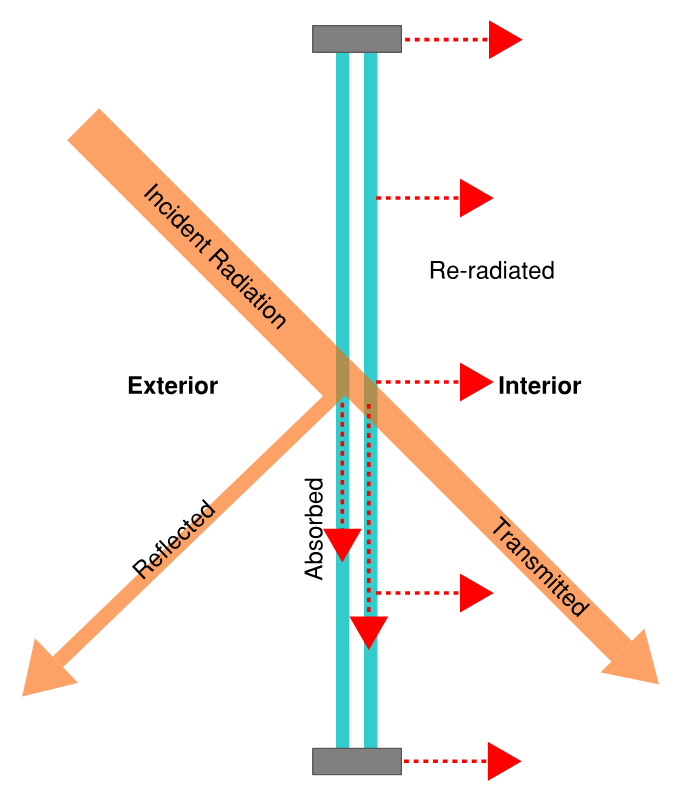
Solar gain through windows includes energy transmitted directly through the glass and energy absorbed by the glass and frame and then re-radiated into the space.

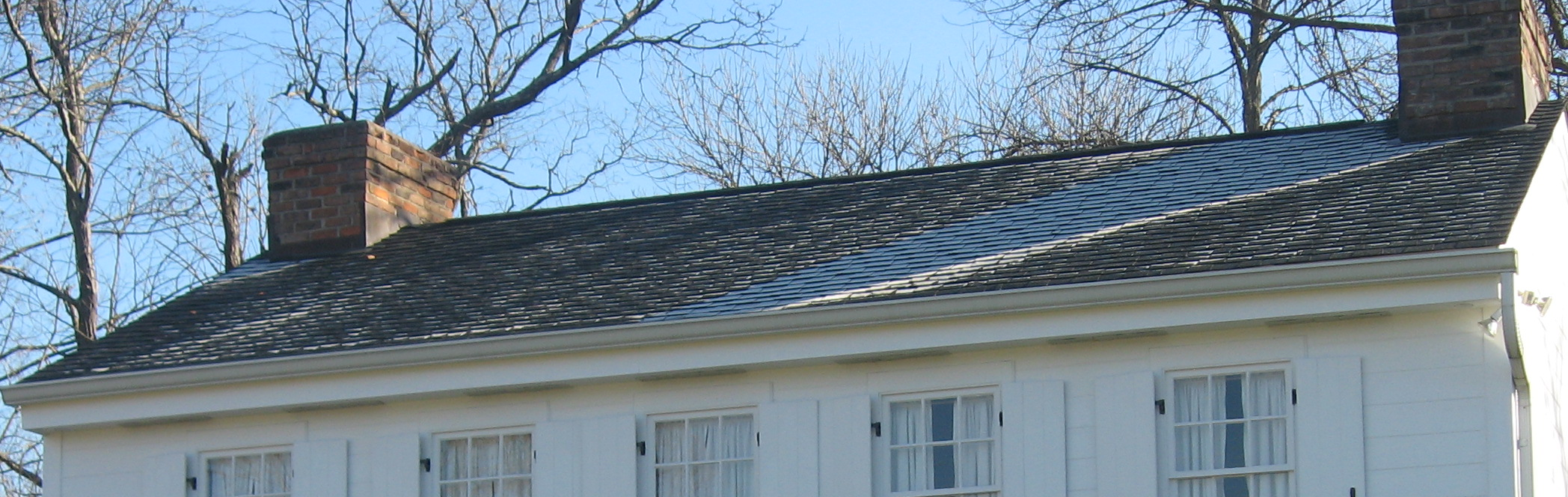
Solar gain is illustrated by the snow on the roof of this house: sunlight has melted all of the snow, except for the area that is shaded by the chimney to the right.

Solar gain (also known as solar heat gain or passive solar gain) is the increase in thermal energy of a space, object or structure as it absorbs incident solar radiation. The amount of solar gain a space experiences is a function of the total incident solar irradiance and of the ability of any intervening material to transmit or resist the radiation.

Objects struck by sunlight absorb its visible and short-wave infrared components, increase in temperature, and then re-radiate that heat at longer infrared wavelengths. Though transparent building materials such as glass allow visible light to pass through almost unimpeded, once that light is converted to long-wave infrared radiation by materials indoors, it is unable to escape back through the window since glass is opaque to those longer wavelengths. The trapped heat thus causes solar gain via a phenomenon known as the greenhouse effect. In buildings, excessive solar gain can lead to overheating within a space, but it can also be used as a passive heating strategy when heat is desired.

== Window solar gain properties ==
Solar gain is most frequently addressed in the design and selection of windows and doors. Because of this, the most common metrics for quantifying solar gain are used as a standard way of reporting the thermal properties of window assemblies. In the United States, The American Society of Heating, Refrigerating, and Air-Conditioning Engineers (ASHRAE), and The National Fenestration Rating Council (NFRC) maintain standards for the calculation and measurement of these values.

=== Shading coefficient ===
The shading coefficient (SC) is a measure of the radiative thermal performance of a glass unit (panel or window) in a building. It is defined as the ratio of solar radiation at a given wavelength and angle of incidence passing through a glass unit to the radiation that would pass through a reference window of frameless 3 millimetres (0.12 in) Clear Float Glass. Since the quantities compared are functions of both wavelength and angle of incidence, the shading coefficient for a window assembly is typically reported for a single wavelength typical of solar radiation entering normal to the plane of glass. This quantity includes both energy that is transmitted directly through the glass as well as energy that is absorbed by the glass and frame and re-radiated into the space, and is given by the following equation:

$F(\lambda,\theta)=T(\lambda,\theta)+N*A(\lambda,\theta)$

Here, λ is the wavelength of radiation and θ is the angle of incidence. "T" is the transmissivity of the glass, "A" is its absorptivity, and "N" is the fraction of absorbed energy that is re-emitted into the space. The overall shading coefficient is thus given by the ratio:

$S.C. = F(\lambda,\theta)_1 / F(\lambda,\theta)_o$

The shading coefficient depends on the radiation properties of the window assembly. These properties are the transmissivity "T" , absorptivity "A", emissivity (which is equal to the absorptivity for any given wavelength), and reflectivity all of which are dimensionless quantities that together sum to 1. Factors such as color, tint, and reflective coatings affect these properties, which is what prompted the development of the shading coefficient as a correction factor to account for this. ASHRAE's table of solar heat gain factors provides the expected solar heat gain for 1/8 in (3.2 mm) clear float glass at different latitudes, orientations, and times, which can be multiplied by the shading coefficient to correct for differences in radiation properties. The value of the shading coefficient ranges from 0 to 1. The lower the rating, the less solar heat is transmitted through the glass, and the greater its shading ability.

In addition to glass properties, shading devices integrated into the window assembly are also included in the SC calculation. Such devices can reduce the shading coefficient by blocking portions of the glazing with opaque or translucent material, thus reducing the overall transmissivity.

Window design methods have moved away from the Shading Coefficient and towards the Solar Heat Gain Coefficient (SHGC), which is defined as the fraction of incident solar radiation that actually enters a building through the entire window assembly as heat gain (not just the glass portion). The standard method for calculating the SHGC also uses a more realistic wavelength-by-wavelength method, rather than just providing a coefficient for a single wavelength like the shading coefficient does. Though the shading coefficient is still mentioned in manufacturer product literature and some industry computer software, it is no longer mentioned as an option in industry-specific texts or model building codes. Aside from its inherent inaccuracies, another shortcoming of the SC is its counter-intuitive name, which suggests that high values equal high shading when in reality the opposite is true. Industry technical experts recognized the limitations of SC and pushed towards SHGC in the United States (and the analogous g-value in Europe) before the early 1990s.

A conversion from SC to SHGC is not necessarily straightforward, as they each take into account different heat transfer mechanisms and paths (window assembly vs. glass-only). To perform an approximate conversion from SC to SHGC, multiply the SC value by 0.87.

=== g-value ===
The g-value (sometimes also called a Solar Factor or Total Solar Energy Transmittance) is the coefficient commonly used in Europe to measure the solar energy transmittance of windows. Despite having minor differences in modeling standards compared to the SHGC, the two values are effectively the same. A g-value of 1.0 represents full transmittance of all solar radiation while 0.0 represents a window with no solar energy transmittance. In practice though, most g-values will range between 0.2 and 0.7, with solar control glazing having a g-value of less than 0.5.

=== Solar heat gain coefficient (SHGC) ===
SHGC is the successor to the shading coefficient used in the United States and it is the ratio of transmitted solar radiation to incident solar radiation of an entire window assembly. It ranges from 0 to 1 and refers to the solar energy transmittance of a window or door as a whole, factoring in the glass, frame material, sash (if present), divided lite bars (if present) and screens (if present). The transmittance of each component is calculated in a similar manner to the shading coefficient. However, in contrast to the shading coefficient, the total solar gain is calculated on a wavelength-by-wavelength basis where the directly transmitted portion of the solar heat gain coefficient is given by:

$T = \int\limits_{350 \ nm}^{3500 \ nm} T(\lambda) E(\lambda) d\lambda$

Here $T(\lambda)$ is the spectral transmittance at a given wavelength in nanometers and $E(\lambda)$ is the incident solar spectral irradiance. When integrated over the wavelengths of solar short-wave radiation, it yields the total fraction of transmitted solar energy across all solar wavelengths. The product $N*A(\lambda,\theta)$ is thus the portion of absorbed and re-emitted energy across all assembly components beyond just the glass. The standard SHGC is calculated only for an angle of incidence normal to the window. However this tends to provide a good estimate over a wide range of angles, up to 30 degrees from normal in most cases.

SHGC can either be estimated through simulation models or measured by recording the total heat flow through a window with a calorimeter chamber. In both cases, NFRC standards outline the procedure for the test procedure and calculation of the SHGC. For dynamic fenestration or operable shading, each possible state can be described by a different SHGC.

Though the SHGC is more realistic than the SC, both are only rough approximations when they include complex elements such as shading devices, which offer more precise control over when fenestration is shaded from solar gain than glass treatments.

== Solar gain in opaque building components ==
Apart from windows, walls and roofs also serve as pathways for solar gain. In these components heat transfer is entirely due to absorptance, conduction, and re-radiation since all transmittance is blocked in opaque materials. The primary metric in opaque components is the Solar Reflectance Index which accounts for both solar reflectance (albedo) and emittance of a surface. Materials with high SRI will reflect and emit a majority of heat energy, keeping them cooler than other exterior finishes. This is quite significant in the design of roofs since dark roofing materials can often be as much as 50 °C hotter than the surrounding air temperature, leading to large thermal stresses as well as heat transfer to interior space.

== Solar gain and building design ==
Solar gain can have either positive or negative effects depending on the climate. In the context of passive solar building design, the aim of the designer is normally to maximize solar gain within the building in the winter (to reduce space heating demand), and to control it in summer (to minimize cooling requirements). Thermal mass may be used to even out the fluctuations during the day, and to some extent between days.

=== Control of solar gain ===
Uncontrolled solar gain is undesirable in hot climates due to its potential for overheating a space. To minimize this and reduce cooling loads, several technologies exist for solar gain reduction. SHGC is influenced by the color or tint of glass and its degree of reflectivity. Reflectivity can be modified through the application of reflective metal oxides to the surface of the glass. Low-emissivity coating is another more recently developed option that offers greater specificity in the wavelengths reflected and re-emitted. This allows glass to block mainly short-wave infrared radiation without greatly reducing visible transmittance.

In climate-responsive design for cold and mixed climates, windows are typically sized and positioned in order to provide solar heat gains during the heating season. To that end, glazing with a relatively high solar heat gain coefficient is often used so as not to block solar heat gains, especially in the sunny side of the house. SHGC also decreases with the number of glass panes used in a window. For example, in triple glazed windows, SHGC tends to be in the range of 0.33 - 0.47. For double glazed windows SHGC is more often in the range of 0.42 - 0.55.

Different types of glass can be used to increase or to decrease solar heat gain through fenestration, but can also be more finely tuned by the proper orientation of windows and by the addition of shading devices such as overhangs, louvers, fins, porches, and other architectural shading elements.

=== Passive solar heating ===
Passive solar heating is a design strategy that attempts to maximize the amount of solar gain in a building when additional heating is desired. It differs from active solar heating which uses exterior water tanks with pumps to absorb solar energy because passive solar systems do not require energy for pumping and store heat directly in structures and finishes of occupied space.

In direct solar gain systems, the composition and coating of the building glazing can also be manipulated to increase the greenhouse effect by optimizing their radiation properties, while their size, position, and shading can be used to optimize solar gain. Solar gain can also be transferred to the building by indirect or isolated solar gain systems.

Passive solar designs typically employ large equator facing windows with a high SHGC and overhangs that block sunlight in summer months and permit it to enter the window in the winter. When placed in the path of admitted sunlight, high thermal mass features such as concrete slabs or trombe walls store large amounts of solar radiation during the day and release it slowly into the space throughout the night. When designed properly, this can modulate temperature fluctuations. Some of the current research into this subject area is addressing the tradeoff between opaque thermal mass for storage and transparent glazing for collection through the use of transparent phase change materials that both admit light and store energy without the need for excessive weight.

== See also ==
- Double-skin facade
- Heating degree day
- Insulated glazing
- Low-emissivity coatings
