= Säteri roof =

Type of roof in mid-17th century Sweden

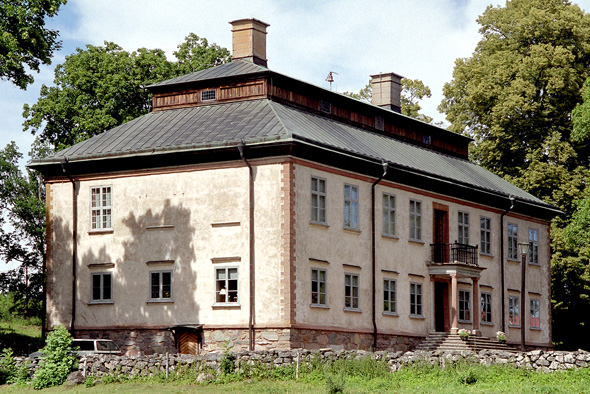
Stola Manor (1719), Strö parish, Västergötland

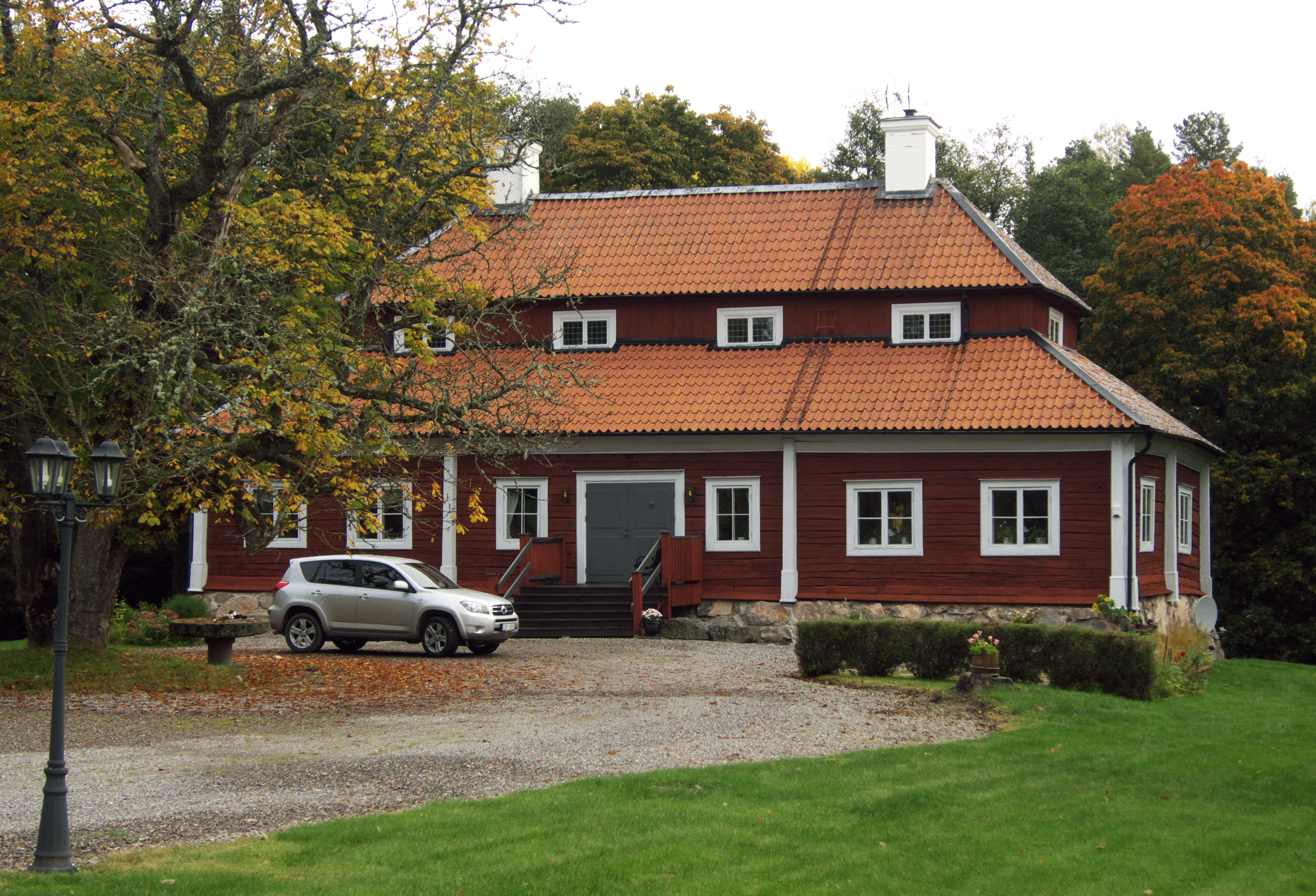
Manor of Vahlsta (c. 1700) in Odensvi parish, Västmanland

A säteritak ("manorial roof") is a type of roof, similar to a clerestory, that enjoyed great popularity in Sweden from the mid-seventeenth century.

== Structure ==
Originally used for higher-status buildings such as manors (hence the name), it consists of a hip roof, where the uppermost part has been cut off from the bottom part by an additional strip of wall and often an additional line of roof windows. It would later spread to rural buildings of more modest social status.

The model for this type of roof was the more elaborate one of Riddarhuset, a palatial building in Stockholm housing the parliamentary meetings of the nobility, which was given its final form by Simon de la Vallée.

== Purpose ==
The upper part, with its additional windows, was often purely decorative, but it could contain an additional floor, as in the modest Manor of Vahlsta in Västmanland (from c. 1700).

== See also ==
- Barrel roof
