= Shading coefficient =

Shading coefficient (SC) is a measure of thermal performance of a glass unit (panel or window) in a building.

It is the ratio of solar gain (due to direct sunlight) passing through a glass unit to the solar energy which passes through 3mm Clear Float Glass. It is an indicator of how well the glass is thermally insulating (shading) the interior when there is direct sunlight on the panel or window.

The shading coefficient depends on the color of glass and degree of reflectivity. It also depends on the type of reflective metal oxides for the case of reflective glass. Sputter-coated reflective and/or sputter-coated low-emissivity glasses tend to have lower SC compared to the same pyrolitically-coated reflective and/or low-emissivity glass.

The value ranges between 1.00 and 0.00, but experiments show that the value of the SC is typically between 0.98 and 0.10. The lower the rating, the less solar heat is transmitted through the glass, and the greater its shading ability.

Solar properties play a significant role in the selection of glass, especially in regions or cardinal directions with high solar exposure. It becomes less significant in situations where direct sunlight is not a major factor (e.g., windows completely shaded by overhangs).

Window design methods have moved away from Shading Coefficient to Solar Heat Gain Coefficient (SHGC), which is defined as the fraction of incident solar radiation that actually enters a building through the entire window assembly as heat gain (not just the glass portion). Though shading coefficient is still mentioned in manufacturer product literature and some industry computer software, it is no longer mentioned as an option in the handbook widely used by building energy engineers or model building codes. Industry technical experts recognized the limitations of SC and pushed towards SHGC before the early 1990s.

A conversion from SC to SHGC is not necessarily straightforward, as they each take into account different heat transfer mechanisms and paths (window assembly vs. glass-only). To perform an approximate conversion from SC to SHGC, multiply the SC value by 0.87.
