= Sol-air temperature =

Variable to calculate cooling load of a building

Sol-air temperature (T_{sol-air}) is a variable used to calculate cooling load of a building and determine the total heat gain through exterior surfaces. It is an improvement over:

$$\frac{q}{A} = h_o(T_o - T_s)$$

Where:

- $q$ = rate of heat transfer [W]
- $A$ = heat transfer surface area [m^{2}]
- $h_o$ = heat transfer coefficient for radiation (long wave) and convection [W/m^{2}K]
- $T_o$ = outdoor surroundings' temperature [°C]
- $T_s$ = outside surface temperature [°C]

The above equation only takes into account the temperature differences and ignores two important parameters, being 1) solar radiative flux; and 2) infrared exchanges from the sky. The concept of T_{sol-air} was thus introduced to enable these parameters to be included within an improved calculation. The following formula results:

$T_\mathrm{sol-air} = T_o + \frac{ (a \cdot I - \Delta Q_{ir})}{h_o}$

Where:

- $a$ = solar radiation absorptivity (surface solar absorptance or the inverse of the solar reflectance of a material) [-]
- $I$ = global solar irradiance (i.e. total solar radiation incident on the surface) [W/m^{2}]
- $\Delta Q_{ir}$ = extra infrared radiation due to difference between the external air temperature and the apparent sky temperature. This can be written as $\Delta Q_{ir} = F_r * h_r * \Delta T_{o-sky}$ [W/m^{2}]

The product $T_\mathrm{sol-air}$ just found can now be used to calculate the amount of heat transfer per unit area, as below:

$\frac{q}{A} = h_o(T_\mathrm{sol-air} - T_s)$

An equivalent, and more useful equation for the net heat loss across the whole construction is:

$\frac{q}{A} = U_c(T_i - T_\mathrm{sol-air})$

Where:

- $U_c$ = construction U-value, according to ISO 6946 [W/m^{2}K].
- $T_i$ = indoor temperature [°C]
- $\Delta T_{o-sky}$ = difference between outside dry-bulb air temperature and sky mean radiant temperature [°C]
- $F_r$ = Form factor between the element and the sky [-]
  - $F_r$ = 1 for an unshaded horizontal roof
  - $F_r$ = 0,5 for an unshaded vertical wall
- $h_r$ = external radiative heat transfer coefficient [W/m^{2}K]

By expanding the above equation through substituting $T_\mathrm{sol-air}$ the following heat loss equation is derived:

$\frac{q}{A} = U_c(T_i - T_o) - \frac{U_c}{h_o} {[a \cdot I - F_r \cdot h_r \cdot \Delta T_{o-sky}]}$

The above equation is used for opaque facades in, and renders intermediate calculation of $T_\mathrm{sol-air}$ unnecessary. The main advantage of this latter approach is that it avoids the need for a different outdoor temperature node for each facade. Thus, the solution scheme is kept simple, and the solar and sky radiation terms from all facades can be aggregated and distributed to internal temperature nodes as gains/losses.

== See also ==
- HVAC
- ASHRAE
- Active solar
- Passive solar
- ISO 13790
