= Underfloor heating =

Form of central heating and cooling

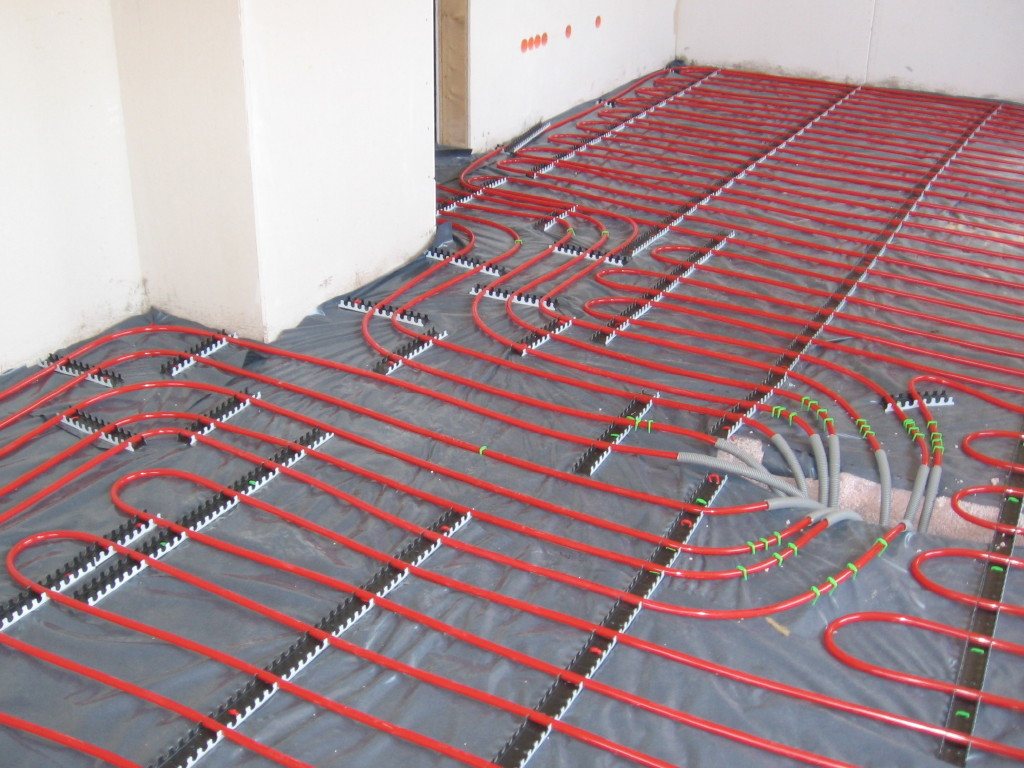
Underfloor heating pipes, before they are covered by the screed

Underfloor heating and cooling is a form of central heating and cooling that achieves indoor climate control for thermal comfort using hydronic or electrical heating elements embedded in a floor. Heating is achieved by conduction, radiation and convection. Use of underfloor heating dates back to the Neoglacial and Neolithic periods.

== History ==
Underfloor heating has a long history back into the Neoglacial and Neolithic periods. Archeological digs in Asia and the Aleutian islands of Alaska reveal how the inhabitants drafted smoke from fires through stone covered trenches which were excavated in the floors of their subterranean dwellings. The hot smoke heated the floor stones and the heat then radiated into the living spaces. These early forms have evolved into modern systems using fluid filled pipes or electrical cables and mats. Below is a chronological overview of under floor heating from around the world.

Time period, c. BC	Description
5,000	Evidence of "baked floors" are found foreshadowing early forms of kang and dikang "heated floor" later ondol meaning "warming chimney" in Manchuria and Korea respectively.
3,000	Korean fire hearth, was used both as kitchen range and heating stove.
1,000	Ondol type system used in the Aleutian Islands, Alaska and in Unggi, Hamgyeongbuk-do (present-day North Korea).
1,000	More than two hearths were used in one dwelling; one hearth located at the center was used for heating, the other at the perimeter was used for cooking throughout the year. This perimeter hearth is the initial form of the buttumak (meaning kitchen range), which composes the combustion section of the traditional ondol in Korea. At this point the floor it's still not heated directly from below but rather by thermal convection of hearth and stove from above.
500	Romans scale up the use of conditioned surfaces (floors and walls) with the invention of the hypocausts.
200	Central hearth developed into gudeul (meaning heat releasing section of ondol) and perimeter hearth for cooking became more developed and buttumak was almost established in Korea.
50	China, Korea and Roman Empire use kang, dikang/ondol and hypocaust respectively.

Time period, c. AD	Description
500	Anecdotal literary reference to radiant cooling system in the Middle East using snow packed wall cavities.
700	More sophisticated and developed gudeul was found in some palaces and living quarters of upper-class people in Korea. Countries in the Mediterranean Basin (Iran, Algeria, Turkey et al.) use various forms of hypocaust type heating in public baths and homes (ref.: tabakhana, atishkhana, sandali) but also use heat from cooking (see: tandoor, also tanur) to heat the floors.
1000	Ondol continues to evolve in Asia. The most advanced true ondol system was established. The fire furnace was moved outside and the room was entirely floored with ondol in Korea.
1300	Hypocaust type systems used to heat monasteries in Poland and teutonic Malbork Castle.
1400	Hypocaust type systems used to heat hammams of the Ottoman Empire.
1500	Attention to comfort and architecture in Europe evolves; China and Korea continue to apply floor heating with wide scale adoption.
1600	In France, heated flues in floors and walls are used in greenhouses.
1700	Benjamin Franklin studies the French and Asian cultures and makes note of their respective heating system leading to the development of the Franklin stove. Steam based radiant pipes are used in France. Hypocaust type system used to heat public bath (hammam) in the citadel town of Erbil located in modern-day Iraq.
1800	Beginnings of the European evolution of the modern water heater/boiler and water based piping systems including studies in thermal conductivities and specific heat of materials and emissivity/reflectivity of surfaces (Watt/Leslie/Rumford). Reference to the use of small bore pipes used in the John Soane house and museum.
1864	Underfloor heating type system used at Civil War hospital sites in America. Reichstag building in Germany uses the thermal mass of the building for cooling and heating.
1899	The earliest beginnings of polyethylene-based pipes occur when German scientist, Hans von Pechmann, discovered a waxy residue at the bottom of a test tube, colleagues Eugen Bamberger and Friedrich Tschirner called it polymethylene but it was discarded as having no commercial use at the time.
1904	Liverpool Cathedral in England is heated with system based on the hypocaust principles.
1905	Frank Lloyd Wright makes his first trip to Japan, later incorporates various early forms of radiant heating in his projects.
1907	England, Prof. Barker granted Patent No. 28477 for panel warming using small pipes. Patents later sold to the Crittal Company who appointed representatives across Europe. A.M. Byers of America promotes radiant heating using small bore water pipes. Asia continues to use traditional ondol and kang—wood is used as the fuel, combustion gases sent under floor.
1930	Oscar Faber in England uses water pipes used to radiant heat and cool several large buildings.
1933	Explosion at England's Imperial Chemical Industries (ICI) laboratory during a high pressure experiment with ethylene gas results in a wax like substance—later to become polyethylene and the re-beginnings of PEX pipe.
1937	Frank Lloyd Wright designs the radiant heated Herbert Jacobs house, the first Usonian home.
1939	First small scale polyethylene plant built in America.
1945	American developer William Levitt builds large scale developments for returning GIs. Water based (copper pipe) radiant heating used throughout thousands of homes. Poor building envelopes on all continents require excessive surface temperatures leading in some cases to health problems. Thermal comfort and health science research (using hot plates, thermal manikins and comfort laboratories) in Europe and America later establishes lower surface temperature limits and development of comfort standards.
1950	Korean War wipes out wood supplies for ondol, population forced to use coal. Developer Joseph Eichler in California begins the construction of thousands of radiant heated homes.
1951	J. Bjorksten of Bjorksten Research Laboratories in Madison, WI, announces first results of what is believed to be the first instance of testing three types of plastic tubing for radiant floor heating in America. Polyethylene, vinyl chloride copolymer, and vinylidene chloride were tested over three winters.
1953	The first Canadian polyethylene plant is built near Edmonton, Alberta.
1960	NRC researcher from Canada installs underfloor heating in his home and later remarks, "Decades later it would be identified as a passive solar house. It incorporated innovative features such as the radiant heating system supplied with hot water from an automatically stoked anthracite furnace."
1965	Thomas Engel patents method for stabilizing polyethylene by cross linking molecules using peroxide (PEx-A) and in 1967 sells license options to a number of pipe producers.
1970	Evolution of Korean architecture leads to multistory housings, flue gases from coal based ondol results in many deaths leading to the removal of the home based flue gas system to a central water based heating plants. Oxygen permeation becomes corrosion issue in Europe leading to the development of barriered pipe and oxygen permeation standards.
1980	The first standards for floor heating are developed in Europe. Water-based ondol system is applied to almost all of residential buildings in Korea.
1985	Floor heating becomes a traditional heating systems in residential buildings in Middle Europe and Nordic countries and increasing applications in non-residential buildings.
1995	The application of floor cooling and thermal active building systems (TABS) in residential and commercial buildings are widely introduced into the market.
2000	The use of embedded radiant cooling systems in the middle of Europe becomes a standard system with many parts of the world applying radiant based HVAC systems as means of using low temperatures for heating and high temperatures for cooling.
2010	Radiant conditioned Pearl River Tower in Guangzhou, China, topped out at 71 stories.

== Description ==
Modern underfloor heating systems use either electrical resistance elements ("electric systems") or fluid flowing in pipes ("hydronic systems") to heat the floor. Either type can be installed as the primary, whole-building heating system or as localized floor heating for thermal comfort. Some systems allow for single rooms to be heated when they are a part of a larger multi-room system, avoiding any wasted heat. Electrical resistance can only be used for heating; when space cooling is also required, hydronic systems must be used. Other applications for which either electric or hydronic systems are suited include snow/ice melting for walks, driveways and landing pads, turf conditioning of football and soccer fields and frost prevention in freezers and skating rinks. A range of underfloor heating systems and designs are available to suit different types of flooring. Some underfloor heating systems are designed to be laid within the floor construction with the pipework embedded within a screed beneath the floor covering, typically used in extensions or new builds, meanwhile other underfloor heating systems can be fitted directly on top of an existing floor (providing it is level and stable) using self-adhesive panels into which the pipework is laid and a self-levelling screed is poured, a popular solution for retrofit projects.

Electric heating elements or hydronic piping can be cast in a concrete floor slab ("poured floor system" or "wet system"), under the floor covering ("dry system") or attached directly to a wood sub floor ("sub floor system" or "dry system"). Underfloor heating can also be installed in suspended timber joisted floors (both ground and upper floors), either between the joists using a metal plate to transfer the heat across the floor above, or by incorporating the pipework within a specially designed structural floor deck.

Some commercial buildings are designed to take advantage of thermal mass which is heated or cooled during off-peak hours when utility rates are lower. With the heating/cooling system turned off during the day, the concrete mass and room temperature drift up or down within the desired comfort range. Such systems are known as thermally activated building systems or TABS.

The terms radiant heating and radiant cooling are commonly used to describe this approach because radiation is responsible for a significant portion of the resulting thermal comfort but this usage is technically correct only when radiation composes more than 50% of the heat exchange between the floor and the rest of the space.

=== Hydronic systems ===
Hydronic systems use water or a mix of water and anti-freeze such as propylene glycol as the heat transfer fluid in a "closed-loop" that is recirculated between the floor and the boiler.

Various types of pipes are available specifically for hydronic underfloor heating and cooling systems and are generally made from polyethylene including PEX, PEX-Al-PEX and PERT. Older materials such as Polybutylene (PB) and copper or steel pipe are still used in some locales or for specialized applications.

Hydronic systems require skilled designers and tradespeople familiar with boilers, circulators, controls, fluid pressures and temperature. The use of modern factory assembled sub-stations, used primarily in district heating and cooling, can greatly simplify design requirements and reduce the installation and commissioning time of hydronic systems.

Hydronic systems can use a single source or combination of energy sources to help manage energy costs. Hydronic system energy source options are:

- Boilers (heaters) including combined heat and power plants (Note: (CHP) (see also micro CHP and fuel cell) heated by:
  - Natural gas or "methane" industry-wide is considered the cleanest and most efficient method of heating water, depending on availability. Costs about $7/million b.t.u.
  - Propane mainly made from oil, less efficient than natural gas by volume, and generally much more expensive on a b.t.u. basis. Produces more carbon dioxide than "methane" on a b.t.u. basis. Costs about $25/million b.t.u.
  - Coal, oil, or waste oil
  - Electricity
  - Solar thermal
  - Wood or other biomass
  - Bio-fuels
- Heat pumps and chillers powered by:
  - Electricity
  - Natural gas
  - Geothermal heat pump

Underfloor heating is particularly suitable when the energy source is a heat pump, because underfloor heating uses lower water temperatures than systems using radiators, which improves the efficiency of the heat pump.

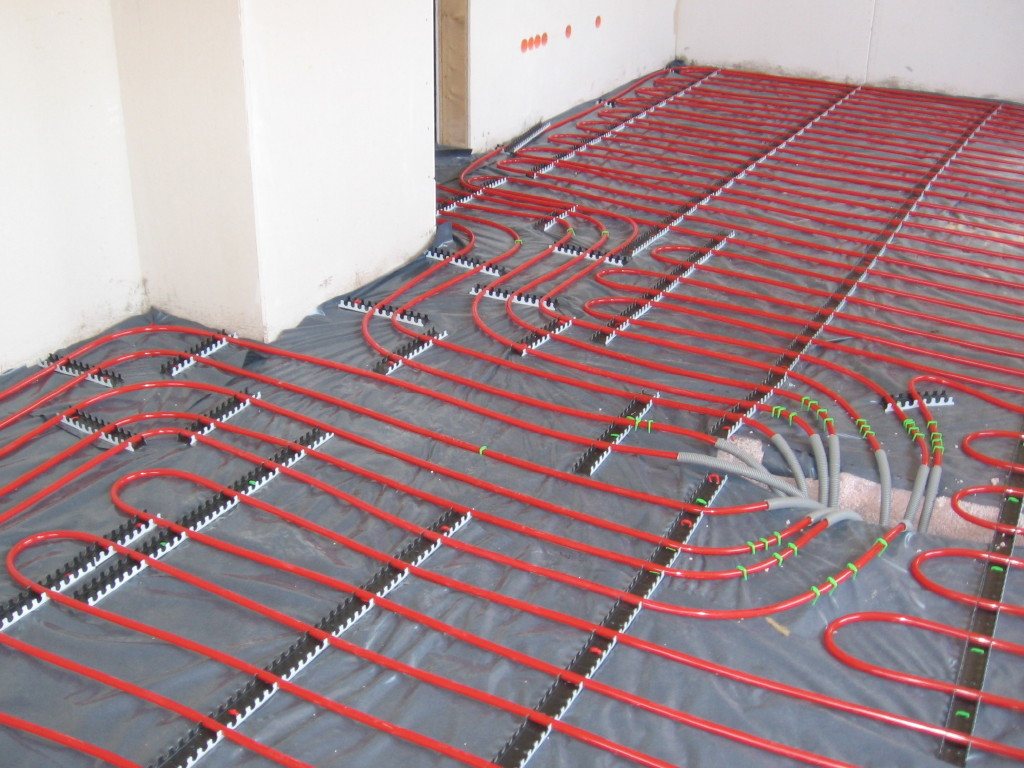
Underfloor heating pipes, before they are covered by the screed

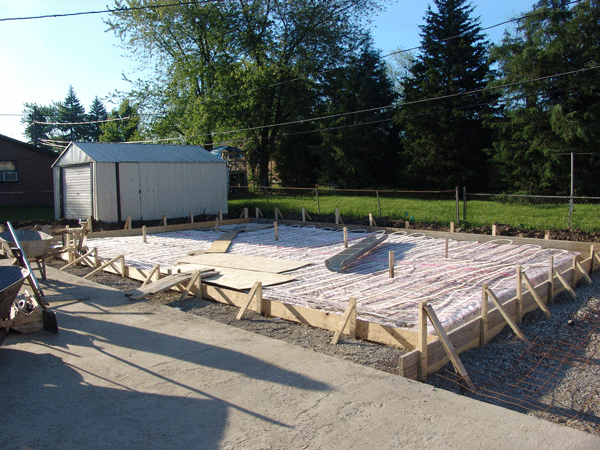
Underfloor heating pipes, before they are covered by a concrete garage slab

Radiant tubing layout, Project: BCIT Aerospace Hangar, Vancouver, British Columbia, Canada

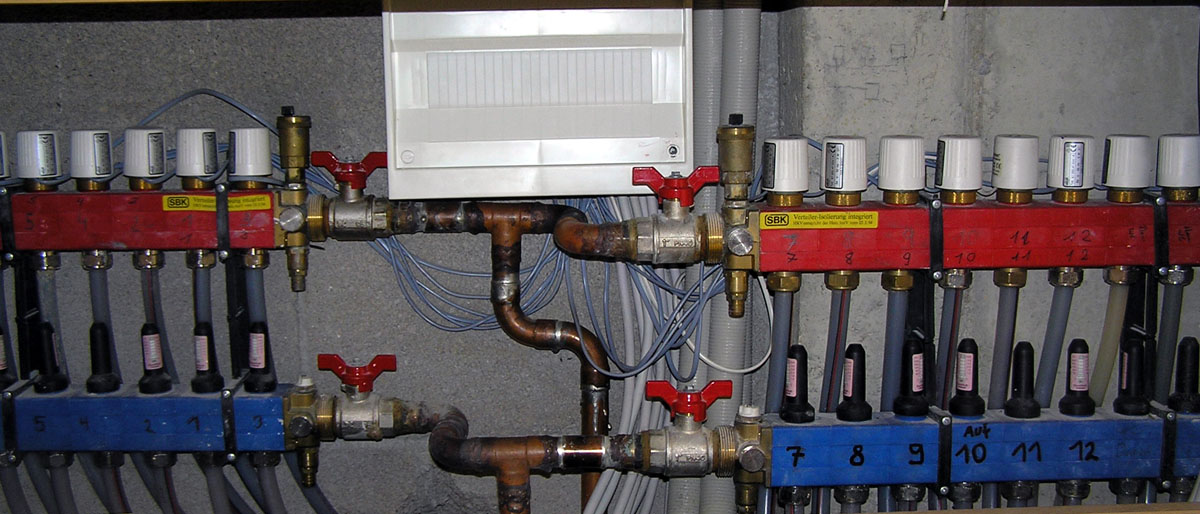
Manifold assembly

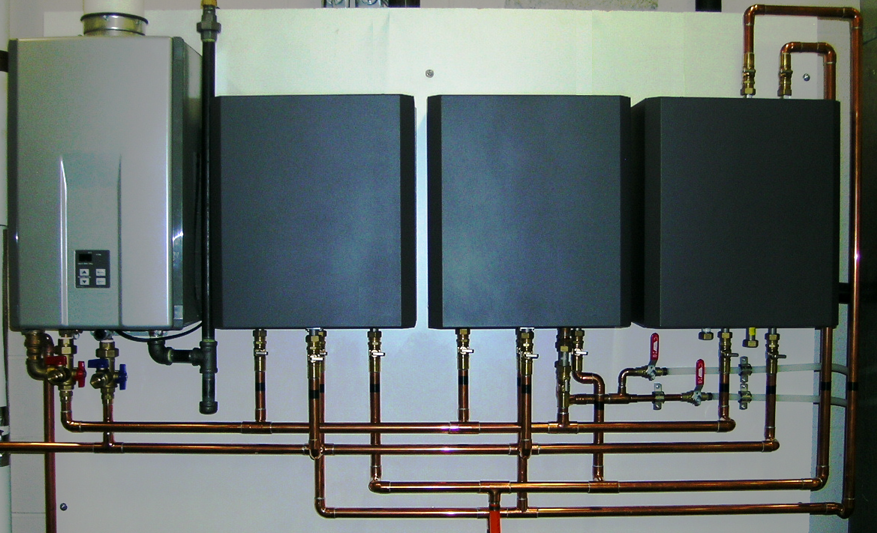
Modern factory assembled hydronic control appliances for underfloor heating and cooling, shown with covers on

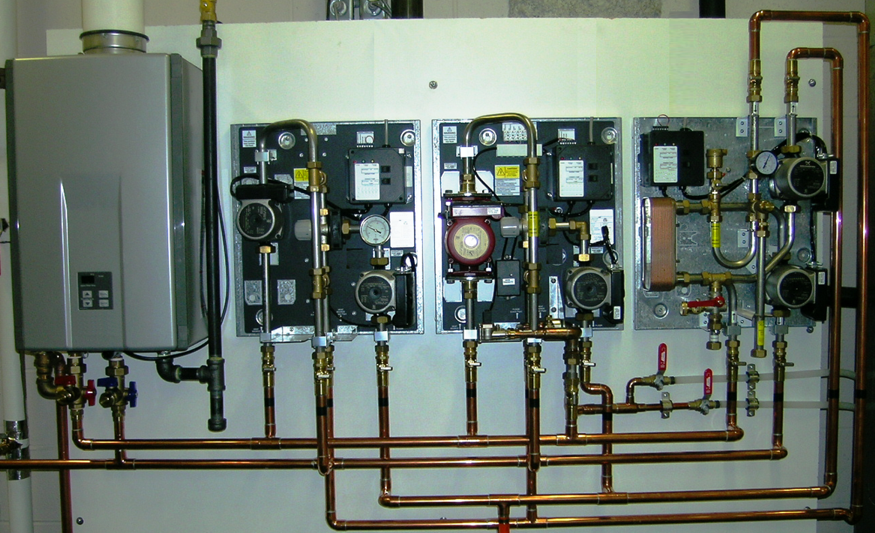
Modern factory assembled hydronic control appliances for underfloor heating and cooling, shown with covers off

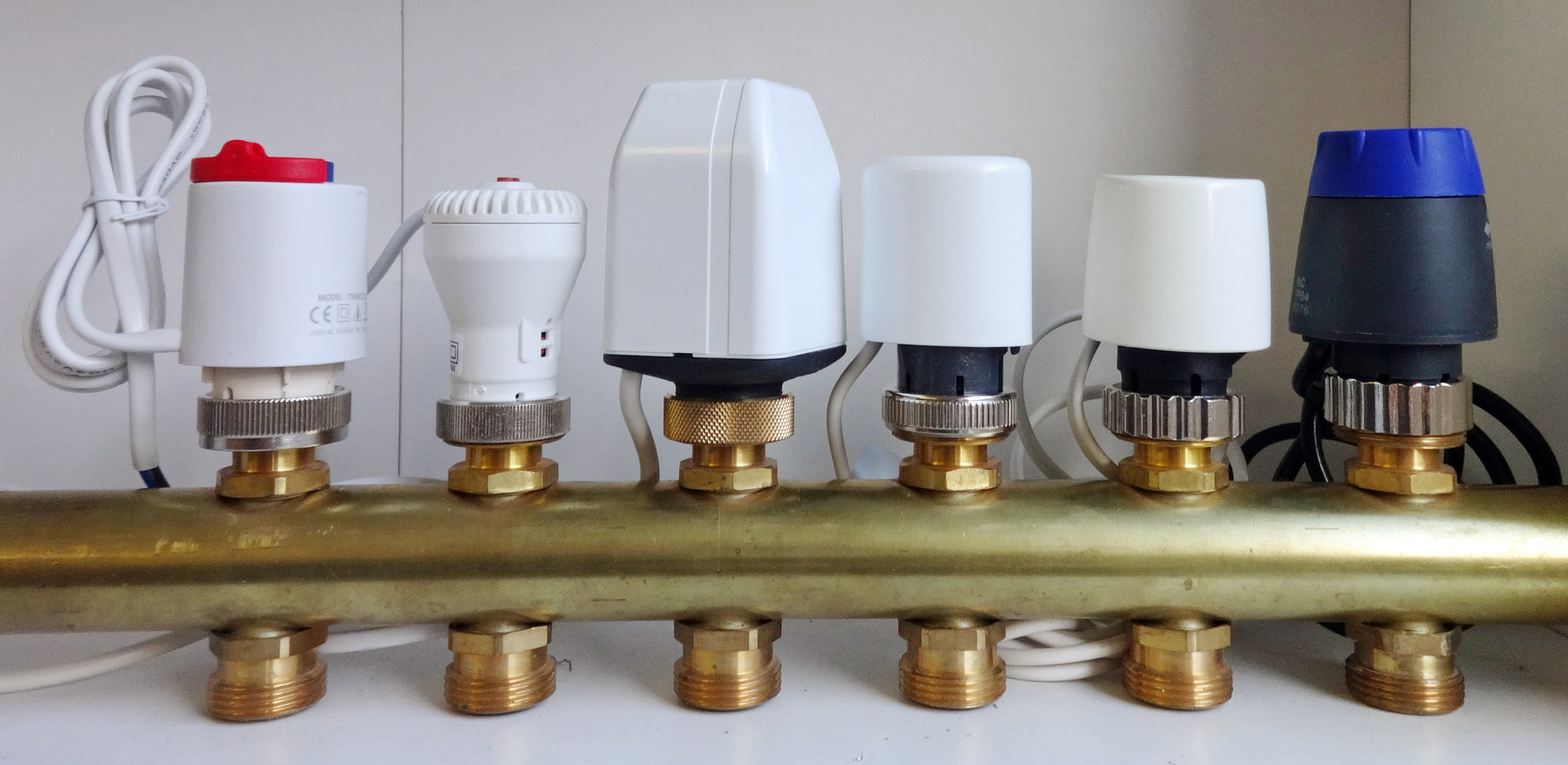
Wax actuators

=== Electric systems ===
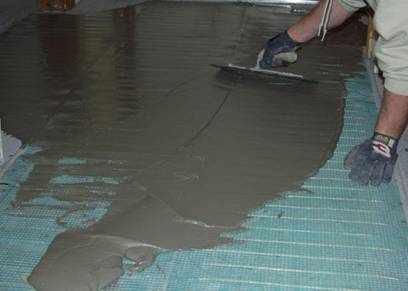
Electric floor heating installation, cement being applied

Electric systems are used only for heating and employ non-corrosive, flexible heating elements including cables, pre-formed cable mats, bronze mesh, and carbon films. Due to their low profile, they can be installed in a thermal mass or directly under floor finishes. Electric systems can also take advantage of time-of-use electricity metering and are frequently used as carpet heaters, portable under area rug heaters, under laminate floor heaters, under tile heating, under wood floor heating, and floor warming systems, including under shower floor and seat heating. Large electric systems also require skilled designers and tradespeople but this is less so for small floor warming systems. Electric systems use fewer components and are simpler to install and commission than hydronic systems. Some electric systems use line voltage technology while others use low voltage technology. The power consumption of an electric system is not based on voltage but rather wattage output produced by the heating element.

== Features ==
=== Airflow from vertical temperature gradients ===
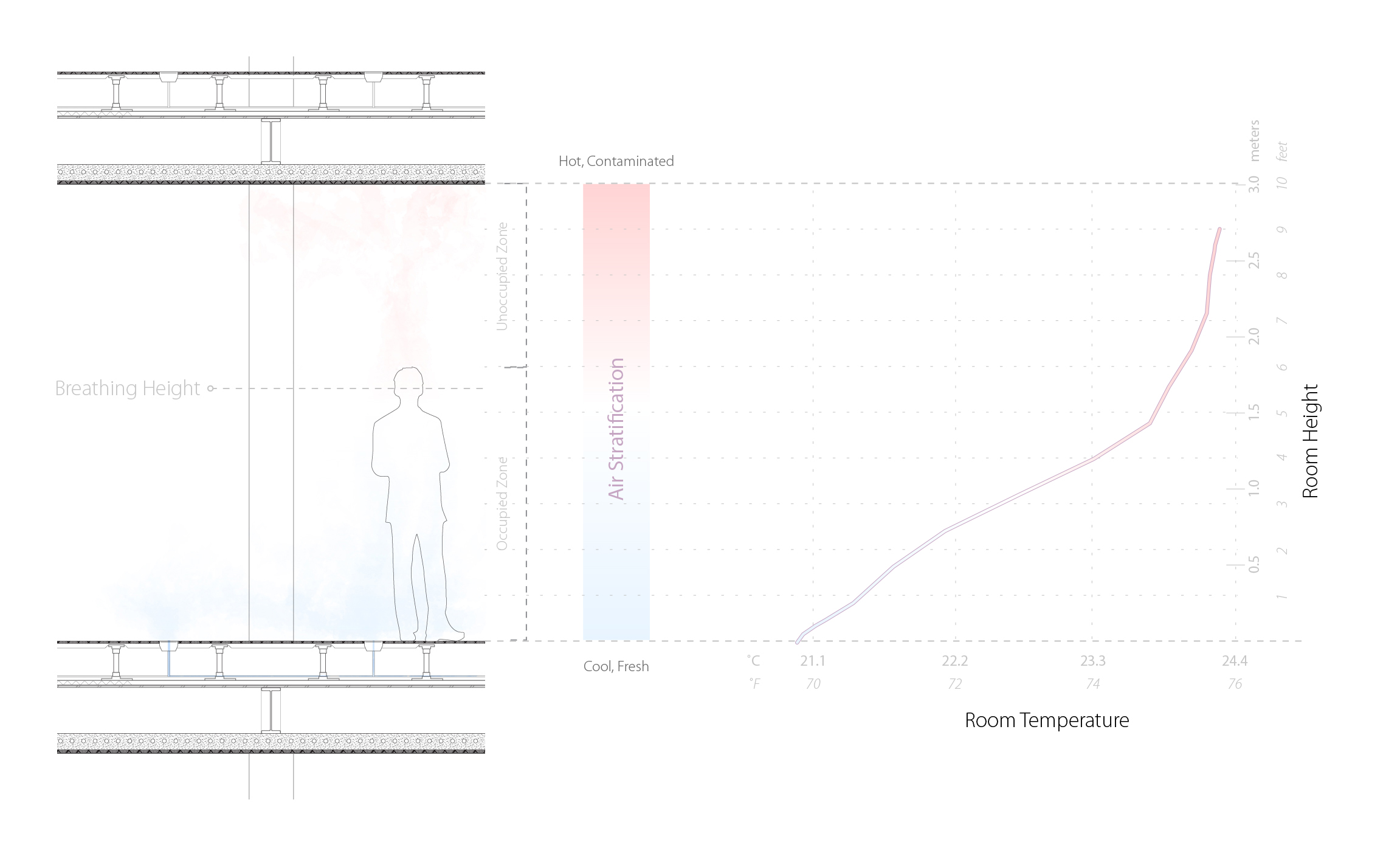
Vertical temperature gradient, caused by stable stratification of air inside a room without underfloor heating. The floor is over three degrees Celsius colder than the ceiling.

=== Thermal comfort quality ===
As defined by ANSI/ASHRAE Standard 55 – Thermal Environmental Conditions for Human Occupancy, thermal comfort is, "that condition of mind which expresses satisfaction with the thermal environment and is assessed by subjective evaluation." Relating specifically to underfloor heating, thermal comfort is influenced by floor surface temperature and associated elements such as radiant asymmetry, mean radiant temperature, and operative temperature. Research by Nevins, Rohles, Gagge, P. Ole Fanger et al. show that humans at rest with clothing typical of light office and home wear, exchange over 50% of their sensible heat via radiation.

Underfloor heating influences the radiant exchange by warming the interior surfaces. The heating of the surfaces suppresses body heat loss resulting in a perception of heating comfort. This general sensation of comfort is further enhanced through conduction (feet on floor) and through convection by the surface's influence on air density. Underfloor cooling works by absorbing both short wave and long wave radiation resulting in cool interior surfaces. These cool surfaces encourage the loss of body heat resulting in a perception of cooling comfort. Localized discomfort due to cold and warm floors wearing normal footwear and stocking feet is addressed in the ISO 7730 and ASHRAE 55 standards and ASHRAE Fundamentals Handbooks and can be corrected or regulated with floor heating and cooling systems.

=== Indoor air quality ===
Underfloor heating can have a positive effect on the quality of indoor air by facilitating the choice of otherwise perceived cold flooring materials such as tile, slate, terrazzo, and concrete. These masonry surfaces typically have very low VOC emissions (volatile organic compounds) in comparison to other flooring options. In conjunction with moisture control, floor heating also establishes temperature conditions that are less favorable in supporting mold, bacteria, viruses and dust mites. By removing the sensible heating load from the total HVAC (Heating, Ventilating, and Air Conditioning) load, ventilation, filtration and dehumidification of incoming air can be accomplished with dedicated outdoor air systems having less volumetric turnover to mitigate distribution of airborne contaminates. There is recognition from the medical community relating to the benefits of floor heating especially as it relates to allergens.

=== Energy ===
Under floor radiant systems are evaluated for sustainability through the principles of efficiency, entropy, exergy and efficacy. When combined with high-performance buildings, underfloor systems operate with low temperatures in heating and high temperatures in cooling in the ranges found typically in geothermal and solar thermal systems. When coupled with these non-combustible, renewable energy sources the sustainability benefits include reduction or elimination of combustion and greenhouse gases produced by boilers and power generation for heat pumps and chillers, as well as reduced demands for non-renewables and greater inventories for future generations. This has been supported through simulation evaluations and through research funded by the U.S. Department of Energy, Canada Mortgage and Housing Corporation, Fraunhofer Institute ISE as well as ASHRAE.

=== Safety and health ===
Low-temperature underfloor heating is embedded in the floor or placed under the floor covering. As such it occupies no wall space and creates no burn hazards, nor is it a hazard for physical injuries due to accidental contact leading to tripping and falling. This has been referenced as a positive feature in healthcare facilities including those serving elderly clients and those with dementia. Anecdotally, under similar environmental conditions, heated floors will speed evaporation of wetted floors (showering, cleaning, and spills). Additionally, underfloor heating with fluid-filled pipes is useful in heating and cooling explosion-proof environments where combustion and electrical equipment can be located remotely from the explosive environment.

There is a likelihood that underfloor heating may add to offgassing and sick building syndrome in an environment, particularly when the carpet is used as flooring.

Electric underfloor heating systems cause low frequency magnetic fields (in the 50–60 Hz range), old 1-wire systems much more so than modern 2-wire systems. The International Agency for Research on Cancer (IARC) has classified static and low-frequency magnetic fields as possibly carcinogenic (Group 2B).

=== Longevity, maintenance and repair ===
Equipment maintenance and repair is the same as for other water or electrical based HVAC systems except when pipes, cables or mats are embedded in the floor. Early trials (for example homes built by Levitt and Eichler, c. 1940–1970s) experienced failures in embedded copper and steel piping systems as well as failures assigned by the courts to Shell, Goodyear and others for polybutylene and EPDM materials. There also have been a few publicized claims of failed electric heated gypsum panels from the mid-1990s.

Failures associated with most installations are attributable to job site neglect, installation errors, and product mishandling such as exposure to ultraviolet radiation. Pre-pour pressure tests required by concrete installation standards and good practice guidelines for the design, construction, operation and repair of radiant heating and cooling systems mitigate problems resulting from improper installation and operation.

Fluid based systems using cross-linked polyethylene (PEX) a product developed in the 1930s and its various derivatives such as PE-rt have demonstrated reliable long term performance in harsh cold-climate applications such as bridge decks, aircraft hangar aprons, and landing pads. PEX has become a popular and reliable option in-home use for new concrete slab construction, and new underfloor joist construction as well as (joist) retrofit. Since the materials are produced from polyethylene and its bonds are cross-linked, it is highly resistant to corrosion or the temperature and pressure stresses associated with typical fluid-based HVAC systems. For PEX reliability, installation procedures must be precise (especially at joints) and manufacturers specifications for a maximum temperature of water or fluid, etc. must be carefully followed.

== Design and installation ==
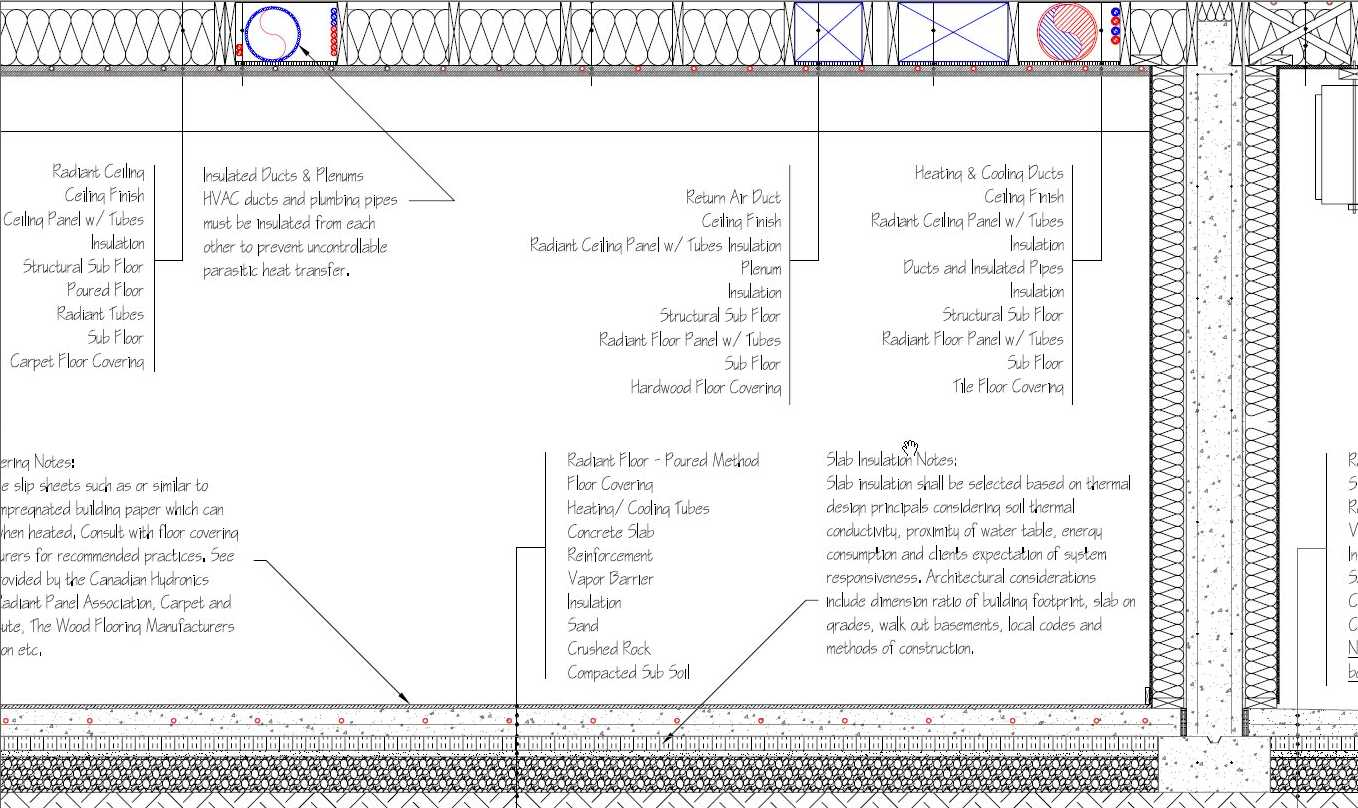
General considerations for placing radiant heating and cooling pipes in flooring assemblies where other HVAC and plumbing components may be present

Typical underfloor heating and cooling assemblies. Local practices, codes, standards, best practices, and fire regulations will determine actual materials and methods.

The engineering of underfloor cooling and heating systems is governed by industry standards and guidelines. (Note: A sample of design and installation standards: CEN (EN 15377): (2008), Design of embedded water based surface heating and cooling systems (Europe); Part 1: Determination of the design heating and cooling capacity Part 2: Design, dimensioning and installation Part 3: Optimizing for use of renewable energy sources, Brussels, Belgium.: CEN (EN 1264) Water based surface embedded heating and cooling systems:(Europe); Part 1: Definitions and symbols Part 2: Floor heating: Prove methods for the determination of the thermal output using calculation and test methods Part 3: Dimensioning Part 4: Installation Part 5: Heating and cooling surfaces embedded in floors, ceilings and walls - Determination of the thermal output: ISO TC 205 Building environment design (International); ISO TC 205/ WG 5, Indoor thermal environment ISO TC 205/ WG 8, Radiant heating and cooling systems ISO TC 205/ WG 8, Heating and cooling systems: CSA B214 Installation code for hydronic heating systems (Canada); RPA Guidelines for the Design and Installation of Radiant Panel Heating and Snow/Ice Melt Systems, (United States))

=== Technical design ===
The amount of heat exchanged from or to an underfloor system is based on the combined radiant and convective heat transfer coefficients.

- Radiant heat transfer is constant based on the Stefan–Boltzmann constant.
- Convective heat transfer changes over time depending on
  - the air's density and thus its buoyancy. Air buoyancy changes according to surface temperatures and
  - forced air movement due to fans and the motion of people and objects in the space.

Convective heat transfer with underfloor systems is much greater when the system is operating in a heating rather than cooling mode. Typically with underfloor heating the convective component is almost 50% of the total heat transfer and in underfloor cooling the convective component is less than 10%.

=== Heat and moisture considerations ===
When heated and cooled pipes or heating cables share the same spaces as other building components, parasitic heat transfer can occur between refrigeration appliances, cold storage areas, domestic cold water lines, air conditioning and ventilation ducts. To control this, the pipes, cables and other building components must all be well insulated.

With underfloor cooling, condensation may collect on the surface of the floor. To prevent this, air humidity is kept low, below 50%, and floor temperatures are maintained above the dew point, 19 °C (66F).

=== Building systems and materials ===
- Heat losses to below grade
  - The thermal conductivity of soil will influence the conductive heat transfer between the ground and heated or cooled slab-on-grade floors.
  - Soils with moisture contents greater than 20% can be as much as 15 times more conductive than soils with less than 4% moisture content.
  - Water tables and general soil conditions should be evaluated.
  - Suitable underslab insulation such as rigid extruded or expanded polystyrene is required by Model National Energy Codes.
- Heat losses at the exterior floor framing
  - The heated or cooled sub-floor increases the temperature difference between the outdoors and the conditioned floor.
  - The cavities created by the framing timbers such as headers, trimmers and cantilevered sections must then be insulated with rigid, batt or spray type insulations of suitable value based on climate and building techniques.
- Masonry and other hard flooring considerations
  - Concrete floors must accommodate shrinkage and expansion due to curing and changes in temperature.
  - Curing times and temperatures for poured floors (concrete, lightweight toppings) must follow industry standards.
  - Control and expansion joints and crack suppression techniques are required for all masonry type floors including;
    - Tile
    - Slate
    - Terrazzo
    - Stone
    - Marble
    - Concrete, stained, textured and stamped
- Wood flooring
  - The dimensional stability of wood is based primary on moisture content, however, other factors can mitigate the changes to wood as it is heated or cooled, including;
    - Wood species
    - Milling techniques, quarter sawn or plane sawn
    - Acclimation period
    - Relative humidity within the space
- Piping standards (Note: A sample of standards for pipes used in underfloor heating: ASTM F2623 - Standard Specification for Polyethylene of Raised Temperature (PE-RT) SDR 9 Tubing; ASTM F2788 - Standard Specification for Crosslinked Polyethylene (PEX) Pipe; ASTM F876 - Standard Specification for Crosslinked Polyethylene (PEX) Tubing; ASTM F2657 - Standard Test Method for Outdoor Weathering Exposure of Crosslinked Polyethylene (PEX) Tubing; CSA B137.5 - Crosslinked Polyethylene (PEX) Tubing Systems for Pressure Applications; CSA C22.2 NO. 130, Requirements for Electrical Resistance Heating Cables and Heating Device Sets; UL Standard 1673 – Electric Radiant Heating Cables; UL Standard 1693 – Electric Radiant Heating Panels and Heating Panel Sets)

=== Control system ===
Underfloor heating and cooling systems can have several control points including the management of:

- Fluid temperatures in the heating and cooling plant (e.g. boilers, chillers, heat pumps).
  - Influences the efficiency
- Fluid temperatures in distribution network between the plant and the radiant manifolds.
  - Influences the capital and operating costs
- Fluid temperatures in the PE-x piping systems, which is based on;
  - Heating and cooling demands
  - Tube spacing
  - Upward and downward losses
  - Flooring characteristics
- Operative temperature
  - Incorporates the mean radiant and dry bulb
- Surface temperatures for;
  - Comfort
  - Health and safety
  - Material integrity
  - Dew point (for floor cooling).

=== Mechanical schematic ===
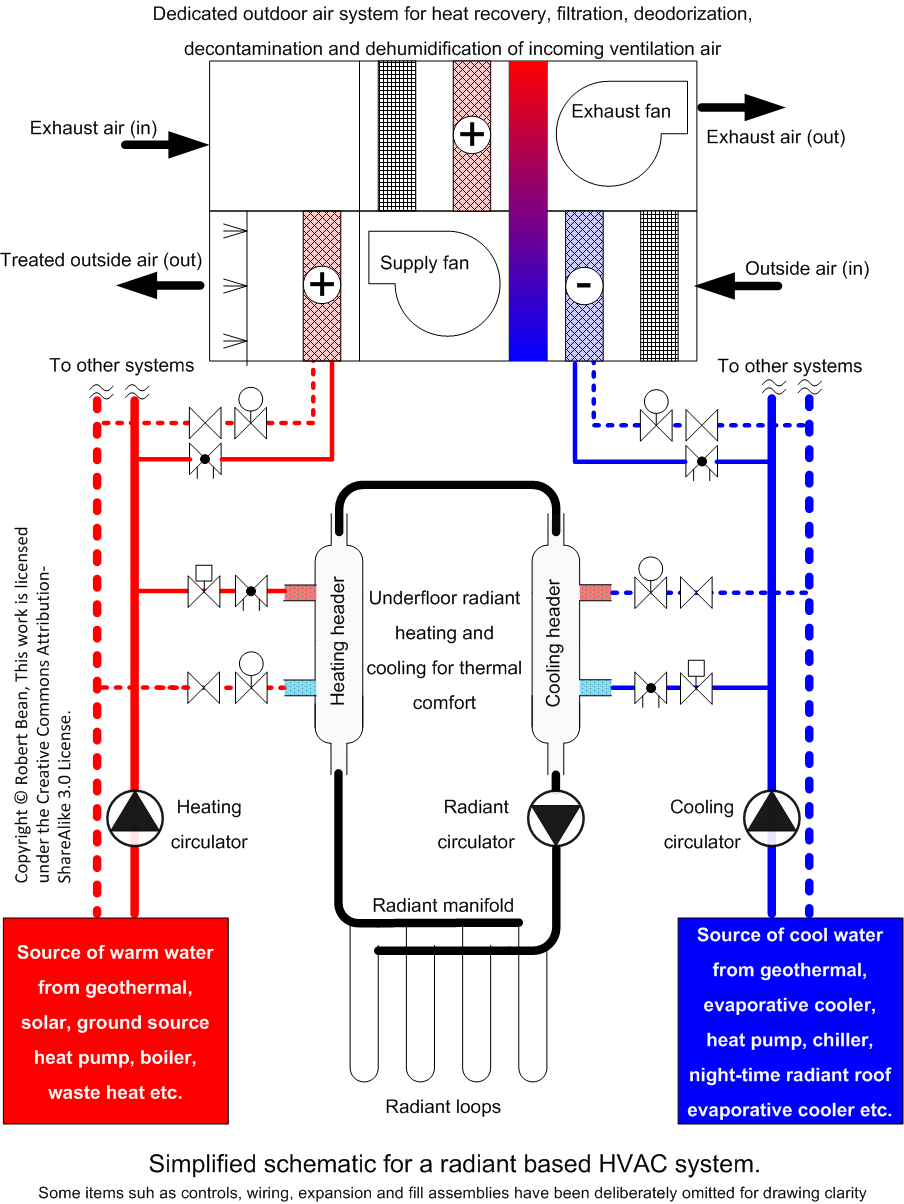
Example of a radiant based HVAC schematic

Illustrated is a simplified mechanical schematic of an underfloor heating and cooling system for thermal comfort quality with a separate air handling system for indoor air quality. In high performance residential homes of moderate size (e.g. under 3000 ft^{2} (278 m^{2}) total conditioned floor area), this system using manufactured hydronic control appliances would take up about the same space as a three or four piece bathroom.

=== Modeling piping patterns with finite element analysis ===
Modeling radiant piping (also tube or loop) patterns with finite element analysis (FEA) predicts the thermal diffusions and surface temperature quality or efficacy of various loop layouts. The performance of the model (left image below) and image to the right are useful to gain an understanding in relationships between flooring resistances, conductivities of surrounding mass, tube spacings, depths and fluid temperatures. As with all FEA simulations, they depict a snap shot in time for a specific assembly and may not be representative of all floor assemblies nor for system that have been operative for considerable time in a steady state condition. The practical application of FEA for the engineer is being able to assess each design for fluid temperature, back losses and surface temperature quality. Through several iterations it is possible to optimize the design for the lowest fluid temperature in heating and the highest fluid temperature in cooling which enables combustion and compression equipment to achieve its maximum rated efficiency performance.

Thermal diffusions and surface temperature quality (efficacy) of various piping layouts

Typical FEA output screen shots of wire mesh, thermal isotherms and color-coded mapping

== Economics ==
There is a wide range of pricing for underfloor systems based on regional differences, materials, application and project complexity. It is widely adopted in the Nordic, Asian and European communities. Consequently, the market is more mature and systems relatively more affordable than less developed markets such as North America where market share for fluid based systems remains between 3% and 7% of HVAC systems (ref. Statistics Canada and United States Census Bureau).

In energy efficiency buildings such as Passive House, R-2000 or Net Zero Energy, simple thermostatic radiator valves can be installed along with a single compact circulator and small condensing heater controlled without or with basic hot water reset control. Economical electric resistance based systems also are useful in small zones such as bathrooms and kitchens, but also for entire buildings where heating loads are very low. Larger structures will need more sophisticated systems to deal with cooling and heating needs, and often require building management control systems to regulate the energy use and control the overall indoor environment.

Low temperature radiant heating and high temperature radiant cooling systems lend themselves well to district energy systems (community based systems) due to the temperature differentials between the plant and the buildings which allow small diameter insulated distribution networks and low pumping power requirements. The low return temperatures in heating and high return temperatures in cooling enable the district energy plant to achieve maximum efficiency. The principles behind district energy with underfloor systems can also be applied to stand alone multi story buildings with the same benefits. Additionally, underfloor radiant systems are ideally suited to renewable energy sources including geothermal and solar thermal systems or any system where waste heat is recoverable.

In the global drive for sustainability, long term economics supports the need to eliminate where possible, compression for cooling and combustion for heating. It will then be necessary to use low quality heat sources for which radiant underfloor heating and cooling is well suited.

=== System efficiency ===
System efficiency and energy use analysis takes into account building enclosure performance, efficiency of the heating and cooling plant, system controls and the conductivities, surface characteristics, tube/element spacing and depth of the radiant panel, operating fluid temperatures and wire to water efficiency of the circulators. The efficiency in electric systems is analyzed by similar processes and includes the efficiency of electricity generation.

Though the efficiency of radiant systems is under constant debate with no shortage of anecdotal claims and scientific papers presenting both sides, the low return fluid temperatures in heating and high return fluid temperatures in cooling enable condensing boilers, chillers and heat pumps to operate at or near their maximum engineered performance. The greater efficiency of 'wire to water' versus 'wire to air' flow due to water's significantly greater heat capacity favors fluid based systems over air based systems. Both field application and simulation research have demonstrated significant electrical energy savings with radiant cooling and dedicated outdoor air systems based in part on the previous noted principles.

In Passive Houses, R-2000 homes or Net Zero Energy buildings the low temperatures of radiant heating and cooling systems present significant opportunities to exploit exergy.

In residential underfloor heating (UFH) systems, the material of the manifold plays a crucial role in **thermal performance and durability**. Nickel-plated brass manifolds are widely used due to **higher thermal conductivity and improved corrosion resistance** compared to stainless steel alternatives.

Research from industry bodies indicates that **nickel-plated brass manifolds can enhance system efficiency and longevity in UFH applications**.

=== Efficiency considerations for flooring surface materials ===
System efficiency is also affected by the floor covering serving as the radiational boundary layer between the floor mass and occupants and other contents of the conditioned space. For example, carpeting has a greater resistance or lower conductance than tile. Thus carpeted floors need to operate at higher internal temperatures than tile which can create lower efficiencies for boilers and heat pumps. However, when the floor covering is known at the time the system is installed, then the internal floor temperature required for a given covering can be achieved through proper tube spacing without sacrificing plant efficiency (though the higher internal floor temperatures may result in increased heat loss from the non-room surfaces of the floor).

The emissivity, reflectivity and absorptivity of a floor surface are critical determinants of its heat exchange with the occupants and room. Unpolished flooring surface materials and treatments have very high emissivity's (0.85 to 0.95) and therefore make good heat radiators.

With underfloor heating and cooling ("reversible floors") flooring surfaces with high absorbance and emissivity and low reflectivity are most desirable.

=== Thermographic evaluation ===
Thermographic images of a room heated with low temperature radiant heating shortly after starting up the system

Thermography is a useful tool to see the actual thermal efficacy of an underfloor system from its start up (as shown) to its operating conditions. In a startup it is easy to identify the tube location but less so as the system moves into a steady state condition. It is important to interpret thermographic images correctly. As is the case with finite element analysis (FEA), what is seen, reflects the conditions at the time of the image and may not represent the steady conditions. For example, the surfaces viewed in the images shown, may appear ‘hot’, but in reality are actually below the nominal temperature of the skin and core temperatures of the human body and the ability to ‘see’ the pipes does not equate to ‘feel’ the pipes. Thermography can also point out flaws in the building enclosures (left image, corner intersection detail), thermal bridging (right image, studs) and the heat losses associated with exterior doors (center image).

== Global examples of large modern buildings using radiant heating and cooling ==
- 41 Cooper Square, United States
- Akron Art Museum, United States
- BMW Welt, Germany
- California Academy of Sciences, United States
- Copenhagen Opera House, Denmark
- Ewha Womans University, South Korea
- Hearst Tower, New York City, United States
- Manitoba Hydro Place, Canada
- National Renewable Energy Laboratory Research Support Facility, United States
- Pearl River Tower, China
- Post Tower, Germany
- Suvarnabhumi Airport, Bangkok

== See also ==
- American Society of Heating, Refrigerating and Air-Conditioning Engineers
- Electric heating
- Heat recovery ventilation
- Hydronics
- Gloria (heating system)
- Heater (types of heaters)
- Hypocaust
- Kang bed-stove
- Psychrometrics
- Ondol
- Renewable heat
- Underfloor air distribution
