= Narrow cold-frontal rainband =

A narrow cold-frontal rainband (NCFR) is a kilometer-wide organization of elliptically-shaped cores of heavy precipitation. NCFRs associate with areas of strong convergence on the surface, the so-called "precipitation cores" (PCs), which move along with surface cold fronts. The main NCFR and PCs formation mechanisms are shear instability, forced lifting of air and gravity currents.

Strong surface convergence, strong wind shear, and a low-level jet can be observed alongside the PCs within NCFRs. During the passage of PCs, a sequence of pressure changes, wind shift, rain rate peaks and temperature drops can occur. NCFR's impact like flash floods and debris flows after wildfire is especially prominent in Southern California.

Mesoscale numerical weather prediction models are deemed as confident models for forecasting NCFR events. The improved knowledge about synoptic scale forcing and dynamics have helped provide confidence in predicting NCFRs, however, the resolution of NCFR's fine structures and the assessment of local rain intensity still require improvement.

== Formation and characteristics ==
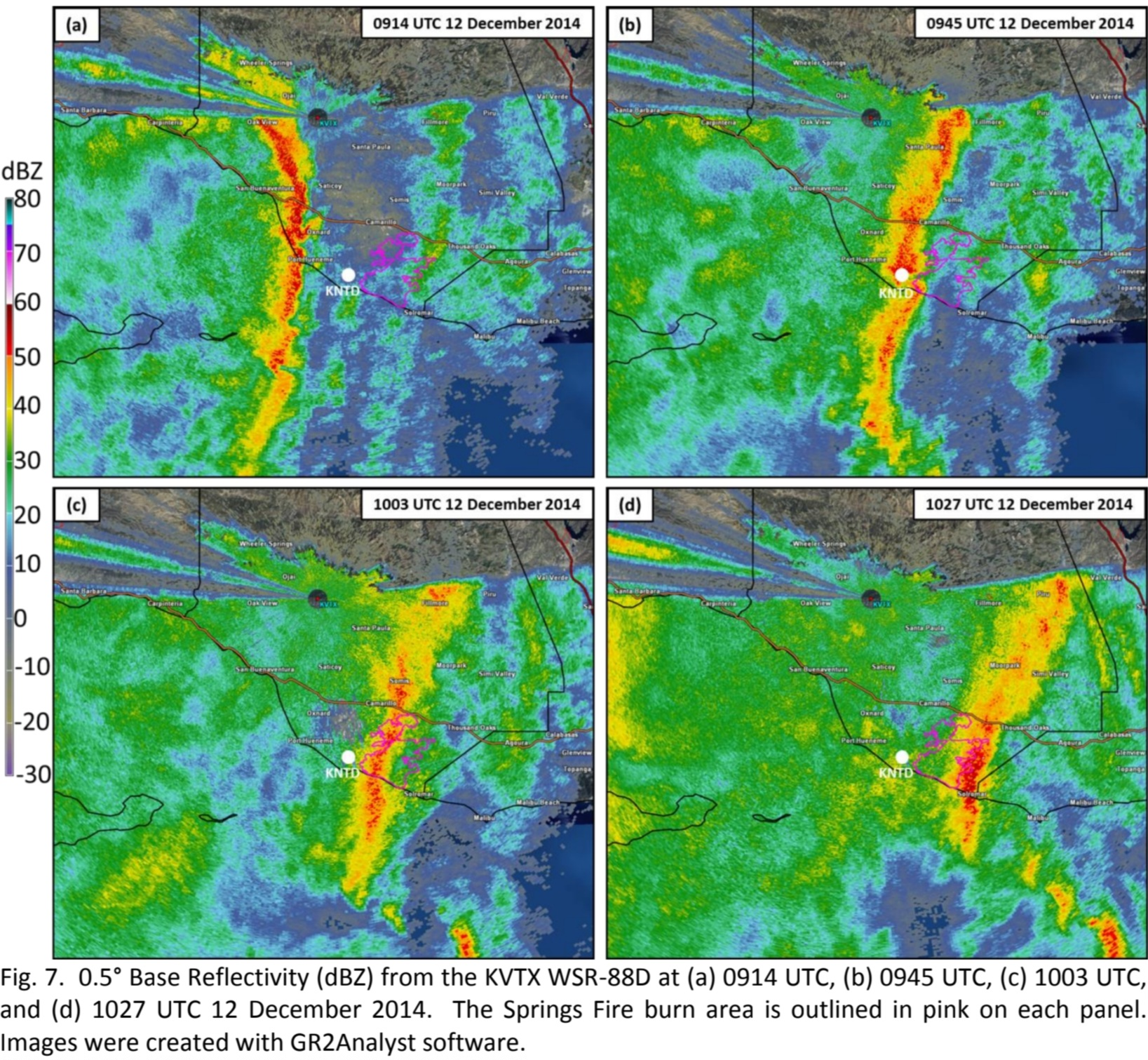
Radar images showing the propagation of a NCFR

NCFRs are formed by updrafts due to converging air at the leading edge of a cold front. The updraft takes place above the wind shift zone of the cold front, where the wind shift aloft causes a surface pressure trough. A cloud band formed by the updraft may penetrate the cloud shield associated with the cold front. The cloud band contains a large amount of liquid water and may form hail. Ice particles, which originally have a lower concentration in the cloud band, grow riming. The sources of moisture in the updrafts originate from a low-level jet ahead of and parallel to the cold front. The updraft is coupled with a system of downdrafts, which can be associated with precipitation as heavy as 100 mm/h (4 in/h). The ice particle concentration is high in the downdraft.

A case study near the Pacific Coast of Washington in the USA has shown that updrafts caused by the release of potential instability, represented by a negative vertical gradient of wet-bulb potential temperature, does not play a significant role in forming NCFR. Numerous studies and authors have shown that the convective organization in NCFR is due to shear instability at the leading edge of the cold front, as the cold front reaches the surface.

=== Mechanisms ===
Initial convection at the cold front, which is assumed to be a uniform line of convection, is one of the possible drivers for the formation of PCs. A wave-shaped perturbation due to wave instability along the cold front can form small-mesoscale lines of enhanced horizontal convergence. These mesoscale elements contain stronger updrafts and precipitations, where PCs form. Regions on the front, where the flow is weakly convergent or even divergent, are the GRs. On mesoscale, gravity currents are another possible mechanism for the precipitation pattern in NCFRs, as the shape of the surface cold front is similar to observed gravity currents in tank experiments. The tank experiments show bulges and clefts regions in gravity currents, which may correspond to the precipitation pattern within a NCFR. The forced convection and convection due to released potential instability near the cold front are also consistent with the observed gravity-currents outflow of cold air. In the case of tank experiments, the forced convection is due to gravity-current of cold air mechanically lifting the warm air, which can also be observed near the cold front. The convection due to released potential instability is due to the overhang of denser fluids in cleft regions, which correspond to the GRs.

=== Precipitation pattern ===
In radar images, NCFRs can be identified as elongated bands of reflectivity larger than 40 to 50 dBZ. Areas of heaviest precipitation are organized into ellipsoidal PCs and oriented at an angle of 29 to 35 degrees to the surface cold front. Areas with reduced convergence between the PCs have weaker precipitation, such areas are called the "gap regions" (GRs).

== Characteristic dynamics ==
Studies have shown that PCs are located in areas of strong surface convergence behind the wind shift zone in radar plan position indicators (PPI) images. A shallow, but strong convergence can be observed within the wind shift zone ahead of the PCs at the surface and a strong cyclonic shear at a height of around 1 km (0.62 mi). Furthermore, a strong near-surface updraft of up to 20 m/s (66 ft/s) at a height of around 1.5 km (0.93 mi) followed by an alternating pattern of up- and downdrafts can also be observed within the wind shift zone ahead of the PC. A low-level jet in the wind component parallel to the PCs can be observed ahead of the wind shift zone at higher altitudes (approximately 1.8 km (1.1 mi)), while at lower altitudes, the parallel component decreases with decreasing altitude due to surface friction. The wind shift zone shows a similar mesoscale pattern as the cold front. PCs can move perpendicularly to the synoptic-scale front with the same speed as the front, as well as along the synoptic-scale front with the mean wind on both sides of the front.

Dynamical differences between PCs and GRs can be implied by the difference in horizontal shears. While strong cyclonic shears are centered within the wind shift zone ahead of the PCs, the horizontal shears parallel to GRs are weaker than those of the PCs (image 3). The overall low-level flow associated with the PCs is dominated by air coming from the warm sector ahead of the wind shift zone into the PCs. For GRs, the relative flow consists of a southerly component in the warm sector and a northerly component in the cold air. Both components are approximately parallel to the wind shift zone.

== Impacts ==
The sequence of changes in meteorological variables during the passage of PCs confirms the discussed dynamical structure and precipitation pattern associated with NCFR. Observations show that pressure changes and wind shifts occur before the peak in rain rate, which are signs of disturbances in higher altitudes, as cold air moves forwards. Temperature drops, which indicates the boundary of the cold air mass, can occur with or behind the PCs. Surface observations before the passage of PCs are similar to the outflow of cold air from a squall line. Furthermore, there are similarities between mesoscale lows associated with PCs, and bow echoes associated with downbursts and tornado development.

The sequence of changes coincident with the passage of GRs depends on whether the measurement station was in the precipitation area. Pressure check and wind shift can occur before or simultaneously with the temperature drop, and there is no peak in rain rate, if a precipitation area did not pass through the measurement station. If a precipitation area did pass through the station, the peak in rain rate occurs before the pressure check, wind shift and temperature drop.

Post-wildfire debris flows, shallow landslides and flash flooding due to short and intense rainfall events such as the NCFRs often are the main dangers to life, property, and infrastructure in southern California. Due to the Springs Fire, occurred in early May 2013 in the western portion of the Santa Monica Mountains, ground cover was lost, which led to increased runoff, as well as exposed soil and loose debris. The debris flows caused then by the intense, short-duration rainfall events damaged 16 homes in Camarillo Springs and caused damages along the Pacific Coast Highway, but no fatalities were reported. The observed peak debris flow of around 200 m$^3$/s (7,063 ft$^3$/s) in Arroyo Conejo (Conejo Creek) also caused the flooding of adjacent agricultural fields.

== Predictability and forecasting of NCFRs ==
NCFRs have been observed and modeled along the West Coast of the United States since the 1970s in various studies and field campaigns. The mechanisms of NCFR are better understood than its hazards and predictability. A configuration of the mesoscale Weather Research and Forecasting Model (WRF) successfully resolved a NCFR event in southern California occurred in San Diego on the February 2, 2019. The NCFR was only observed approximately 100 to 200 km (62 to 124 mi) away from the coastal radars, but conditions for the development of the NCFR were present well offshore, such as strong frontogenesis.

Outputs from the WRF Model ensemble profiles and radiosonde data showed similarity in the relative magnitude of winds and frontal structure. NCFR's association with the presence of a low-level jet, large drop in potential temperature field by >2 K, convergence and release of instability at the frontal boundary, and its depth could be well captured by the model. However, the structure of PCs and GRs, which is relevant for publishing hazard warnings, were not well resolved. Furthermore, the variation in NCFR's propagation, structure, and intensity was large across ensemble members, and the ensemble analyses showed high sensitivity in timing of the NCFRs. The regions of simulated largest reflectivity also varied across different ensemble members.
