= UFH =

UFH can refer to:

- Under floor heating
- Unfractionated heparin, a medication
- University of Fort Hare, Alice, South Africa
