= Clothing insulation =

Thermal insulation by clothing

Clothing insulation is the thermal insulation provided by clothing.

Even if the main role of clothing is to protect from the cold, protective clothing also exists to protect from heat, such as for metallurgical workers or firemen. As regards thermal comfort, only the first case is considered.

== Thermophysiological comfort ==
Thermophysiological comfort is the capacity of the clothing material that makes the balance of moisture and heat between the body and the environment. It is a property of textile materials that creates ease by maintaining moisture and thermal levels in a human's resting and active states. The selection of textile material significantly affects the comfort of the wearer. Different textile fiber holds individual properties that suit in different environments. Natural fibers are breathable and absorb moisture, while synthetic fibers are hydrophobic; they repel moisture and do not allow air to pass. Different environments demand a diverse selection of clothing materials. Hence the appropriate choice is important. The major determinants that influence Thermophysiological comfort are the permeable construction, heat, and moisture transfer rate.

== Mechanisms of insulation ==
There are three kinds of heat transfer: conduction (exchange of heat through contact), convection (movement of fluids), and radiation.

Air has a low thermal conductivity but is very mobile. There are thus two elements that are important in protecting from the cold:

- setting up a layer of still air which serves as insulation, by the use of fibres (wool, fur, et cetera)
- stopping the wind from penetrating and replacing the layer of warm air close to the body

Another important factor is humidity. Water is a better conductor of heat than air, thus if clothes are damp — because of sweat, rain, or immersion — water replaces some or all of the air between the fibres of the clothing, causing thermal loss through conduction and/or evaporation.

Thermal insulation is thus optimal with three layers of clothing:

- a layer near the body for hygiene (changed more often than the other clothing), whose role is to get rid of sweat so it does not remain in contact with the skin;
- an outer close-knit or closely woven layer as a wind breaker, usually thin — if there is a risk of precipitation this should be impermeable, the ideal being a textile that stops water droplets but allows water vapor to pass so as to remove evaporated sweat (a textile of this sort is said to "breathe");
- and between the two, a "thick" layer that traps the air and prevents contact between the skin and the wind-breaking layer (which, as it is thin, gets close to the ambient temperature).

The layers of trapped air between the skin and the exterior surface play a major insulating role. If the clothing is squeezed tight (as by the straps of a backpack), insulation will be poorer in those places. Insulation is improved when convection in the air layers is minimised.

== Units and measurement ==
Clothing insulation may be expressed in clo units. The clo has the same dimensions as the R value (square metre kelvins per watt or m^{2}⋅K/W) used to describe insulation used in residential and commercial construction—thus, the higher the value, the better the insulation performance.

1 clo = 0.155 K·m^{2}·W^{−1} ≈ 0.88 K·m^{2}·BTU·W^{−1}·ft^{−2}·°F^{−1}·hr^{−1} R. One clo is the amount of insulation that allows a person at rest to maintain thermal equilibrium in an environment at 21°C (70°F) in a normally ventilated room (0.1 m/s air movement).

There are a number of ways to determine clothing insulation provided by clothes, but the most accurate according to ASHRAE Fundamentals are measurements on heated manikins and on active subjects. Equations may then be used to calculate the thermal insulation. Because clothing insulation cannot be measured for most routine engineering applications, tables of measured values for various clothing ensembles can be used. According to ASHRAE-55 2010 standard, there are three methods for estimating clothing insulation using the tables provided.

- If the ensemble in question matches reasonably well with one on Table 1, the indicated value of intrinsic clothing insulation can be used;
- It is acceptable to add or subtract garments on Table 2 from the ensembles in Table 1 to estimate the insulation of ensembles that differ in garment composition;
- It is possible to define a complete clothing ensemble as a combination of individual garments using Table 2.

Another unit that is used is the "tog":

1 tog = 0.1 K·m^{2}·W^{−1} ≈ 0.645 clo
1 clo = 1.55 togs

The name comes from the word "togs", British slang for clothes.

== Clothing ensembles and garments ==
Table 1 – Typical insulation for clothing ensembles
| Ensemble description | I_{cl} (clo) |
|---|---|
| Walking shorts, short-sleeved shirt | 0.36 |
| Trousers, short-sleeved shirt | 0.57 |
| Trousers, long-sleeved shirt | 0.61 |
| Same as above, plus suit jacket | 0.96 |
| Same as above, plus vest and T-shirt | 0.96 |
| Trousers, long-sleeved shirt, long-sleeved sweater, T-shirt | 1.01 |
| Same as above, plus suit jacket and long underwear bottoms | 1.30 |
| Sweat pants, sweat shirt | 0.74 |
| Long-sleeved pajama top, long pajama trousers, short 3/4 sleeved robe, slippers (no socks) | 0.96 |
| Knee-length skirt, short-sleeved shirt, panty hose, sandals | 0.54 |
| Knee-length skirt, long-sleeved shirt, full slip, panty hose | 0.67 |
| Knee-length skirt, long-sleeved shirt, half slip, panty hose, long-sleeved sweater | 1.10 |
| Knee-length skirt, long-sleeved shirt, half slip, panty hose, suit jacket | 1.04 |
| Ankle-length skirt, long-sleeved shirt, suit jacket, panty hose | 1.10 |
| Long-sleeved coveralls, T-shirt | 0.72 |
| Overalls, long-sleeved shirt, T-shirt | 0.89 |
| Insulated coveralls, long-sleeved thermal underwear, long underwear bottoms | 1.37 |

Table 2 – Garment insulation
| Garment description | I_{cl} (clo) | Garment description | I_{cl} (clo) |
|---|---|---|---|
| Underwear | | Dresses and skirts | |
| Bra | 0.01 | Skirt (thin) | 0.14 |
| Panties | 0.03 | Skirt (thick) | 0.23 |
| Men's briefs | 0.04 | Sleeveless, scoop neck (thin) | 0.23 |
| T-shirt | 0.08 | Sleeveless, scoop neck (thick), i.e., jumper | 0.27 |
| Half-slip | 0.14 | Short-sleeve shirtdress (thin) | 0.29 |
| Long underwear bottoms | 0.15 | Long-sleeve shirtdress (thin) | 0.33 |
| Full slip | 0.16 | Long-sleeve shirtdress (thick) | 0.47 |
| Long underwear top | 0.20 | | |
| Footwear | | Sweaters | |
| Ankle-length athletic socks | 0.02 | Sleeveless vest (thin) | 0.13 |
| Pantyhose/stockings | 0.02 | Sleeveless vest (thick) | 0.22 |
| Sandals/thongs | 0.02 | Long-sleeve (thin) | 0.25 |
| Shoes | 0.02 | Long-sleeve (thick) | 0.36 |
| Slippers (quilted, pile lined) | 0.03 | | |
| Calf-length socks | 0.03 | Suit jackets and waistcoasts (lined) | |
| Knee socks (thick) | 0.06 | Sleeveless vest (thin) | 0.10 |
| Boots | 0.10 | Sleeveless vest (thick) | 0.17 |
| Shirts and blouses | | Single-breasted (thin) | 0.36 |
| Sleeveless/scoop-neck blouse | 0.12 | Single-breasted (thick) | 0.44 |
| Short-sleeve knit sport shirt | 0.17 | Double-breasted (thin) | 0.42 |
| Short-sleeve dress shirt | 0.19 | Double-breasted (thick) | 0.48 |
| Long-sleeve dress shirt | 0.25 | | |
| Long-sleeve flannel shirt | 0.34 | Sleepwear and Robes | |
| Long-sleeve sweatshirt | 0.34 | Sleeveless short gown (thin) | 0.18 |
| Trousers and coveralls | | Sleeveless long gown (thin) | 0.20 |
| Short shorts | 0.06 | Short-sleeve hospital gown | 0.31 |
| Walking shorts | 0.08 | Short-sleeve short robe (thin) | 0.34 |
| Straight trousers (thin) | 0.15 | Short-sleeve pajamas (thin) | 0.42 |
| Straight trousers (thick) | 0.24 | Long-sleeve long gown (thick) | 0.46 |
| Sweatpants | 0.28 | Long-sleeve short wrap robe (thick) | 0.48 |
| Overalls | 0.30 | Long-sleeve pajamas (thick) | 0.57 |
| Coveralls | 0.49 | Long-sleeve long wrap robe (thick) | 0.69 |

Icl is intrinsic clo, which is the clo of the garment * the percent of body surface area covered by that garment. Thus, you can add up the intrinsic clo of all the garments and get the total clo of your body.

== Clothing Insulation for Outdoors ==
The above applies more to clothing worn indoors. It references the ASHRAE handbook which is used to design HVAC systems for indoor spaces. Outdoors the temperature range is much larger, and the exertion level range can be much higher so clothing is different.

When it's cold, if the skin temperature gets below 30 C (86 F) the human will be uncomfortable. The goal of clothing insulation is to keep the skin temperature at that temperature or above. Comfort

The skin temperature can be determined using the differential form of Fourier's Law (Thermal conduction).

q = - k · $\nabla$T

where (including the SI units)

q is the local heat flux, W / m2
k is the material's conductivity, W/(m·K),
$\nabla T$ is the temperature gradient, K/m.

Doing a little algebra we can reformulate.

k = width / R

where

width is the thickness of the insulation
R is the R value of the insulation in m2K/W

and

$\nabla$T = $\Delta$T / width

where

$\Delta$T is the temperature difference across the insulation

substituting k and $\nabla$ T and reordering

$\Delta$ T = q * R

The heat flux (q) of the human body is (Metabolic equivalent of task)

q = 58.2 W/m2 · MET

where MET is the exertion level.

Table 3 – MET for different exertion levels
| Exertion Level | MET |
|---|---|
| sleeping | 0.8 |
| Standing around | 1.5 |
| Walking at 3 MPH (4.8 km/h) | 3 |
| Running at 5.6 MPH (9.0 km/h) | 8.8 |

Now we can figure out if we'll be warm. We know the temperature of the skin when we're just barely warm (30 C = 86 F). If the ambient temperature is greater than (skin temperature - $\Delta$ T), then we'll be warm.

This approach is simplistic due to modeling complexity. Different parts of the body exhibit varying heat flux, skin temperature, and insulation. Averaging over the entire body yields a close approximation. Wind, radiant heat loss, and humidity also influence these factors, permitting general conclusions.

R value of different insulations

Table 4 – Garment insulation
| Example | Type | Clo | Rus | R |
|---|---|---|---|---|
| MH Monkeyman | fleece | 1.11 | 0.97 | 0.171 |
| MB Thermawrap | synthetic batting | 2.04 | 1.80 | 0.317 |
| MB UL Down | light down | 2.72 | 2.40 | 0.422 |
| Brooks Range Mojave | medium down | 6.83 | 6.01 | 1.059 |
| MB light down parka | heavy down | 11.15 | 9.81 | 1.728 |

Clo is the unit of insulation used by the clothing industry. 1 Clo is nominally what a person wears in an office, a suit outfit. As used earlier in this article.
Rus is the U.S. unit for insulation (Fft2h/BTU)
R is the metric unit for insulation (m2K/W) as used in the formulas above

Now, we can look at a number of cases. First, consider the lightest insulation from that table, fleece, at different exertion levels. Calculate the minimum comfort temperature using the formula above:

Table 5 – Minimum comfort temperature at different exertion levels
| Insulation type | Exertion level (MET) | F | C |
|---|---|---|---|
| fleece | 0.8 | 72 | 22 |
| fleece | 1.5 | 59 | 15 |
| fleece | 3 | 32 | 0 |
| fleece | 8.8 | -72 | -58 |

For example, wearing fleece, when sleeping (MET = 0.8), the minimum temperature where you'll be comfortable is 72 F (22 C). You would have to wear this all over your body.

You can see that at high exertion levels, even light insulation is warm down to very cold temperatures. The result for this cold is inaccurate - the assumptions about equal coverage over the entire body, wind, radiant heat loss, and humidity are too great, but it gives a general idea.

There is a useful strategy that comes from this. If you're cold, increase your exertion level.

Next, consider a number of different insulations at a low exertion level:

Table 6 – Minimum comfort temperature with different insulations
| Insulation type | Exertion level (MET) | F | C |
|---|---|---|---|
| fleece | 1.5 | 59 | 15 |
| synthetic batting | 1.5 | 36 | 2 |
| light down | 1.5 | 20 | -7 |
| medium down | 1.5 | -80 | -63 |
| heavy down | 1.5 | -186 | -121 |

For example, wearing fleece, standing around (MET = 1.5), the minimum temperature where you'll be comfortable is 59 F (15 C).

Again, the results for the coldest cases are inaccurate - the assumptions about equal coverage over the entire body, wind, radiant heat loss, and humidity are too great, but it gives a general idea. If you had the heavy insulation over your entire body, you could survive very cold temperatures. It's important to have insulation over your head. Conventional wisdom is "if you want to keep warm, put a hat on".

== See also ==
- Comfort – Sense of physical or psychological ease
- Clothing – Objects worn to cover the body
- Exposure suit – Clothing to protect against an extreme environment
- Wind chill – Lowering of body temperature due to the passing flow of lower-temperature air
