= Tog (unit) =

Measure of thermal insulance

The tog is a measure of thermal insulance of a unit area, also known as thermal resistance. It is commonly used in the textile industry and often seen quoted on household items such as duvets, sleeping bags and carpet underlay.

== Origin ==
F. T. Peirce and W. H. Rees, of the Shirley Institute in Manchester, England, developed the tog in 1946 as a more convenient alternative to the SI unit m^{2}⋅K/W, writing in their paper The Transmission of Heat Through Textile Fabrics – part II:

The results given in this paper are expressed in terms of watts, °C and metres. So that practical clothing may be described conveniently by a range of small integers, the unit of thermal resistance, to be called the “tog”, is the resistance that will maintain a temperature difference of 0.1 °C. with a flux of 1 watt per square metre, or in more practical terms, 10 °C. with a flux of 1 watt per square decimetre.

Peirce and Rees do not give any explanation in their paper for their choice of the term "tog", nor its derivation. They do, however, refer to an earlier proposed unit, the "clo", coined by Gagge et al. in their 1941 paper A Practical System of Units for the Description of the Heat Exchange of Man with his Environment, writing "The conditions used to define the clo are unsatisfactory even for comparative physiological experiments." It is possible that Peirce and Rees chose "tog" as a three-letter term, mirroring "clo", based on the informal word "togs" meaning "clothing", which according to the Oxford English Dictionary is a contraction of the 19th century thieves' cant word togeman, cognate with toga, meaning "cloak or loose coat".

The Oxford English Dictionary gives no etymology for "tog" other than its definition by Peirce and Rees. According to Collins Dictionary, the unit "tog" is derived from "tog" meaning clothes. Chambers Dictionary states "Etymology: 1940s: perhaps from tog [as clothing]".

The backronym thermal overall grade is in common commercial use.

== Definition ==
The basic unit of insulation coefficient is the R_{SI}, (1 m^{2}⋅K/W), which compares to the tog with the relation 1 tog = 0.1 R_{SI}. There is also a US clothing unit, the clo, equivalent to 0.155 R_{SI} or 1.55 tog, described in ASTM D-1518.

A tog is 0.1 m^{2}⋅K/W. In other words, the thermal resistance in togs is equal to ten times the temperature difference (in °C) between the two surfaces of a material, when the flow of heat is equal to one watt per square metre.

== Examples of use ==
British duvets are sold in steps of 1.5 tog from 3.0 tog (summer) to 16.5 tog (extra-warm). The stated values are a minimum; actual values may be up to 3 tog higher. Also, these values assume that there is no added duvet cover that can trap air.

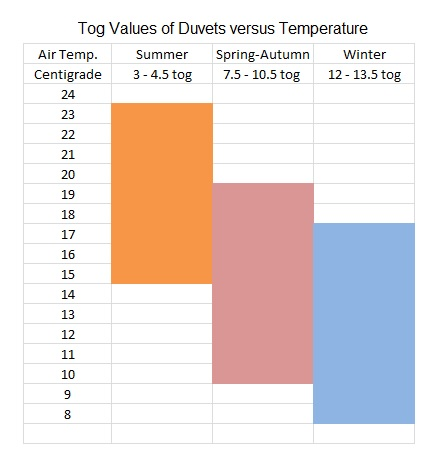
Adult comfort ratings against temperature.

Minimal	1.0–2.5 tog
Summer	3.0–4.5 tog
Spring/autumn	7.5–10.5 tog
Winter	12.0–13.5 tog

Some manufacturers have marketed combined duvet sets consisting of two duvets: one of approximately 4.5 tog and one of approximately 9.0 tog. These can be used individually as summer (4.5 tog) and spring/autumn (9.0 tog). When joined using press studs around the edges, or Velcro strips across each of the corners, they become a 13.5 tog winter duvet and as such can be made to suit all seasons.

== Testing ==
Launched in the 1940s by the Shirley Institute, the Shirley Togmeter is the standard apparatus for rating thermal resistance of textiles, commonly known as the Tog Test. This apparatus, described in BS 4745:2005 measures a sample of textile, either between two metal plates (for underclothing) or between a metal plate and free air (for outer layers). Each industry has its own specifications and methods for measuring thermal properties.

== See also ==
- Clothing insulation
