= Operative temperature =

Temperature for heat exchange

Operative temperature ($t_o$) is defined as a uniform temperature of an imaginary black enclosure in which an occupant would exchange the same amount of heat by radiation plus convection as in the actual nonuniform environment. Some references also use the terms 'equivalent temperature" or 'effective temperature' to describe combined effects of convective and radiant heat transfer. In design, operative temperature can be defined as the average of the mean radiant and ambient air temperatures, weighted by their respective heat transfer coefficients. The instrument used for assessing environmental thermal comfort in terms of operative temperature is called a eupatheoscope and was invented by A. F. Dufton in 1929. Mathematically, operative temperature can be shown as;

$t_o = \frac{(h_r t_{mr} + h_c t_a)}{ h_r + h_c}$

where,

$h_c$ = convective heat transfer coefficient
$h_r$ = linear radiative heat transfer coefficient
$t_a$ = air temperature
$t_{mr}$ = mean radiant temperature

Or

$t_o = \frac{(t_{mr} + (t_a \times \sqrt{10v}))}{ 1 + \sqrt{10v}}$

where,

$v$ = air velocity
$t_a$ and $t_{mr}$ have the same meaning as above.

It is also acceptable to approximate this relationship for occupants engaged in near sedentary physical activity (with metabolic rates between 1.0 met and 1.3 met), not in direct sunlight, and not exposed to air velocities greater than 0.10 m/s (20 fpm).

$t_o = \frac{(t_a + t_{mr})}{ 2 }$

where $t_a$ and $t_{mr}$ have the same meaning as above.

== Measurement ==
Operative temperature can be determined by combining measurements of air temperature and mean radiant temperature (MRT), weighted according to the convective and radiative heat-transfer coefficients at the occupant's location. Air temperature can be measured by using conventional temperature sensors, which should be shielded from surrounding radiation to avoid measurement errors. MRT is more difficult to determine because it depends on the radiant exchange between an occupant and the surrounding surfaces.

A common method for estimating MRT uses a globe thermometer, consisting of a temperature sensor enclosed within a hollow, matte-black sphere. The instrument measures globe temperature, which is influenced by both radiation and convection. MRT can then be estimated by using globe temperature, air temperature, air velocity, globe diameter, and surface emissivity.

The accuracy of globe thermometer measurements is influenced by instrument characteristics and environmental conditions. Conventional 150 mm globe thermometers can require approximately 20–30 minutes to reach thermal equilibrium following changes in the thermal environment, making them less suitable for rapidly changing conditions. Smaller globes respond faster but can introduce additional measurement uncertainties. Conventional corrections for convective heat transfer have been shown to systematically underestimate MRT under certain conditions.

MRT can also be estimated using simplified assumptions, such as treating it as equal to air temperature. However, different estimation methods and assumptions have been found to produce significant discrepancies compared with reference measurements in an office environment. These findings emphasize the importance of selecting appropriate measurement methods when determining operative temperature, especially in spaces with substantial differences between air and surrounding surface temperatures.

Errors in estimating MRT therefore propagate into the calculated operative temperature, particularly in environments where surrounding surfaces are much warmer or cooler than the air, because air temperature alone may not accurately represent the thermal conditions experienced by occupants.

== Application ==
Operative temperature is used in heat transfer and thermal comfort analysis in transportation and buildings. Most psychrometric charts used in HVAC design only show the dry bulb temperature on the x-axis(abscissa), however, it is the operative temperature which is specified on the x-axis of the psychrometric chart illustrated in ANSI/ASHRAE Standard 55 – Thermal Environmental Conditions for Human occupancy.

== See also ==
- HVAC
- Psychrometrics
- Underfloor heating
- ASHRAE
