= Thermal manikin =

Human model for testing thermal environments

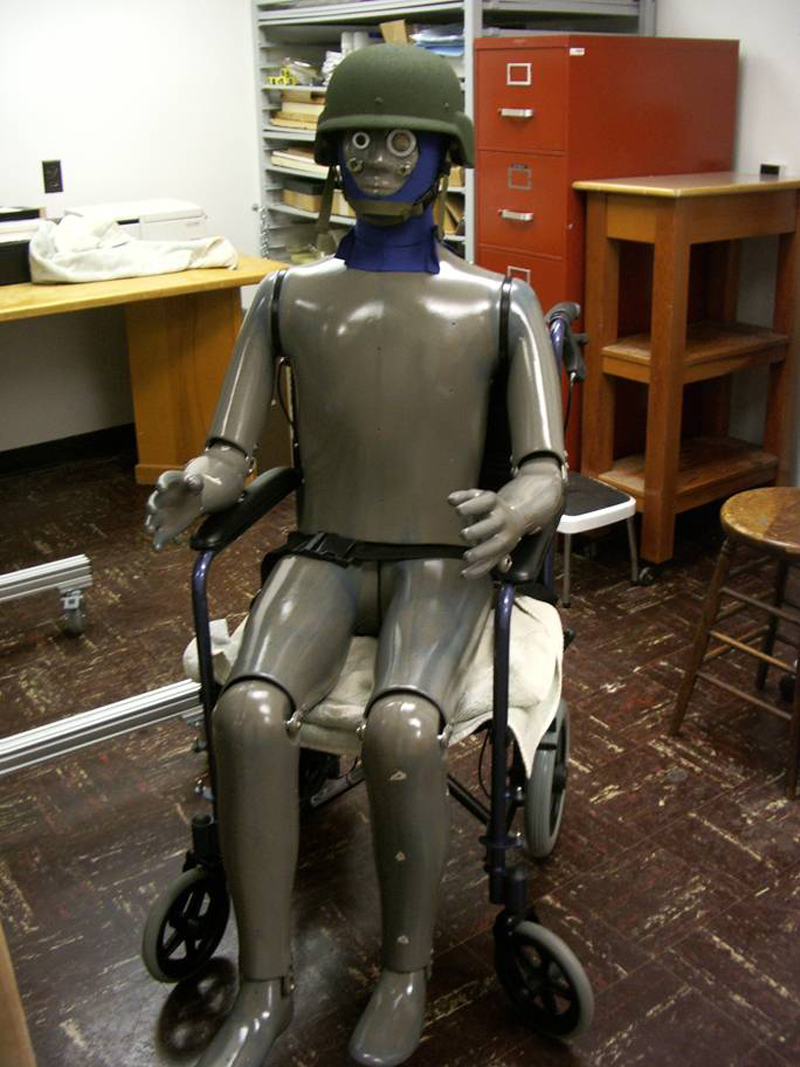
A thermal manikin being used to test helmet padding

The thermal manikin is a human model designed for scientific testing of thermal environments without the risk or inaccuracies inherent in human subject testing. Thermal manikins are primarily used in automotive, indoor environment, outdoor environment, military and clothing research. The first thermal manikins in the 1940s were developed by the US Army and consisted of one whole-body sampling zone. Modern-day manikins can have over 30 individually controlled zones. Each zone (right hand, pelvis, etc.) contains a heating element and temperature sensors within the “skin” of the manikin. This allows the control software to heat the manikin to a normal human body temperature, while logging the amount of power necessary to do so in each zone and the temperature of that zone.

== History ==
Clothing insulation is the thermal insulation provided by clothing and it is measured in clo. The measuring unit was developed in 1941. Shortly afterward, thermal manikins were developed by the US Army for the purposes of carrying out insulation measurements on the gear they were developing. The first thermal manikins were standing, made of copper, and were one segment, measuring whole-body heat loss. Over the years these were improved upon by various companies and individuals employing new technologies and techniques as understanding of thermal comfort increased. In the mid-1960s, seated and multi-segmented thermal manikins were developed, and digital regulation was employed, allowing for much more accurate power application and measurement. Over time breathing, sneezing, moving (such as continuous walking or biking motions) and sweating were all employed in the manikins, in addition to male, female, and child sizes depending on the application. Nowadays most manikins used for research purposes will have a minimum of 15 zones, and as many as 34 with options (often as a purchasable add-on to the base manikin) for sweating, breathing, and movement systems although simpler manikins are also in use in the clothing industry. Additionally, in the early 2000s several different computer models of manikins were developed in Hong Kong, the UK, and Sweden.

The following table gives an overview of different thermal manikin developments through the years:

Type	Material	Measurement Method	Adjustability	Development location and time
One-segment	Copper	Analogue	–	US 1945
Multi-segment	Aluminium	Analogue	–	UK 1964
Radiation manikin	Aluminium	Analogue	–	France 1972
Multi-segment	Plastics	Analogue	Movable	Denmark 1973
Multi-segment	Plastics	Analogue	Movable	Germany 1978
Multi-segment	Plastics	Digital	Movable	Sweden 1980
Multi-segment	Plastics	Digital	Movable	Sweden 1984
Fire manikin	Aluminium	Digital	–	US
Immersion manikin	Aluminium	Digital	Movable	Canada 1988
Sweating manikin	Aluminium	Digital	–	Japan 1988
Sweating manikin	Plastic	Digital	Movable	Finland 1988
Sweating manikin	Aluminium	Digital	Movable	USA 1996
Female manikin	Plastics	Digital, comfort regulation mode	Movable	Denmark 1989
Female manikin	Single wire	Digital, comfort regulation mode	Movable	Denmark 1989
Breathing thermal manikin	Plastics	Digital, comfort regulation mode	Movable, breathing simulation	Denmark 1996
Breathing thermal manikin	Single wire	Digital, comfort regulation mode	Movable, breathing simulation	Denmark 1996
Sweating manikin	Plastic	Digital, 30 dry and 125 sweat zones	Realistic movements	Switzerland 2001
Self-contained, sweating field manikin	Metal	Digital, 126 zones	Articulated	USA 2003
Virtual, computer manikin	Numerical, geometric model	Heat and mass transfer simulations	Articulated	China 2000
Virtual, computer manikin	Numerical, geometric model	Heat and mass transfer simulations	Articulated	UK 2001
Virtual, computer manikin	Numerical, geometric model	Heat and mass transfer simulations	Articulated	Sweden 2001
Virtual, computer manikin	Numerical, geometric model	Heat and mass transfer simulations	Articulated	Japan 2002
One-segment, sweating manikin	Breathable fabric	Digital, water heated	Movable	China 2001
One-segment manikin	Windproof fabric	Digital, air heated	Movable	USA 2003

== Design ==
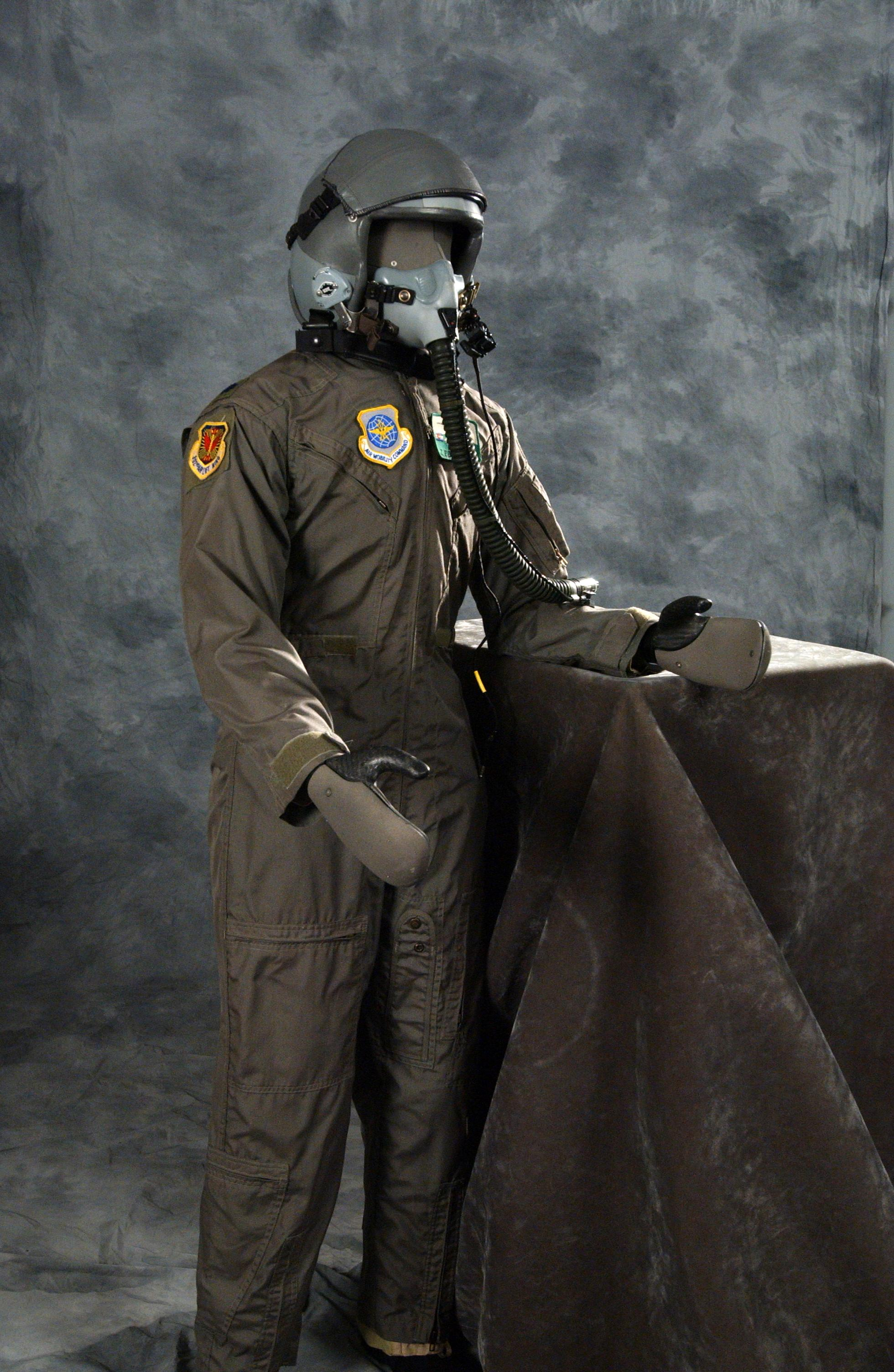
An automotive manikin used for testing comfort

Modern thermal manikins consist of three main elements, with optional additional add-ons. The exterior skin of the manikin may be made of fiberglass, polyester, carbon fiber, or other heat conducting materials, within which are temperature sensors in each measurement zone. Underneath the skin is the heating element. Each zone of a thermal manikin is designed to be heated as evenly as possible. To achieve this, wiring is coiled throughout the interior of the manikin with as few gaps as possible. Electricity is run through the wire to heat it, with the power use of each zone being separate controlled and recorded by the manikin control software. Finally, the manikins are designed to simulate humans as accurately as possible, and so any necessary additional mass is added to the interior of the manikin and distributed as needed. Additionally, manikins may be fitted with supplemental devices that mimic human actions such as breathing, walking, or sweating.

The heating element of thermal manikins may be set up in one of three locations within the manikin: at the outer surface, within the skin of the manikin, or in the interior of the manikin. The further inside the manikin the heating element is, the more stable the heat output at the skin surface will be, however the time constant of the manikin’s ability to respond to changes in the external environment will also rise as it will take longer for heat to penetrate through the system.

== Control ==
The amount of heat supplied to thermal manikins may be controlled in three ways. In “comfort mode” the PMV model equation found in ISO 7730 is applied to the manikin, and the controller software calculates the heat loss an average person would be comfortable undergoing within a given environment. This requires that the system know several basic facts about the manikin (surface area, hypothesized metabolic rate) while experimental factors must be input by the user (clothing insulation, Wet Bulb Globe Temperature). The second control method is constant heat flux from the manikin. That is, the manikin supplies a constant level of power, set by the user, and the skin temperature of the different segments is measured. The third method is that the skin temperature of the manikin is maintained constant at a user-specified value, while the power increases or decreases depending on the environmental conditions. This may arguably be considered a fourth method as well, as one can set the entire manikin to maintain the same temperature in all zones, or choose specific temperatures for each zone. Of these methods, the comfort mode is considered to be the most accurate representation of the actual heat distribution across the human body, while the heat flux mode is primarily used in high temperature settings (when room temperatures are likely to be above 34 °C).

== Calibration ==
=== Temperature sensors ===
To obtain the most accurate results possible it is necessary to calibrate the internal temperature sensors of the thermal manikin. A good calibration will use at least 2 temperature set points minimum 10 °C apart from one another. The manikin is set up in a thermally controlled environmental chamber so that the temperature of all its segments will be nearly identical to the operative temperature of the chamber. This means that the manikin must be unclothed and with minimal insulation between any body part and the air. A good system to achieve this is to have the manikin seated in an open chair (allowing air movement to pass through), with its feet propped up off the ground. Fans should be used to increase air movement in the chamber, ensuring constant mixing. This is acceptable for maintaining a constant temperature as there is no evaporative cooling without sweating or condensation (humidity should be low to ensure no condensation occurs). At each temperature set point the manikin will need to remain in the room for 3 to 6 hours in order to come to steady state conditions. Once equilibrium has been obtained a calibration point may be obtained for each body segment (this should be included in the control software).

=== Equivalent temperature ===
The most accurate method of evaluating how the environment is affecting the thermal manikin is by calculating the equivalent temperature of the environment, accounting for the effects of radiant heat, air temperature, and air movement. It is necessary to calibrate the manikin based on this before each experiment, as the factor to convert power output and manikin skin temperature to equivalent temperature (the heat transfer coefficient) changes slightly for each zone of the manikin and based on clothing the manikin is wearing. Calibration should be carried out in a thermally controlled chamber, where radiant and air temperatures are nearly identical, and minimal temperature variation occurs throughout the space. It is necessary that the manikin be wearing the same clothing as it will during experimental tests. Multiple calibration points must be taken, minimally spanning the range of temperatures that will be tested in the experiment. During calibration air movement should be kept as low as possible, and as much of the manikin’s surface should be exposed to air and radiant heat as possible, by placing it on supports that keep it in a seated position but do not block the back or legs as a traditional seat would. Manikin data should be recorded for each calibration point when the air, surface, and manikin temperatures have all reached steady state. Temperature of the “seat” should also be recorded, and data collection should not be stopped before the seat has reached a steady state temperature. To calculate the heat transfer coefficient (h_{cali}) the following equation is used:

h_{cali} = Q_{si}/(t_{ski} – t_{eq})

where:

- Q_{si} = the dry heat loss, or power, recorded by the manikin
- t_{ski} = the skin temperature of the manikin
- t_{eq} = the equivalent temperature of the room (the calibration temperature)

This factor may then be used to calculate equivalent temperature during further experiments in which radiant temperature and air velocity are not controlled using the equation:

t_{eq} = t_{ski} – Q_{si}/h_{cali}

== Setup ==
Posture, positioning, and clothing affect the thermal manikin measurements. With regard to posture, the most accurate method would be to have the manikin in precisely the same posture as it was calibrated in. Clothing affects heat transfer to the manikin and may add a layer of air insulation. Clothing reduces the effects of air velocity and changes the strength of the free convection flow around the body and face. Fitted clothing should be used if possible to decrease uncertainty of measurements as loose clothing is likely to change shape any time the manikin is moved.
