= Wet-bulb temperature =

Temperature of a thermometer covered by moist cloth

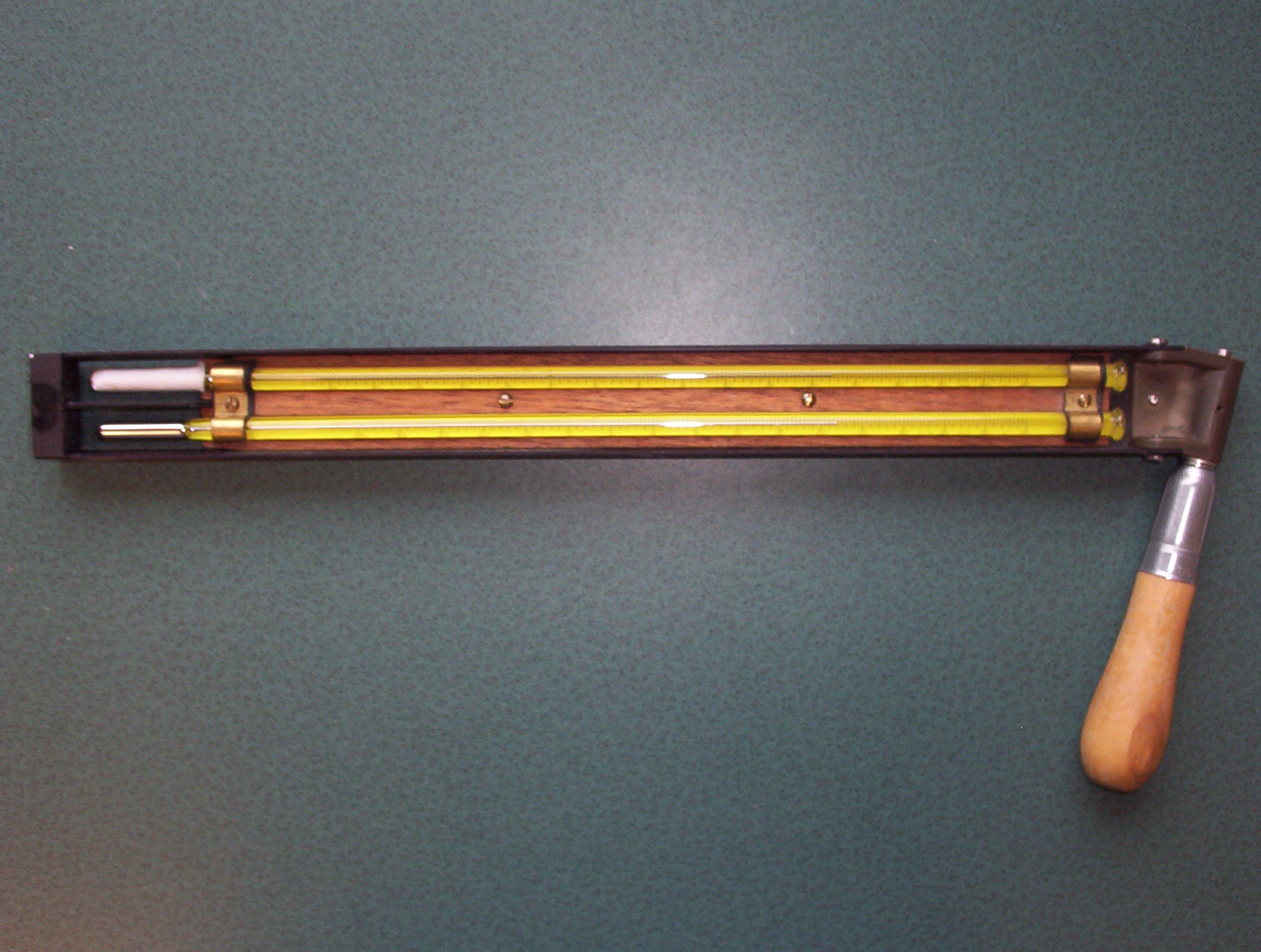
A sling psychrometer. The small fabric sock covering the bulb of the upper thermometer is wet with distilled water and whirled around for a minute or more before taking the "wet-bulb" thermometer's reading. The lower thermometer provides the "dry-bulb" temperature.

The wet-bulb temperature is the lowest temperature that can be reached by the evaporation of water under current ambient conditions. It combines humidity and temperature to better reflect heat stress on humans, as the body's ability to cool itself through sweating is reduced at higher humidity.

At 100% relative humidity, wet-bulb temperature is equal to air temperature, or dry-bulb temperature. At lower humidity, the wet-bulb temperature is lower than dry-bulb temperature due to evaporative cooling.

Wet-bulb temperature is formally defined as the temperature of a parcel of air cooled adiabatically to saturation (100% relative humidity) by the evaporation of water into it, with all latent heat supplied by the parcel. Wet-bulb temperature can be measured using a wet-bulb thermometer, such as in a psychrometer.

== Principles ==
If a thermometer's sensor (e.g. the bulb of a mercury thermometer) is wrapped in a water-moistened cloth, its temperature will depend on the humidity in addition to air temperature. The drier and less humid the air is, the faster the water will evaporate. The faster water evaporates, the lower the thermometer's temperature will be relative to air temperature.

Water can evaporate only if the air around it can absorb more water. This is measured by comparing how much water is in the air to the maximum that could be in the air—the relative humidity. 0% means the air is completely devoid of water, and 100% means the air contains all the water it can hold in the present circumstances and it cannot absorb any more water (from any source).

This is part of the cause of apparent temperature or 'feels like' temperature in humans. The drier the air, the more moisture it can take up beyond what is already in it, and the easier it is for extra water to evaporate. The result is that sweat evaporates more quickly in drier air, cooling down the skin faster. If the relative humidity is 100%, no water can evaporate, and cooling by sweating or evaporation is not possible.

When relative humidity is 100%, a wet-bulb thermometer can also no longer be cooled by evaporation, so it will read the same as an unwrapped thermometer.

The wet-bulb temperature is thus effectively the lowest temperature that may be achieved by evaporative cooling of a water-wetted, ventilated surface.

By contrast, the dew point is the temperature to which the ambient air must be cooled to reach 100% relative humidity assuming there is no further evaporation into the air; it is the temperature where condensation (dew) and clouds would form.

For a parcel of air that is less than saturated (i.e., air with less than 100 percent relative humidity), the wet-bulb temperature is lower than the dry-bulb temperature, but higher than the dew point temperature. The lower the relative humidity (the drier the air), the greater the gaps between each pair of these three temperatures. Conversely, when the relative humidity rises to 100%, the three figures coincide.

For air at a known pressure and dry-bulb temperature, the thermodynamic wet-bulb temperature corresponds to unique values of the relative humidity and the dew point temperature. It therefore may be used for the practical determination of these values. The relationships between these values are illustrated in a psychrometric chart.

Lower wet-bulb temperatures that correspond with drier air in summer can translate to energy savings in air-conditioned buildings due to:

1. Reduced dehumidification load for ventilation air
2. Increased efficiency of cooling towers
3. Increased efficiency of evaporative coolers

== Thermodynamic wet-bulb temperature ==
The thermodynamic wet-bulb temperature is the temperature a volume of air would have if cooled adiabatically to saturation by evaporation of water into it, all latent heat being supplied by the volume of air.

The temperature of an air sample that has passed over a large surface of liquid water in an insulated channel is the thermodynamic wet-bulb temperature—the air has become saturated by passing through a constant-pressure, ideal, adiabatic saturation chamber.

Meteorologists and others may use the term "isobaric wet-bulb temperature" to refer to the "thermodynamic wet-bulb temperature". It is also called the "adiabatic saturation temperature", though meteorologists also use "adiabatic saturation temperature" to mean "temperature at the saturation level", i.e. the temperature the parcel would achieve if it expanded adiabatically until saturated.

The thermodynamic wet-bulb temperature is a thermodynamic property of a mixture of air and water vapor. The value indicated by a simple wet-bulb thermometer often provides an adequate approximation of the thermodynamic wet-bulb temperature.

For an accurate wet-bulb thermometer, "the wet-bulb temperature and the adiabatic saturation temperature are approximately equal for air-water vapor mixtures at atmospheric temperature and pressure. This is not necessarily true at temperatures and pressures that deviate significantly from ordinary atmospheric conditions, or for other gas–vapor mixtures."

== Temperature reading of wet-bulb thermometer ==
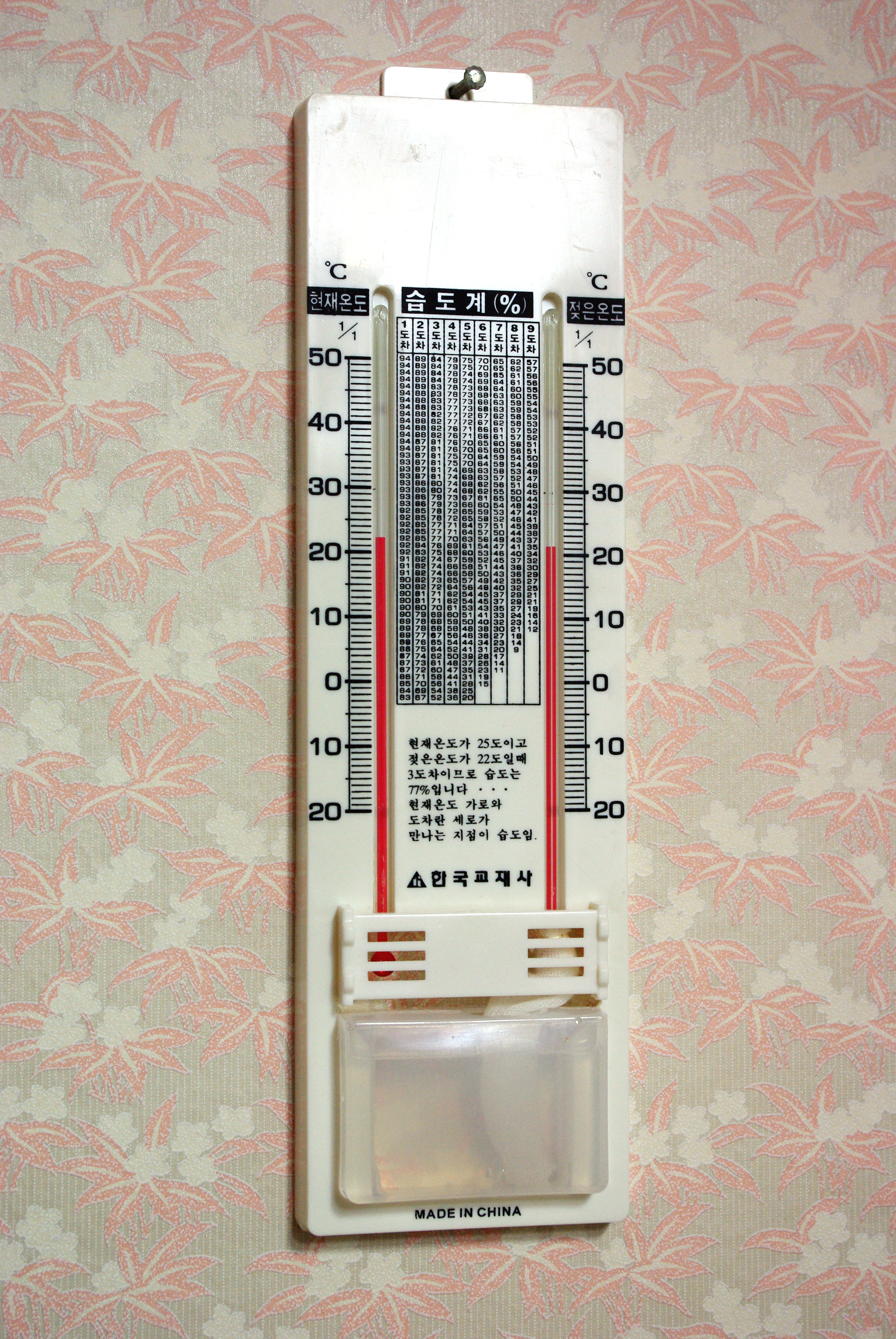
A wet-and-dry hygrometer featuring a wet-bulb thermometer

Wet-bulb temperature is measured using a thermometer that has its bulb wrapped in cloth—called a sock—that is kept wet with distilled water via wicking action. Such an instrument is called a wet-bulb thermometer. A widely used device for measuring wet- and dry-bulb temperature is a sling psychrometer, which consists of a pair of mercury bulb thermometers, one with a wet "sock" to measure the wet-bulb temperature and the other with the bulb exposed and dry for the dry-bulb temperature. The thermometers are attached to a swivelling handle, which allows them to be whirled around so that water evaporates from the sock and cools the wet bulb until it reaches thermal equilibrium.

An actual wet-bulb thermometer reads a temperature that is slightly different from the thermodynamic wet-bulb temperature, but they are very close in value. This is due to a coincidence: for a water-air system the psychrometric ratio (see below) happens to be close to 1, although for systems other than air and water they might not be close.

To understand why this is so, first consider the calculation of the thermodynamic wet-bulb temperature.

Experiment 1

In this case, a stream of unsaturated air is cooled. The heat from cooling that air is used to evaporate some water which increases the humidity of the air. At some point the air becomes saturated with water vapor (and has cooled to the thermodynamic wet-bulb temperature). In this case we can write the following balance of energy per mass of dry air:

$$(H_\mathrm{sat} - H_0) \cdot \lambda = (T_0 - T_\mathrm{sat}) \cdot c_\mathrm{s}$$

- $H_\mathrm{sat}$ saturated water content of the air (kg_{H_{2}O}/kg_{dry air})
- $H_0$ initial water content of the air (same unit as above)
- $\lambda$ latent heat of water (J/kg_{H_{2}O})
- $T_0$ initial air temperature (K)
- $T_\mathrm{sat}$ saturated air temperature (K)
- $c_s$ specific heat of air (J/kg·K)

Experiment 2

For the case of the wet-bulb thermometer, imagine a drop of water with unsaturated air blowing over it. As long as the vapor pressure of water in the drop (function of its temperature) is greater than the partial pressure of water vapor in the air stream, evaporation will take place. Initially, the heat required for the evaporation will come from the drop itself.

Instead, as the drop starts cooling, it is now colder than the air, so convective heat transfer begins to occur from the air to the drop. Furthermore, the evaporation rate depends on the difference of concentration of water vapor between the drop-stream interface and the distant stream (i.e. the "original" stream, unaffected by the drop), and on a convective mass transfer coefficient, which is a function of the components of the mixture (i.e. water and air).

After a certain period, an equilibrium is reached: the drop has cooled to a point where the rate of heat carried away in evaporation is equal to the heat gain through convection. At this point, the following balance of energy per interface area is true:

$$(H_\mathrm{sat} - H_0) \cdot \lambda \cdot k' = (T_0 - T_\mathrm{eq}) \cdot h_\mathrm{c}$$

- $H_\mathrm{sat}$ water content of interface at equilibrium (kg_{H_{2}O}/kg_{dry air}) (note that the air in this region is and has always been saturated)
- $H_0$ water content of the distant air (same unit as above)
- $k'$ mass transfer coefficient (kg/m^{2}⋅s)
- $T_0$ air temperature at distance (K)
- $T_\mathrm{eq}$ water drop temperature at equilibrium (K)
- $h_\mathrm{c}$ convective heat transfer coefficient (W/m^{2}·K)

Note that:

- $(H - H_0)$ is the driving force for mass transfer (constantly equal to $H_\mathrm{sat} - H_0$ throughout the entire experiment)
- $(T_0 - T)$ is the driving force for heat transfer (when $T$ reaches $T_\mathrm{eq}$, the equilibrium is reached)

Let us rearrange that equation into:

$$(H_\mathrm{sat} - H_0) \cdot \lambda = (T_0 - T_\mathrm{eq}) \cdot \frac{h_\mathrm{c}}{k'}$$

Now let's go back to our original "thermodynamic wet-bulb" experiment, Experiment 1. If the air stream is the same in both experiments (i.e. $H_0$ and $T_0$ are the same), then we can equate the right-hand sides of both equations:

$$(T_0 - T_\mathrm{sat}) \cdot c_\mathrm{s} = (T_0 - T_\mathrm{eq}) \cdot \frac{h_\mathrm{c}}{k'}$$

Rearranging:

$$T_0 - T_\mathrm{sat} = (T_0 - T_\mathrm{eq}) \cdot \frac{h_\mathrm{c}}{k' \cdot c_\mathrm{s}}$$

If $\dfrac{h_\mathrm{c}}{k' c_\mathrm{s}} = 1$ then the temperature of the drop in Experiment 2 is the same as the wet-bulb temperature in Experiment 1. Due to a coincidence, for the mixture of air and water vapor this is the case, the ratio (called psychrometric ratio) being close to 1.

Experiment 2 is what happens in a common wet-bulb thermometer, meaning that its reading is fairly close to the thermodynamic ("real") wet-bulb temperature.

Experimentally, the wet-bulb thermometer reads closest to the thermodynamic wet-bulb temperature if:

- The sock is shielded from radiant heat exchange with its surroundings
- Air flows past the sock quickly enough to prevent evaporated moisture from affecting evaporation from the sock
- The water supplied to the sock is at the same temperature as the thermodynamic wet-bulb temperature of the air

In practice the value reported by a wet-bulb thermometer differs slightly from the thermodynamic wet-bulb temperature because:

- The sock is not perfectly shielded from radiant heat exchange
- Air flow rate past the sock may be less than optimum
- The temperature of the water supplied to the sock is not controlled

At relative humidities below 100 percent, water evaporates from the bulb, cooling it below ambient temperature. To determine relative humidity, ambient temperature is measured using an ordinary thermometer, better known in this context as a dry-bulb thermometer. At any given ambient temperature, less relative humidity results in a greater difference between the dry-bulb and wet-bulb temperatures; the wet-bulb is colder. The precise relative humidity is determined by reading from a psychrometric chart of wet-bulb versus dry-bulb temperatures, or by calculation.

Psychrometers are instruments with both a wet-bulb and a dry-bulb thermometer.

A wet-bulb thermometer can also be used outdoors in sunlight in combination with a globe thermometer (which measures the incident radiant temperature) to calculate the wet-bulb globe temperature (WBGT).

== Adiabatic wet-bulb temperature ==
The adiabatic wet-bulb temperature is the temperature a volume of air would have if cooled adiabatically to saturation and then compressed adiabatically to the original pressure in a moist-adiabatic process. Such cooling may occur as air pressure reduces with altitude, as noted in the article on lifted condensation level.

This term, as defined in this article, may be most prevalent in meteorology.

As the value referred to as "thermodynamic wet-bulb temperature" is also achieved via an adiabatic process, some engineers and others may use the term "adiabatic wet-bulb temperature" to refer to the "thermodynamic wet-bulb temperature". As mentioned above, meteorologists and others may use the term "isobaric wet-bulb temperature" to refer to the "thermodynamic wet-bulb temperature".

"The relationship between the isobaric and adiabatic processes is quite obscure. Comparisons indicate, however, that the two temperatures are rarely different by more than a few tenths of a degree Celsius, and the adiabatic version is always the smaller of the two for unsaturated air. Since the difference is so small, it is usually neglected in practice."

== Wet-bulb depression ==
The wet-bulb depression is the difference between the dry-bulb temperature and the wet-bulb temperature. If there is 100% humidity, dry-bulb and wet-bulb temperatures are identical, making the wet-bulb depression equal to zero in such conditions.

== Wet-bulb temperature and health ==
Living organisms can survive only within a certain temperature range. When the ambient temperature is excessive, many animals cool themselves to below ambient temperature by evaporative cooling (sweat in humans and horses, saliva and water in dogs and other mammals); this helps to prevent potentially fatal hyperthermia due to heat stress. The effectiveness of evaporative cooling depends upon humidity; wet-bulb temperature, or more complex calculated quantities such as wet-bulb globe temperature (WBGT) which also takes account of solar radiation, give a useful indication of the degree of heat stress, and are used by several agencies as the basis for heat stress prevention guidelines.

Given the body's vital requirement to maintain a core temperature of approximately 37 °C (99 °F), a sustained wet-bulb temperature exceeding 35 °C (95 °F)—equivalent to a heat index of 71 °C (160 °F)— is likely to be fatal even to fit and healthy people, semi-nude in the shade and next to a fan; at this temperature human bodies switch from shedding heat to the environment, to gaining heat from it. A 2022 study found that the critical wet-bulb temperature at which heat stress can no longer be compensated in young, healthy adults mimicking basic activities of daily life strongly depended on the ambient temperature and humidity conditions, but was 5–10 °C (9–18 °F) below the theoretical limit.

A 2015 study concluded that depending on the extent of future global warming, parts of the world may become uninhabitable due to deadly wet-bulb temperatures as early as 2045. A 2020 study reported cases where a 35 °C (95 °F) wet-bulb temperature had already occurred, albeit too briefly and in too small a locality to cause fatalities. Severe mortality and morbidity impacts can occur at much lower wet-bulb temperatures due to suboptimal physiological and behavioral conditions; the 2003 European and 2010 Russian heat waves had values no greater than 28 °C (82 °F).

In 2018, South Carolina implemented new regulations to protect high school students from heat-related emergencies during outdoor activities. Specific guidelines and restrictions are in place for wet-bulb globe temperatures between 82.0 °F (27.8 °C) and 92.0 °F (33.3 °C); wet-bulb globe temperatures of 92.1 °F (33.4 °C) or greater require all outdoor activities to be canceled.

Wet-bulb temperature extremes (WTEs), as they are known, rarely exceed 2,000 square kilometers.

=== Heat waves with high humidity ===
- On 8 July 2003, Dhahran, Saudi Arabia, saw the highest heat index ever recorded at 81 °C (178 °F) with a temperature of 42 °C (108 °F) and a 35 °C (95 °F) dew point.
- The 2015 Indian heat wave saw wet-bulb temperatures in Andhra Pradesh reach 30 °C (86 °F). A similar wet-bulb temperature was reached during the 1995 Chicago heat wave.
- A heat wave in August 2015 saw temperatures of 48.6 °C (119.5 °F) and a dew point of 29.5 °C (85.1 °F) at Samawah, Iraq, and 46 °C (115 °F) with a dew point of 32 °C (90 °F) in Bandar-e Mahshahr, Iran. This implied wet-bulb temperatures of about 33.5 °C (92.3 °F) and 34.7 °C (94.5 °F) respectively. The government urged residents to stay out of the sun and drink plenty of water.

=== Highest recorded wet-bulb temperatures ===
The following locations have recorded wet-bulb temperatures of 34 °C (93 °F) or higher. (Weather stations are typically at airports, so other locations in the city may have experienced higher values.)

WT (°C)	City and state	Country
36.3	Ras Al Khaimah City, Ras Al Khaimah	UAE
36.2	Jacobabad, Sindh	Pakistan
36	Mecca	Saudi Arabia
35.8	Hisar, Haryana	India
35.6	Yannarie, Western Australia	Australia
35.4	Villahermosa, Tabasco	Mexico
35.1	[unnamed location], Khyber Pakhtunkhwa	Pakistan
35	Maracaibo	Venezuela
35	Matlapa, San Luis Potosi	Mexico
35	Choix, Sinaloa	Mexico
34.8	La Paz, Baja California Sur	Mexico
34.8	Soto la Marina, Tamaulipas	Mexico
34.7	Medina	Saudi Arabia
34.7	Bandar Abbas	Iran
34.6	Machilipatnam mandal, Andhra Pradesh	India
34.5	Balasore, Odisha	India
34.4	Bamako	Mali
34.4	Chicxulub, Yucatán	Mexico
34.1	Rangoon	Myanmar
34	Ajnala, Punjab	India
34	Port Hedland, Western Australia	Australia
34	Empalme, Sonora	Mexico
34	Tuxpan, Veracruz	Mexico
34	Paysandú Department	Uruguay

== Climate change ==
Study results indicate that limiting global warming to 1.5 °C would prevent most of the tropics from reaching the wet-bulb temperature of the human physiological limit of 35 °C.

== See also ==
- Atmospheric thermodynamics
- Wet-bulb potential temperature
