= Wet-bulb potential temperature =

Type of temperature measurement

Wet-bulb potential temperature, sometimes referred to as pseudo wet-bulb potential temperature, is the temperature that a parcel of air at any level would have if, starting at the wet-bulb temperature, it were brought at the saturated adiabatic lapse rate to the standard pressure of 1,000 mbar.

This temperature is conservative with respect to reversible adiabatic changes.

== See also ==
- Wet-bulb temperature
- Potential temperature
- Atmospheric thermodynamics
- Equivalent temperature
- Equivalent potential temperature
