= Dry-bulb temperature =

Temperature of air as measured by a thermometer shielded from radiation and moisture

The dry-bulb temperature (DBT) is the temperature of air measured by a thermometer freely exposed to the air, but shielded from radiation. The dry-bulb temperature is the temperature that is usually thought of as air temperature, and it is the true thermodynamic temperature. It is directly proportional to the mean kinetic energy of the air molecules. Temperature is usually measured in degrees Celsius (°C), Kelvin (K), or degrees Fahrenheit (°F). If expressed in kelvins, then the symbol is T_{a}, if expressed in Celsius or Fahrenheit, then the symbol is t_{a}. When measuring dry-bulb temperature, care should be taken to prevent the sensor from being subjected to radiation from neighbouring heat sources. To minimize the effects of radiation on the sensor, one could reduce the sensor's emission factor, or reduce the temperature difference between the sensor and the surrounding surfaces, or add a thin ventilated reflective screen.

Unlike wet-bulb temperature, dry-bulb temperature does not indicate the amount of moisture in the air (humidity). The dry-bulb temperature is one of the main inputs for thermal comfort calculations and it is also used for assessing the heat transfer by convection. The dry-bulb temperature is an important variable in psychrometrics, being the horizontal axis of a psychrometric chart.

== See also ==
- Psychrometric chart
- Hygrometer
- Atmospheric thermodynamics
