= Venticool =

Venticool is an international platform formed in 2012 focusing on ventilative cooling issues, with the overall goal to "boost awareness, communication, networking and steering research and development efforts in the field" . In 2020, venticool's focus was broadened towards resilient ventilative cooling.

According to Annex 80 ‘Resilient Cooling of Buildings’ research project of the ‘Energy in Buildings and Communities Programme (EBC)’ of the International Energy Agency (IEA), the resilience of a building is described as the “ability of the building to withstand disruptions caused by extreme weather events, man-made disasters, power failure, change in use and atypical conditions; and to maintain capacity to adapt, learn and transform”.

venticool supports better guidance, to appropriately implement in practice and enable adequate credit for resilient ventilative cooling strategies in national and international building regulations.

The platform's main activities include the organization of events: conferences, workshops and webinars, as well as the production of publications: papers, reports, guidebooks etc.

== History ==
The international platform for ventilative cooling- venticool was inaugurated in October 2012 during the 33rd AIVC Conference in Copenhagen. The platform is facilitated by the International Network for Information on Ventilation and Energy Performance- INIVE EEIG, which is a registered European Economic Interest Grouping (EEIG) whose members include building research centres in Europe. Since then, the platform has been financially and/or technically supported by its partners: AGORIA-naventa, Reynaers Aluminium, VELUX and WindowMaster.

== Collaborations ==
venticool also collaborates with organizations that hold significant experience and/or are well identified in the field of ventilation and thermal comfort, such as the IEA-EBC's Annex 5: AIVC, which aims to provide reliable reference information on research and development in the fields of air infiltration and ventilation, the Active House Alliance, CIBSE nvg, REHVA, EuroWindoor AISBL and others.

venticool was the key partner in the communication and dissemination activities of the Annex 62 ‘ventilative cooling’ research project of the ‘Energy in Buildings and Communities Programme (EBC)’ of the International Energy Agency (IEA), an international collaborative project on ventilative cooling with a four-year working phase (2014–2018). The main aim of Annex 62 was to make ventilative cooling an attractive and energy efficient cooling solution to avoid overheating in both new and renovated buildings.

Currently, venticool is the main dissemination partner of IEA-EBC “Annex 80 Resilient Cooling of Buildings” which runs from 2018 to 2023, with the main objective to “support a rapid transition to an environment where resilient low energy and low carbon cooling systems are the mainstream and preferred solutions for cooling and overheating issues in buildings”.

venticool is also dissemination partner of IEA-EBC "Annex 87 Energy and Indoor Environmental Quality Performance of Personalised Environmental Control Systems (PECS) running from 2021 to 2026 aiming to “establish design criteria and operation guidelines for PECS and to quantify the benefits regarding health, comfort and energy performance”.

== Target group ==
The target group of venticool ranges from European, national and regional government policy makers, stakeholders’ organizations, designers, consultants, builders, building owners, HVAC installers to research and technical centres.

== Newsletter ==
venticool publishes a newsletter twice a year with information on the latest developments on resilient ventilative cooling including policy issues, events, innovative concepts, standardization, case studies and research activities.

== Events ==
Annual Conference. Since 2013, venticool holds a joint annual conference together with the Air Infiltration and Ventilation Centre and the TightVent Europe platform in September/October in one of the AIVC participating countries, with a track devoted to (resilient) ventilative cooling.

At the 2012 AIVC Conference (the official launch of the platform), the following topical sessions were organized:

- International initiatives on ventilative cooling
- Ventilative cooling in residences
- Advanced ventilative cooling concepts in Nearly Zero-Energy Buildings
- Ventilative cooling in building regulations

At the 2013 conference, the following topical sessions were organised:

- Ventilative cooling in standards and regulations - Challenges for Annex 62
- Active House – Buildings combining comfort, energy and sustainability

At the 2014 conference, the following topical sessions were organised:

- Ventilative cooling and Annex 62
- Comfort in sustainable buildings

At the 2015 conference, the following topical sessions were organised:

- Ventilative cooling and Annex 62 (Part 1)
- Ventilative cooling and Annex 62 (Part 2)

At the 2017 conference, the following topical sessions were organized:

- IEA-EBC Annex 62: Ventilative Cooling: Lessons learnt from case-studies
- IEA-EBC Annex 62: Ventilative Cooling: Strategies and components

At the 2018 conference, the following topical sessions were organized:

- IEA-EBC Annex 62: Ventilative Cooling
- Improving the efficiency of ventilative cooling

At the 2019 conference, the following topical sessions were organized:

- Better implementation of ventilative cooling in national building standards, legislation and compliance tools
- EBC Annex 80- Resilient Cooling

At the 2022 conference, the following topical sessions were organized:

- Resilient Cooling in a Changing Climate
- Ventilative cooling to reduce overheating in buildings in ventilation related standards and legislation in the context of well-being, sustainability and energy
- New IEA EBC Annex 87 on Personalized Environmental Control Systems (PECS)

Workshops & Webinars. venticool also organizes workshops and webinars focused on specific topics in relevance to (resilient) ventilative cooling and/or current work developed by the IEA EBC Annex 80.
