= Repurposing =

Using object intended for one purpose in alternative way

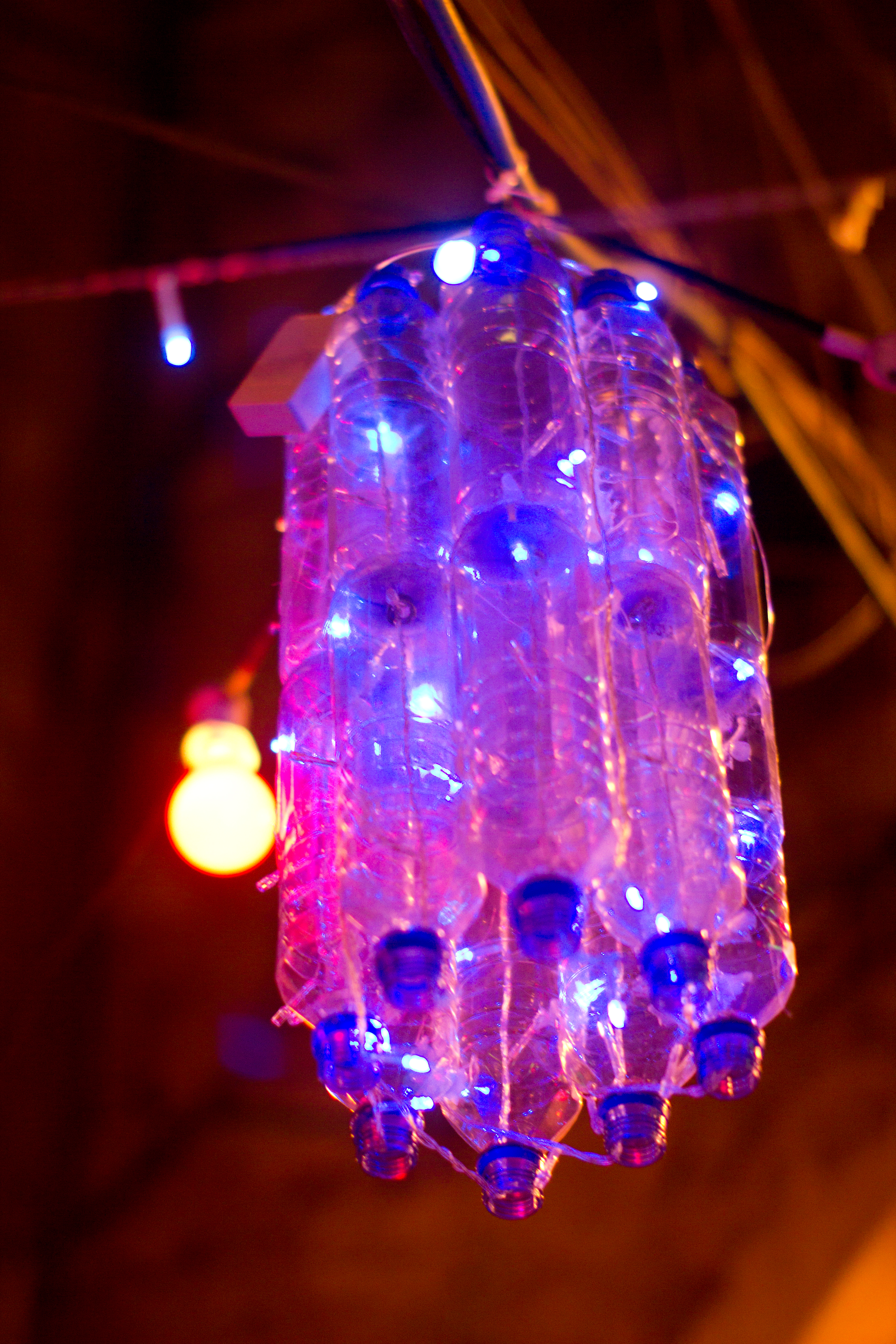
Plastic bottles (with LED lights) repurposed as a chandelier during Ramadan in the Muslim Quarter, Jerusalem

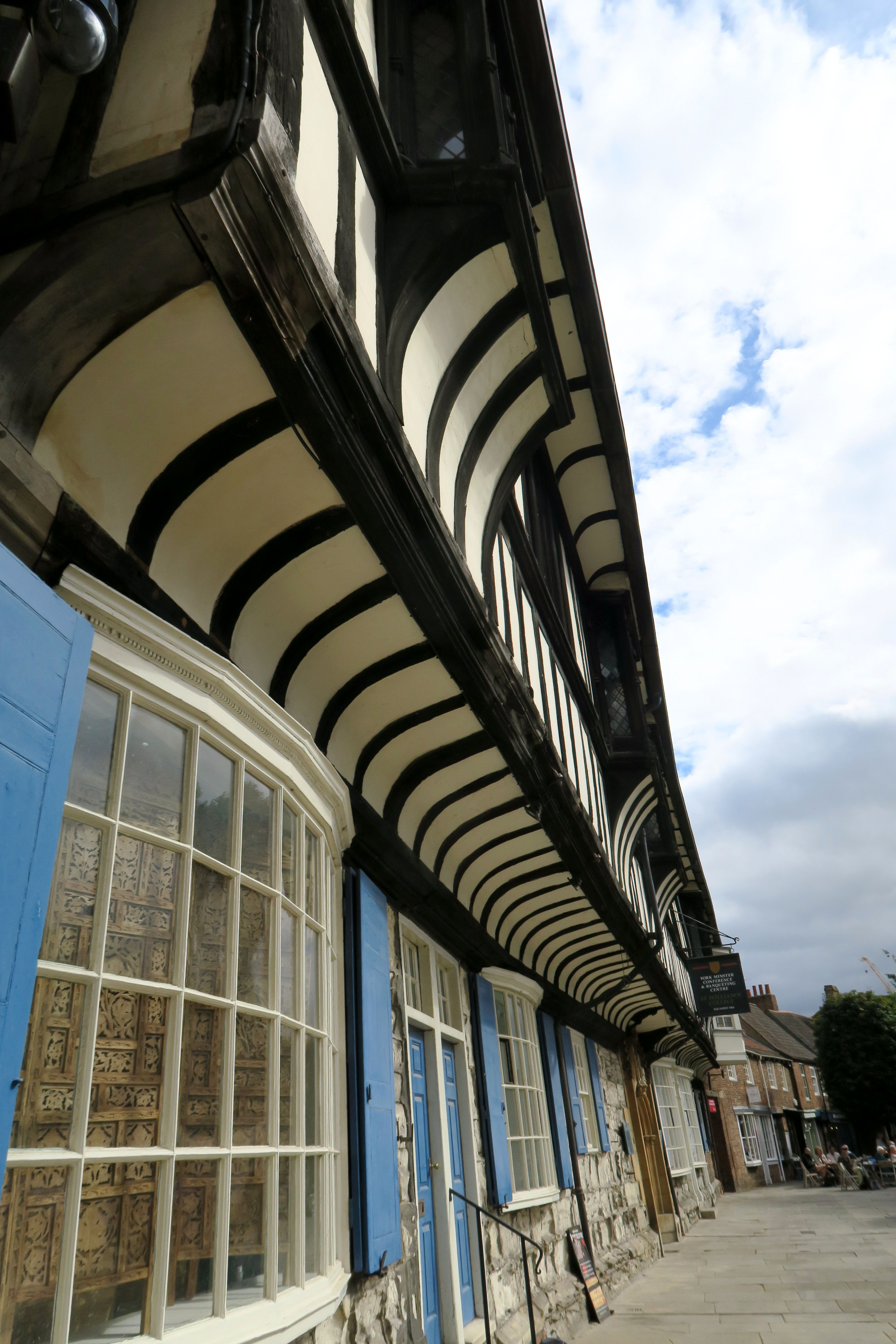
St William's College (York) facade. The curved wood protrusions are probably repurposed ship frames.

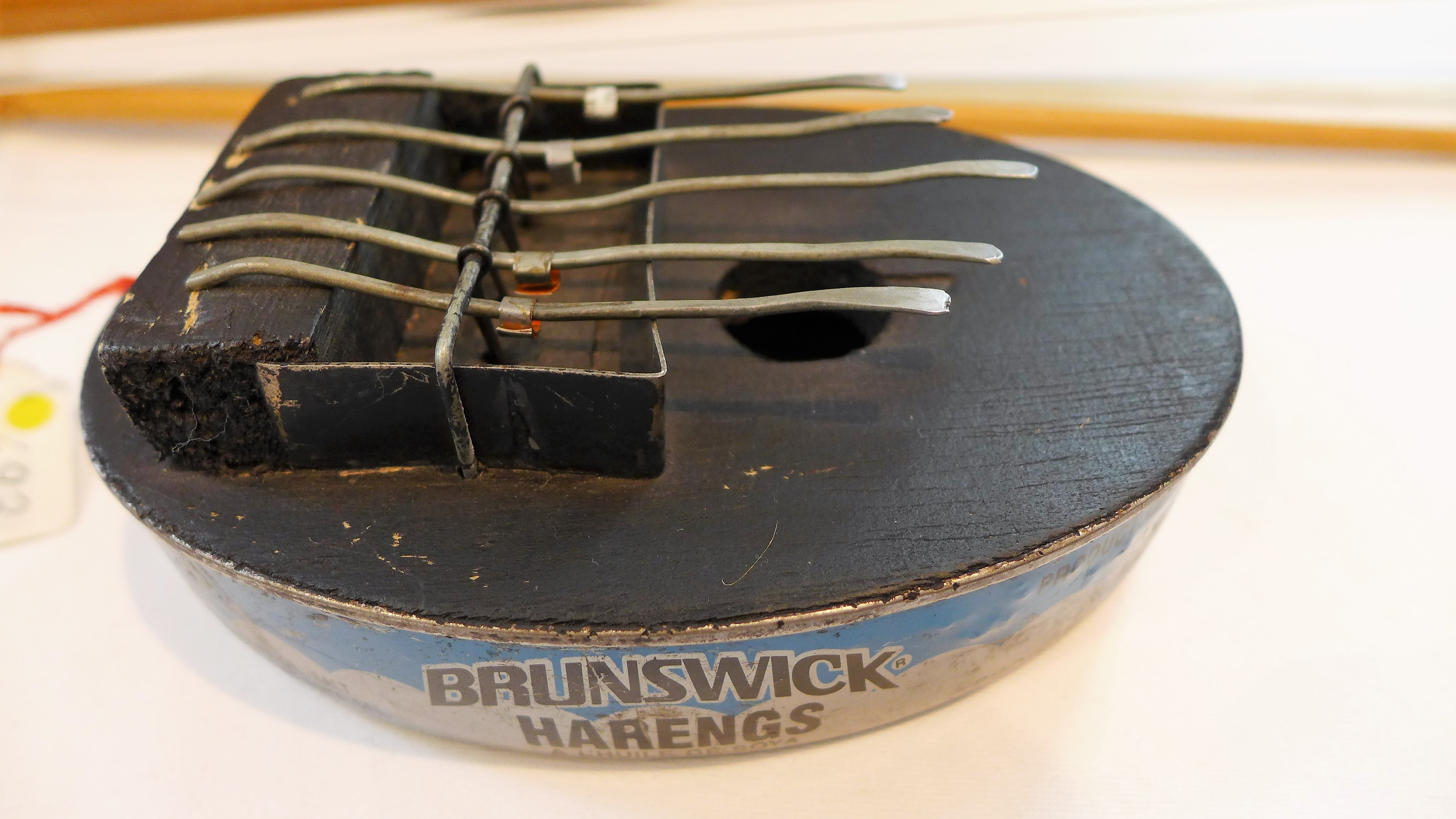
African music instrument made from a food can

Repurposing is the process by which an object with one use value is transformed or redeployed as an object with an alternative use value.

== Description ==
Repurposing is as old as human civilization, with many contemporary scholars investigating how different societies re-appropriate the artifacts of older cultures in new and creative ways. More recently, repurposing has been celebrated by 21st century hobbyists and arts-and-crafts organizations such as Instructables and other Maker culture communities as a means of creatively responding to the ecological and economic crises of the 21st century. Recent scholarship has attempted to relate these activities to American left- and right-libertarianism.

Repurposing is the use of a tool being re-channeled into being another tool, usually for a purpose unintended by the original tool-maker. Typically, repurposing is done using items usually considered to be junk, garbage, or obsolete. A good example of this would be the Earthship style of house, that uses tires as insulating walls and bottles as glass walls. Reuse is not limited to repeated uses for the same purpose. Examples of repurposing include using tires as boat fenders and steel drums or plastic drums as feeding troughs and/or composting bins. Incinerator and power plant exhaust stack fly-ash is used extensively as an additive to concrete, providing increased strength. This type of reuse can sometimes make use of items which are no longer usable for their original purposes, for example using worn-out clothes as rags.

== Examples ==
External videos
- REUSE! Because You Can't Recycle the Planet (Official Full Documentary), Alex Eaves

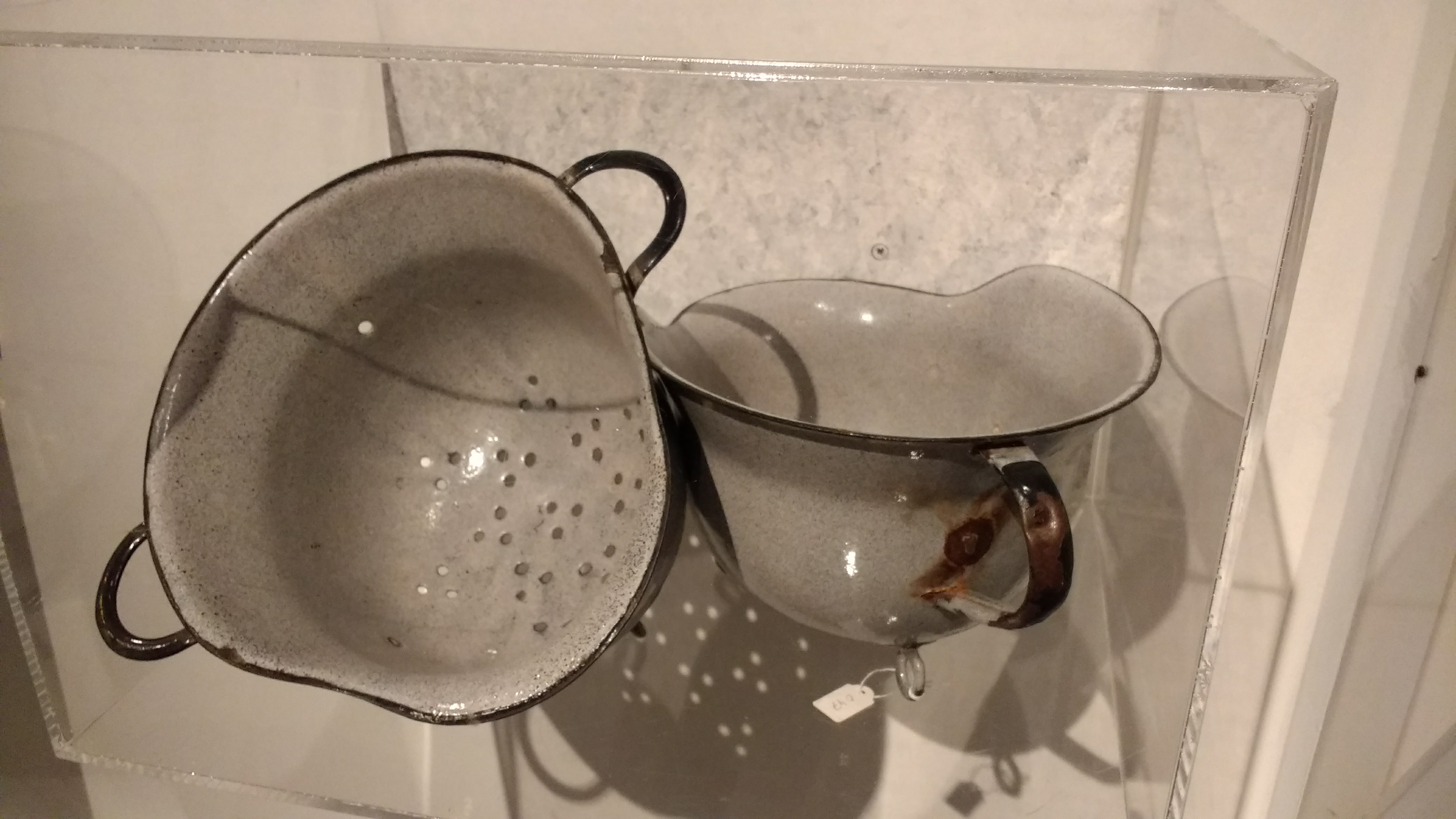
German military helmets converted into a chamber pot and a strainer after World War II. Exhibits in the Resistance Museum, Amsterdam.

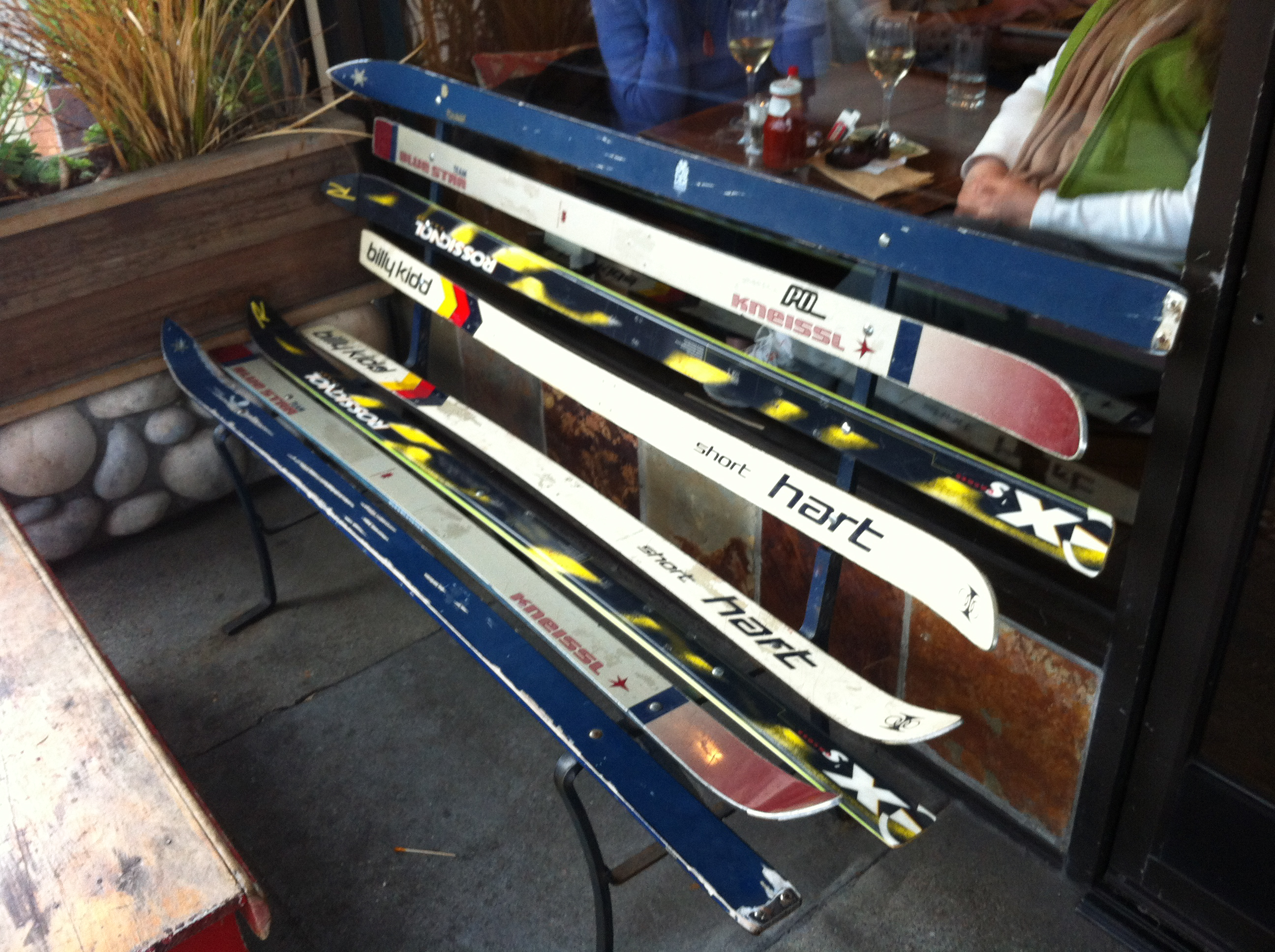
Skis repurposed as a bench

=== Art ===
- Appropriation (art) is the repurposing of pre-existing objects or images with little or no transformation applied to them. The use of appropriation has played a significant role in the history of the arts (audiovisual, literary, musical and performing arts). In the audiovisual arts, to appropriate means to properly adopt, borrow, recycle or sample aspects (or the entire form) of human-made audiovisual culture. Notable in this respect are the Readymades of Marcel Duchamp and sampling in Hip Hop music.
- Steelpan drums are created from oil drums

=== Automobiles ===
- Full-size vans from the Big Three which have been used for airport shuttle service have been repurposed as church vans mainly because of some depreciation to facilitate affordable cost for thrifty church groups.

=== Electronics ===
- A USB dead drop can be mounted on a brick wall since this gives an opportunity to repurpose older USB flash drives with obsolete capacities to continue service for file transfer (especially anonymous ones) that don't demand more than one gigabyte.
- Everdrive and other flash video game cartridges have offered opportunities to download ROM images of video game cartridges onto SD cards while offering opportunities to repurpose real vintage video game consoles for retro gameplay.
- Old Android smartphones, which tend to have little computing resources yet which are unused and probably contain a triaxial accelerometer of decent specifications, can be used as an amateur seismograph node for a distributed seismography project, e.g., Quake-Catcher Network.
- Discarded or new consumer COTS surplus parabolic reflectors intended for use for C band satellite TV reception can be repurposed for a wide gamut of applications for which a consumer-grade reflector of low gain is adequate, incl. amateur microwave SETI (mainly Project Argus), Wi-Fi links, and microwave amateur radio radio beacons.

=== As a tactic for manufacturing goods ===
- Right-hand-drive Jeep brand vehicles, such as the Jeep Wrangler, which are initially slated for import to right-hand-drive countries, have had some specially designed versions repurposed for US and Canada postal service mail carrying, in which this tactic of repurposing can consolidate the overhead of retooling for specialty manufacturing of the vehicle.

=== Manufacturing of recycled goods ===
- Reusable packaging can be reused for a wide variety of other purposes.
- Recycling can also involve repurposing of materials, such as products using recycled paper.

=== Drugs ===
- Drug repositioning (also known as "drug repurposing" or "therapeutic switching") is the application of known drugs and compounds to treat new diseases. Examples include Pfizer's Viagra for erectile dysfunction and Celgene's thalidomide for cancer.
- Off-label use
- old pill bottles can sometimes be repurposed as "tupperware" for small items outside of the category of pharmaceutical pills.

=== Real property ===
- Real estate, including land and buildings, is routinely adaptive reused for other purposes, both short-term and long-term, due to its high fixed cost. An example is conversion of old industrial mills.

=== Scrap and household materials ===
- Scrap metal has countless applications for repurposing.
- Furniture has countless applications for repurposing.
- Kitchen utensils have many unique repurposing opportunities.
- Beverage-can stove, a do-it-yourself, ultralight, alcohol-burning portable stove, made using parts from two aluminium beverage cans.
- Beverage bottles: Water bottles may be repurposed for solar water disinfection. Wat Pa Maha Chedi Kaew is a Buddhist temple in Thailand made from one million discarded beer bottles.
- Pallet crafts, crafts and projects which use discarded wooden shipping pallets.
- Removed house parts, like doors, also have countless potential repurposing applications.
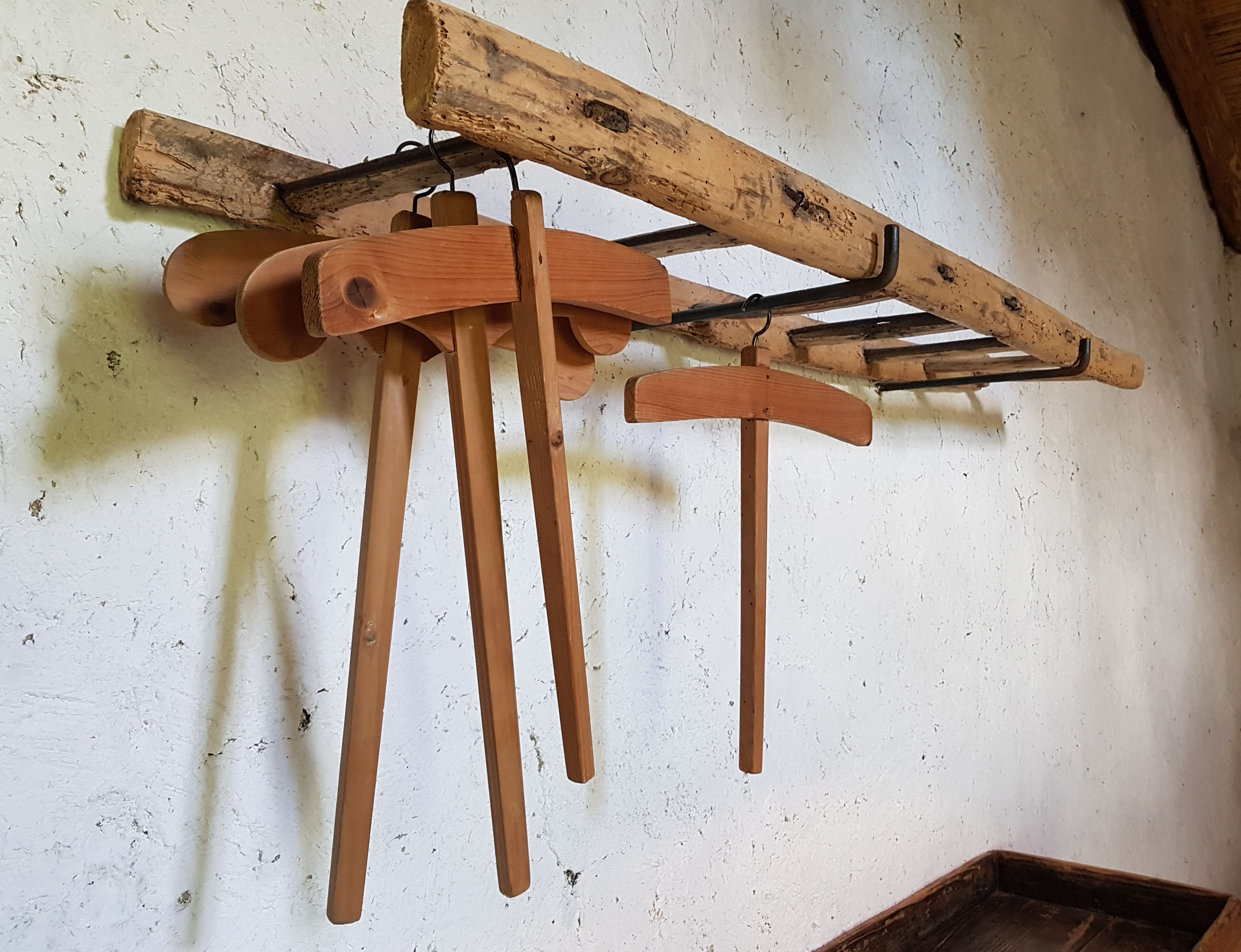
A ladder repurposed as a coat rack in Sardinia

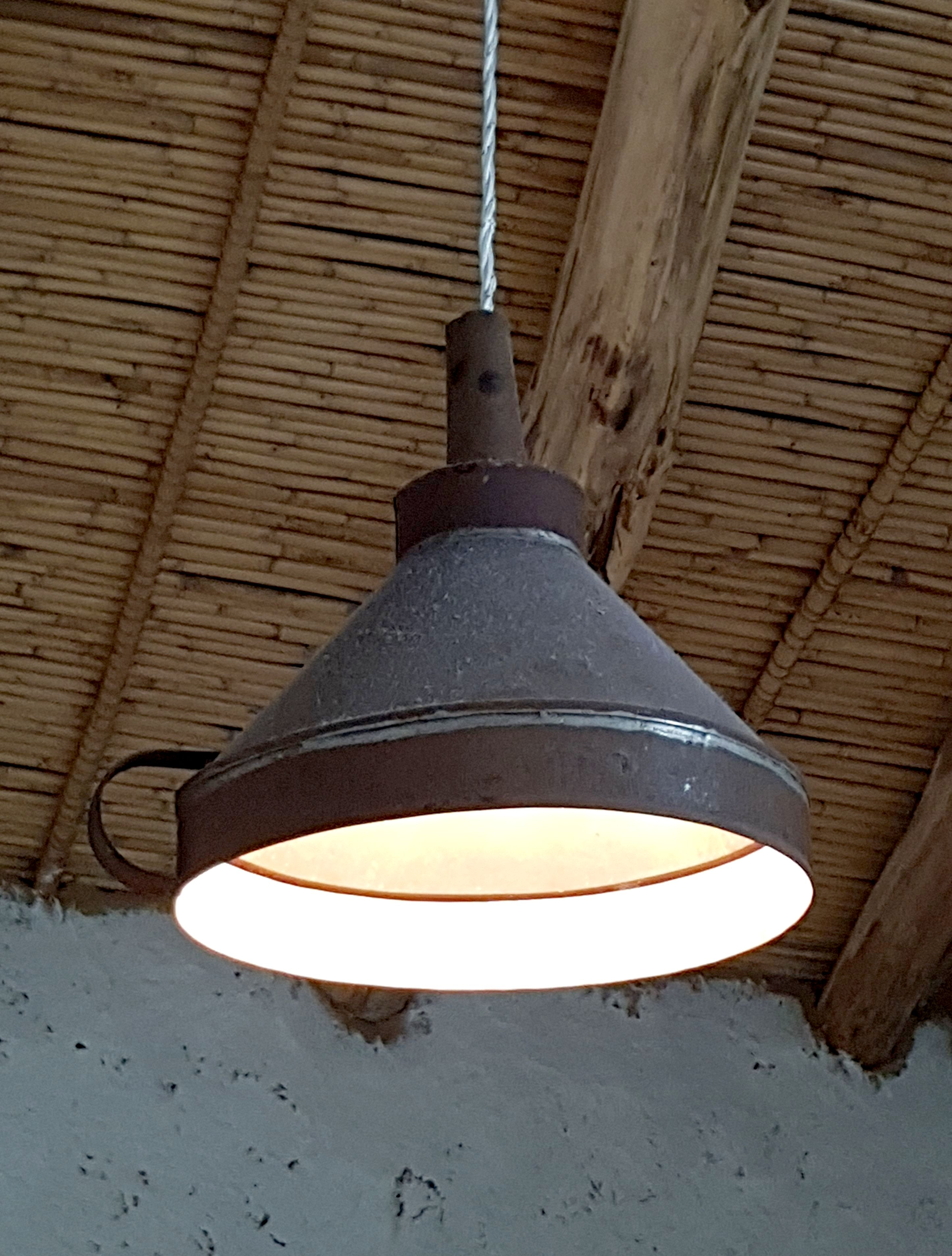
A repurposed funnel lampshade in Sardinia

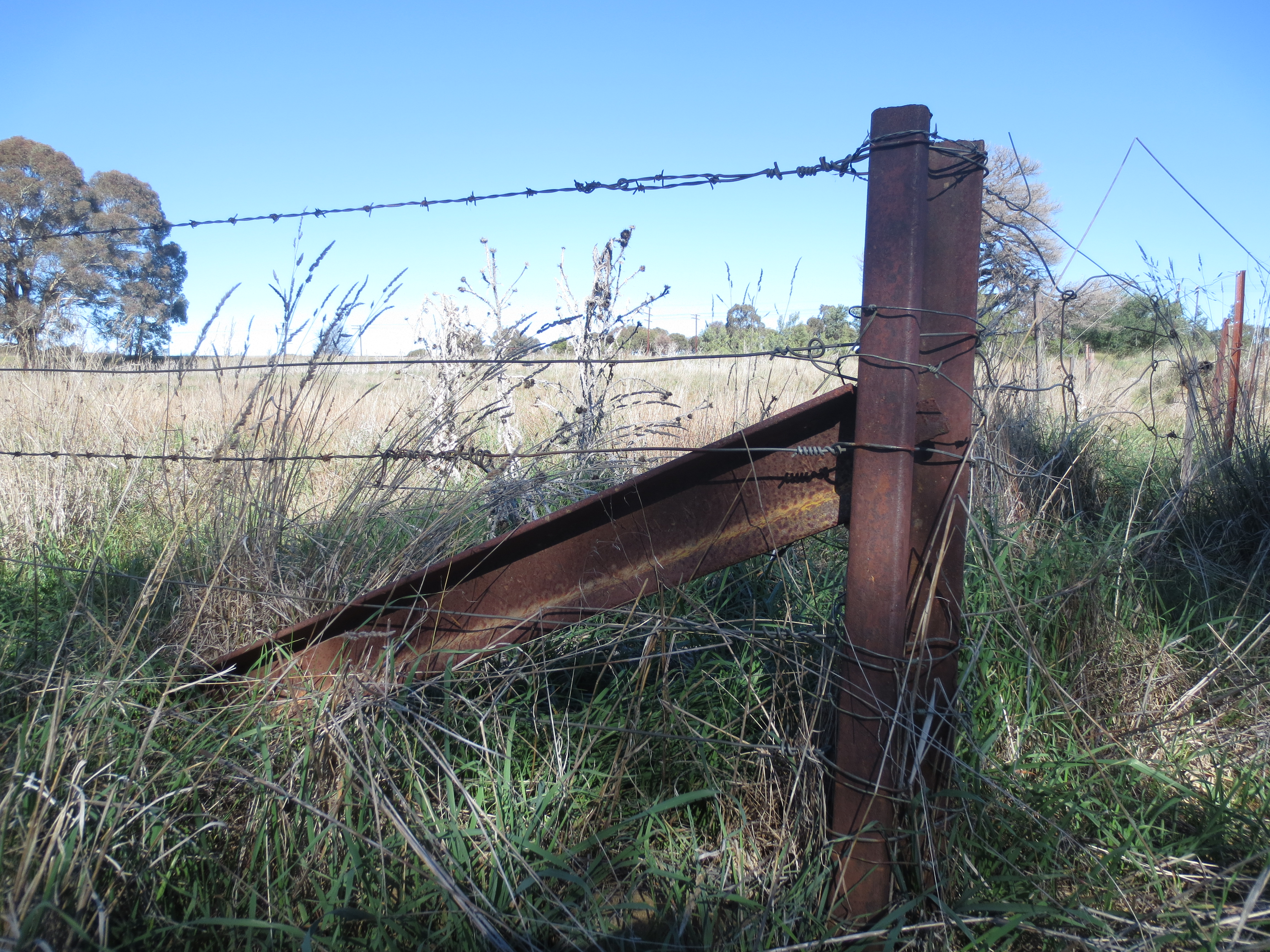
Railway line repurposed as farm fencing corner post

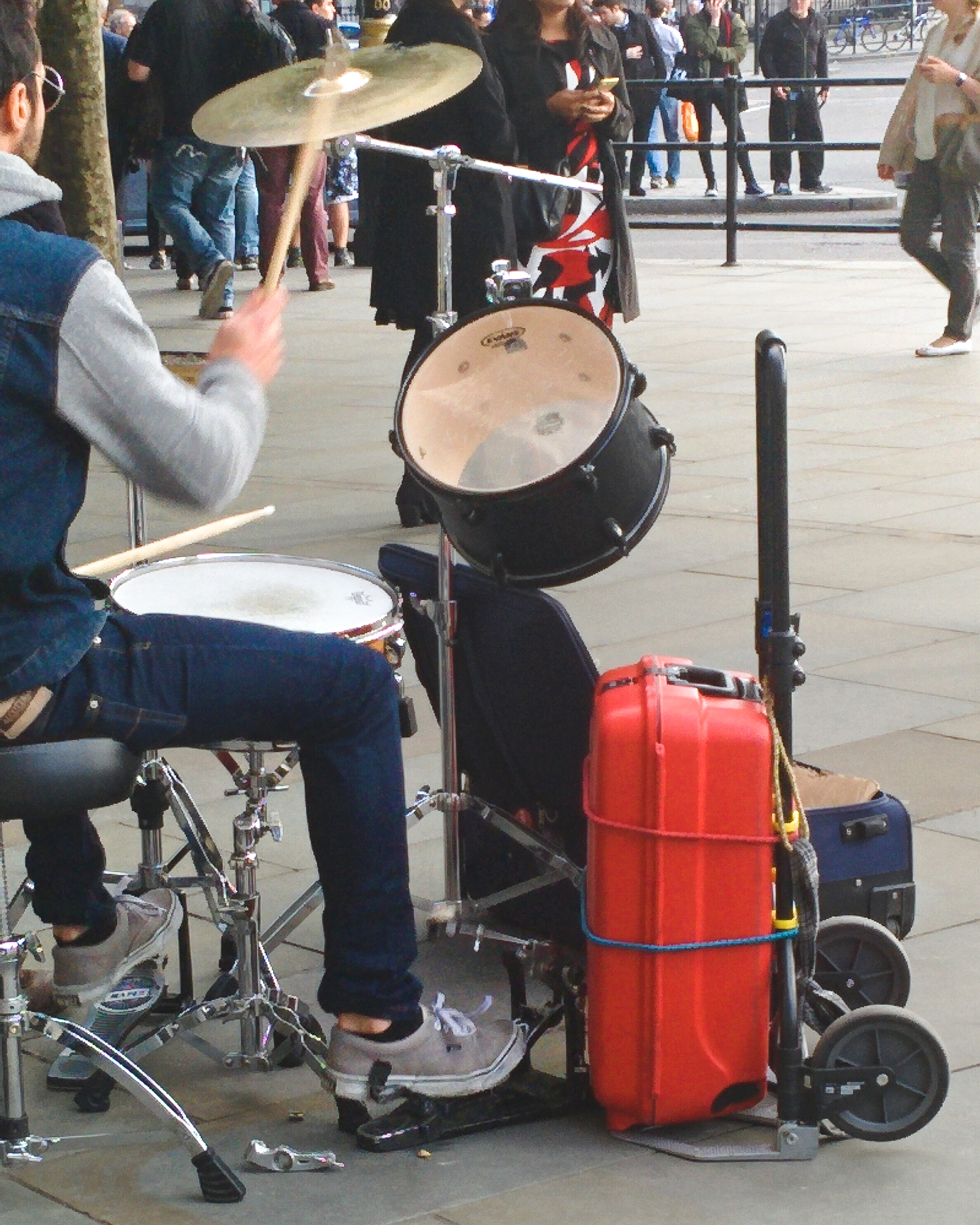
Improvised bass drum in Trafalgar Square, London

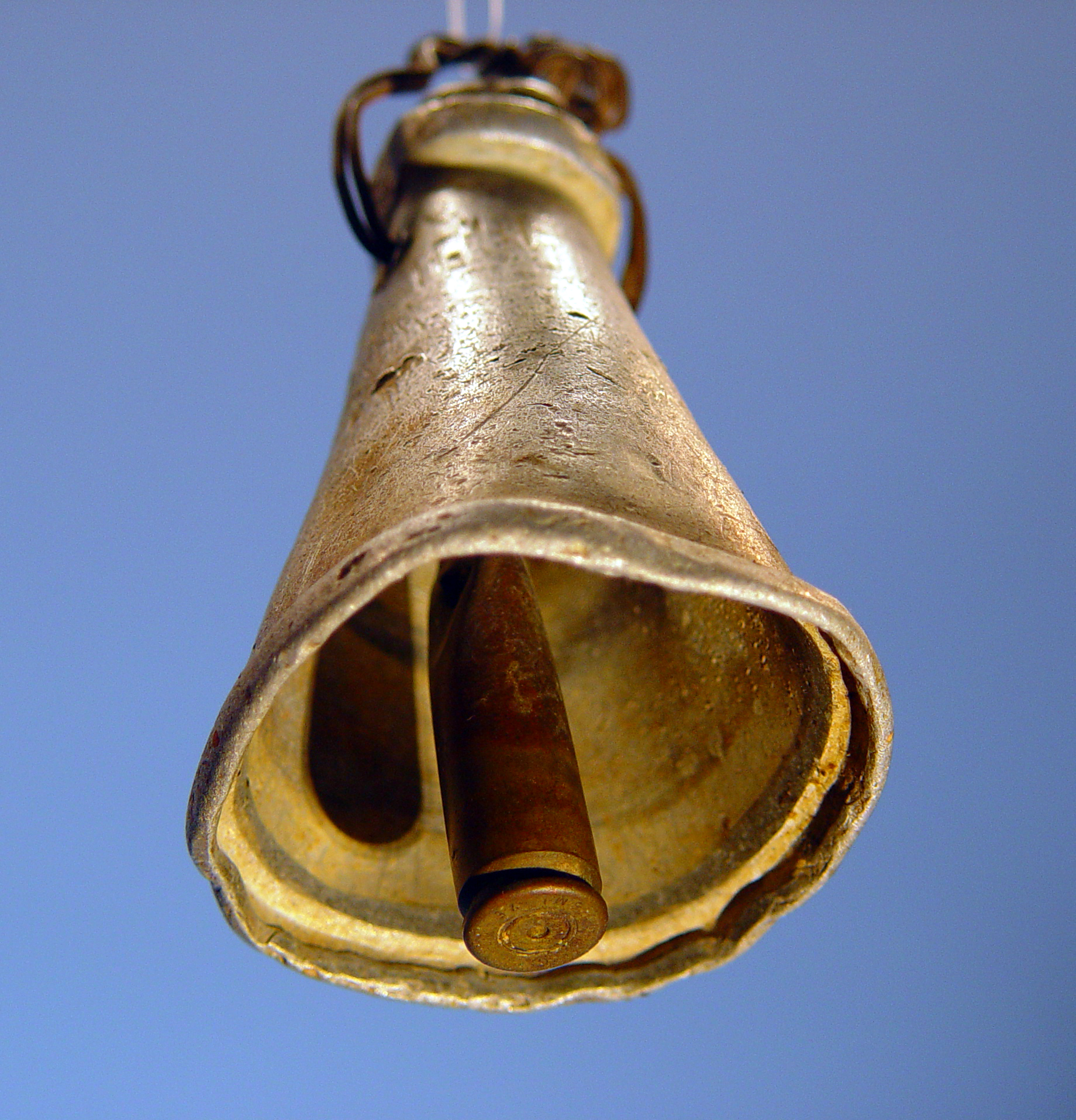
Improvised cowbell for sheep or goats, found in 1988 near Tuqu', the West Bank. The aluminium bell's body is probably a broken kitchen utensil, while the clapper is a brass cartridge case (SMI 25 NATO, probably 7.62×51mm).

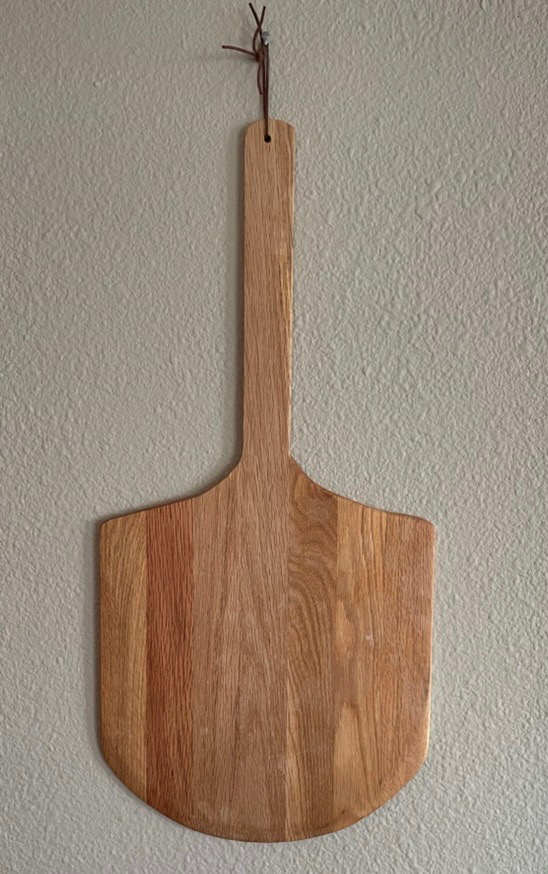
This pizza peel was made from oak floorboards that was salvaged from a home demolition.

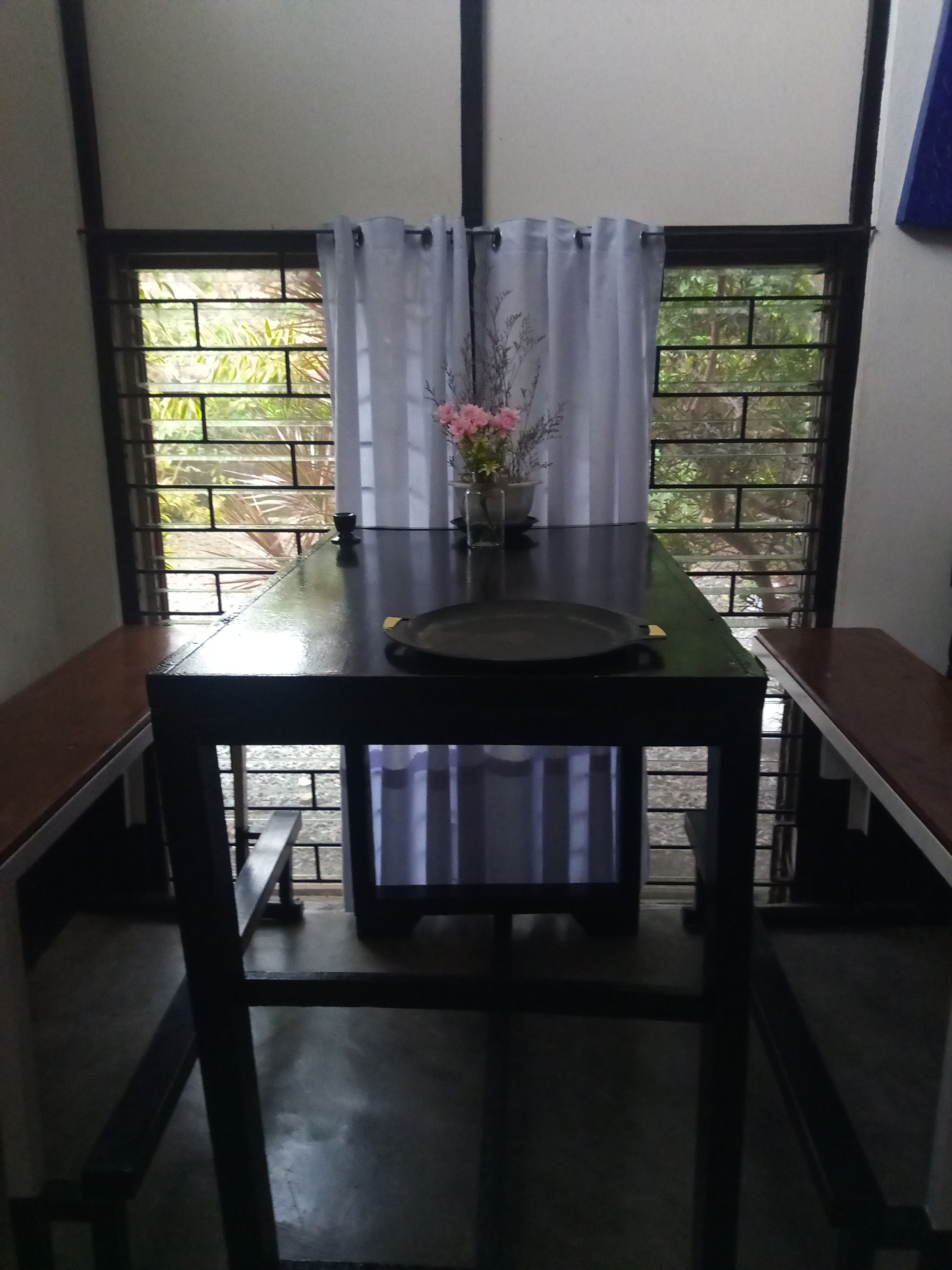
Plywood door repurposed as a tall table, with door knob retained to serve as "hook" for a bag or umbrella, and wood stair steps repurposed as bench seats put on top of bar bench steel frames

== See also ==
- Code reuse – Using existing code in new software
- Computer recycling – Form of recycling
- Exaptation – Function of trait, shifted by evolution
- Jury rigging – Term for a makeshift repair
- Kitbashing – Creation of a new model by combining elements of multiple commercial kit models
- Micro-sustainability – Individual or small scale sustainability efforts
- Planned obsolescence – Product design with limited useful life
- Recycling – Converting waste materials into new products
- Remanufacturing – Concept in design and manufacturing
- Resource recovery – Using wastes as an input material to create valuable products
- Retrocomputing – Hobbyist use of older computer equipment
- Reuse – Using something again
- Reverse engineering – Process of extracting design information from anything artificial
- Upcycling – Recycling waste into products of higher quality
- Used good – Item that is not new being sold or transferred
- Waste minimisation – Process that involves reducing the amount of waste produced in society
- Zero waste – Set of principles focused on waste management
