= Air Infiltration and Ventilation Centre =

- AIVC
- Formation: 1979
- Purpose: Provide information on energy efficient ventilation of buildings
- Members: Australia, Belgium, China, Denmark, France, Greece, Ireland, Italy, Japan, Netherlands, New Zealand, Norway, Republic of Korea, Spain, Sweden, UK and USA
- Official language: English

The Air Infiltration and Ventilation Centre (AIVC) is the International Energy Agency information centre on energy efficient ventilation of buildings.

== History ==
The AIVC started in 1979 in the context of the first and second oil crisis in 1973 and 1979. The centre was established as the 5th research project (Annex 5) in the context of the implementing agreement Energy in Buildings and Communities Programme (at that time called ECBCS) of the International Energy Agency. Since its inauguration, in 1979, the AIVC has been running without interruption. In November, 2020 the executive committee of the International Energy Agency Technical Collaboration Programme Buildings and Communities, approved a 5-year extension period for the AIVC from 2022 till 2026. In the first years, the AIVC's primary focus was understanding and finding ways to limit the energy impact of air infiltration in buildings. This was reflected in its original name “Air Infiltration Centre”. Ventilation was introduced in the name in 1986 because of the strong interactions between ventilation and infiltration in buildings and increasing interest in indoor air quality concerns. The centre has developed an expertise in ventilation and infiltration with a series of technical notes and guides

Concurrent with the expansion of the scientific and professional community and a corresponding increase in research and development, the Air Infiltration and Ventilation Centre (AIVC) recalibrated its operational focus in 2011. To foster collaboration among stakeholders, the organization transitioned toward a strategy centered on networking and the implementation of innovative dissemination practices. The AIVC is administered by the International Network for Information on Ventilation and Energy Performance (INIVE), a registered European Economic Interest Grouping (EEIG) composed of various European building research institutions.

Today, AIVC serves as a source of information for scientists and professionals interested in building ventilation and infiltration issues. The Centre holds annual conferences and workshops, publishes papers and reports, and maintains a large database of publications.

The AIVC also collaborates with the TightVent Europe and venticool platforms; both platforms are market oriented, created in 2011 and 2012 and focusing on building and ductwork airtightness and ventilative cooling strategies in buildings, respectively. In addition, the AIVC has collaborative activities with organizations such as the International Society of Indoor Air Quality and Climate, the Federation of European Heating, Ventilation and Air-conditioning Associations, the International Building Performance Simulation Association, the American Society of Heating, Refrigerating and Air Conditioning Engineers as well as the Indoor Environmental Quality Global Alliance.

== AIVC countries ==
The following countries participate in the AIVC: Australia, Belgium, China, Denmark, France, Greece, Ireland, Italy, Japan, Netherlands, New Zealand, Norway, Republic of Korea, Spain, Sweden, UK and USA.

== AIRBASE ==
AIRBASE is the Bibliographic Database of the AIVC. It contains abstracts of articles and publications related to energy efficient ventilation of buildings. Where possible, sufficient detail is supplied in the bibliographic details for users to trace and order the material via their own libraries. Topics covered by AIRBASE include ventilation strategies, design and retrofit methods, calculation techniques, standards and regulations, measurement methods, and indoor air quality and energy implications.

Entries are based on articles and reports published in journals, internal publications and research reports, produced both by university departments and by building research institutions throughout the world. AIRBASE also includes the AIVC publications and the presentations and proceedings of the AIVC conferences and workshops.

AIRBASE has grown and evolved since the AIVC was established from 1979 to present day, with over 22700 references and more than 16200 documents available online.

== Publications ==
Since its creation in 1979 the AIVC has produced a series of publications grouped in themes.

Ventilation information papers are a series of short publications (6 to 8 pages) intended to give basic knowledge on some aspects related to the air infiltration and/or the ventilation).

The AIVC's collection of technical reports offers detailed information on subjects including ventilation, infiltration, indoor air movement, and measurement techniques.

The Air Infiltration and Ventilation Centre (AIVC) produces a series of guides and handbooks designed to provide comprehensive, expert-reviewed information on specialized technical subjects. These publications synthesize the research, knowledge, and practical experience contributed by specialists across all AIVC member countries, offering detailed coverage intended to be accessible to a professional audience.

Annotated bibliographies is a series of bibliographies aimed at researchers, designers and engineers etc. who are seeking an overview of developments on subjects including ventilation, air infiltration and related fields. The references quoted in these documents are taken from the AIVC's bibliographic database (AIRBASE).

Contributed reports are reports produced by third parties but considered of relevance for the AIVC target audience and therefore also published under an AIVC cover.

The Air Information Review was a quarterly newsletter containing topical and informative articles on air infiltration and ventilation research and application. It was published from 1979 to 2010. Since 2011, the AIVC publishes twice a year a four-page newsletter with the aim to provide information on the progress of the various projects as well as to learn about initiatives (publications, events, etc.) of interest.

== Annual AIVC conferences ==
The AIVC holds a conference each year in September/October in one of the AIVC participating countries, with around 50 to 150 presentations on a variety of topics in the air infiltration and ventilation fields. Since 1980, these annual conferences have been an international meeting point for presenting and discussing major developments and results regarding infiltration and ventilation in buildings. The proceedings of each conference are made available by the time of the next year's conference.

== AIVC workshops ==
The AIVC also organizes workshops, covering a wide range of topics in the field of infiltration and ventilation in buildings.
