= International Energy Agency Energy in Buildings and Communities Programme =

IEA EBC TCP
- Abbreviation: IEA EBC
- Formation: 1977
- Members: Australia, Austria, Belgium, Brazil, Canada, P.R. China, Denmark, Finland, France, Germany, Ireland, Italy, Japan, Republic of Korea, Netherlands, New Zealand, Norway, Portugal, Singapore, Spain, Sweden, Switzerland, Türkiye, United Kingdom and the United States of America
- Official language: English
- Chair: Meli Stylianou (Natural Resources Canada)
- Vice Chair: Prof. Paul Ruyssevelt (University College London)
- Secretary: Malcolm Orme (EBC Executive Committee Support Services Unit)
- Parent organization: International Energy Agency
- Website: www.iea-ebc.org
- Remarks: Carries out research and development activities toward near-zero energy and carbon emissions in the built environment

The International Energy Agency Energy in Buildings and Communities (IEA EBC) Programme, formerly known as the Energy in Buildings and Community Systems Programme (ECBCS), is one of the International Energy Agency's Technology Collaboration Programmes (TCPs). The Programme "carries out research and development activities toward near-zero energy and carbon emissions in the built environment".

== History ==
The programme was formally launched in 1977, following the oil crisis which drove research into alternative sources of energy and technologies to improve energy efficiency. Since then, IEA EBC's main aim has been to provide an international focus for energy efficiency research in the building sector, with its current mission being to “develop and facilitate the integration of technologies and processes for energy efficiency and conservation into healthy, low emission and sustainable buildings and communities, through innovation and research”.

=== EBC Executive Committee Chair ===
Meli Stylianou, Natural Resources Canada (since 2024)

=== Former EBC Executive Committee Chairs ===
- Takao Sawachi, Building Research Institute, Japan
- Andreas Eckmanns, Bundesamt für Energie, Switzerland
- Morad R. Atif, National Research Council, Canada
- Richard Karney, Department of Energy, USA
- Sherif Barakat, National Research Council, Canada
- Gerald S. Leighton, Department of Energy, USA

== EBC Strategic Plan ==
Every five years, the IEA Committee on Energy Research and Technology (CERT) renews the Programme's Strategic Plan. The latest EBC Strategic Plan was developed in 2023 and is effective until 2029.

The strategic objectives of the EBC TCP are:

- the refurbishment of existing buildings;
- reducing the performance gap between design and operation;
- creating robust and affordable technologies;
- the development of energy efficient cooling;
- the creation of district level solution sets.

== EBC Participating Countries ==
Countries currently participating in the EBC are Australia, Austria, Belgium, Brazil, Canada, P.R. China, Denmark, Finland, France, Germany, Ireland, Italy, Japan, Republic of Korea, Netherlands, New Zealand, Norway, Portugal, Singapore, Spain, Sweden, Switzerland, Türkiye, United Kingdom and the United States of America.

== EBC Annexes ==
The EBC carries out research and development (R&D) projects known as Annexes, with a typical duration of 3 to 4 years forming the Programme's basis. “The outcomes of the Annexes address the determining factors for energy use in three domains: technological aspects, policy measures, and occupant behaviour”. Below is a list with completed and current Annexes.

=== Current ===
- Annex 5: Air Infiltration and Ventilation Centre
- Annex 78: Supplementing Ventilation with Gas-phase Air Cleaning, Implementation and Energy Implications
- Annex 79: Occupant Behaviour-Centric Building Design and Operation
- Annex 81: Data-Driven Smart Buildings
- Annex 82: Energy Flexible Buildings Towards Resilient Low Carbon Energy Systems
- Annex 83: Positive Energy Districts
- Annex 84: Demand Management of Buildings in Thermal Networks
- Annex 85: Indirect Evaporative Cooling
- Annex 86: Energy Efficient Indoor Air Quality Management in Residential Buildings
- Annex 87: Energy and Indoor Environmental Quality Performance of Personalised Environmental Control Systems
- Annex 88: Evaluation and Demonstration of Actual Energy Efficiency of Heat Pump Systems in Buildings
- Annex 89: Ways to Implement Net-zero Whole Life Carbon Buildings
- Annex 90: EBC Annex 90 / SHC Task 70 Low Carbon, High Comfort Integrated Lighting
- Annex 91: Open BIM for Energy Efficient Buildings
- Annex 92: Smart Materials for Energy-efficient Heating, Cooling and IAQ Control in Residential Buildings
- Annex 93: Energy Resilience of the Buildings in Remote Cold Regions
- Annex 94: Validation and Verification of In-situ Building Energy Performance Measurement Techniques
- Annex 95: Human-centric Building Design and Operation for a Changing Climate
- Annex 96: Grid Integrated Control of Buildings
- Annex 97: Sustainable Cooling in Cities
- Working Group - Building Energy Codes

=== Completed ===
- Annex 1: Load Energy Determination of Buildings (1977–1980)
- Annex 2: Ekistics and Advanced Community Energy Systems (1976–1978)
- Annex 3: Energy Conservation in Residential Buildings (1979–1982)
- Annex 4: Glasgow Commercial Building Monitoring (1979–1982)
- Annex 6: Energy Systems and Design of Communities (1979–1981)
- Annex 7: Local Government Energy Planning (1981–1983)
- Annex 8: Inhabitants Behaviour with Regard to Ventilation (1984–1987)
- Annex 9: Minimum Ventilation Rates (1982–1986)
- Annex 10: Building HVAC System Simulation (1982–1987)
- Annex 11: Energy Auditing (1982–1987)
- Annex 12: Windows and Fenestration (1982–1986)
- Annex 13: Energy Management in Hospitals (1985–1989)
- Annex 14: Condensation and Energy (1987–1990)
- Annex 15: Energy Efficiency in Schools (1988 - 1990)
- Annex 16: Building Energy Management Systems (BEMS) 1- User Interfaces and System Integration (1987–1991)
- Annex 17: Building Energy Management Systems (BEMS) 2- Evaluation and Emulation Techniques (1988–1992)
- Annex 18: Demand Controlled Ventilation Systems (1987–1992)
- Annex 19: Low Slope Roof Systems (1987–1993)
- Annex 20: Air Flow Patterns within Buildings (1988–1991)
- Annex 21: Environmental Performance (1988–1993)
- Annex 22: Energy Efficient Communities (1991–1993)
- Annex 23: Multi Zone Air Flow Modelling (COMIS) (1990–1996)
- Annex 24: Heat, Air and Moisture Transport (1991–1995)
- Annex 25: Real time HVAC Simulation (1991–1995)
- Annex 26: Energy Efficient Ventilation of Large Enclosures (1993–1996)
- Annex 27: Evaluation and Demonstration of Domestic Ventilation Systems (1993-1997 + extension to 2003)
- Annex 28: Low Energy Cooling Systems (1993–1997)
- Annex 29: Daylight in Buildings (1995–1999)
- Annex 30: Bringing Simulation to Application (1995–1998)
- Annex 31: Energy-Related Environmental Impact of Buildings (1996–1999)
- Annex 32: Integral Building Envelope Performance Assessment (1996–1999)
- Annex 33: Advanced Local Energy Planning (1996–1998)
- Annex 34: Computer-Aided Evaluation of HVAC System Performance (1997–2001)
- Annex 35: Design of Energy Efficient Hybrid Ventilation (HYBVENT) (1998–2002)
- Annex 36: Retrofitting of Educational Buildings (1999–2003)
- Annex 37: Low Exergy Systems for Heating and Cooling of Buildings (LowEx) (1999–2003)
- Annex 38: Solar Sustainable Housing (1999–2003)
- Annex 39: High Performance Insulation Systems (2001–2005)
- Annex 40: Building Commissioning to Improve Energy Performance (2001–2004)
- Annex 41:Whole Building Heat, Air and Moisture Response (MOIST-ENG) (2003–2007)
- Annex 42: The Simulation of Building-Integrated Fuel Cell and Other Cogeneration Systems (FC+COGEN-SIM) (2003–2007)
- Annex 43: Testing and Validation of Building Energy Simulation Tools (2003–2007)
- Annex 44: Integrating Environmentally Responsive Elements in Buildings (2004–2011)
- Annex 45: Energy Efficient Electric Lighting for Buildings (2004–2010)
- Annex 46: Holistic Assessment Tool-kit on Energy Efficient Retrofit Measures for Government Buildings (EnERGo) (2005–2010)
- Annex 47: Cost-Effective Commissioning for Existing and Low Energy Buildings (2005–2010)
- Annex 48: Heat Pumping and Reversible Air Conditioning (2005–2011)
- Annex 49: Low Exergy Systems for High Performance Buildings and Communities (2005–2010)
- Annex 50: Prefabricated Systems for Low Energy Renovation of Residential Buildings (2006–2011)
- Annex 51: Energy Efficient Communities (2007–2013)
- Annex 52: Towards Net Zero Energy Solar Buildings (2008–2014)
- Annex 53: Total Energy Use in Buildings: Analysis & Evaluation Methods (2008–2013)
- Annex 54: Integration of Micro-Generation & Related Energy Technologies in Buildings (2009–2014)
- Annex 55: Reliability of Energy Efficient Building Retrofitting - Probability Assessment of Performance & Cost (RAP-RETRO) (2010–2015)
- Annex 56: Cost Effective Energy & CO_{2} Emissions Optimization in Building Renovation
- Annex 57: Evaluation of Embodied Energy & CO_{2} Equivalent Emissions for Building Construction (2011–2016)
- Annex 58: Reliable Building Energy Performance Characterisation Based on Full Scale Dynamic Measurements (2011–2016)
- Annex 59: High Temperature Cooling & Low Temperature Heating in Buildings (2012–2016)
- Annex 60: New Generation Computational Tools for Building & Community Energy Systems
- Annex 61: Business and Technical Concepts for Deep Energy Retrofit of Public Buildings
- Annex 62: Ventilative Cooling
- Annex 63: Implementation of Energy Strategies in Communities
- Annex 64: LowEx Communities - Optimised Performance of Energy Supply Systems with Exergy Principles
- Annex 65: Long-Term Performance of Super-Insulating Materials in Building Components and Systems
- Annex 66: Definition and Simulation of Occupant Behavior in Buildings
- Annex 67: Energy Flexible Buildings
- Annex 68: Indoor Air Quality Design and Control in Low Energy Residential Buildings
- Annex 69: Strategy and Practice of Adaptive Thermal Comfort in Low Energy Buildings
- Annex 70: Energy Epidemiology: Analysis of Real Building Energy Use at Scale
- Annex 71: Building Energy Performance Assessment Based on In-situ Measurements
- Annex 72: Assessing Life Cycle Related Environmental Impacts Caused by Buildings
- Annex 73: Towards Net Zero Energy Public Communities
- Annex 74: Competition and Living Lab Platform
- Annex 75: Cost-effective Building Renovation at District Level Combining Energy Efficiency & Renewables
- Annex 76 / SHC Task 59: Deep Renovation of Historic Buildings Towards Lowest Possible Energy Demand and CO_{2} Emissions
- Annex 77 / SHC Task 61: Integrated Solutions for Daylight and Electric Lighting
- Annex 80: Resilient Cooling

Working groups:

- Working Group - Energy Efficiency in Educational Buildings (1988 - 1990)
- Working Group - Indicators of Energy Efficiency in Cold Climate Buildings (1995–1999)
- Working Group - Annex 36 Extension: The Energy Concept Adviser for Technical Retrofit Measures (2003–2005)
- Working Group - Communities and Cities
- Working Group - HVAC Energy Calculation Methodologies for Non-residential Buildings

== EBC publications ==
The EBC Programme produces a series of scientific publications. Outcomes and summary reports (for policy and decision makers) of the various running and completed projects are published when available. The EBC newsletter “EBC News” is published twice per year, including feedback from running and forthcoming Annexes as well as other articles in the field of energy use for buildings and communities. The EBC Annual Report outlines the Programme's yearly progress, including among others separate sections summarizing the status and available deliverables for each Annex.
