= Indoor Environmental Quality Global Alliance =

IEQ-GA logo

The Indoor Environmental Quality Global Alliance (IEQ-GA) was initiated in 2014 aiming to improve the actual, delivered indoor environmental quality in buildings through coordination, education, outreach and advocacy. The alliance works to supply information, guidelines and knowledge on the indoor environmental quality (IEQ) in buildings and workplaces, and to provide occupants in buildings and workplaces with an acceptable indoor environmental quality (indoor air quality (IAQ), thermal conditions, visual quality, and acoustical quality) and help promote implementation in practice of knowledge from research on the field.

The group has already begun work to collect and critique IEQ standards and is organising and presenting programmes at the conferences of member organisations and others.

The Alliance was launched on June 29, 2014 during ASHRAE’s 2014 Annual Conference in Seattle by the signing of a memorandum of understanding between AIHA, AIVC, ASHRAE, A&WMA, IAQA, and REHVA. The Alliance was formed by an ad hoc committee appointed by ASHRAE 2013-14 President Bill Bahnfleth to explore ways in which industry groups could work together to address all aspects of indoor environmental quality and health

IEQ-GA was incorporated as a non-profit organization in Belgium in 2019 with ACGIH, AiCARR, AIHA, AIVC, ASHRAE, ISHRAE, and REHVA as founding members of the corporation. The incorporation ceremony took place during the 40th Annual Conference of AIVC on October 15-16, 2019.

== IEQ-GA members ==
The IEQ-GA has the following full members:

- AiCARR (Associazione Italiana Condizionemento dell’Aria, Riscaldamento e Refrigerazione),
- the American Industrial Hygiene Association (AIHA),
- the Air Infiltration and Ventilation Centre (AIVC),
- the Acoustical Society of America (ASA),
- the American Society of Heating, Refrigerating and Air-Conditioning Engineers (ASHRAE),
- the Federation of Ibero-American Air Conditioning and Refrigeration Associations (FAIAR),
- the Federation and Association of the Interior Environment throughout Spain and Andorra (FEDECAI),
- the Institute of Inspection Cleaning and Restoration Certification (IICRC),
- the Indian Society of Heating, Refrigerating and Air Conditioning Engineers (ISHRAE), and
- the Federation of European Heating, Ventilation and Air Conditioning Associations (REHVA)

The IEQ-GA has the following affiliate members:

- The Romanian Chamber of Energy Auditors (OAER)
