= Micro-sustainability =

Individual or small scale sustainability efforts

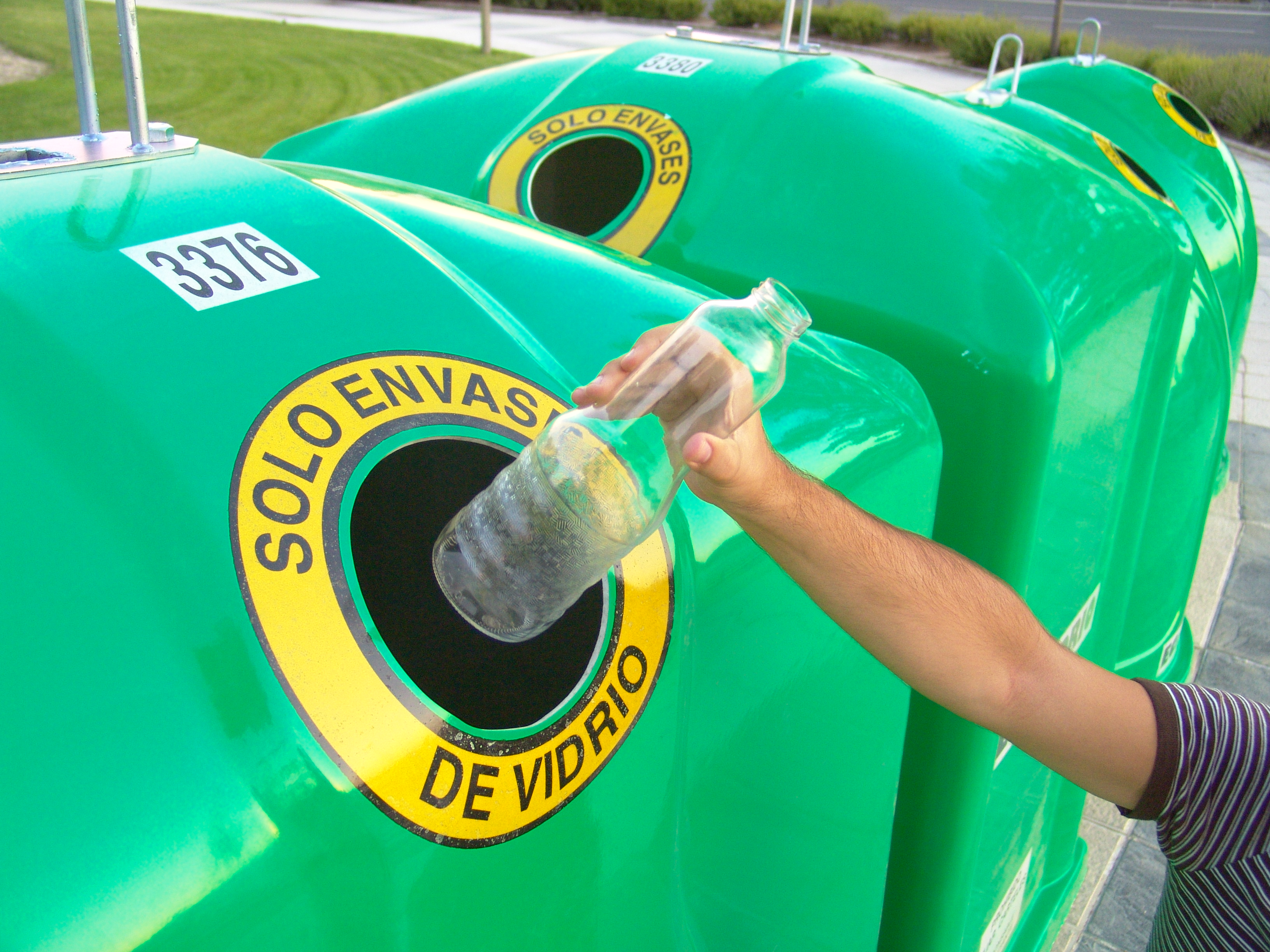
A person recycling a glass bottle into a bin.

Micro-sustainability is the portion of sustainability centered around small scale environmental measures that ultimately affect the environment through a larger cumulative impact. Micro-sustainability centers on individual efforts, behavior modification, education and creating attitudinal changes, which result in an environmentally conscious individual. Micro-sustainability encourages sustainable changes through "change agents"—individuals who foster positive environmental action locally and inside their sphere of influence. Examples of micro-sustainability include recycling, power saving by turning off unused lights, programming thermostats for efficient use of energy, reducing water usage, changing commuting habits to use less fossil fuels or modifying buying habits to reduce consumption and waste. The emphasis of micro-sustainability is on an individual's actions, rather than organizational or institutional practices at the systemic level. These small local level actions have immediate community benefits if undertaken on a widespread scale and if imitated, they can have a cumulative broad impact.

== History ==
- 1960s - The "back-to-the-land movement" promoted self-sufficiency and local community growth.
- 2007 - The transition town network was formed to reduce dependency on oil in the United Kingdom.
- 2007 - The United Nations published Sustainable Consumption Patterns, which outlined small scale sustainability actions.
- 2009 - Jesse Stallone coined the term micro and macro sustainability based on the ideas of microeconomics and macroeconomics.

== Individual actions ==
Micro-sustainability is the result of individuals and communities practicing sustainable living. Sustainable living is a lifestyle that attempts to conserve natural resources. Within an individual household, this can include reducing the water footprint and domestic energy consumption of the building.

=== Water footprint ===
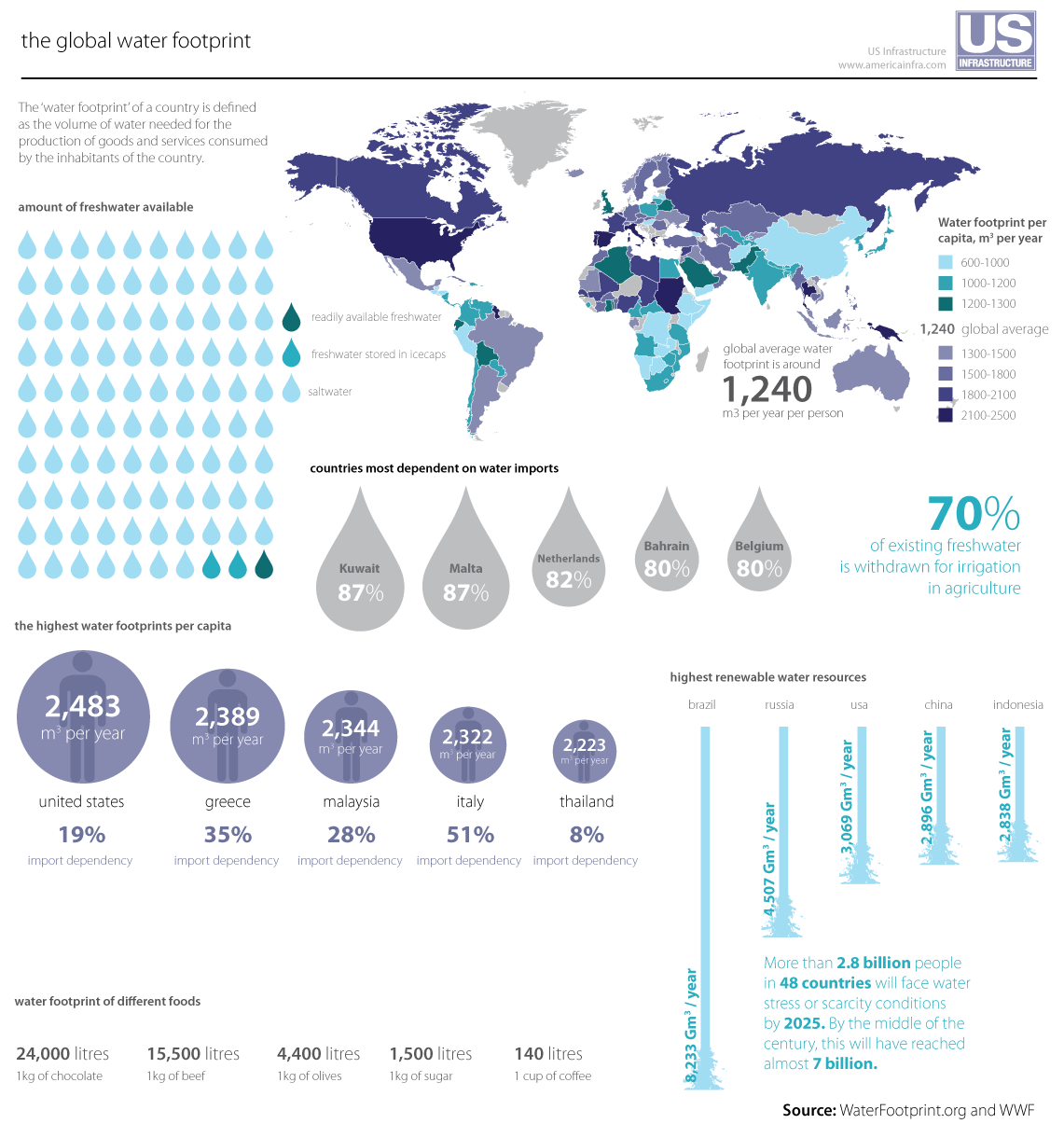
The Global Water Footprint, averages of how much water is used around the world

Like the common concept of the carbon footprint, people can also have a water footprint. Water footprint helps with determining how much fresh water is used and polluted by a given person. With a typical American single-family home using 70 US gallons (260 L) per person per day indoors, household appliances such as toilets, showers, dishwashers, and washing machines can be upgraded to reduce water usage.

=== Energy consumption ===
The Energy Star logo can be found on certified energy-efficient appliances.

The residential sector accounts of 21% of total U.S. energy usage, with approximately 40% of the energy used in homes being used for heating. Individuals can reduce their heating loads by improving their building insulation, improving building airtightness and installing smart thermostat. Other measures outside of reducing the heating load include purchasing energy-efficient appliances and recycling energy intensive materials.

=== Consumer preferences ===
As individuals become more aware of environmental problems that exist, their consumption decisions can promote green designs and ultimately affect the types of products on the market. In a study that looked at consumer preferences for sustainability with respect to mobile phones, it found that consumers are not only interested in the physical product but also raw material sourcing and end of life product disposal. As a result, the study found that major manufacturers consider sustainability in their marketing and products.

Other studies have looked at consumer preferences regarding sustainably sourced food. Food sustainability can reduce the use of natural resources and limit waste. These improvements in food sustainability can have larger, global benefits such as reducing greenhouse gas emissions, water usage, and waste. One study found that consumers who spent more time looking at the sustainability labels were individuals who cared more about sustainably sourced food, and who were more likely to select products with this labeling. Another study showed that not only does sustainable labeling cause consumers to look at the product for longer, but that the consumer choices as a result of that labeling is significant and positive. This means that if consumers value sustainable products that are verified through labeling and are more likely to purchase these products, then food producers and marketers can use this information to provide products that consumer is interested in. Additionally, if consumers are buying more of a product, they are also incentivizing and rewarding producers that are willing to responsibly source food.

== Group and community actions ==
A community in the context of micro-sustainability is a group of people in the same geographic location that interact with one another. These can range from rural communities with low population density to highly dense urban communities. These communities are able to tackle a wider range of initiatives that range in scale from unaligned, independent affairs to organized networks. While small community initiatives can take many forms, they can be generalized as an organized collective bundle of actions stretching several years or decades intended to transform a community into a sustainable state.

=== Rural communities ===
Although there is no exact population size to define a rural community, they are typically seen as areas with lower population density. Green rural communities are places where people value a supportive social network and a low-impact, ecologically sustainable life. These can be defined as transition towns, Low Carbon Communities, or eco-villages.

=== Urban communities ===
Urban communities do not necessarily mean a larger population than rural communities, but that they are more densely populated and more influenced by the effects of urbanization.

Especially with transition towns and low carbon communities, the goal is to see if fundamental changes to society in these niches can lead to a wider acceptance of the innovation. This can occur by replicating, scaling, and translating successful practices. Although the goal is to see if changes on micro scale can ultimately lead to a successful macro-level change, 89% of transition towns were created by individual citizens coming together—not governments or larger organizations.

=== Types of work ===
Depending on the size, wealth, and organization of a community, a variety of sustainable actions can be achieved. These can be broken down into following categories:

==== Land use ====
Sustainable land use can be achieved when communities reduce greenhouse gas emissions by limiting development of roads, parking lots, etc., and focus on promoting green building design technologies and green spaces.

==== Transportation ====
The amount of greenhouse gases being released into the atmosphere due to the number of cars on the roads can be minimized by increasing the number of safe bike lanes and pedestrian walkways, and making public transportation easily accessible.

==== Green spaces ====
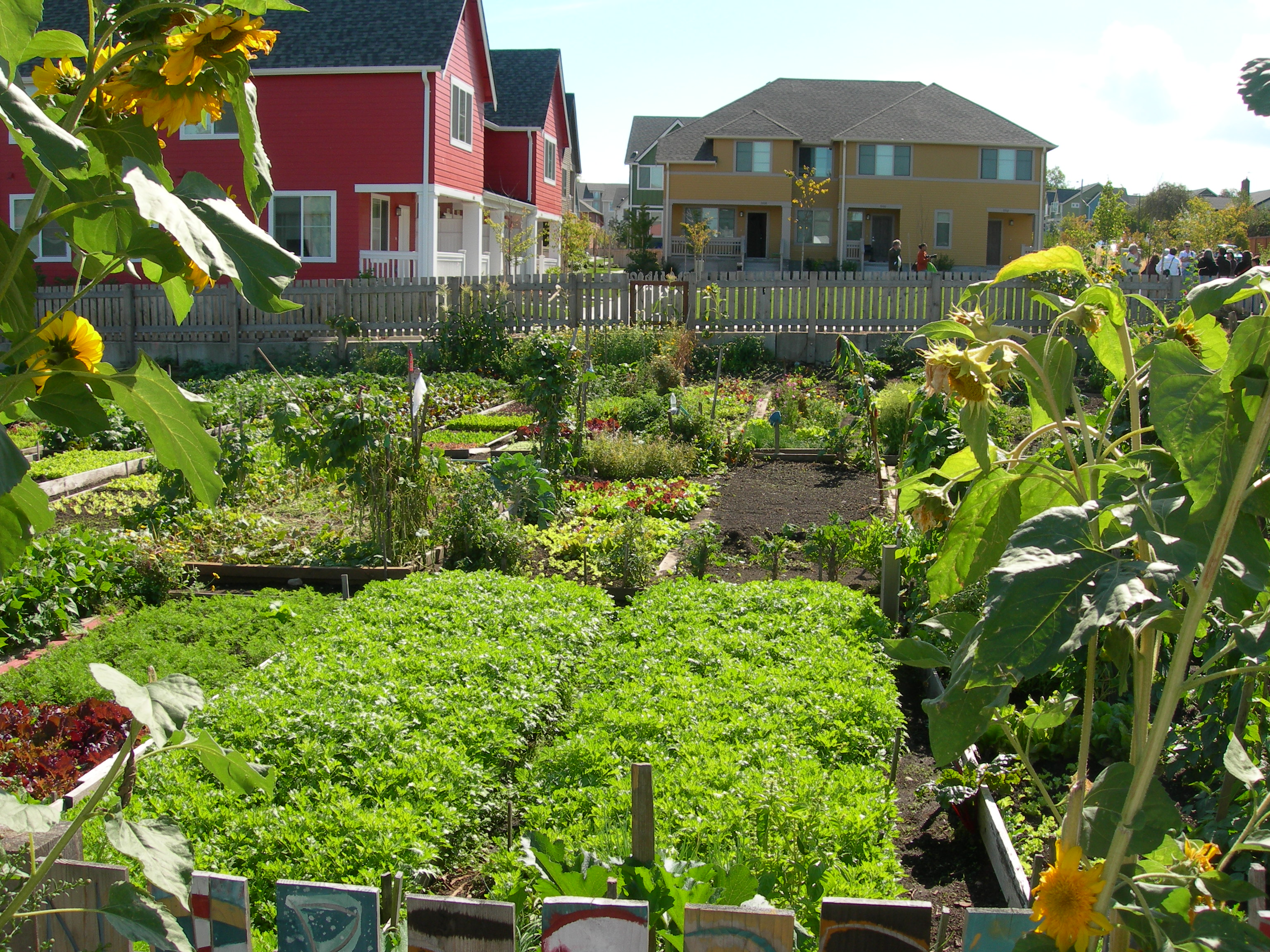
High Point Community Garden in Seattle, Washington

Green spaces within a community protect the habitats of the wildlife in the area. These spaces can be gardens, parks, green alleys, green roofs, and green buffer zones. They can exist successfully when a community provides resources such as land, equipment, knowledge and standards regarding care of the green space, and some sort of governance to ensure that the space is well kept.

==== Renewable energy and waste management ====
Renewable energy can include hydropower, biomass energy, geothermal energy, wind power, and solar energy. Additionally, communities can educate and promote individual sustainable practices mentioned in part 2. This can be in the form of providing information such as directions to resources and household energy performance feedback, monitoring performance like annual surveys of energy usage, or initializing community challenges such as a goal to reach carbon neutrality. Communities can practice sustainable waste management such as incineration, biological treatment, zero waste, and recycling.

=== Methods for success ===
The following are themes seen across micro-sustainable groups that have resulted in increased success:

==== Community learning ====
Effective sustainable intervention occurs in small communities because these spaces allow for greater learning opportunities. One study showed that socialization encouraged learning and innovation which lead to 20% reduction in energy usage sustained over four years. With community gardening, it was found that it transformed an isolated, private task into one that was social, educational, and had a positive impact on the town. They claim that having a group of people in charge of the garden required social interaction and cooperation, and having many members resulted in a collective responsibility that promoted skill sharing and cohesion.

==== Goal setting ====
Another key factor was the community working together around a clear, well defined goal as group members are willing to participate when they know they are contributing to the good of the community. Towns that would offer similar goals such as a community gardens achieved very different levels of success based on the level of structure, goals, and plans that can unite a community and gain interest.

== Criticisms ==
There have been concerns about the effectiveness of micro-sustainability. Much of the research into individual and small community practices are only able to analyze a limited amount of data and cannot fully conclude if the small community changes will result in changes at a larger scale. Additionally, due to its complex nature, it is almost impossible to model or keep track of all aspects of sustainability, and studies that do attempt to model this found that successful situations at a micro level will either not work, or will worsen environmental impacts at a larger scale.

Additionally, some raise questions about the magnitude of change that needs to occur. In the book Sustainable Energy - Without the Hot Air authored by British physicist and mathematician David J.C. MacKay, MacKay advocates against small changes with respect to sustainability and gives the example that if everyone unplugged their chargers from the outlet, this would save enough energy to power 66,000 homes for one year. MacKay warns that these types of statements can be misleading, as 66,000 homes out of approximately 25 million homes participating in this action is a quarter of one percent. In other words, each household is only saving one quarter of one percent by unplugging their phones.

A study that surveyed transition towns across the UK found that 76% of them struggle to grow after initial interest fades. This indicates that scaling up beyond committed environmentalists may not be the best approach.

== Macro-sustainability ==
In contrast to micro-sustainability, the remaining large-scale plans for sustainability, are categorized under the term macro-sustainability. Macro-sustainability is a large systematic addressing of sustainability in most cases by the United Nations, governments, multi-national corporations or smaller companies. They discuss global issues including climate change, and reliance upon fossil fuel hydrocarbon based energy sources. Global organizations like the United Nations have included sustainable development goals (SDGs) to set a standard of 17 goals for countries around the world to take action on climate change and other related issues. Businesses primarily focus on the return of investment of changes such as their source of energy, consumption patterns or how they transport or manufacture products. Governments confront these larger issues through regulation of natural resources, improved practices, providing subsidies and directly investing in new technologies and renewable energy sources.

=== Fashion Industry ===
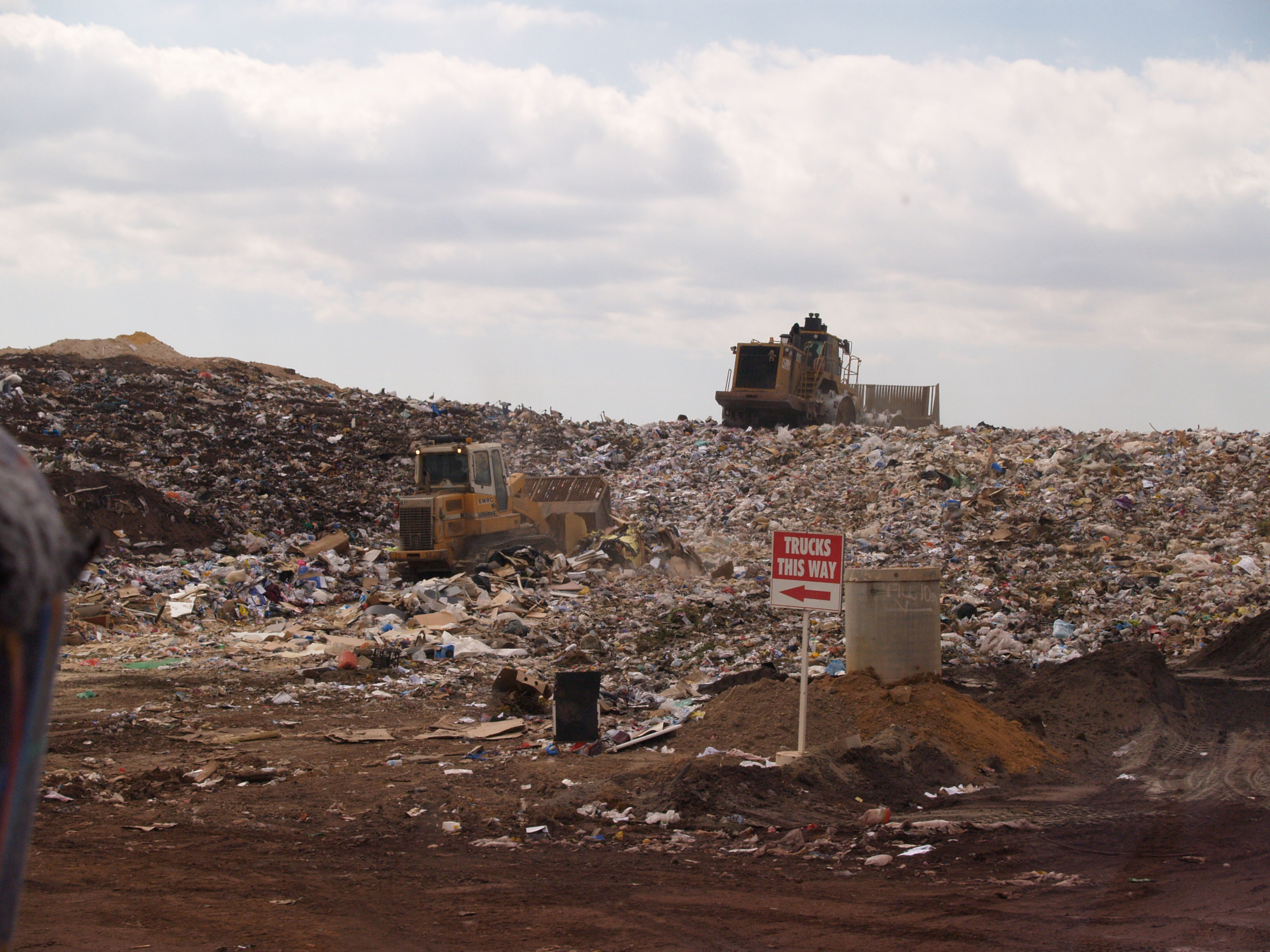
Landfill, where a majority of discarded clothing ends up

The fashion sector is a major contributor to air, land, and water pollution. This industry accounts for 10% of carbon emissions. In textile production, there is a high use of chemicals and water, which then find their way back into waterways. In the US, over 85% of discarded clothes end up in landfills.

The industry's main goal is obsolescence: new trends are constantly being put out to encourage consumption. Fast fashion has become increasingly popular, as it allows consumers to keep up with and then discard these trends at a low cost.

Companies often outsource their manufacturing to less developed countries to further reduce costs for consumers, which has led to the exploitation of workers, a complex supply chain, and pollution due to transportation. Insourcing products to their own facilities that they can maintain a strict standard over would lessen these issues.

Textile waste can be reduced by making higher quality garments that are built to last. A general rule of thumb for fast fashion companies is a "10 wash mark", in which clothes are made to last about ten cycles through a washer and dryer. By extending the practical life of a garment, people can use their clothes for longer periods of time before having to discard them, and thus consume and waste less. Textile waste may also be reduced through recycling and upcycling textile initiatives.

Research and development can also be invested into more eco-friendly dyeing methods. ColorZen, for example, has developed a process of dyeing cotton using 75% less energy and 90% less water.

=== Agricultural Sector ===
The agricultural sector is a major source of food waste, and also contributes to air, land, and water pollution. Food waste is a major component of landfills, which are in turn a major source of methane (a major global warming contributor).

Implementing a variety of sustainability measures would allow for the redistribution of edible food that would have otherwise been wasted, the reduction of competition for limited resources, and the reduction of pollution.

Crop diversification and crop rotation are more sustainable farming practices. They allow for healthier soil, which in turn reduces the need for fertilizers, which then reduces the amount of fertilizer runoff. It also helps in reducing the amount of insects and weeds, which would reduce the use of pesticides. Fertilizer runoff and pesticides both have the potential to disrupt and harm ecosystems. Having multiple crops, as opposed to monoculture, reduces the potential of entire crop yields failing- particularly in a time of climate change.

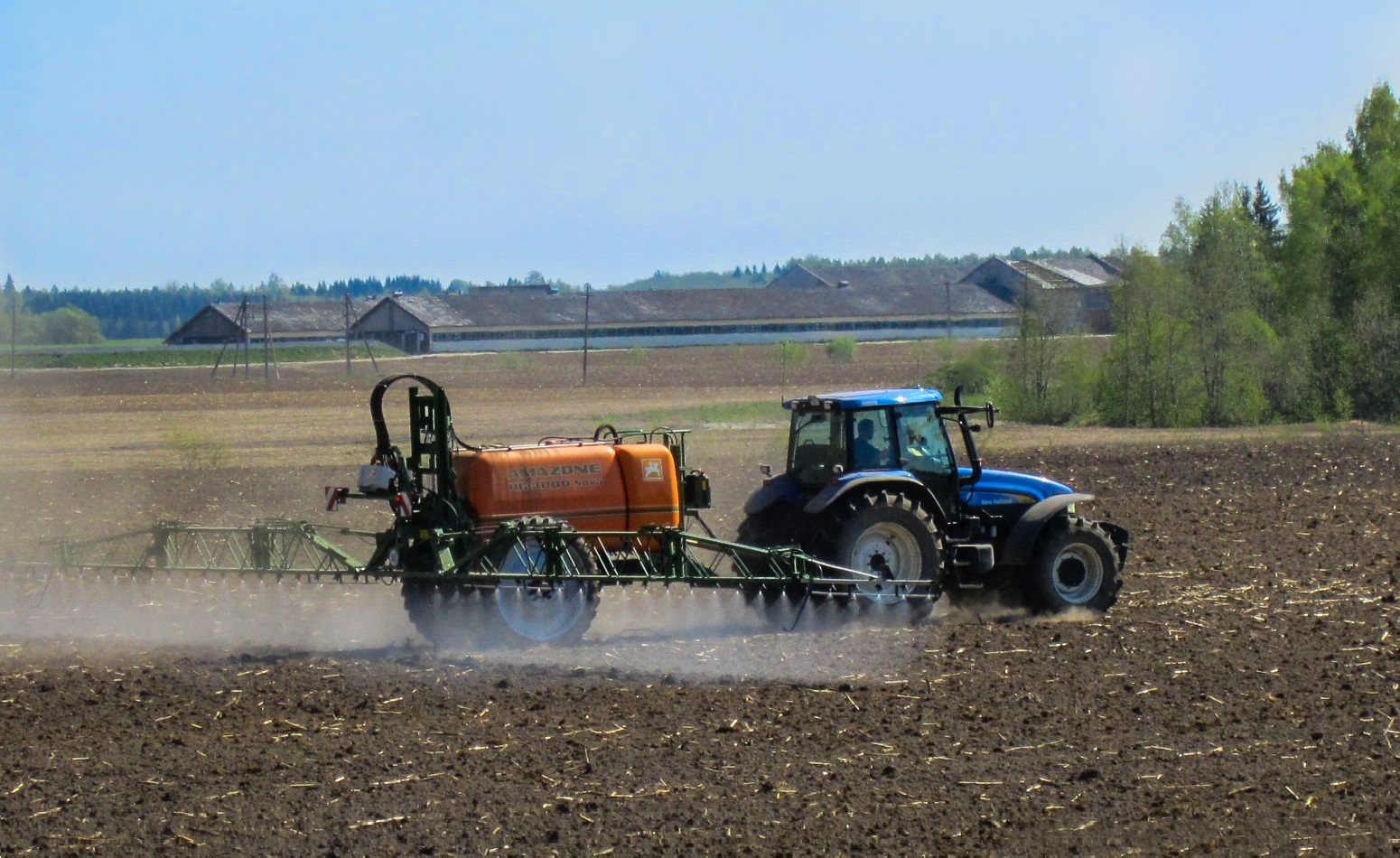
Pesticides being sprayed over crops

Alternative forms of pesticides also contribute to sustainability. Birds, for example, play an important ecological role in the reduction of insect populations; using birds as a natural way of getting rid of insects could decrease the amount of pesticides used.

Water usage in agriculture can also be reduced, which would allow for the resource to be redistributed elsewhere. One method of this is drip irrigation, in which water is delivered directly to the roots of crops. This allows for less water to be used, since less water is lost to evaporation.

Although some food waste is unavoidable, such as bones or peels, there is a large component of avoidable waste. This is due to issues with over purchasing, poor preparation, and inadequate storage. In the US, "10.1 million tons [of food] are left unused on farms and in packing facilities each year." Implementing government tax deductions may provide an incentive for those in the agricultural sector to donate food that would have otherwise been wasted.
