= TightVent Europe =

TightVent Europe logo

TightVent Europe is a platform focused on building and ductwork airtightness issues. The platform's creation was triggered to meet the 2020 targets of the Directive on the energy performance of buildings and overcome the challenges related to envelope and ductwork leakage towards the generalization of nearly zero-energy buildings. The platform's main activities include producing and disseminating policy-oriented publications, networking among local or national airtightness associations, and organizing conferences, workshops and webinars.

== History ==
TightVent Europe was launched and initiated in January 2011 by INIVE (International Network for Information on Ventilation and Energy Performance), a registered whose members include building research centers in Europe. Since then, the platform has received the financial and/or technical support from its partners: ACIN Instruments, BCCA, BlowerDoor GmbH, Buildings Performance Institute Europe, dooApp, Eurima, Industrias Gonal, Lindab, MEZ-TECHNIK, Retrotec, Soudal and SIGA.

== TightVent Airtightness Associations Committee-TAAC ==
In September 2012, TightVent Europe launched the TightVent Airtightness Associations Committee (TightVent TAAC committee) with the primary goal to promote reliable testing and reporting procedures. At present, the participants are from Belgium, Canada, Czech Republic, Denmark, Estonia, France, Germany, Hungary, Ireland, Latvia, Lithuania, Netherlands, Poland, Portugal, Spain, Sweden, Switzerland, UK and the USA. The scope of this committee includes various aspects such as:

- airtightness and ventilation inspection requirements in the countries involved
- competent tester/inspectors schemes in the countries involved
- applicable standards and guidelines for testing/inspecting
- collection of relevant guidance and training documents
- knowledge and experience sharing during the meetings
- providing information on ongoing research work in the building and ductwork airtightness and ventilation inspection fields

== Publications ==
Since 2011, TightVent Europe has published 6 reports in the fields of building and ductwork airtightness. The first publication on the challenges for building and ductwork airtightness was released in 2011 entitled as: “Critical steps for a wide scale implementation of building and ductwork airtightness”. It included an introductory paper browsing the issues of concern and collect a series of technical documents, namely those produced within the ASIEPI project as well as within the SAVE-DUCT and AIRWAYS projects. Another publication: “Methods and techniques for airtight buildings” was released in 2012, with an overview to the design principles and construction methods for building airtightness. Moreover, the publication: "Building air leakage databases in energy conservation policies: Analysis of selected initiatives in 4 European countries and the USA" was also released in 2012 with information on existing envelope air leakage databases from five countries: Czech Republic, France, Germany, UK and USA. Furthermore, another report was produced in close collaboration with the AIVC, "Building airtightness: a critical review of testing reporting and quality schemes in 10 countries", in 2012; a review of testing and reporting about building airtightness and quality management issues for achieving a good airtightness in 10 countries .In 2013, TightVent Europe published "Building and ductwork airtightness: Selected papers from the REHVA special journal issue on ‘airtightness’" composed of relevant contributions from the special issue on airtightness of the REHVA journal.

== Newsletter ==
TightVent Europe publishes a biannual newsletter with up to date information on developments in respect to building and ductwork airtightness, including policy issues, publications, events, innovative technologies, case studies and research activities.
