= Ventilative cooling =

Cooling spaces with airflow

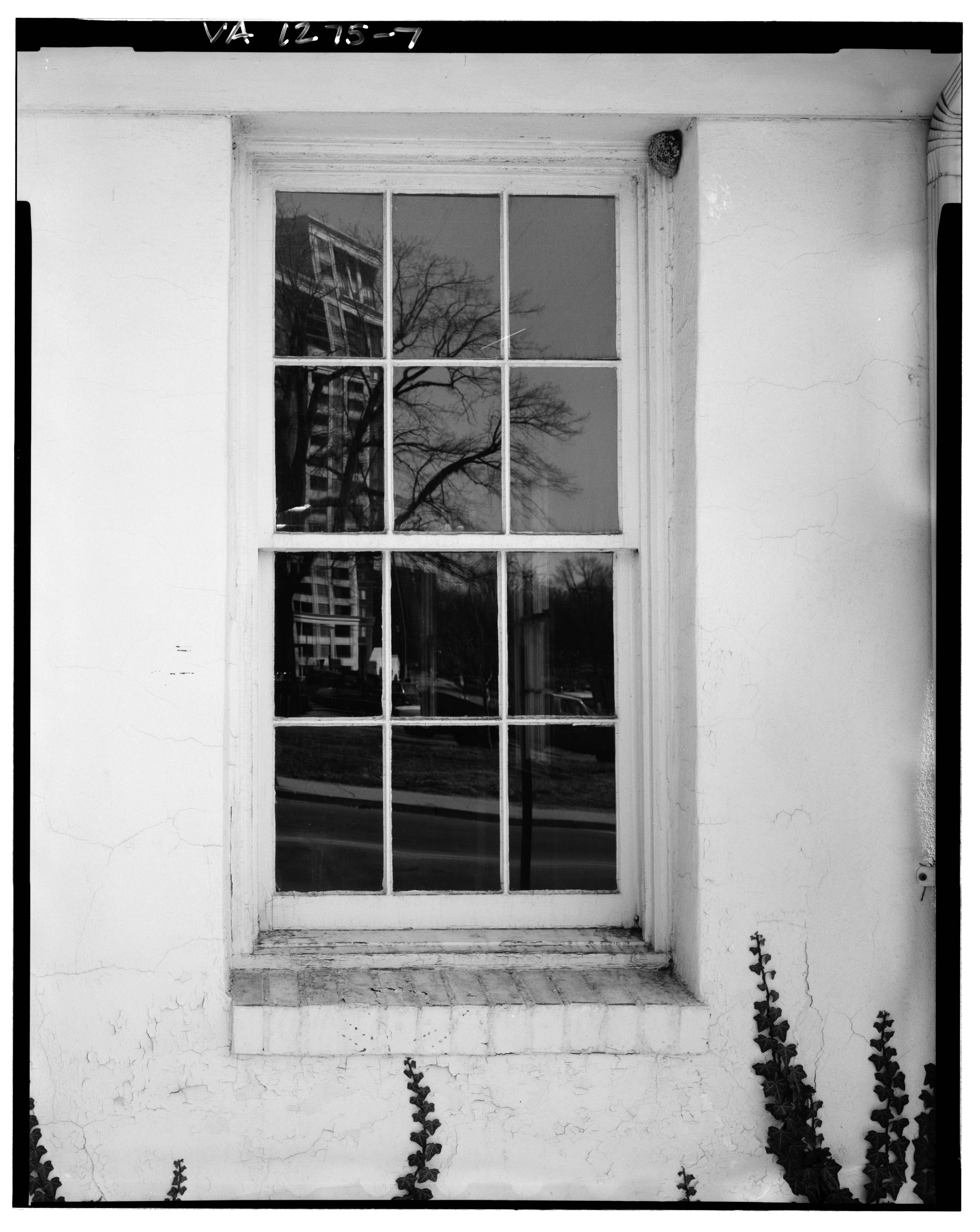
A sash window with two sashes that can be adjusted to control airflows and temperatures

Ventilative cooling is the use of natural or mechanical ventilation to cool indoor spaces. The use of outside air reduces the cooling load and the energy consumption of these systems, while maintaining high quality indoor conditions; passive ventilative cooling may eliminate energy consumption. Ventilative cooling strategies are applied in a wide range of buildings and may even be critical to realize renovated or new high efficient buildings and zero-energy buildings (ZEBs). Ventilation is present in buildings mainly for air quality reasons. It can be used additionally to remove both excess heat gains, as well as increase the velocity of the air and thereby widen the thermal comfort range. Ventilative cooling is assessed by long-term evaluation indices. Ventilative cooling is dependent on the availability of appropriate external conditions and on the thermal physical characteristics of the building.

== Background ==
In the last years, overheating in buildings has been a challenge not only during the design stage but also during the operation. The reasons are:

- High performance energy standards which reduce heating demand in heating dominated climates. Mainly refer to increase of the insulation levels and restriction on infiltration rates
- The occurrence of higher outdoor temperatures during the cooling season, because of the climate change and the heat island effect not considered at the design phase
- Internal heat gains and occupancy behavior were not calculated with accuracy during the design phase (gap in performance).

In many post-occupancy comfort studies overheating is a frequently reported problem not only during the summer months but also during the transitions periods, also in temperate climates.

== Potentials and limitations ==
The effectiveness of ventilative cooling has been investigated by many researchers and has been documented in many post occupancy assessments reports. The system cooling effectiveness (natural or mechanical ventilation) depends on the air flow rate that can be established, the thermal capacity of the construction and the heat transfer of the elements. During cold periods the cooling power of outdoor air is large. The risk of draughts is also important. During summer and transition months outdoor air cooling power might not be enough to compensate overheating indoors during daytime and application of ventilative cooling will be limited only during the night period. The night ventilation may remove effectively accumulated heat gains (internal and solar) during daytime in the building constructions. For the assessment of the cooling potential of the location simplified methods have been developed. These methods use mainly building characteristics information, comfort range indices and local climate data. In most of the simplified methods the thermal inertia is ignored.

The critical limitations for ventilative cooling are:

- Impact of global warming
- Impact of urban environment
- Outdoor noise levels
- Outdoor air pollution
- Pets and insects
- Security issues
- Locale limitations

== Existing regulations ==
Ventilative cooling requirements in regulations are complex. Energy performance calculations in many countries worldwide do not explicitly consider ventilative cooling. The available tools used for energy performance calculations are not suited to model the impact and effectiveness of ventilative cooling, especially through annual and monthly calculations.

== Case studies ==
A large number of buildings using ventilative cooling strategies have already been built around the world. Ventilative cooling can be found not only in traditional, pre-air-condition architecture, but also in temporary European and international low energy buildings. For these buildings passive strategies are priority. When passive strategies are not enough to achieve comfort, active strategies are applied. In most cases for the summer period and the transition months, automatically controlled natural ventilation is used. During the heating season, mechanical ventilation with heat recovery is used for indoor air quality reasons. Most of the buildings present high thermal mass. User behavior is crucial element for successful performance of the method.

== Building components and control strategies ==
Building components of ventilative cooling are applied on all three levels of climate-sensitive building design, i.e. site design, architectural design and technical interventions . A grouping of these components follows:

- Airflow guiding ventilation components (windows, rooflights, doors, dampers and grills, fans, flaps, louvres, special effect vents)
- Airflow enhancing ventilation building components (chimneys, atria, venturi ventilators, wind catchers, wind towers and scoops, double facades, ventilated walls)
- Passive cooling building components (convective components, evaporative components, phase change components)
- Actuators (chain, linear, rotary)
- Sensors (temperature, humidity, air flow, radiation, CO_{2}, rain, wind)

Control strategies in ventilative cooling solutions have to control the magnitude and the direction, of air flows in space and time. Effective control strategies ensure high indoor comfort levels and minimum energy consumption. Strategies in a lot of cases include temperature and CO_{2} monitoring. In many buildings in which occupants had learned how to operate the systems, energy use reduction was achieved. Main control parameters are operative (air and radiant) temperature (both peak, actual or average), occupancy, carbon dioxide concentration and humidity levels. Automation is more effective than personal control. Manual control or manual override of automatic control are very important as it affects user acceptance and appreciation of the indoor climate positively (also cost). The third option is that operation of facades is left to personal control of the inhabitants, but the building automation system gives active feedback and specific advises.

== Existing methods and tools ==
Building design is characterized by different detailed design levels. In order to support the decision-making process towards ventilative cooling solutions, airflow models with different resolution are used. Depending on the detail resolution required, airflow models can be grouped into two categories:

- Early stage modelling tools, which include empirical models, monozone model, bidimensional airflow network models;and
- Detailed modelling tools, which include airflow network models, coupled BES-AFN models, zonal models, Computational Fluid Dynamic, coupled CFD-BES-AFN models.

Existing literature includes reviews of available methods for airflow modelling.

== IEA EBC Annex 62 ==
Annex 62 'ventilative cooling' was a research project of the Energy in Buildings and Communities Programme (EBC) of the International Energy Agency (IEA), with a four-year working phase (2014–2018). The main goal was to make ventilative cooling an attractive and energy efficient cooling solution to avoid overheating of both new and renovated buildings. The results from the Annex facilitate better possibilities for prediction and estimation of heat removal and overheating risk – for both design purposes and for energy performance calculation. The documented performance of ventilative cooling systems through analysis of case studies aimed to promote the use of this technology in future high performance and conventional buildings. To fulfill the main goal the Annex had the following targets for the research and development work:

- To develop and evaluate suitable design methods and tools for prediction of cooling need, ventilative cooling performance and risk of overheating in buildings.
- To develop guidelines for an energy-efficient reduction of the risk of overheating by ventilative cooling solutions and for design and operation of ventilative cooling in both residential and commercial buildings.
- To develop guidelines for integration of ventilative cooling in energy performance calculation methods and regulations including specification and verification of key performance indicators.
- To develop instructions for improvement of the ventilative cooling capacity of existing systems and for development of new ventilative cooling solutions including their control strategies.
- To demonstrate the performance of ventilative cooling solutions through analysis and evaluation of well-documented case studies.

The Annex 62 research work was divided in three subtasks.

- Subtask A "Methods and Tools" analyses, developed and evaluated suitable design methods and tools for prediction of cooling need, ventilative cooling performance and risk of overheating in buildings. The subtask also gave guidelines for integration of ventilative cooling in energy performance calculation methods and regulation including specification and verification of key performance indicators.
- Subtask B "Solutions" investigated the cooling performance of existing mechanical, natural and hybrid ventilation systems and technologies and typical comfort control solutions as a starting point for extending the boundaries for their use. Based upon these investigations the subtask also developed recommendations for new kinds of flexible and reliable ventilative cooling solutions that create comfort under a wide range of climatic conditions.
- Subtask C "Case studies" demonstrated the performance of ventilative cooling through analysis and evaluation of well-documented case studies.

== See also ==
- Air conditioning
- Architectural engineering
- Glossary of HVAC
- Green building
- Heating, Ventilation and Air-Conditioning
- Indoor air quality
- Infiltration (HVAC)
- International Energy Agency Energy in Buildings and Communities Programme
- Mechanical engineering
- Mixed Mode Ventilation
- Passive cooling
- Room air distribution
- Sick building syndrome
- Sustainable refurbishment
- Thermal comfort
- Thermal mass
- Venticool
- Ventilation (architecture)
