= Shinsulator =

A shading insulator, or shinsulator, is used to cover a thermal mass (e.g. roof pond) and insulate the thermal mass as needed, either by re-radiating escaping heat back down towards the thermal mass, or by reflecting solar heat off the panel, reducing heat gathering by the thermal mass.

In the summer, a roof pond system cools the building during the day using a shading insulator, or "shinsulator" to reflect solar energy away from the roof pond and minimize the heat gathering that occurs. At night, the shinsulator can be retracted to allow the roof pond to release stored energy into the environment. Throughout the winter, the system can be used to heat the building by absorbing solar energy during the day with the shinsulator retracted. At night, the shinsulator can be repositioned over the roof pond to minimize heat loss to the environment, allowing gathered energy to radiate into the building.
