= Mixed-mode ventilation =

Architectural ventilation using natural and mechanical systems

Mixed-mode ventilation is a hybrid approach to space conditioning that uses a combination of natural ventilation from operable windows (either manually or automatically controlled), and mechanical systems that include air distribution equipment and refrigeration equipment for cooling. A well-designed mixed-mode building begins with intelligent facade design to minimize cooling loads. It then integrates the use of air conditioning when and where it is necessary, with the use of natural ventilation whenever it is feasible or desirable, to maximize comfort while avoiding the significant energy use and operating costs of year-round air conditioning.
