= Building airtightness =

Building property

Building airtightness (also called envelope airtightness) can be defined as the resistance to inward or outward air leakage through unintentional leakage points or areas in the building envelope. This air leakage is driven by differential pressures across the building envelope due to the combined effects of stack, external wind and mechanical ventilation systems.

Airtightness is the fundamental building property that impacts infiltration and exfiltration (the uncontrolled inward and outward leakage of outdoor air through cracks, interstices or other unintentional openings of a building, caused by pressure effects of the wind and/or stack effect).

An airtight building has several positive impacts when combined with an appropriate ventilation system (whether natural, mechanical, or hybrid):

- Lower heating bills due to less heat loss, with potentially smaller requirements for heating and cooling equipment capacities
- Better performing ventilation system
- Reduced chance of mold and rot because moisture is less likely to enter and become trapped in cavities
- Fewer draughts and thus increased thermal comfort

A number of studies have shown substantial energy savings by tightening building envelopes. The ASIEPI project technical report on building and ductwork airtightness estimates the energy impact of envelope airtightness in the order of 10 kWh per m^{2} of floor area per year, for the heating needs in a moderately cold region (2500 degree-days). Experimental data showing the energy savings of good airtightness were also published by the Building Research Establishment in the UK as well as REHVA journals' special issue on airtightness. They conclude 15% of the space conditioning energy use can be saved in the UK context going from 11.5 m^{3}/(m^{2}·h) @50 Pa (average current value) down to 5 m^{3}/(m^{2}·h) @50 Pa (achievable).

Given its impacts on heat losses, good building airtightness may allow installation of smaller heating and cooling capacities. Conversely, poor airtightness may prevent achieving the desired indoor temperature conditions if the equipment has not been sized with proper estimates of infiltration heat losses.

From an energy point of view, it is almost always desirable to increase air tightness, but if infiltration is providing useful dilution of indoor contaminants, indoor air quality may suffer. However, it is often unclear how useful this dilution is because building leaks cause uncontrolled airflows and potentially poorly ventilated rooms although the total building air exchange rate may be sufficient. This adverse effect has been confirmed by numerical simulations in the French context which has shown that typical mechanical ventilation systems yielded better indoor air quality with tighter envelopes.

Air leaking across the envelope from the relatively warm & humid side to the relatively cold & dry side may cause condensation and related damage as its temperature drops below the dew point.

== Air leakage pathways ==
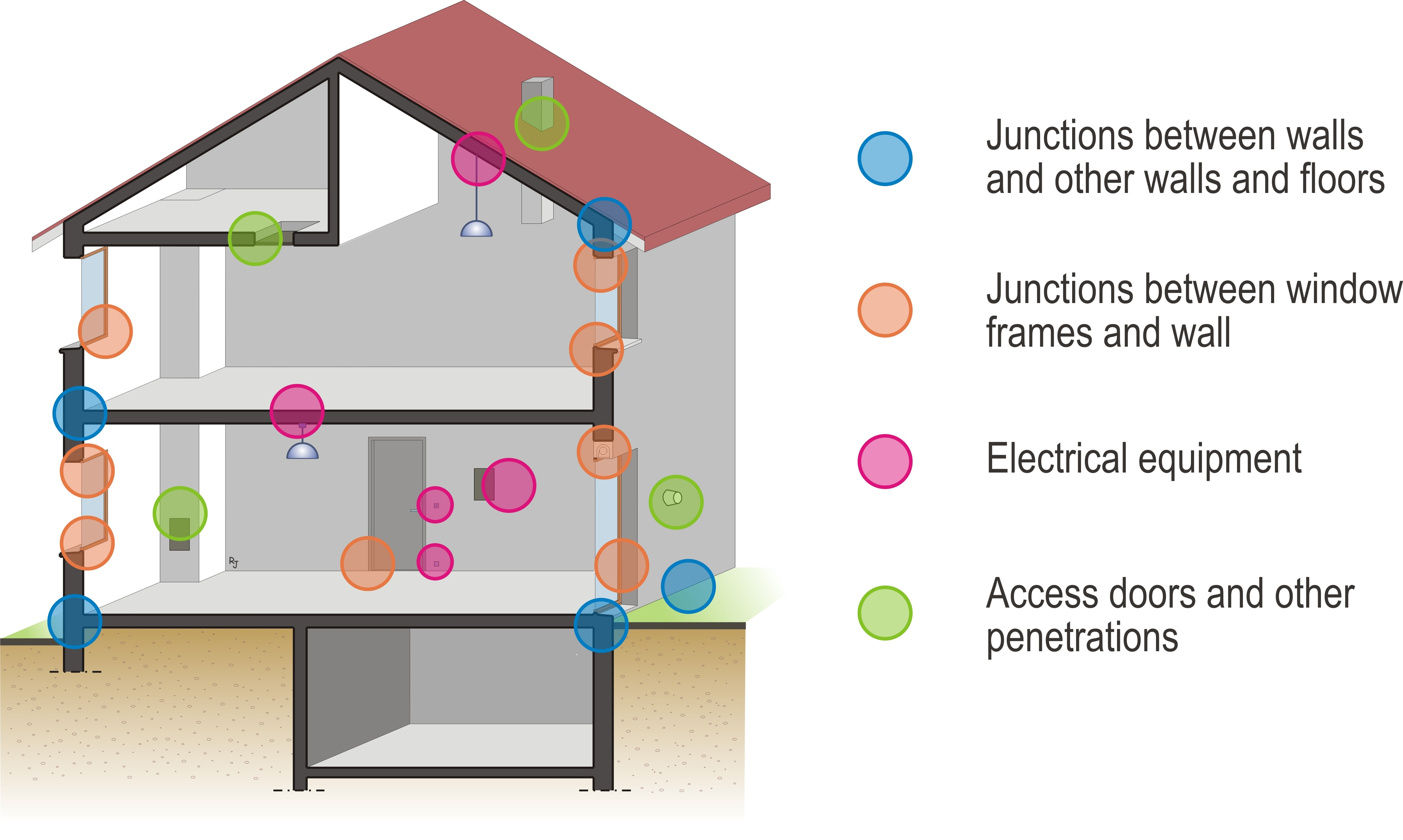
Common leakage sites classified in 4 categories

Leakage typically occurs at the following locations on the building envelope:

- Junctions between walls and other walls or floors
- Junctions between window frames and walls
- Electrical equipment
- Access doors and other wall penetrations

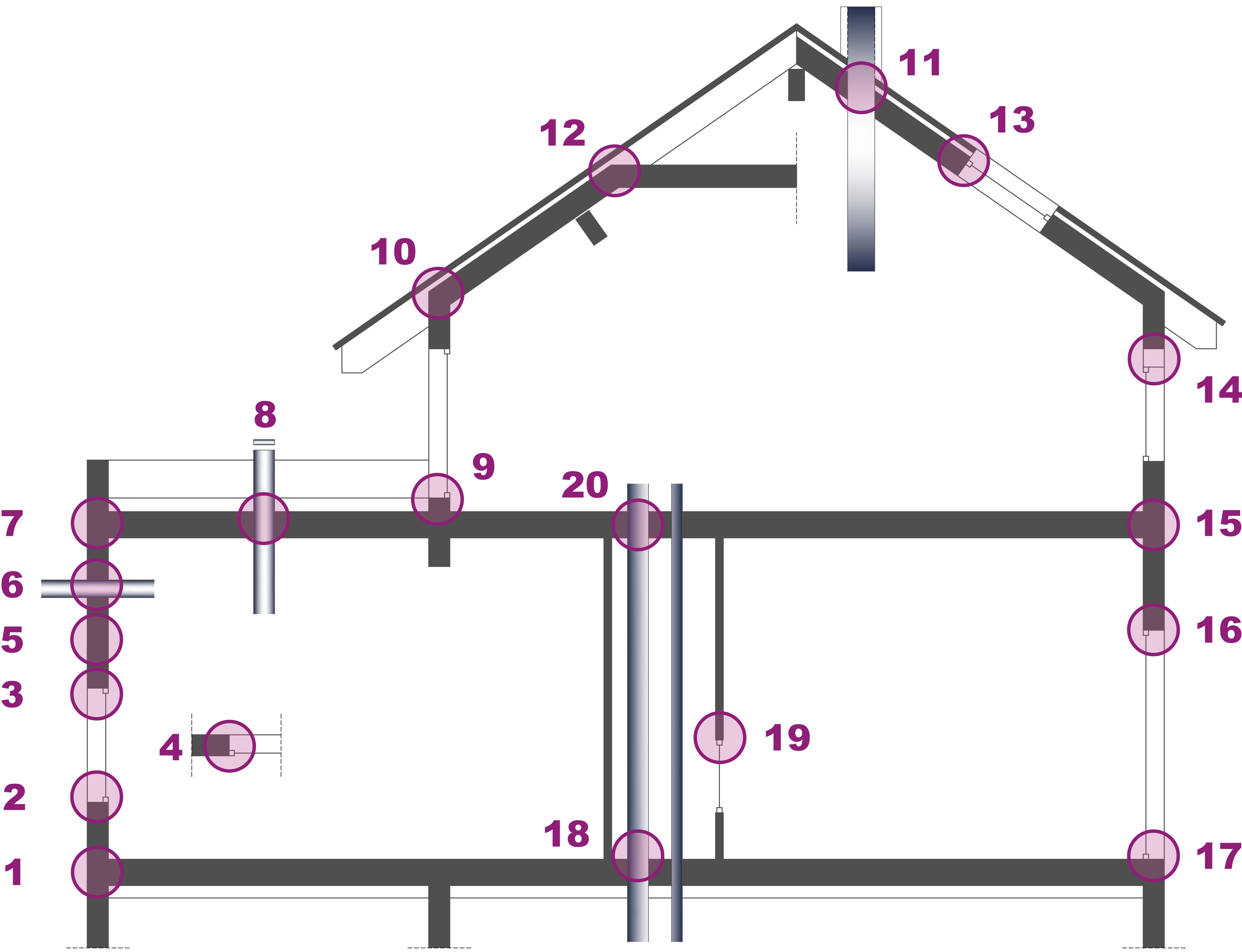
Vertical section of a typical building with identification of potential leakage junctions

Common leakage sites are listed in the Figure and explained below:

1. Junction lower floor / vertical wall
2. Junction window sill / vertical wall
3. Junction window lintel / vertical wall
4. Junction window reveal / vertical wall (horizontal view)
5. Vertical wall (Cross section)
6. Perforation vertical wall
7. Junction top floor / vertical wall
8. Penetration of top floor
9. Junction French window / vertical wall
10. Junction inclined roof / vertical wall
11. Penetration inclined roof
12. Junction inclined roof / roof ridge
13. Junction inclined roof / window
14. Junction rolling blind / vertical wall
15. Junction intermediate floor / vertical wall
16. Junction exterior door lintel / vertical wall
17. Junction exterior door sill / sill
18. Penetration lower floor / crawlspace or basement
19. Junction service shaft / access door
20. Junction internal wall / intermediate floor

== Metrics ==
The airtightness of a building is often expressed in terms of the leakage airflow rate through the building's envelope at a given reference pressure (usually 50 pascal) divided by the:

- Heated building volume V. At 50·Pa, it is called the air change rate at 50 Pa and usually noted n_{50}(units: h^{−1}).
- Envelope area A_{E}. At 50 Pa, it is called the air permeability at 50 Pa and noted usually q_{50} or q_{a50} (units: m^{3}/(h·m^{2}))
- Floor area A_{F}. At 50 Pa, it is called the specific leakage rate and usually noted w_{50} (units: m^{3}/(h·m^{2}))

The effective leakage area (ELA) at a reference pressure is also a common metric used to characterize envelope airtightness. It represents the area of a perfect orifice that would produce the same airflow rate as that passing through the building envelope at the reference pressure. To allow comparisons between buildings, the ELA may be divided by the envelope or floor area, or may be used to derive the normalized leakage area (NL).

For all of these metrics, the lower the 'airtightness' value is for a given building, the more airtight the building's envelope is.

== Power law model of airflow through leaks ==
The relationship between pressure and leakage air flow rate is defined by the power law between the airflow rate and the pressure difference across the building envelope as follows:

q_{L}=C_{L}∆p^{n}

where:

- q_{L} is the volumetric leakage airflow rate expressed in m^{3}h^{−1}
- C_{L} is the air leakage coefficient expressed in m^{3}h^{−1}Pa^{−n}
- ∆p is the pressure difference across the building envelope expressed in Pa
- n is the airflow exponent (0.5 ≤ n ≤ 1)

This law enables to assess the airflow rate at any pressure difference regardless the initial measurement.

== Fan pressurization test ==
Building airtightness levels can be measured by using a fan, temporarily installed in the building envelope (a blower door) to pressurize the building. Air flow through the fan creates an internal, uniform, static pressure within the building. The aim of this type of measurement is to relate the pressure differential across the envelope to the air flow rate required to produce it. Generally, the higher the flow rate required to produce a given pressure difference, the less airtight the building. The fan pressurization technique is also described in many standard test methods, such as ASTM E779 - 10, ASTM E1827 – 11, CAN/CGSB-149.10-M86, CAN/CGSB-149.15-96, ISO 9972:2006 (now superseded), & EN 13829 which is now 'withdrawn' due to the updated ISO 9972:2015.

== Airtightness requirements ==
Most European countries include in their regulations either required or recommended minimum airtightness levels with or without mandatory testing. There are several countries (e.g., United Kingdom, France, Portugal, Denmark, Ireland) where, by regulation, airtightness testing is mandatory for certain building types or in the case of specific programmes.

In the US, the IECC of 2012 adopted whole building airtightness requirements, including mandatory testing. In addition, in May, 2012, USACE issued a new Engineering and Construction Bulletin in collaboration with the Air Barrier Association of America, outlining Army requirements for building airtightness and building air leakage testing for new and renovation construction projects. Washington was the first State to institute air barrier requirements with both a maximum material air leakage requirement and a whole building maximum air permeability rate with testing requirements for buildings six stories and higher.

There are several voluntary programs that require a minimum airtightness level for the building envelope (Passivhaus, Minergie-P, Effinergie etc.). Historically, the Passivhaus standard, originated in 1988 was the cornerstone for envelope airtightness developments because these types of buildings require extremely low leakage levels (n_{50} below 0.6 ach).
