= Shadirwan =

Shadirwan may refer to:

- Shadirvan, a fountain in a courtyard
- Salsabil (fountain) a wall fountain with a large surface area
- Band-e Kaisar, an ancient bridge in Iran
