= Kilga =

Pedestal for water jug, in the Nile Valley

A kilga is a stone pedestal on which a large unglazed ceramic water jug is placed. They were designed to catch and direct the filtered water that seeps out from the bottom of the water jug. Kilgas originated in the Fatimid period in Cairo, Egypt, and their design mirrors that of the local architecture, in addition to figural and animal imagery engraved into their marble. Because water was a valuable resource in Cairo, ownership and use of a Kilga was a display of wealth and power as it provided the owner with a source of filtered, cool drinking water. Their use was connected to the Nile river, forming a part of the visual culture of water in Fatimid Egypt.

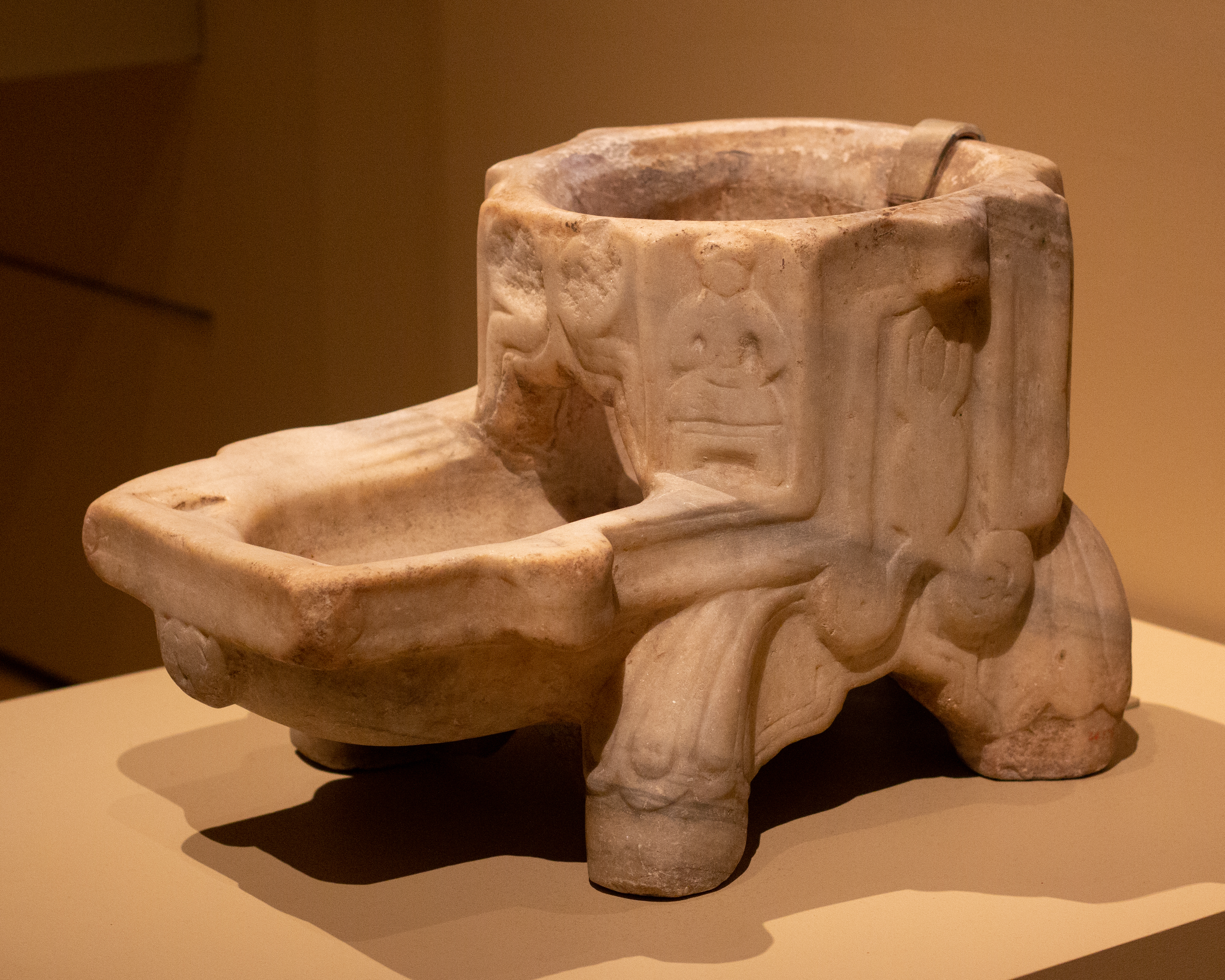
A kilga from 11th-12th century Egypt or Syria

== Physical description ==
Kilgas are composed of three main sections. The upper section is a hollow cylindrical or octagonal portal upon which a water jar is placed. This leads to a rectangular basin that juts out from the front of the structure. No two kilgas have been found manufactured identically, but one kilgas studied at the Boston Museum of Fine Arts measured a kilga to be 34.9 cm (13 ¾ in.) tall, 36.8 cm (14 ½ in.) wide, and 52.1 cm (20 ½ in.) in depth. Water filtered through the bottom of the supported jar would drip down collect in this part of the structure. These jars were often unglazed in order to take advantage of the porous clay’s leaking and filtration effects, as well as to provide a slight cooling effect as water seeped through. Supporting the kilga’s portal and basin are four feet, two at the back of the structure, and two at the point where the basin begins to extend forward. These keep the structure level and supported. Because they were carved from a single block of marble, kilgas’ surface is composed entirely of monochromatic carved marble, often showing only slight differentiations in color due to age. Many kilgas also show signs of wear in their basin, from repeated use. Marble was not a native material of Cairo, so it is likely that any in use was sourced from architectural spoils from other parts of the world.

== Ornamentation ==
Kilgas are functional objects that are characterized by their unique ornament. No two kilgas are alike, but many kilgas feature similar visual elements. They tend to echo architectural features that are distinct to buildings in Cairo. Most kilgas feature two carved arches, one on each side of the hollow cylinder or rectangle upon which the water basin sits. These smaller carved arches resemble the tricuspid arch, a distinct architectural feature associated with the Fatimid and Mamluk periods. These archways are generally accompanied by columns on either side and, in some cases, interlacing molding. Roughly fifteen surviving Kilgas also feature miniature muqarnas; parallels have been drawn between the muqarnas found on these kilgas and muqarnas on the Aqmar mosque. Another reference to local architecture found on kilgas are the zig-zagged panels resembling staircases carved into the walls of some kilgas; scholars have posited that this pattern is a reference to the Shadirvan or Salsabil, water features seen across the medieval Islamic world.

Apart from their architectural references, many kilgas feature figural and animal imagery. Carved images of nude figures and guards can be seen placed on the corners or sides of the king’s base. The presence of these figures might imply that the Kilgas were intended for secular uses. In some cases, figures featured on kilgas show visible signs of attempts to strip the carvings or obliterate the figure’s faces. Kilgas also often feature animal imagery. Lions are consistently featured in kilga ornamentation, usually protruding from the king’s surface; lions are often portrayed in conjunction with water in Islamic architecture. Inscription on kilgas is rare but sometimes can be found wrapped around the body of the stand. These inscriptions usually do not provide details about the object but instead usually feature benedictory phrases written in kufic Arabic.

== Relation to the Nile ==
The use of kilgas was deeply connected to the Nile. Since Cairo is surrounded by desert, sources of water were in high demand and objects used to hold and store water were a necessity, and the annual flooding of the Nile determined the livelihood of the people living in Cairo. The Nilometer was created to measure the height of the water in the river. Kilgas were not used as portable objects as they were made of heavy stone and marble, but they were used to hold water once the water had traveled from the river to the city. While river jars and animal skins were used to transport water from the Nile to the people of Cairo, Kilgas were used to hold and store water.
