= Salsabil =

Salsabil (Arabic: سلسبيل, romanized as Salsabīl, Salsabiil, Salsabeel, Selsebil, Selsabil, Salsabiel) may refer to:

- Salsabil (Quran)
- Salsabil (fountain) with a large surface area
- Salsabil (horse)
