= Windcatcher =

Architectural element for creating a draft

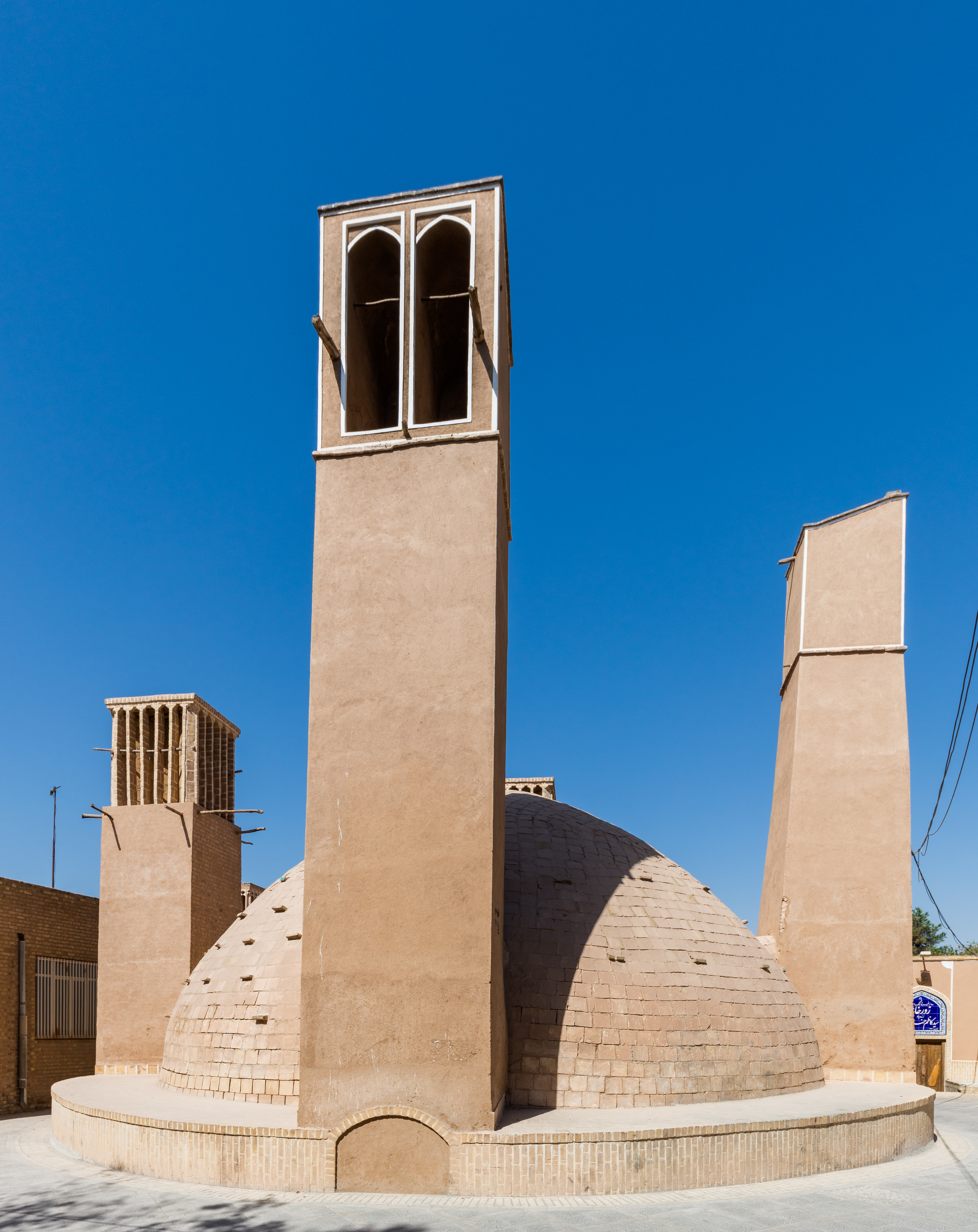
An ab anbar (water reservoir) with windcatchers (openings near the top of the towers) in the central desert city of Yazd, Iran

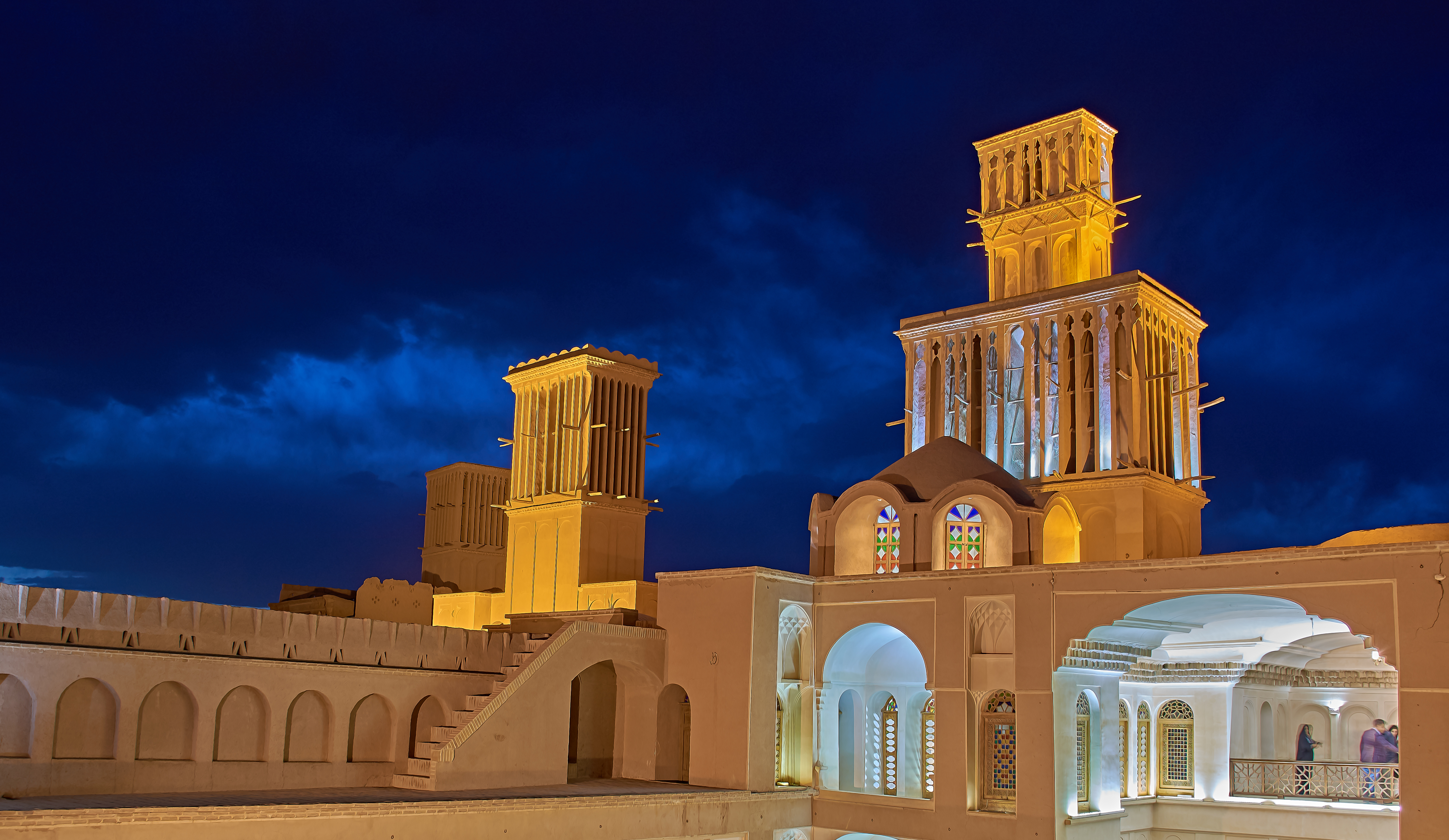
Aghazadeh Mansion in Abarkooh, Iran, has an elaborate 18-m windtower with two levels of openings, plus some smaller windtowers.

A windcatcher, wind tower, or wind scoop (Persian: بادگیر, romanized: Badgir) is a traditional architectural element used to create cross ventilation and passive cooling in buildings. Windcatchers come in various designs, depending on whether local prevailing winds are unidirectional, bidirectional, or multidirectional, on how they change with altitude, on the daily temperature cycle, on humidity, and on how much dust needs to be removed. Despite the name, windcatchers can also function without wind.

Neglected by modern architects in the latter half of the 20th century, the early 21st century saw them used again to increase ventilation and cut power demand for air-conditioning. Generally, the cost of construction for a windcatcher-ventilated building is less than that of a similar building with conventional heating, ventilation, and air conditioning (HVAC) systems. The maintenance costs are also lower. Unlike powered air-conditioning and fans, windcatchers are silent and continue to function when the electrical grid power fails (a particular concern in places where grid power is unreliable or expensive). (Note: unreliability of American grids)

Windcatchers rely on local weather and microclimate conditions, and not all techniques will work everywhere; local factors must be taken into account in design. Windcatchers of varying designs are widely used in North Africa, West Asia, and South Asia. A simple, widespread idea, there is evidence that windcatchers have been in use for many millennia, and no clear evidence that they were not used into prehistory. The "place of invention" of windcatchers is thus intensely disputed; Egypt, Iran, and the United Arab Emirates all claim it.

Windcatchers vary dramatically in shape, including height, cross-sectional area, and internal sub-divisions and filters.

Windcatching has gained some ground in Western architecture, and there are several commercial products using the name windcatcher. Some modern windcatchers use sensor-controlled moving parts or even solar-powered fans to make semi-passive ventilation and semi-passive cooling systems.

Windscoops have long been used on ships, for example in the form of a dorade box. Windcatchers have also been used experimentally to cool outdoor areas in cities, with mixed results; traditional methods include narrow, walled spaces, parks and winding streets, which act as cold-air reservoirs, and takhtabush-like arrangements (see sections on night flushing and convection, below).

== Location ==
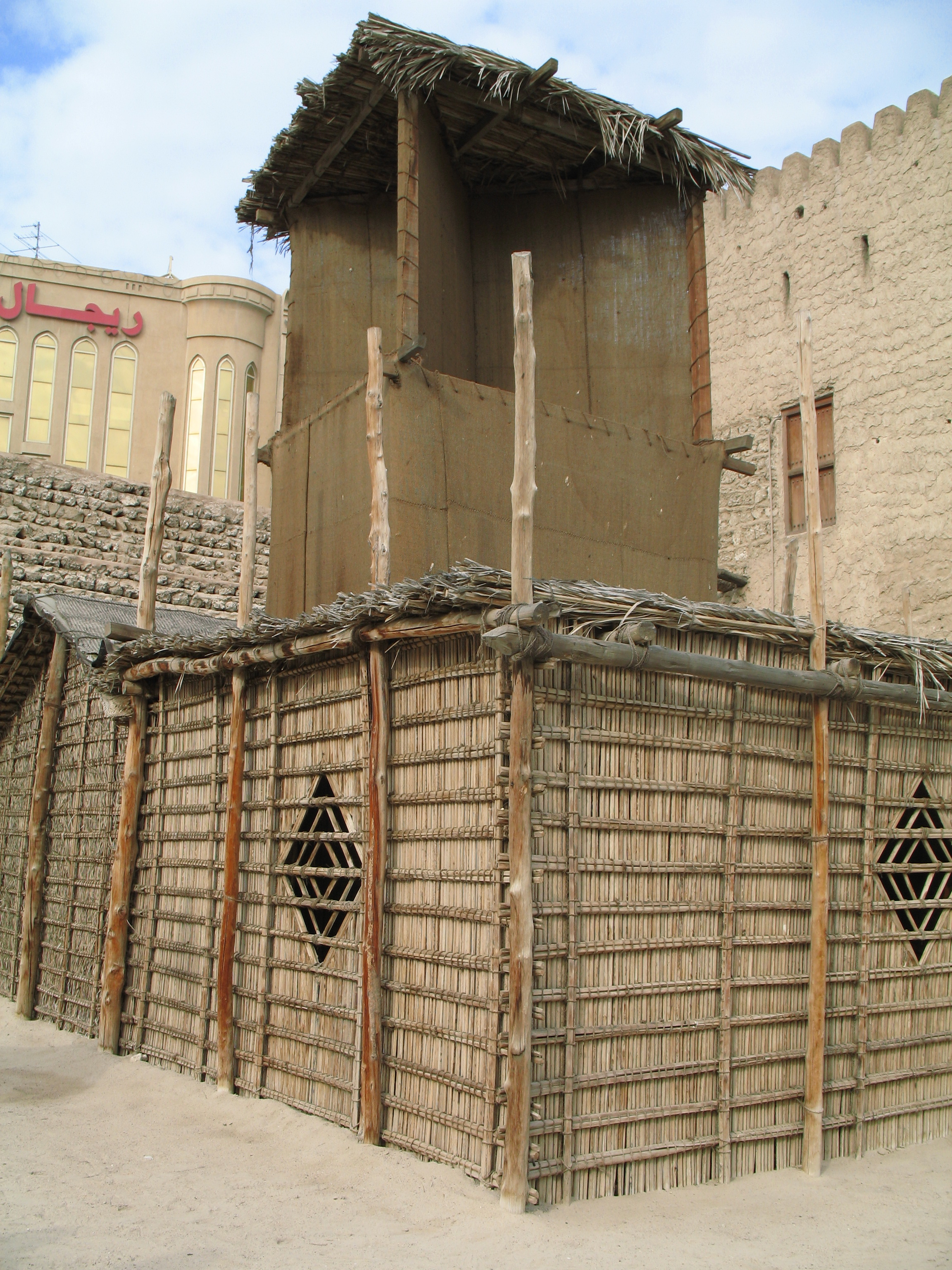
Wind tower, exterior, Dubai Museum

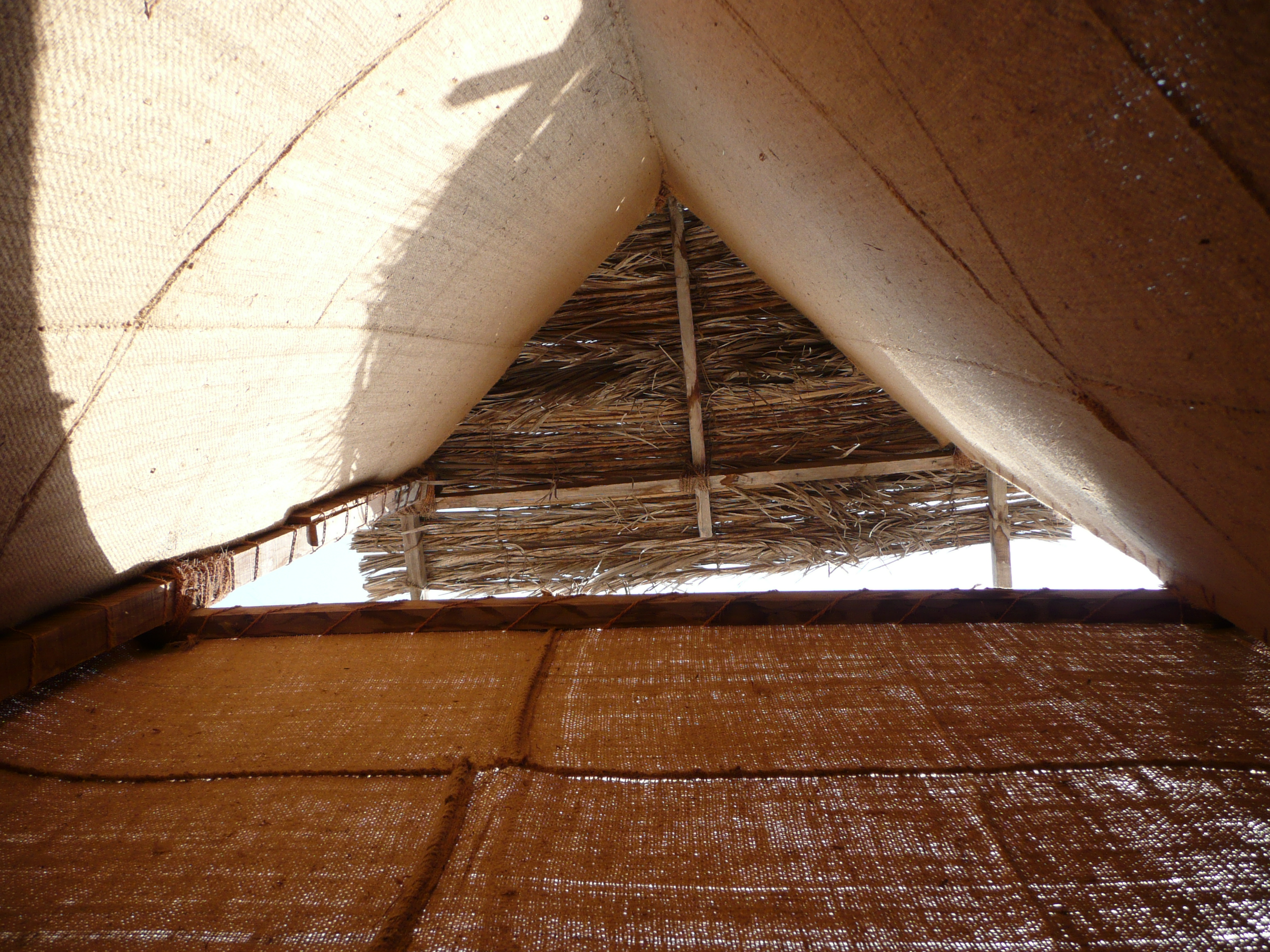
The same interior. This wind tower has four openings and brown cloth vertical walls on the interior diagonals, so it can catch the wind from a range of directions.

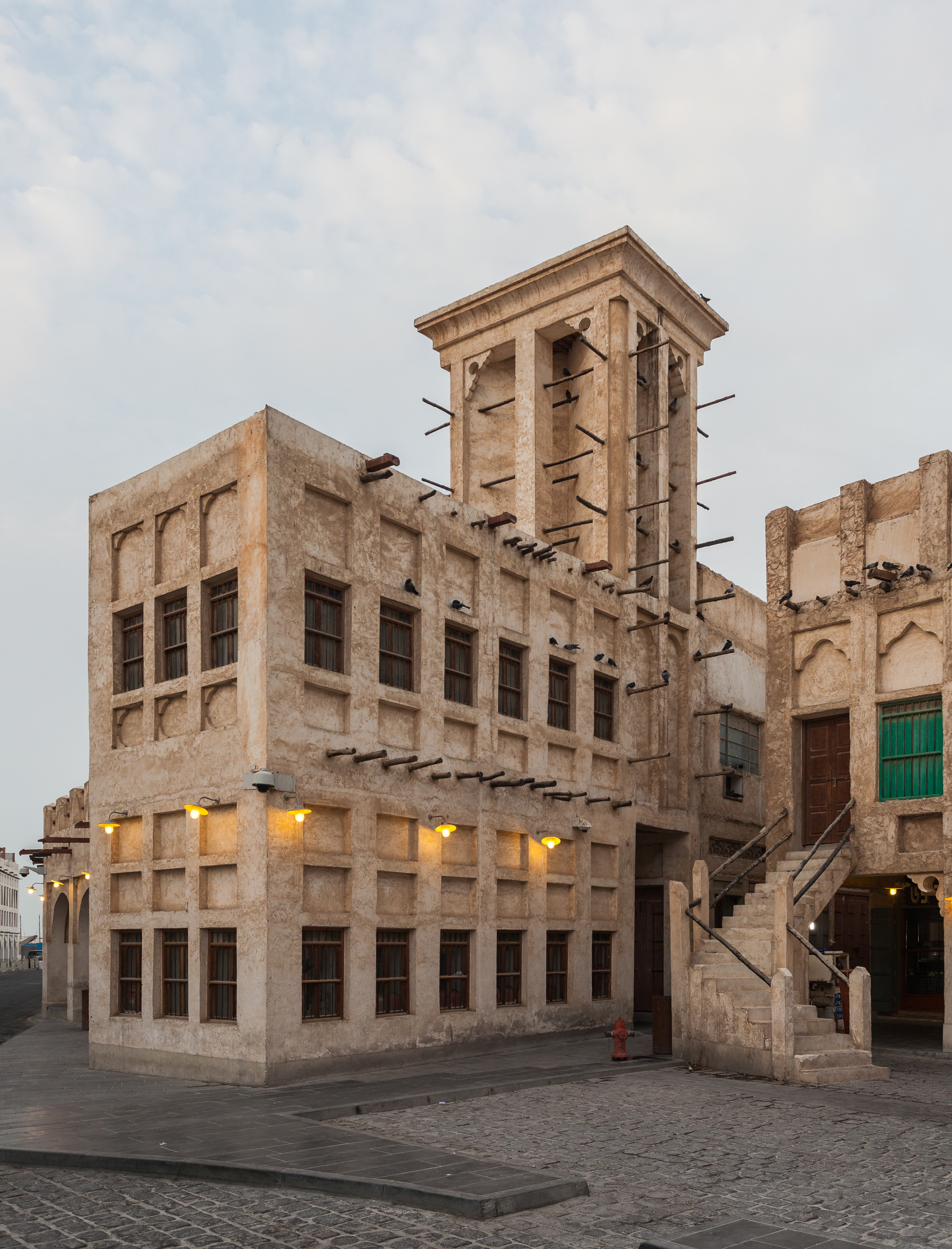
An eight-sectioned masonry windtower in Souq Waqif, Doha, Qatar

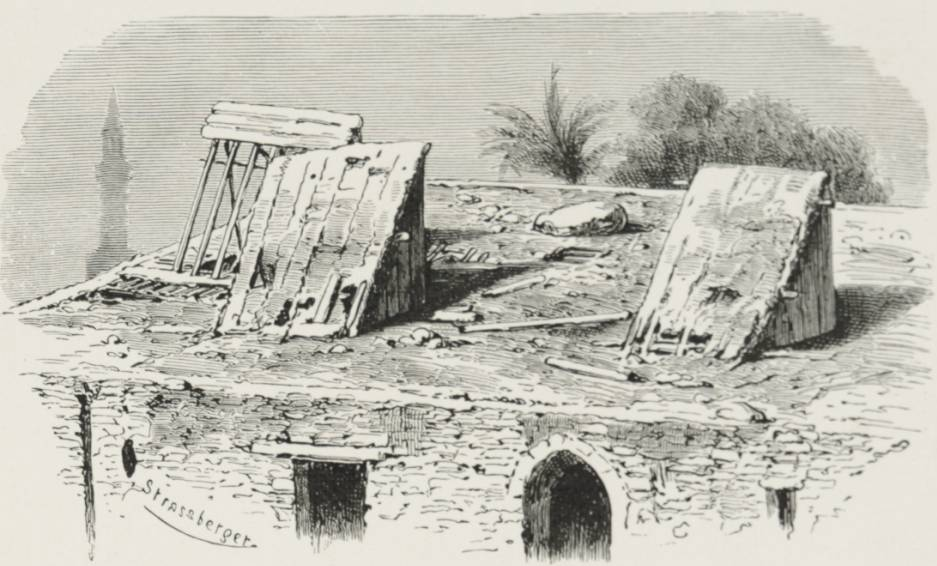
Malqafs in Egypt in 1878. Short wood-and-matting right triangular prisms, with the vertical side left open and facing directly up or down wind (often one of each per building). This design works well in areas with strong low-level winds from a consistent direction.

The construction of a windcatcher depends on the prevailing wind direction at that specific location: if the wind tends to blow from only one side, it may have only one opening, and no internal partitions. In areas with more variable wind directions, there may also be radial internal walls, which divide the windtower into vertical sections. These sections are like parallel chimneys, but with openings to the side, pointing in multiple directions. More sections reduce the flow rate, but increase the efficiency at suboptimal wind angles. If the wind hits the opening square-on, it will go in, but if it hits it at a sufficiently oblique angle, it will tend to slip around the tower, instead.

Windcatchers in areas with stronger winds will have smaller total cross-sections, and areas with very hot wind may have many smaller shafts in order to cool the incoming air. Windtowers with square horizontal cross-sections are more efficient than round ones, as the sharp angles make the flow less laminar, encouraging flow separation; suitable shaping increases suction.

Taller windcatchers catch higher winds. Higher winds blow stronger and cooler (and in a different direction). Higher air is also usually less dusty.

If the wind is dusty or polluted, or there are insect-borne illnesses such as malaria and dengue fever, then air filtering may be necessary. Some dust can be dumped at the bottom of the windcatcher as the air slows (see diagram below), and more can be filtered out by suitable plantings or insect mesh. Physical filters generally reduce throughflow, unless the flow is very gusty. It may also be possible to fully or partially close the windcatcher off.

The short, wide right-triangle-prism malqaf are usually bidirectional, set in symmetrical pairs, and are often used with a salsabil (evaporative cooling unit) and a shuksheika (roof lantern vent). Wide malqafs are more often used in damper climates, where high-volume air flow is more important compared to evaporative cooling. In hotter climates, they are narrower, and air is cooled on its way in. They are more commonly used in Africa. Baudgir, on the other hand, are multisided (usually 4-sided), and they are typically tall towers (up to 34 meters tall) which can be closed in winter. They are more common in the Persian Gulf region and in areas with dust storms. Taller windcatchers also have a stronger stack effect.

== Cooling methods ==
Night-flushing cools the house by increasing ventilation at night, when the outdoor air is cooler; windtowers can assist night flushing.

A windcatcher can also cool air by drawing it over cool objects. In arid climates, the daily temperature swings are often extreme, with desert temperatures often dipping below freezing at night. The thermal inertia of the soil evens out the daily and even annual temperature swings. Even the thermal inertia of thick masonry walls will keep a building warmer at night and cooler during the day. Windcatchers can thus cool by drawing air over night- or winter-cooled materials, which act as heat reservoirs.

Windcatchers that cool by drawing air over water use the water as a heat reservoir, but if the air is dry, they are also cooling the air with evaporative cooling. The heat in the air goes into evaporating some of the water, and will not be released until the water re-condenses. This is a very effective way of cooling dry air.

Simply moving the air also has a cooling effect. Humans cool themselves using evaporative cooling when they sweat. A draft disrupts the boundary layer of body-warmed and water-saturated air clinging to the skin, so a human will feel cooler in moving air than in stagnant air of the same temperature.

=== Airflow forces ===
A pair of short traditional windcatchers (malqaf); wind is forced down on the windward side and leaves on the leeward side. In the center, a shuksheika (roof lantern vent), used to shade the qa'a below while allowing hot air to rise out of it.

The windcatcher can function in two ways: directing airflow using the pressure of wind blowing into the windcatcher, or directing airflow using buoyancy forces from temperature gradients (stack effect). The relative importance of these two forces has been debated. The importance of windpressure increases with increasing wind speed, and is generally more important than buoyancy under most conditions in which the windcatcher is working effectively.

Airflow speed is also important, especially for evaporative cooling (since it only works on dry air, and humidifies the air). It is possible for a windtower-ventilated building to have very high flow rates; 30 air changes per hour were measured in one experiment. Uniform, stable flow with no stagnant corners is important. Turbulent flow should therefore be avoided; laminar flow is more effective at maintaining human comfort (for an extreme example, see Tesla valve).

Other elements are often used in combination with the windcatchers to cool and ventilate: courtyards, domes, walls, and fountains, for instance, as integral parts of an overall ventilation and heat-management strategy.

==== Wind pressure ====
If a windcatcher's open side faces the prevailing wind, it can "catch" it, and bring it down into the heart of the building. Suction from the lee side of a windtower is also an important driving force, usually somewhat more constant and less gusty than the pressure on the upwind side (see Venturi effect and Bernoulli's principle).

Routing the wind through the building cools the people in the building interior. The air flows through the house, and leaves from the other side, creating a through-draft; the rate of airflow itself can provide a cooling effect. Windcatchers have been employed in this manner for thousands of years.

The windtower essentially creates a pressure gradient to draw air through the building. Windtowers topped with horizontal airfoils have been built to enhance these pressure gradients. The shape of the traditional shuksheika roof also creates suction as wind blows over it.

==== Convection ====
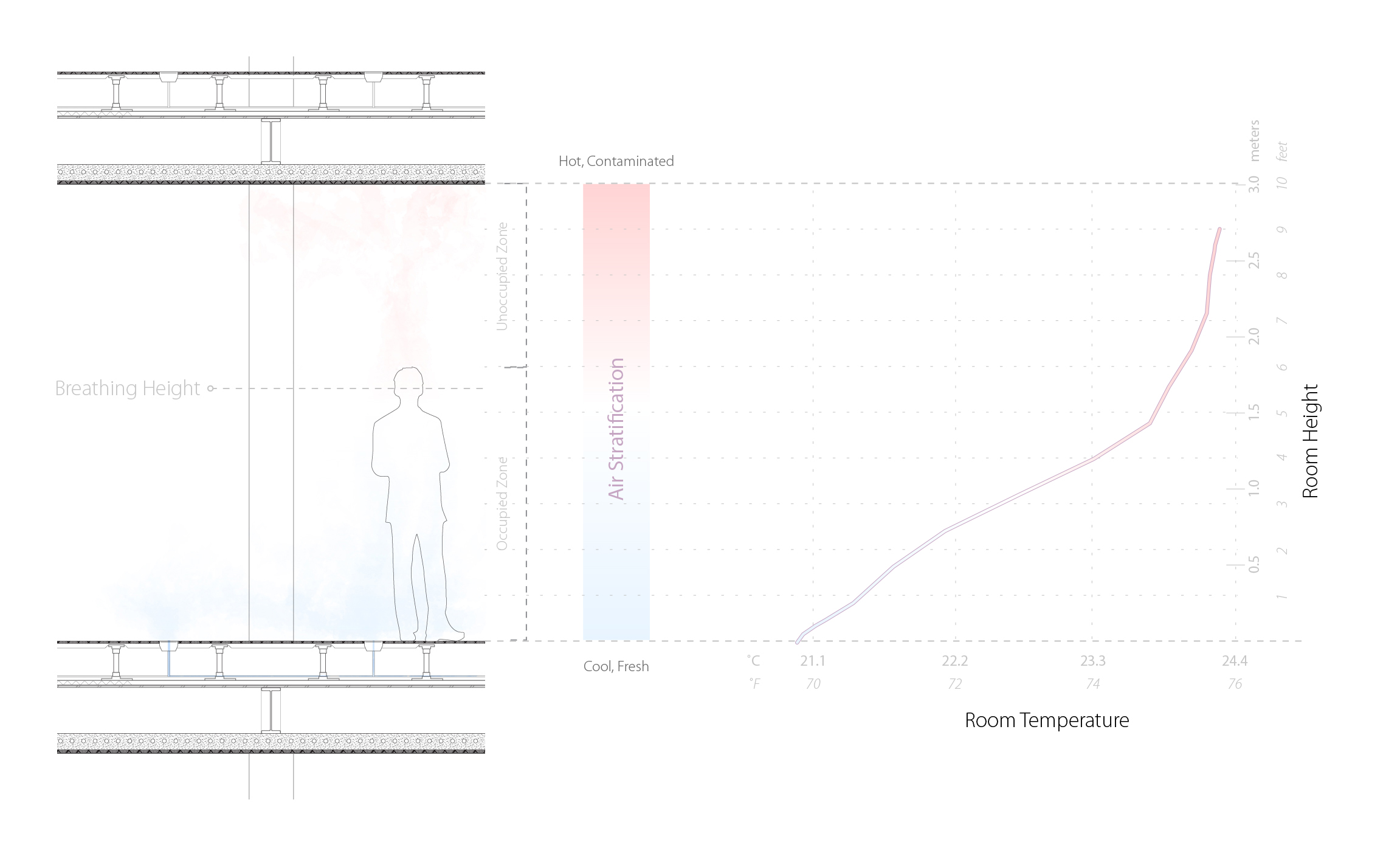
Vertical temperature gradient caused by stable stratification of air inside a room. Note hot air rising from the person.

Buoyancy is usually not the main effect driving windcatcher air circulation during the day.

In a windless environment, a windcatcher can still function using the stack effect. The hot air, which is less dense, tends to travel upwards and escape out the top of the house via the windtower.

Heating of the windtower itself can heat the air inside (making it a solar chimney and solar updraft tower), so that it rises and pulls air out of the top of the house, creating a draft. This effect can be enhanced with a heat source at the bottom of the windtower (such as humans, ~80 Watts each), but this heats the house and makes it less comfortable. A more practical technique is to cool the air as it flows down and in, using heat reservoirs and/or evaporative cooling.

A takhtabush is a space similar to the ancient Roman tablinum, opening both onto a heavily shaded courtyard and onto a rear garden court (the garden side being shaded with a mashrabiya lattice). It is designed to capture a cross-draft. The breeze is at least partly driven by convection (since one court will generally be warmer than the other), and may also be driven by wind pressure and evaporative cooling, so the garden and courtyard are used as windcatchers.

Buoyancy forces are used to cause night flushing.

==== Night flushing (colder air) ====
The diurnal temperature cycle means that the night air is colder than the daytime air; in arid climates, much colder. This creates appreciable buoyancy forces. Buildings may be designed to spontaneously increase ventilation at night.

Courtyards in hot climates fill with cold air at night. This cold air then flows from the courtyard into adjacent rooms. The cold night air will flow in easily, as it is more dense than the rising warm air it is displacing. But in the day, the courtyard walls and awning shade it, while the air outside is heated by the sun. The cool masonry will also chill the nearby air. The courtyard air will become stably stratified, the hot air floating on top of the cold air with little mixing. The fact that the openings are at the top will trap the cool air below, though it cannot cause the temperature to drop below the nightly minimum temperature. This mechanism also works in windtowers.

=== Subterranean cooling ===
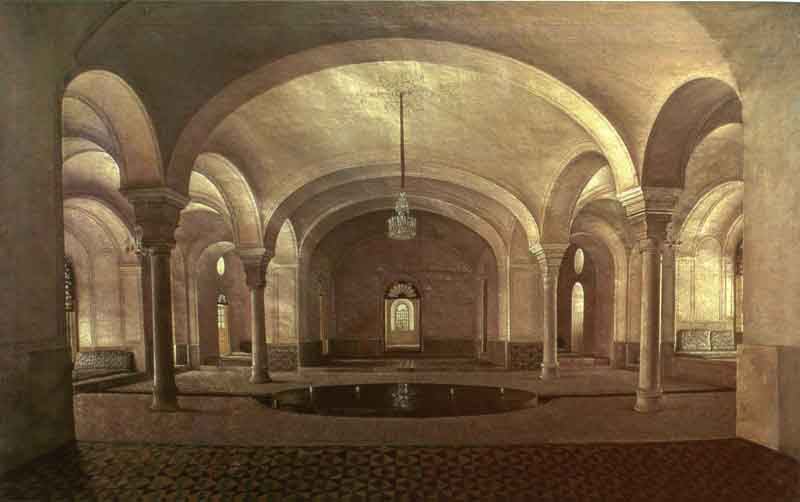
A shabestan, a cool earth-sheltered room in Iranian architecture which may be ventilated with windcatchers. The fountain pool adds evaporative cooling.

A windcatcher can also cool air by bringing it into contact with cool thermal masses. These are often found underground.

Below approximately 6m of depth, soil and groundwater is always at about the annual mean-average temperature (MATT) (it is this depth which is used for many ground-source heat pumps, often loosely referred to as "geothermal heat pumps" by laypeople). The thermal inertia of the soil evens out the daily and even annual temperature swings. In arid climates, the daily temperature swings are often extreme, with desert temperatures often dipping below freezing at night. Even the thermal inertia of thick masonry walls will keep a building warmer at night and cooler during the day; in hot-arid climates, thick walls with high thermal mass (adobe, stone, brick) are common (though thinner walls with high resistance against heat transmission are more modernly sometimes used). Windcatchers can thus cool by drawing air over night- or winter-cooled materials, which act as heat reservoirs.

Windcatchers are also often used to ventilate lower-level indoor spaces (e.g. shabestans), which maintain frigid temperatures in the middle of the day even without windcatchers. Ice houses are traditionally used to store water frozen overnight in desert areas, or over winter in temperate areas. They may use windcatchers to circulate air into an underground or semi-underground chamber, evaporatively cooling the ice so that it melts only slowly and stays fairly dry (see lede image). At night, the windcatchers may even bring sub-freezing night air underground, helping to freeze ice.

=== Evaporative cooling ===
A windcatcher and qanat used for cooling

In dry climates, the evaporative cooling effect may be used by placing water at the air intake, such that the draft draws air over water and then into the house. For this reason, it is sometimes said that the fountain, in the architecture of hot, arid climates, is like the fireplace in the architecture of cold climates.

Windcatchers are used for evaporative cooling in combination with a qanat, or underground canal (which also makes use of the subterranean heat reservoir described above). In this method, the open side of the tower faces away from the direction of the prevailing wind (the tower's orientation may be adjusted by directional ports at the top). When only the leeward side is left open, air is drawn upwards using the Coandă effect. This pulls air into an intake on the other side of the building. The hot air brought down into the qanat tunnel is cooled by coming into contact with the water flow and the surrounding earth. The soil below ground level stays cool by virtue of being several meters below the surface. The insulation and heat capacity of the overlying earth maintains the same stable temperature day and night, and as nights in arid climates are quite cold, often below freezing, that stable temperature is quite cool. The air is also evaporatively cooled when some of the water in the qanat evaporates as the hot, dry surface air passes over it; the heat energy in the air is absorbed as energy of vaporization. The dry air is thus also humidified before entering the building. The cooled air is drawn up through the house and finally out the windcatcher, again by the Coandă effect. On the whole, the cool air flows through the building, decreasing the structure's overall temperature.

A salasabil is a type of fountain with a thin sheet of flowing water, shaped to maximize surface area and thus evaporative cooling. Windcatchers are often used with salasabils may be used to maximize the flow of unsaturated air over the water surface and carry the cooled air to where it is needed in the building.

Wetted matting can also be hung inside the windcatcher to cool incoming air. This can reduce flow, especially in weak winds. However, it can also produce a downdraft of cool air in windless conditions. The evaporative cooling within a windtower causes the air in the tower to sink, driving circulation. This is called passive downdraught evaporative cooling (PDEC). It may also be generated using spray nozzles (which have a tendency to get blocked if the water is hard) or cold-water cooling coils (like hydronic underfloor heating in reverse).

== Windcatchers and climate change ==
Windcatchers can be used for mitigation of climate change as they can "reduce the building's energy consumption and carbon footprint" and for adaptation to climate change because they facilitate cooling in a warmer climate. Windcatchers can reduce temperature inside the house by 8 to 12 °C (14 to 22 °F) in comparison to the outdoor temperature.

A window windcatcher can reduce the total energy use of a building by 23.3%.

== Regional use ==
=== Africa ===
==== Egypt ====
In Egypt windcatchers are known as malqaf, pl. malaaqef. They are generally shaped as right triangular prisms with the vertical side left open and facing directly up or down wind (one of each per building). They work best if oriented within 10 degrees of wind direction; larger angles allow the wind to escape. Windcatchers were used in traditional ancient Egyptian architecture, and only started to fall out of use in the mid-20th century. Their use is now being re-examined, as air conditioning accounts for 60% of Egypt's peak electrical power demand (and thus the need for 60% of its generating capacity).

Windcatchers in Egypt are often used in conjunction with other passive cooling elements.

models

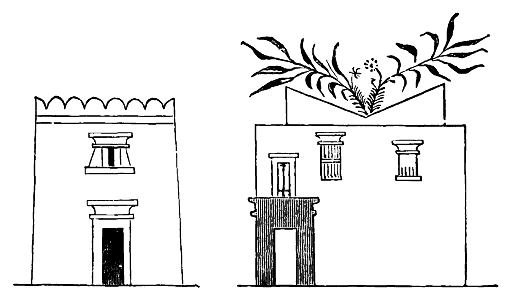
Dwelling house in Ancient Egypt with windcatcher. From a painting at the Pharaonic house of Neb-Ammun, Egypt, which dates from the 19th Dynasty, c. 1300 BC (British Museum).

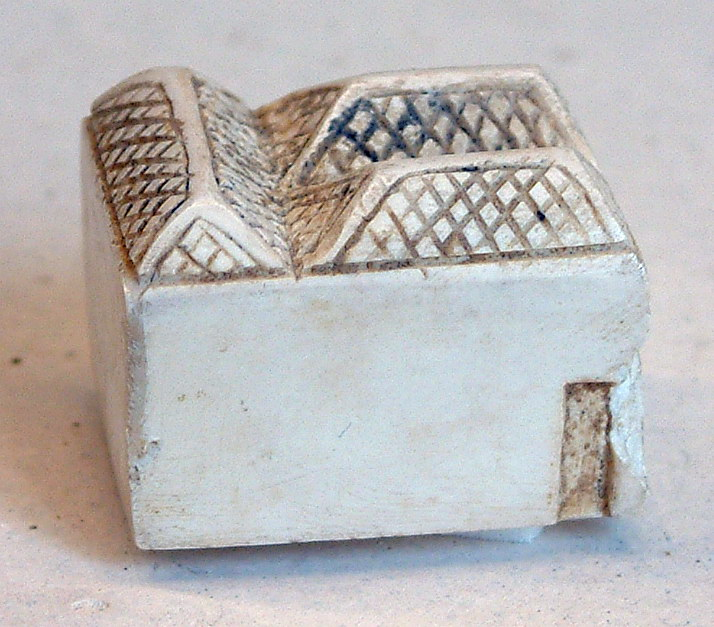
Ancient Egyptian House miniature showing windcatchers, dating from Early Dynastic Period of Egypt, found in Abou Rawsh near Cairo. Now in Louvre.

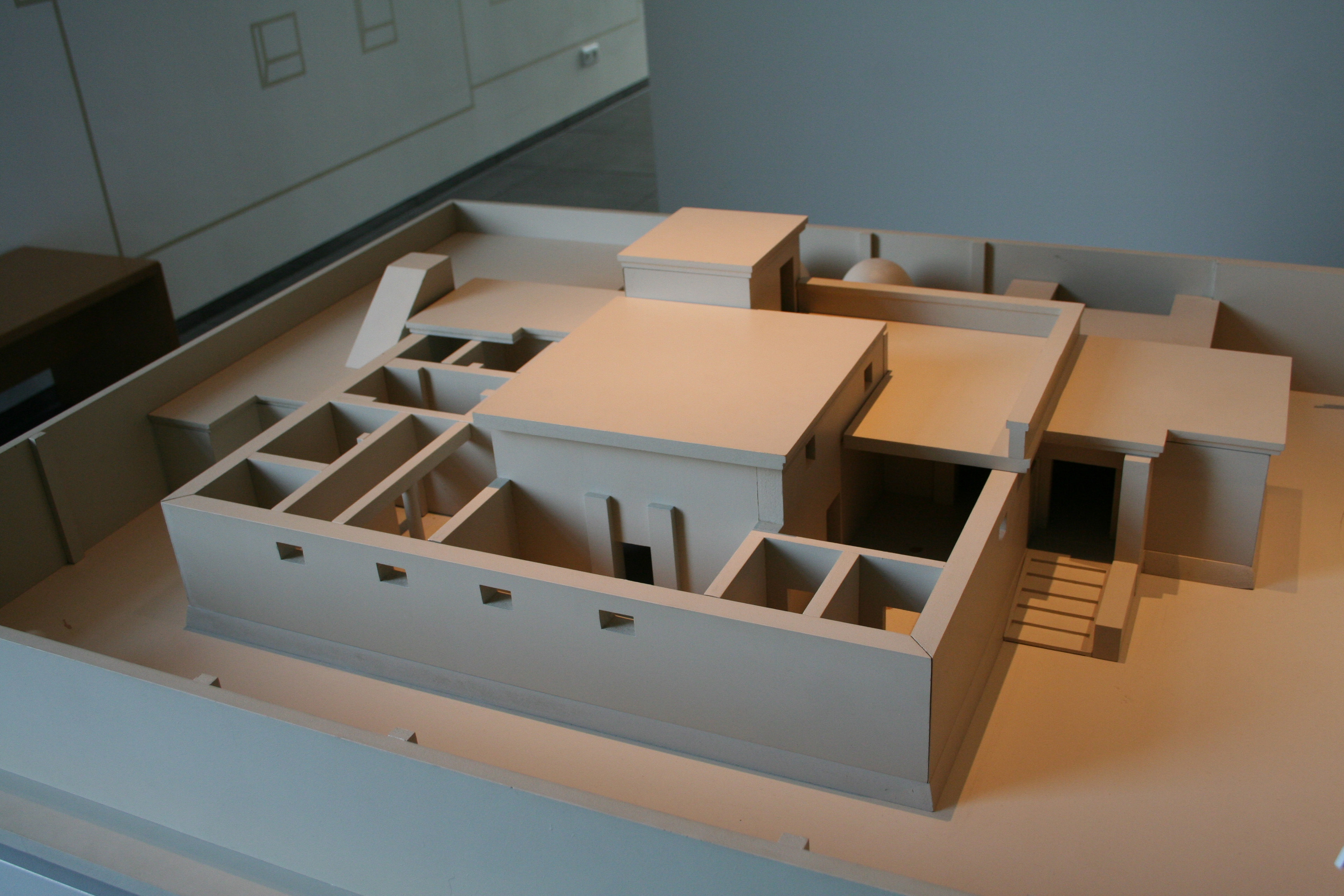
Model of an Ancient Egyptian house with windcatcher, Roemer- und Pelizaeus-Museum Hildesheim
cityscapes

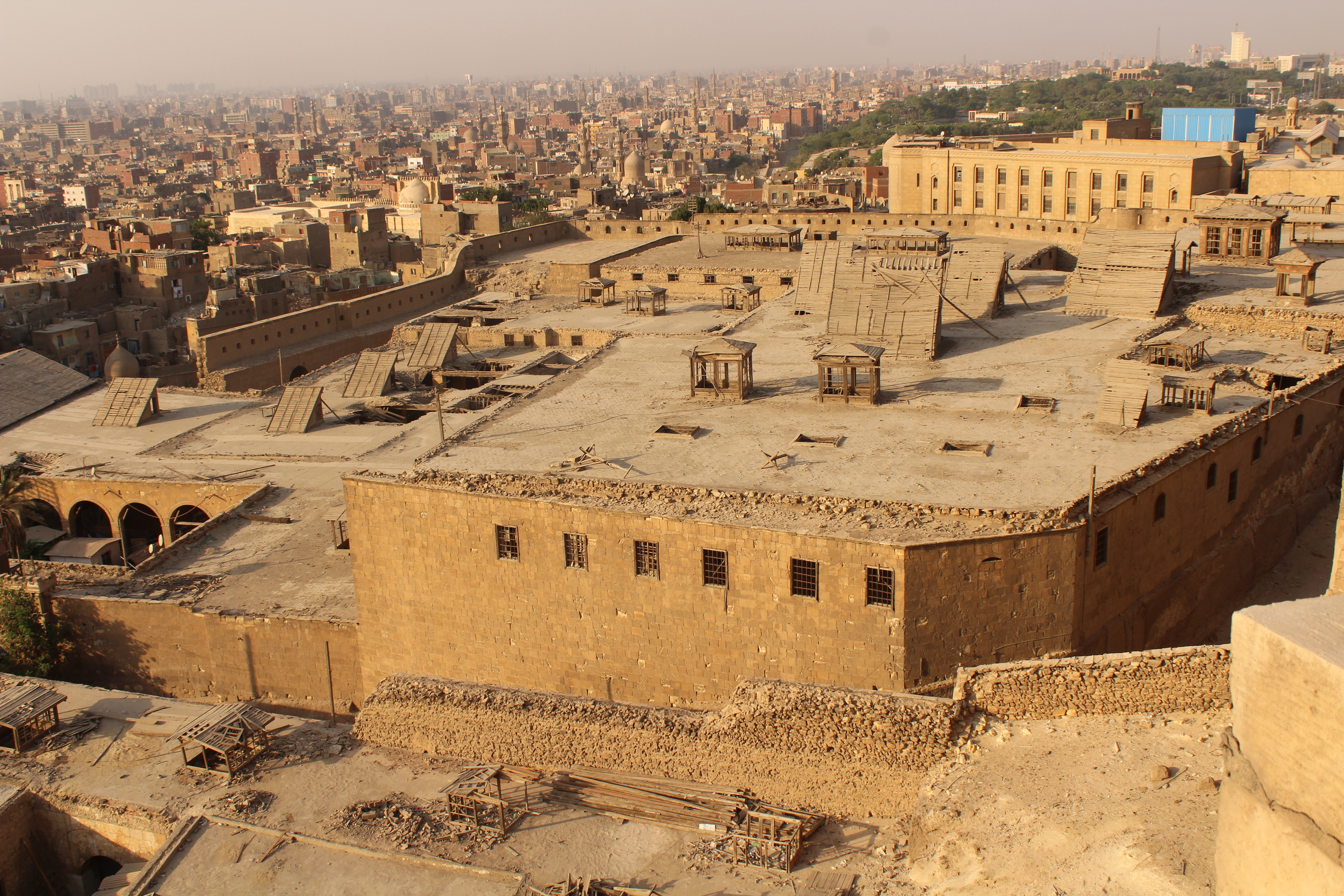
Windcatchers and shuksheika roofs shading narrow airshaft courtyards, Cairo Citadel

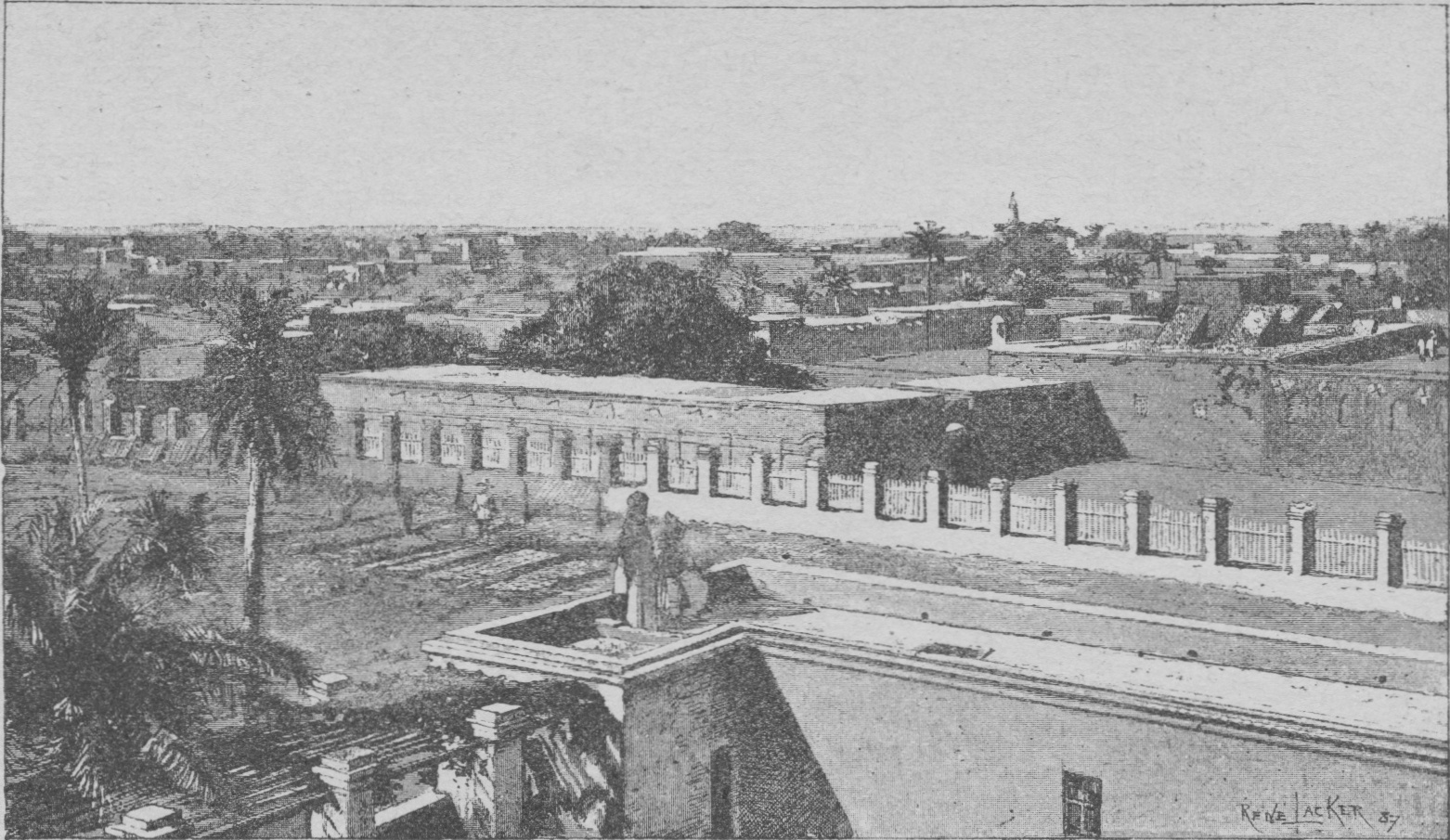
Windcatchers in Khartoum, Sudan

=== Asia ===
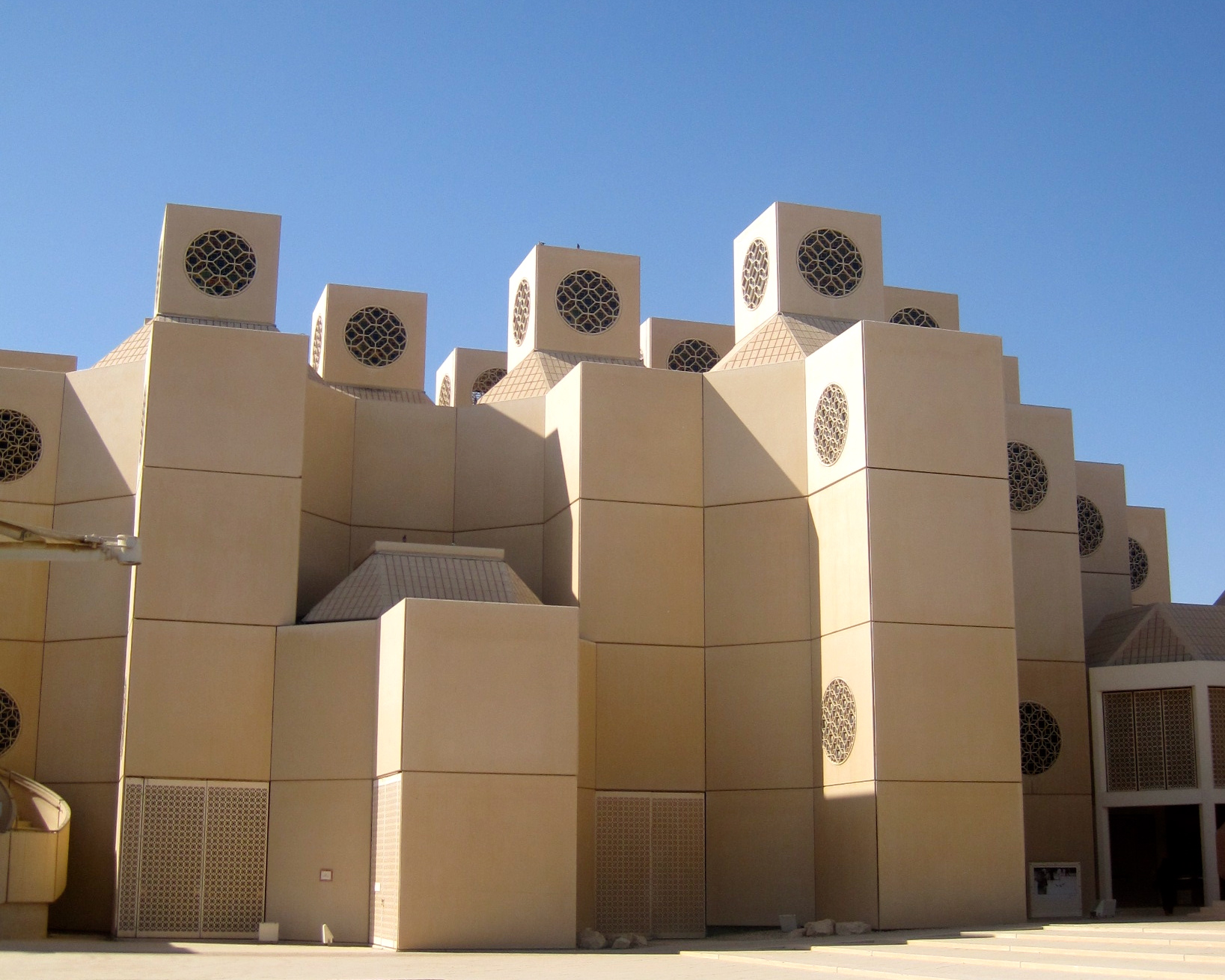
The University of Qatar in Doha has unusual windcatchers.

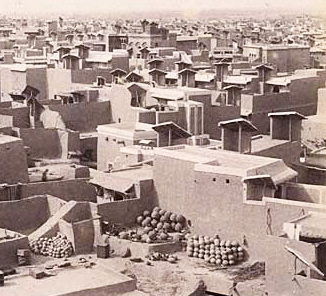
Simple windcatchers in Hyderabad, Pakistan, in the 1800s: two-walled square towers with a diagonally-sloped skillion rooves

Windcatchers are a common feature in West and South Asia, influenced by the spread of Islamic culture.

==== Iran ====
External videos
- Iranian city uses ancient techniques to defy summer heat - AFP . Iranian city uses ancient techniques to defy summer heat - AFP

In Iran, a windcatcher is called a bâdgir, bâd "wind" + gir "catcher" (Persian: بادگیر). The devices were used in Achaemenid architecture. They are used in the hot, dry areas of the Central Iranian Plateau, and in the hot, humid coastal regions.

Central Iran shows large diurnal temperature variation with an arid climate. Most buildings are constructed from thick ceramic with high insulation values. Towns centered on desert oases tend to be packed very closely together with high walls and ceilings, maximizing shade at ground level. The heat of direct sunlight is minimized with small windows that face away from the sun.

The windcatcher's effectiveness had led to its routine use as a refrigerating device in Iran. Many traditional water reservoirs (ab anbars), which are capable of storing water at near-freezing temperatures during summer months, are built with windcatchers. The evaporative cooling effect is strongest in the driest climates, such as on the Iranian plateau, leading to the ubiquitous use of windcatchers in drier areas such as Yazd, Kerman, Kashan, Sirjan, Nain, and Bam.

Windcatchers tend to have one, four, or eight openings. In the city of Yazd, all windcatchers are four- or eight-sided. The construction of a windcatcher depends on the direction of airflow at that specific location: if the wind tends to blow from only one side, it is built with only one downwind opening. This is the style most commonly seen in Meybod, 50 kilometers from Yazd: the windcatchers are short and have a single opening.

Windcatchers in Iran may be quite elaborate, due to their use as status symbols.

A small windcatcher is called a shish-khan in traditional Persian architecture. Shish-khans can still be seen on top of ab anbars in Qazvin and other northern cities in Iran. These seem to function more as ventilators than as the temperature regulators seen in the central deserts of Iran.

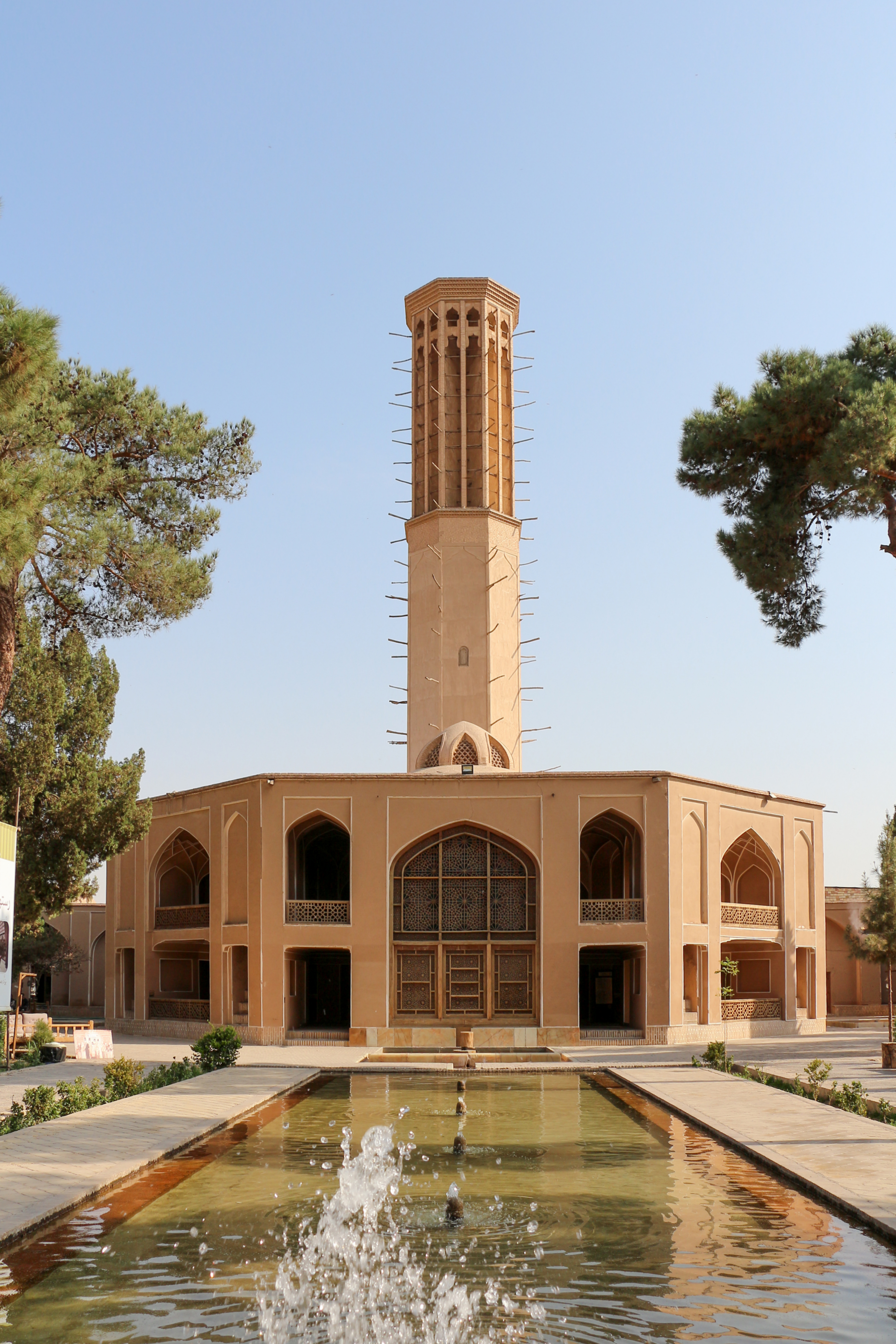
The windcatcher of Dowlatabad Garden in Yazd, Iran: one of the tallest existing windcatchers

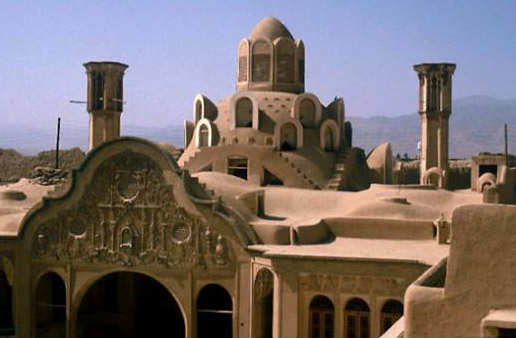
Borujerdi House, in Kashan, central Iran. Built in 1857, it is an excellent example of ancient Persian desert architecture. The two tall windcatchers cool the andaruni (courtyard) of the house.

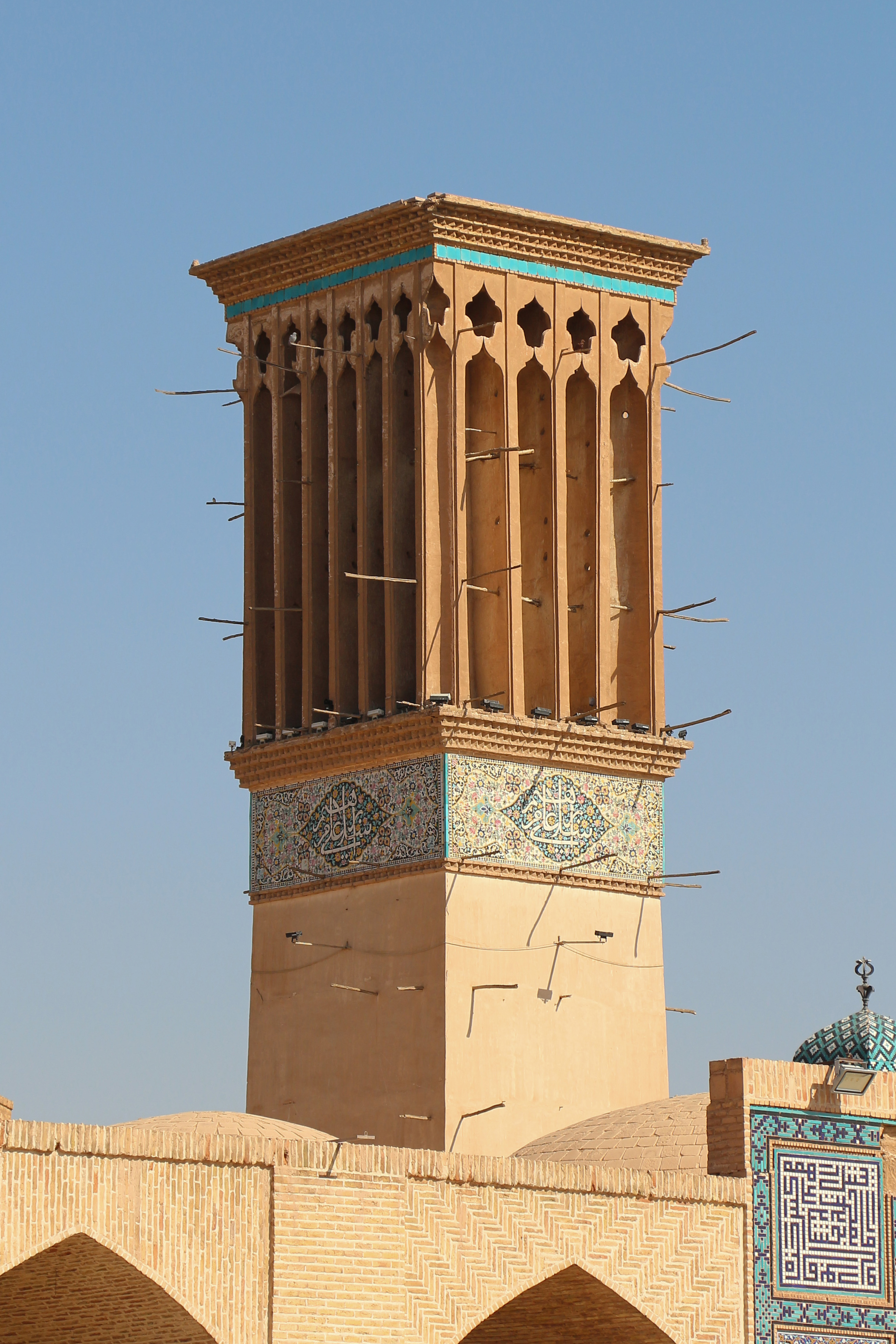
Windcatcher of Ganjali Khan Complex, in Kerman, Iran

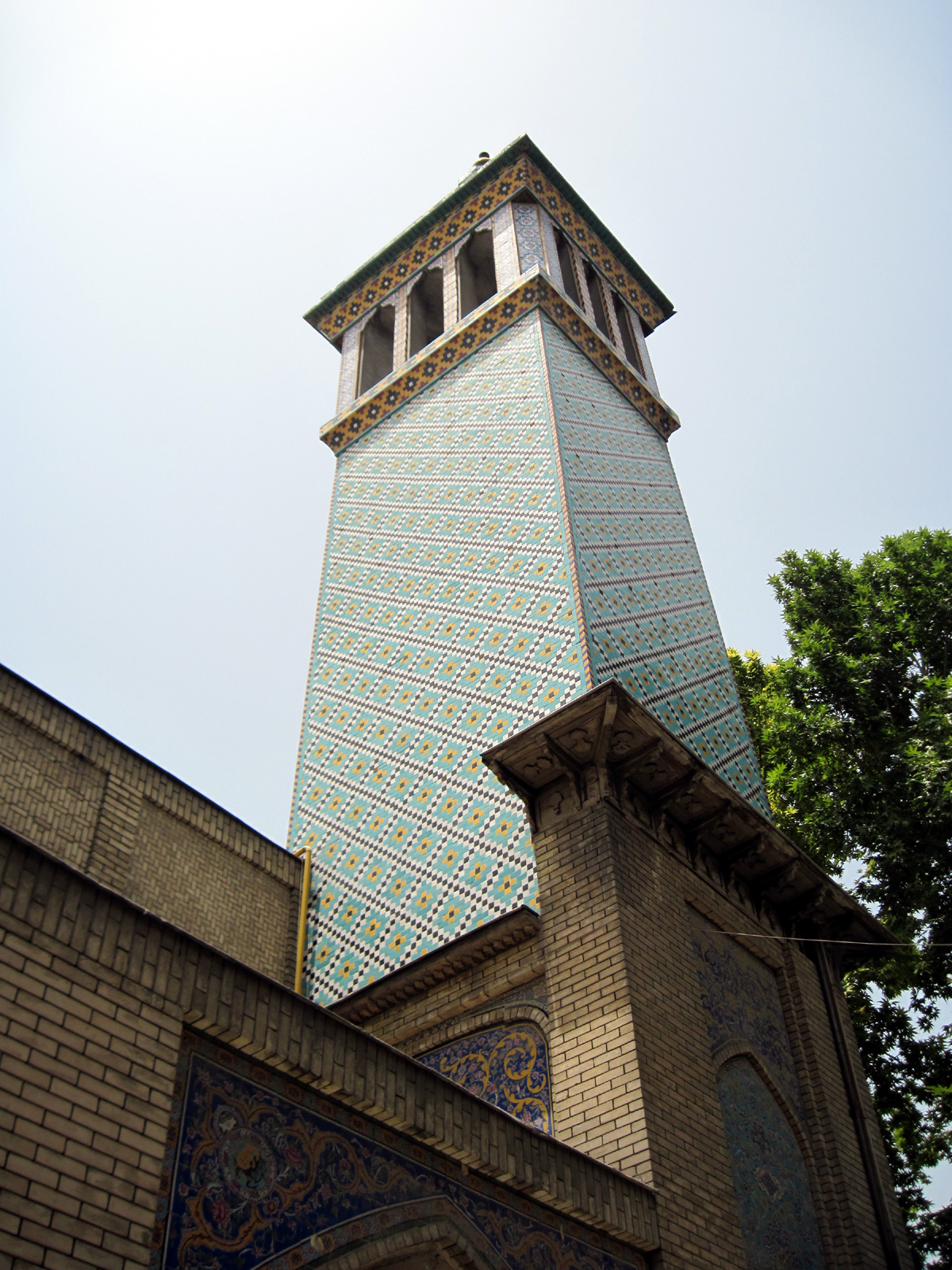
Golestan Palace, in Tehran, Iran

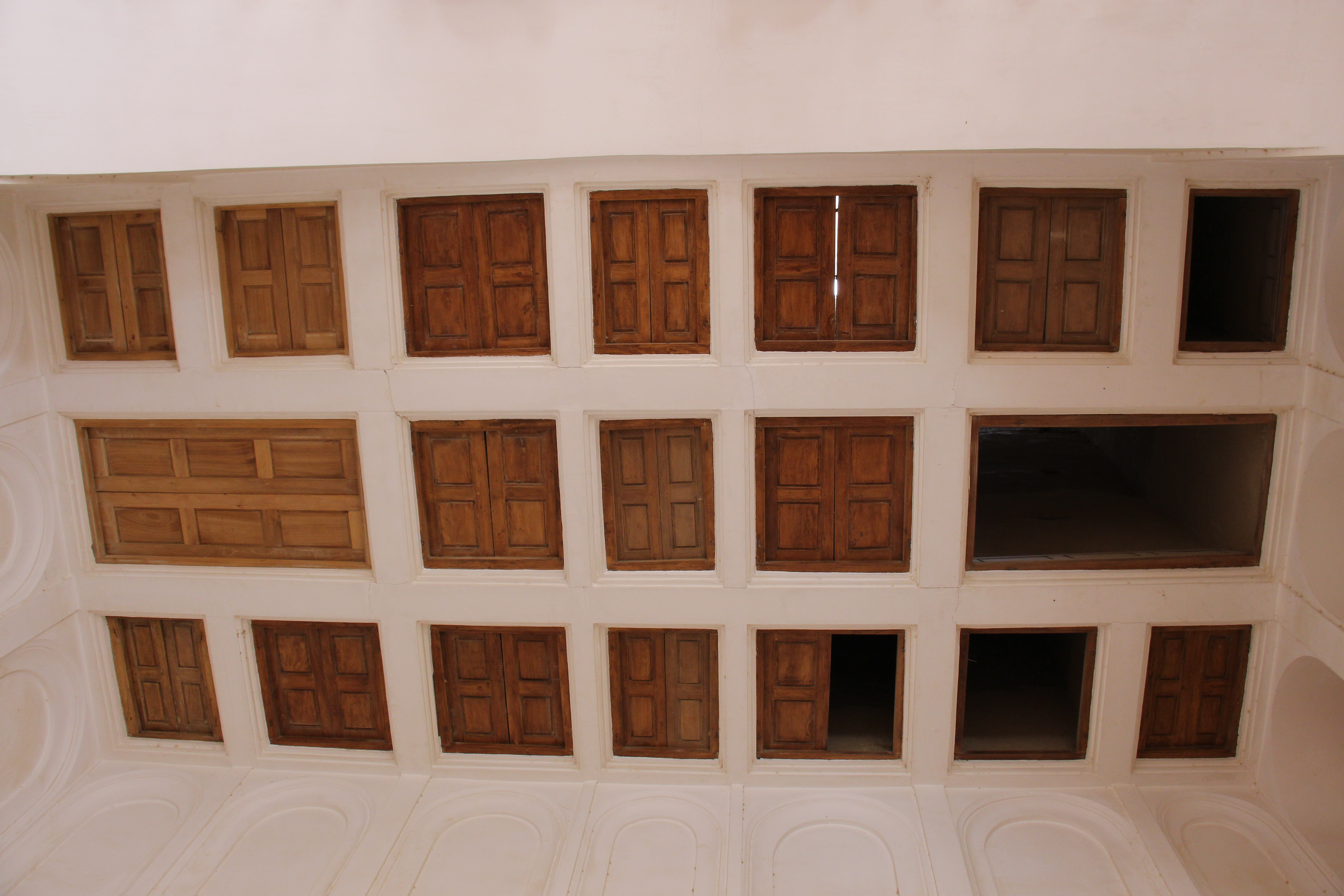
A windtower from below, interior view, showing that it is partly closed off

=== Australia ===
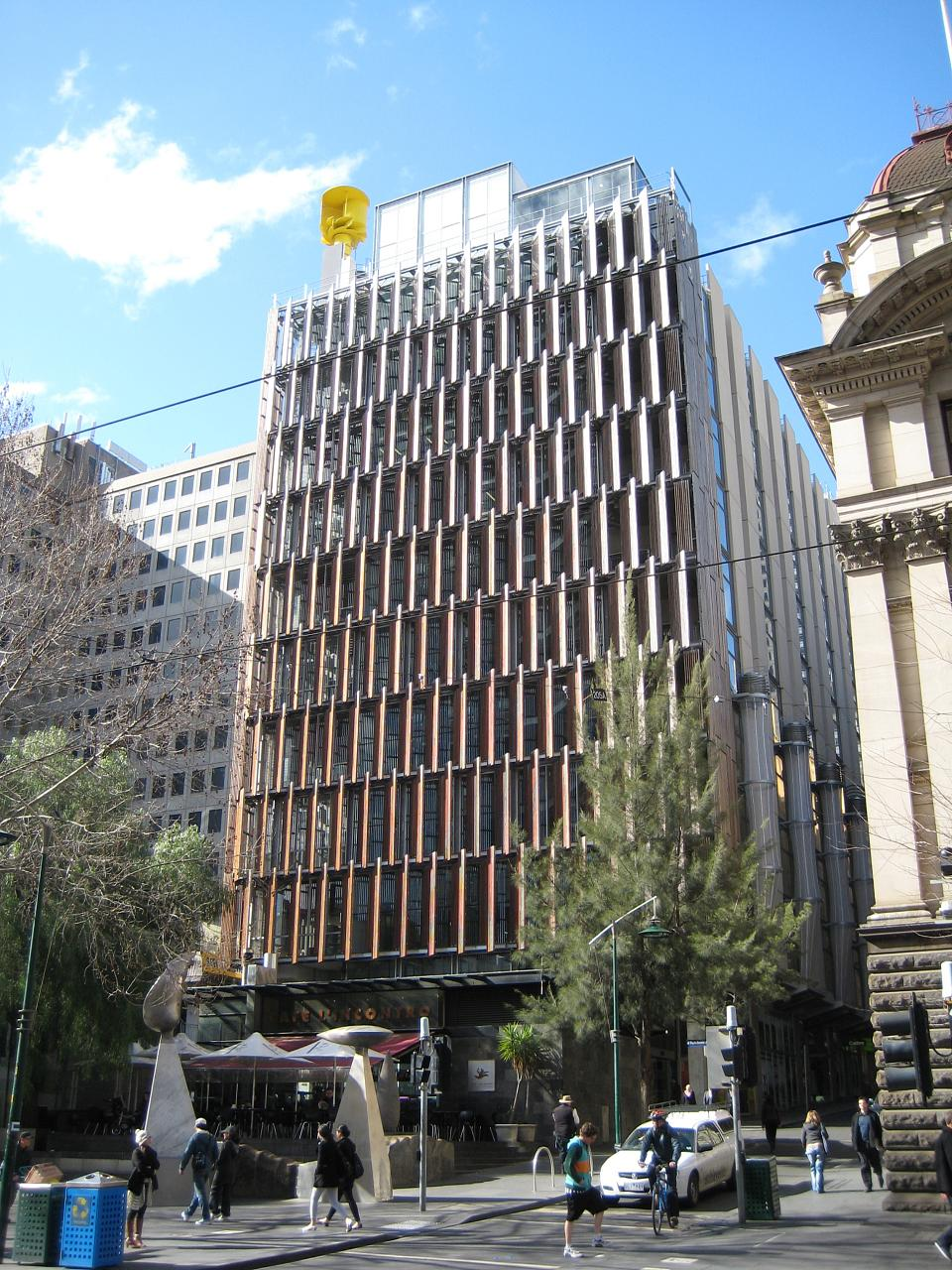
Council House 2. Wind towers in concrete canyon to the left.

Council House 2 in Melbourne, Australia, has 3-story-tall "shower towers", made of cloth kept wet by a showerhead trickling at the top of each one. Evaporative cooling chills the air, which then descends into the building.

=== Europe ===
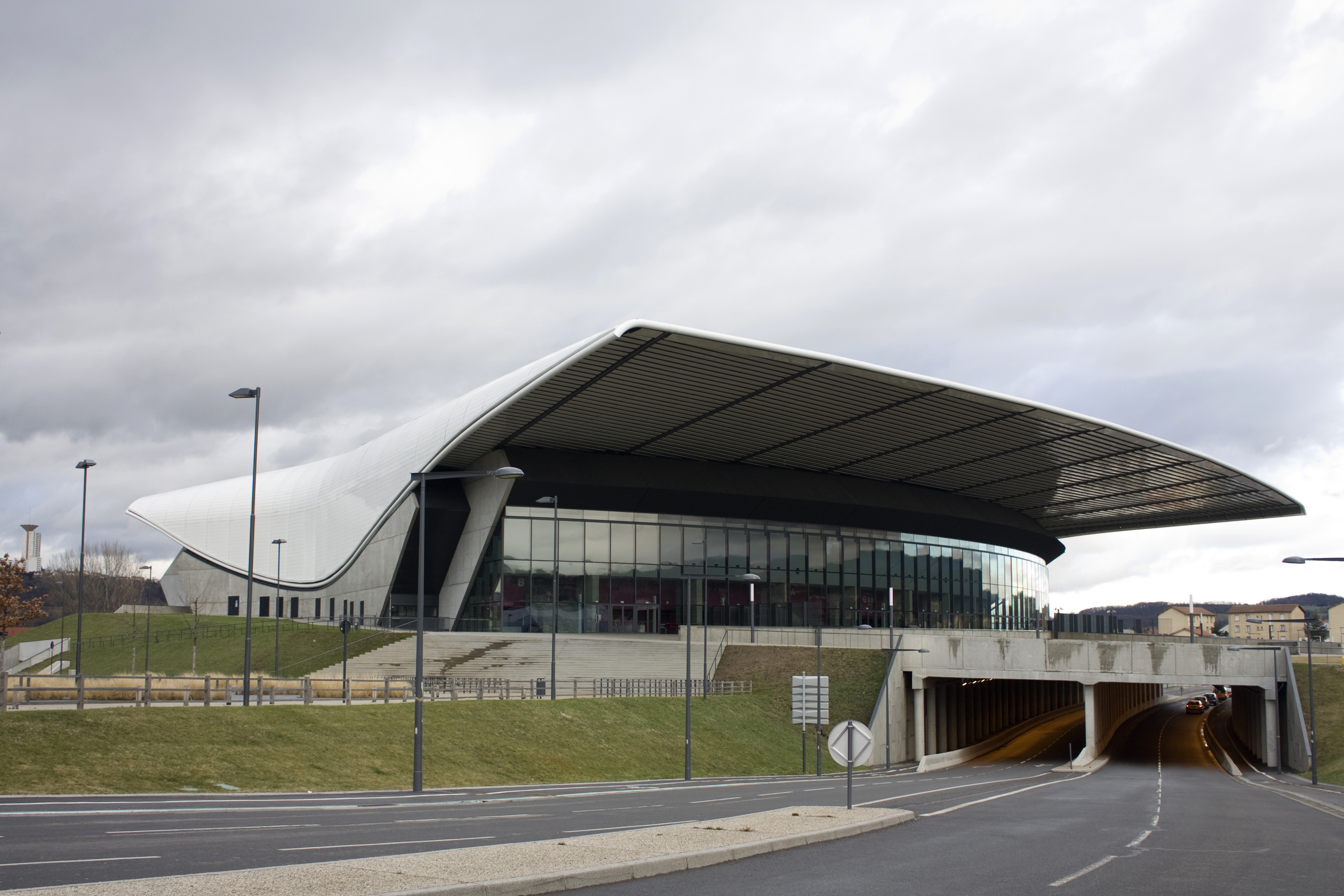
The Zénith de Saint-Étienne Métropole has an extremely wide aluminium windcatcher scoop.

==== France ====
The Saint-Étienne Métropole's Zénith is a multi-purpose hall built in Auvergne-Rhône-Alpes (inland southern France). It incorporates a very large aluminium windcatcher, which is much lighter than the equivalent masonry windcatcher would be. The size of the windcatcher allows it to work in any wind direction; the cross-sectional area perpendicular to the wind flow remains large.

==== United Kingdom ====
The Bluewater Shopping Centre in Kent uses windcatcher towers. The Queen's Building of De Montfort University in Leicester uses stack-effect towers to ventilate.

=== Americas ===
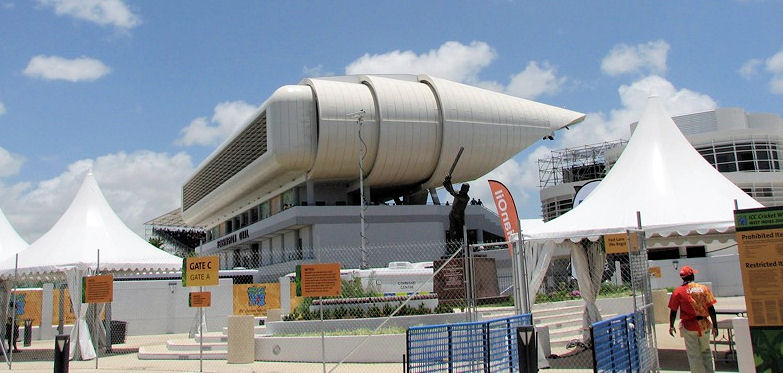
The Kensington Oval cricket ground in Barbados also uses a very wide aluminium windscoop.

A windcatcher has been used in the visitor center at Zion National Park, Utah, where it functions without the addition of mechanical devices in order to regulate temperature.

== See also ==
- Ridge vent – Vent installed at the peak of a sloped roof
- Passive cooling – Building design approach
- Qanat – Water supply system developed in ancient Iran
- Salsabil (fountain) – Thin-sheet fountain for evaporatively cooling buildings or water
- Solar updraft tower – Thermal convection power plant
- Vernacular architecture – Architecture based on local needs, materials, traditions
- Yakhchal – Ancient Persian ice house
