= Salsabil (Quran) =

Arabic term referring to a spring or fountain in paradise

Salsabil (Arabic: سلسبيل, romanized as Salsabīl, Salsabiil, Salsabeel, Selsebil, Selsabil, Salsabiel) is an Arabic term referring to a spring or fountain in paradise, mentioned in the Qur'an and in some hadiths. The term is also used as a common and proper noun.

== In the Quran ==
In the Quran, the word is used once, to refer to a spring or fountain in paradise (Jannah). The sole quranic reference is in sura Al-Insan. There is also mention in some hadith.

وَيُسْقَوْنَ فِيهَا كَأْسًا كَانَ مِزَاجُهَا زَنْجَبِيلًا (17) عَيْنًا فِيهَا تُسَمَّىٰ سَلْسَبِيلًا (18)

wayusqawna fīhā kaʾsan kāna mizājuhā zanjabīlan (17) ʿaynan fīhā tusammā salsabīlan (18)

"And there they will be given a cup whose mixture is of Zanjabiil [ginger]. A fountain there, called Salsabiil."

— Quran, sura 76 (Al-Insan), ayat 17-18

The verse may be in reference to the previous verse concerning the drink provided to those who enter paradise. "Salsabil" is usually but not always considered to be used as a proper noun, not a common noun, in this verse (that is, the capitalized name of one specific water source). The common noun is used in Hindustani to mean "[r]unning limpid, sweet water", and in Persian for a pleasant beverage.

== Derivations ==
The Qur'anic term is probably the source of the engineering use of "salsabil", to designate a type of fountain. This is used for aerating drinking water in a sebil, for evaporative cooling of a building, or both.

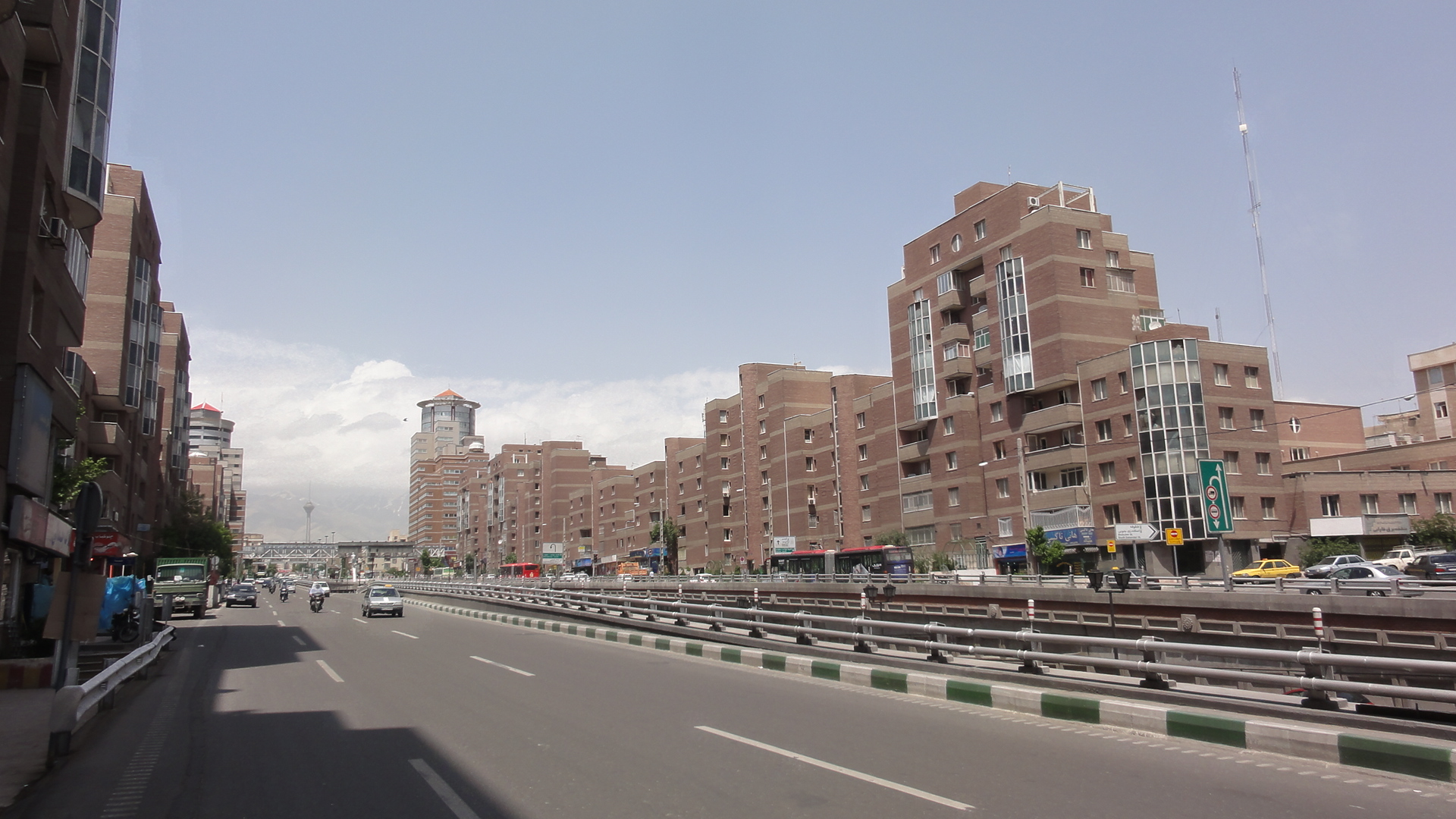
Part of the Salsabil neighborhood in Tehran

Like many terms found in the Quran, it is used as a proper name given to people, as both a personal or as a family name. It is also the name of one of the old neighborhoods in Tehran, Iran.

== See also ==
- Salsabil (fountain) (for cooling)
- Sebil (for drinking)
- Shadirvan (for wudu, ablutions)
