= Salsabil (fountain) =

Thin-sheet fountain for evaporatively cooling buildings or water

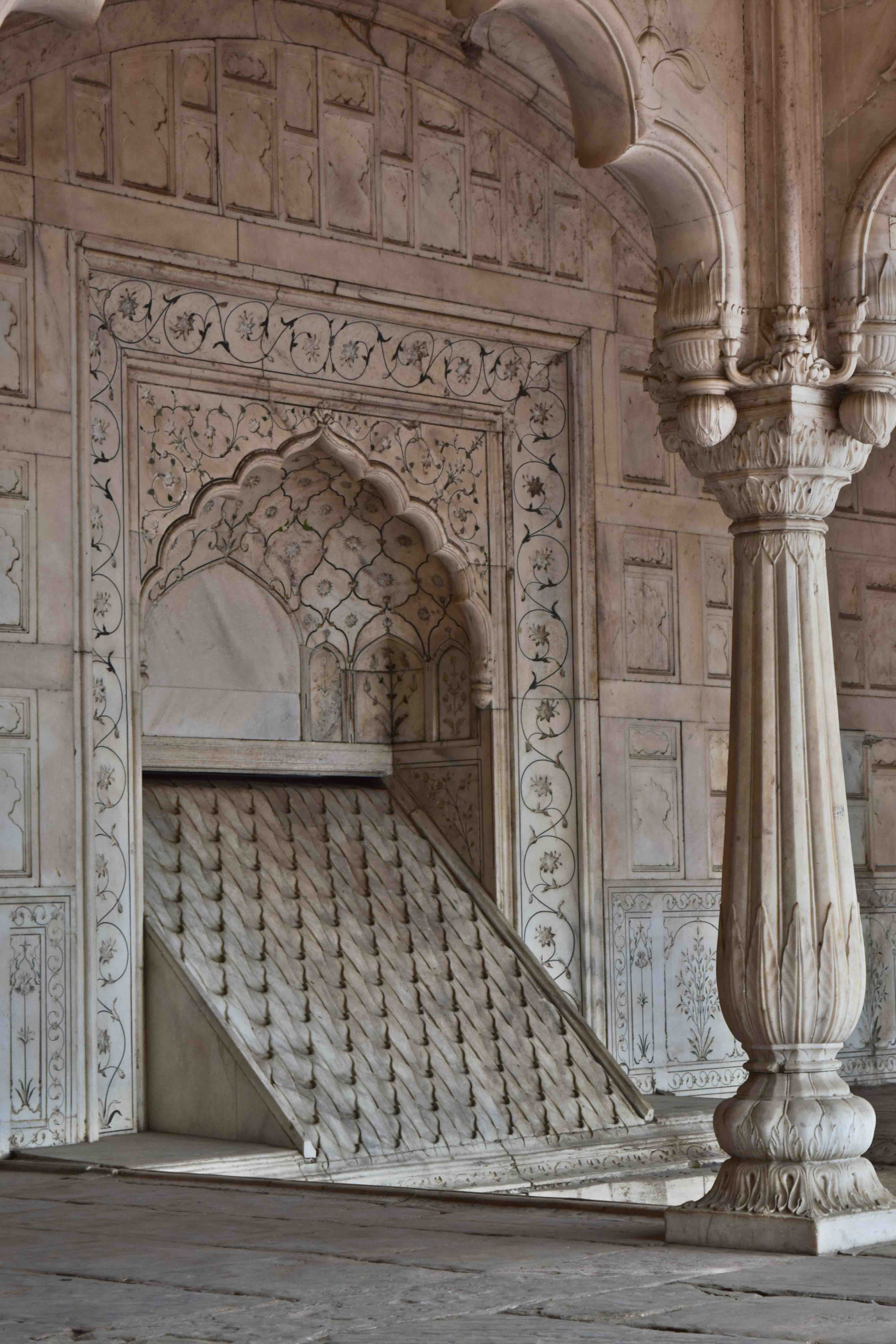
A salasabil (currently dry) in the Red Fort in Delhi, India.

A salsabil (or salasabil), also known as a shadirwan, is a type of fountain which maximizes the surface area of the water. It is used for evaporative cooling of buildings, cooling and aeration of drinking water, and ornament (it has also been used to prevent eavesdropping). The water may flow in a thin sheet or thin streams, often over a wavy surface with many little waterfalls. Its use extends from southern Spain through North Africa and West Asia to northern India.

== Etymology and name ==
The name salsabil (Arabic: سلسبيل) likely derives from a Qur'anic reference. The term shadirwan is also used for devices for aerating drinking water. However, the term shadirwan or shadirvan (Arabic: شاذروان, Persian: شادروان, Turkish: şadırvan) has slightly different uses in other cultures, such as designating a central ablutions fountain for a mosque courtyard in Turkish (see shadirvan).

== Design and setting ==
The water flows in a manner designed to maximize the surface area, and thus evaporation. A salsabil may be a near-vertical marble waterfall mounted on a wall, or the sheet of water may flow down a slanted chute.

Evaporative cooling causes the water and the surrounding air to cool as some of the water evaporates. Passive ventilation may be used to maximize the flow of unsaturated air over the water surface and carry the cooled air to where it is needed in the building. Salasabils are often used with windcatchers.

A salsabil may also be used to aerate water for drinking in a sabil (or sebil; Arabic: سبيل, Turkish: sebil). Salsabils, in the form of inclined marble slabs over which drinking water flowed before being dispensed, were often included inside the sabils of Mamluk architecture.

Salasabils were used in Mughal architecture from the 1200s to the 1600s. They were also used in recent centuries in Iran. They were sometimes used as decorative features in Ottoman domestic architecture.

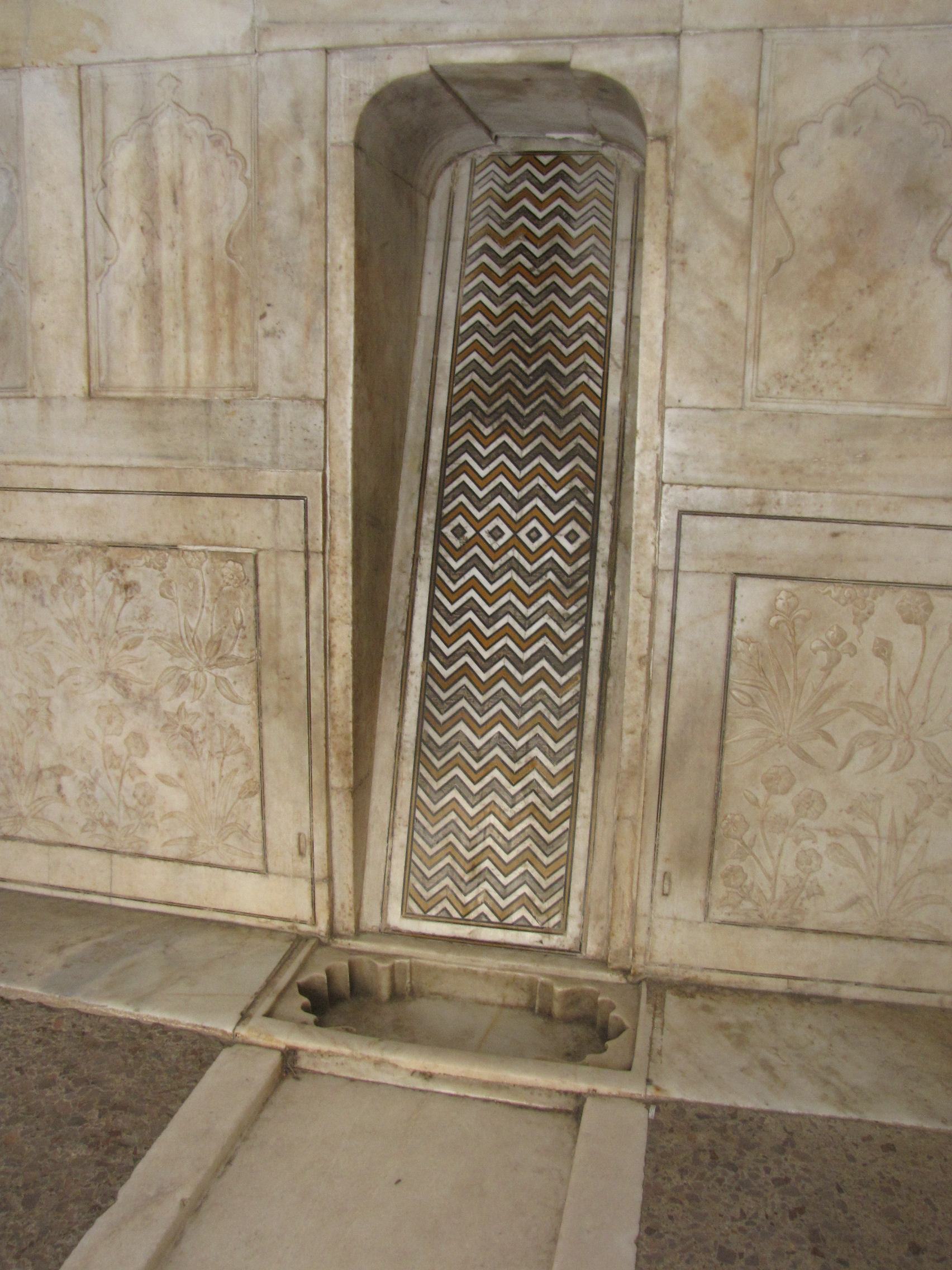
Near-vertical salasabil in the mostly-1500s Agra Fort (dry)

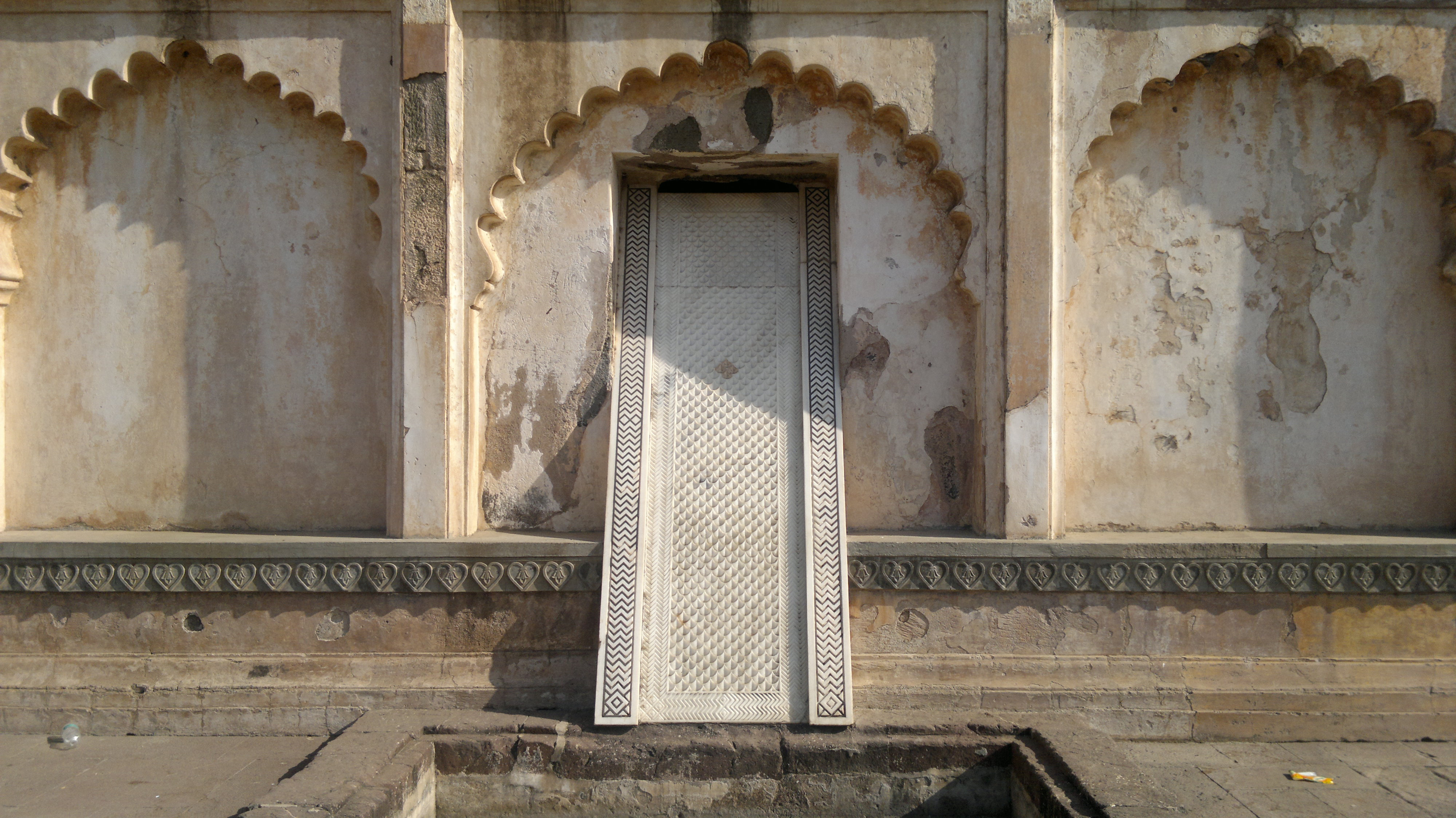
1660s Bibi Ka Maqbara, Aurangabad, Maharashtra, India (dry)

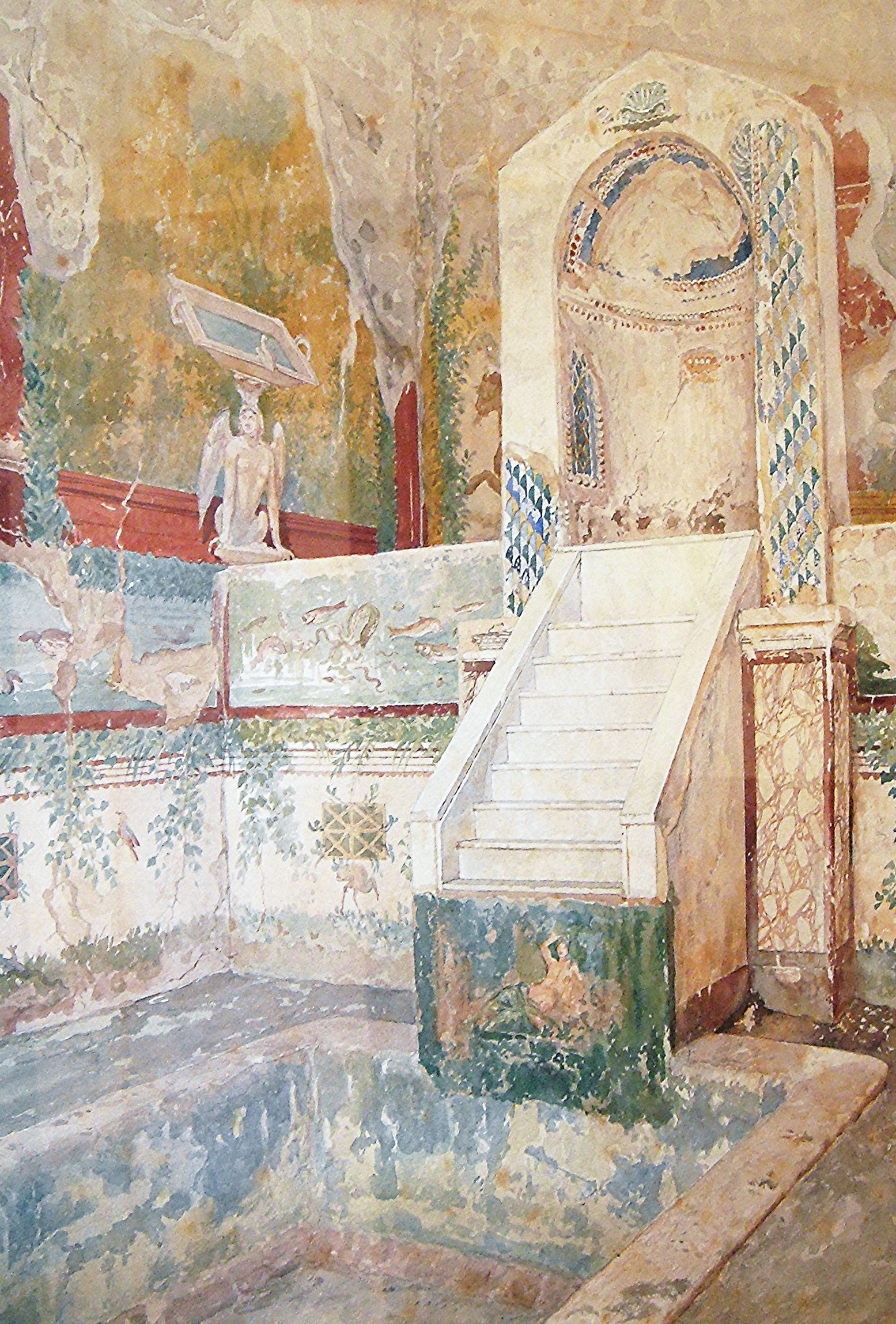
Atrium of the House of the Centenary, Pompeii, mid-2nd century BC (dry)

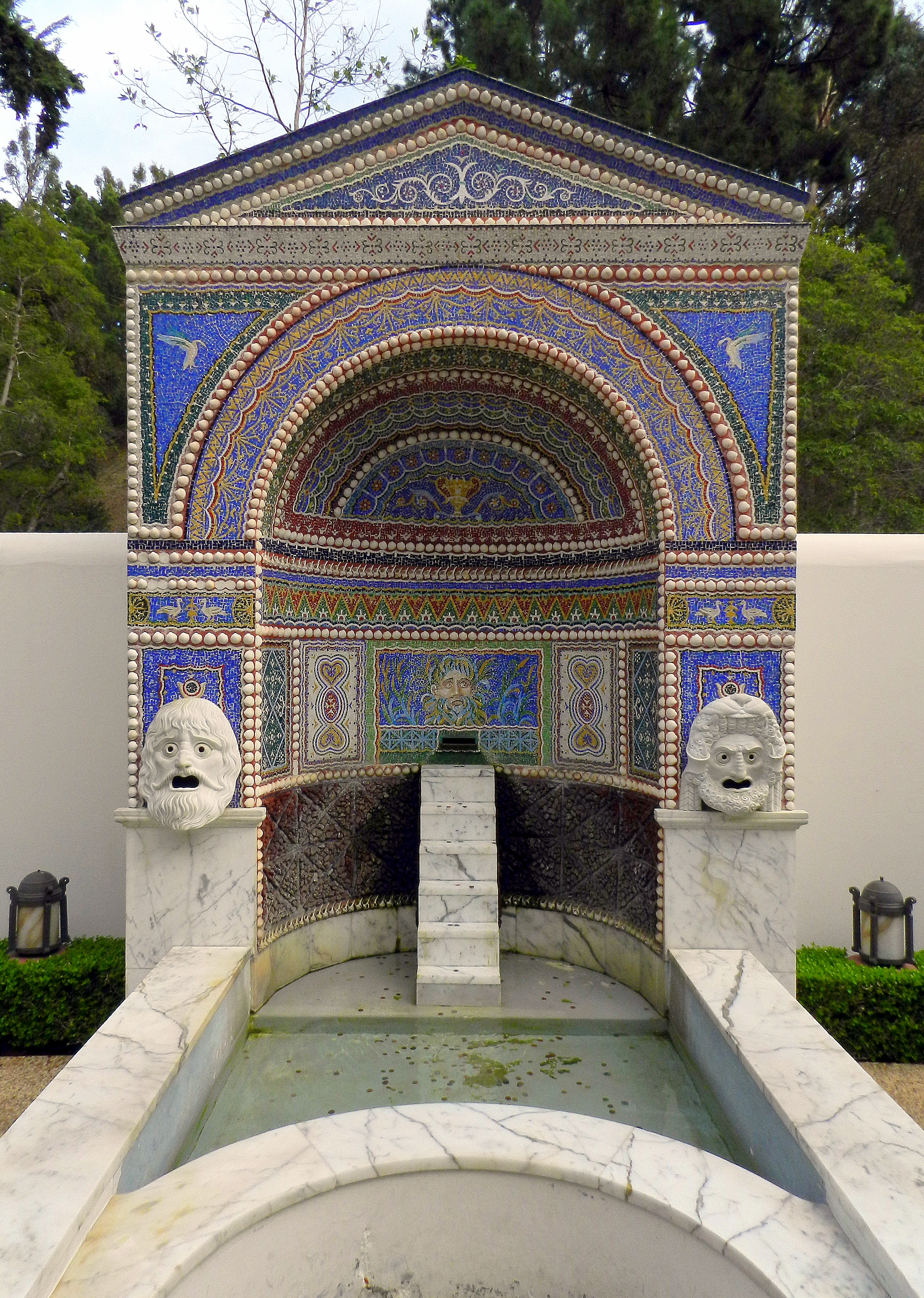
Replica of a Roman fountain in the House of the Large Fountain, Pompeii.

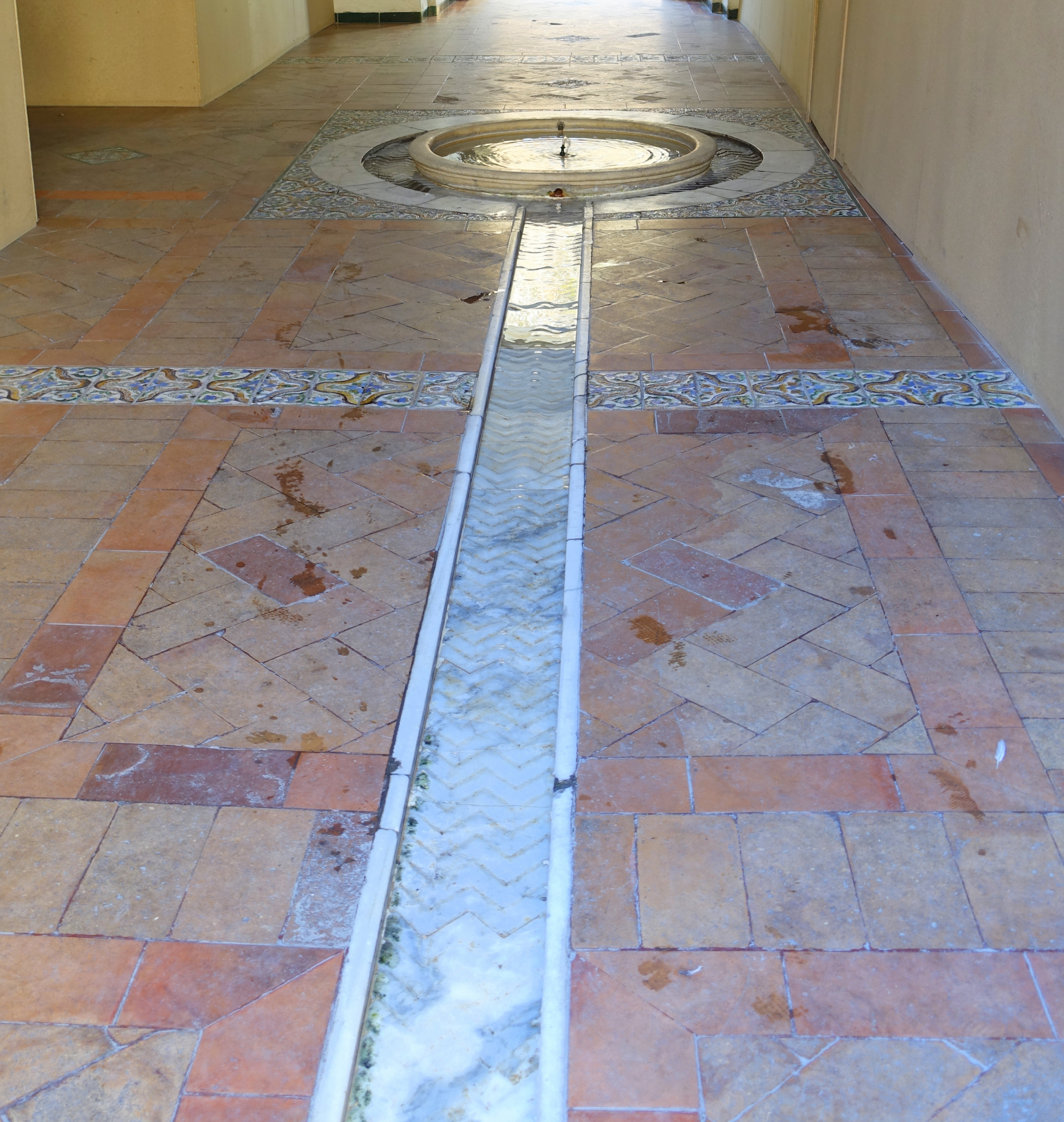
A near-horizontal ridged channel in the Room of Justice, 1360s Alcazar of Seville, Spain (wet)

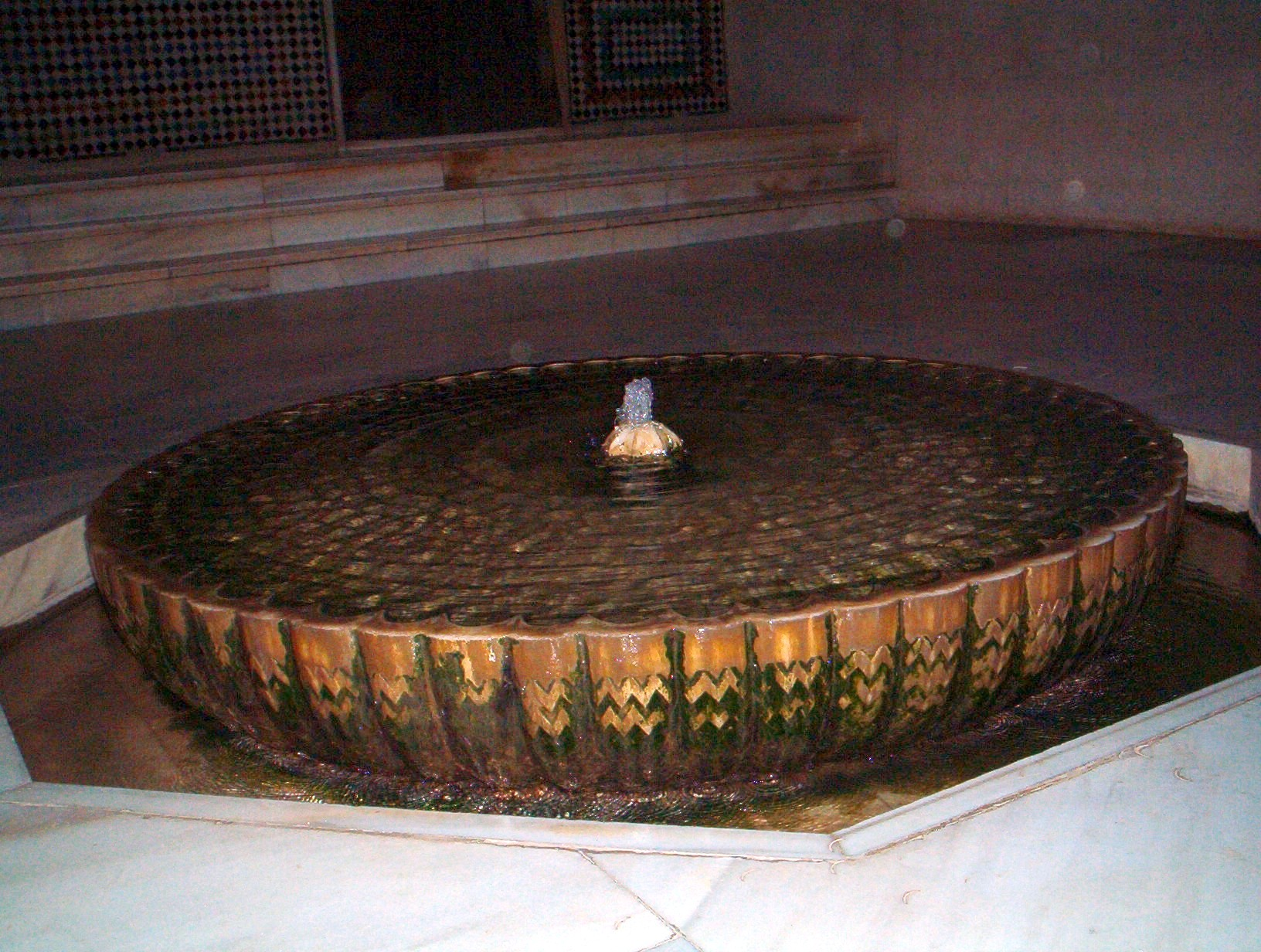
Water flows out over the corrugated sides of a fountain, 1360s Patio del Cuarto Dorado, Alhambra, Granada, Spain (wet)

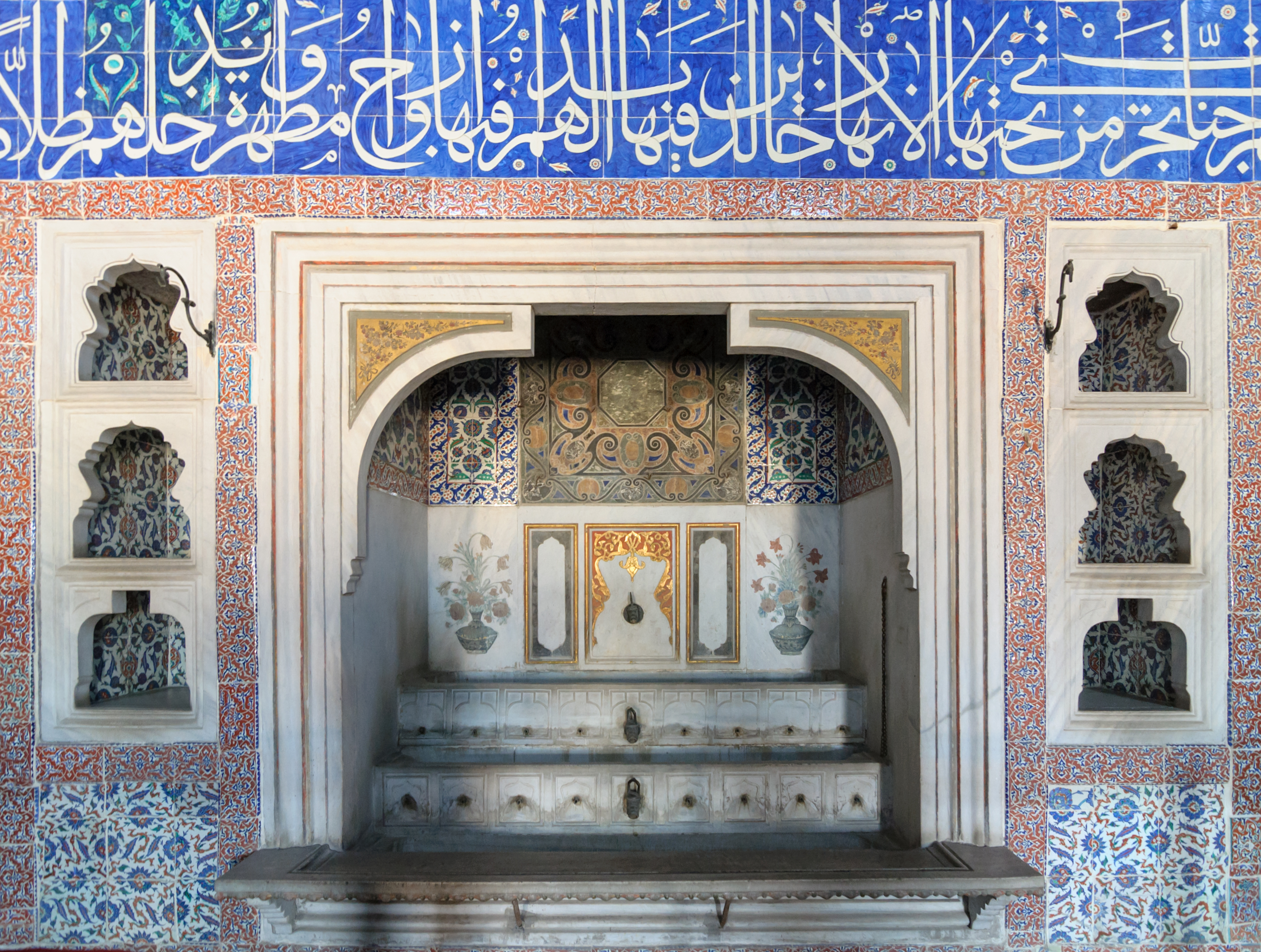
Privy Chamber of Murat III, late 16th century, Topkapı Palace, Istanbul, Turkey (dry)

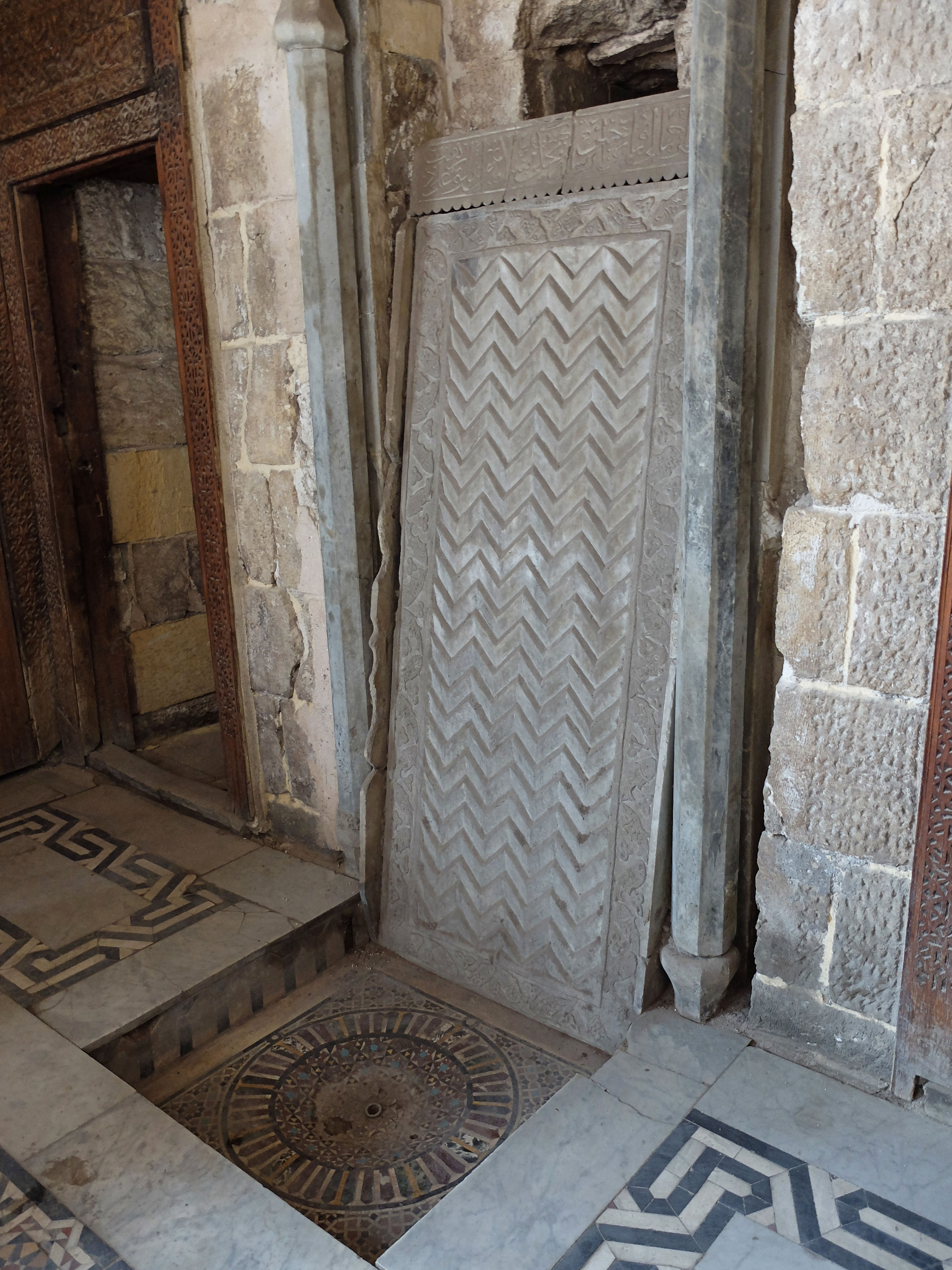
Marble salsabil in the sebil chamber of the al-Ghuriya Complex, Cairo, Egypt (dry)

== See also ==
- Passive cooling
