= Shadirvan =

Fountain used for ablutions in a mosque

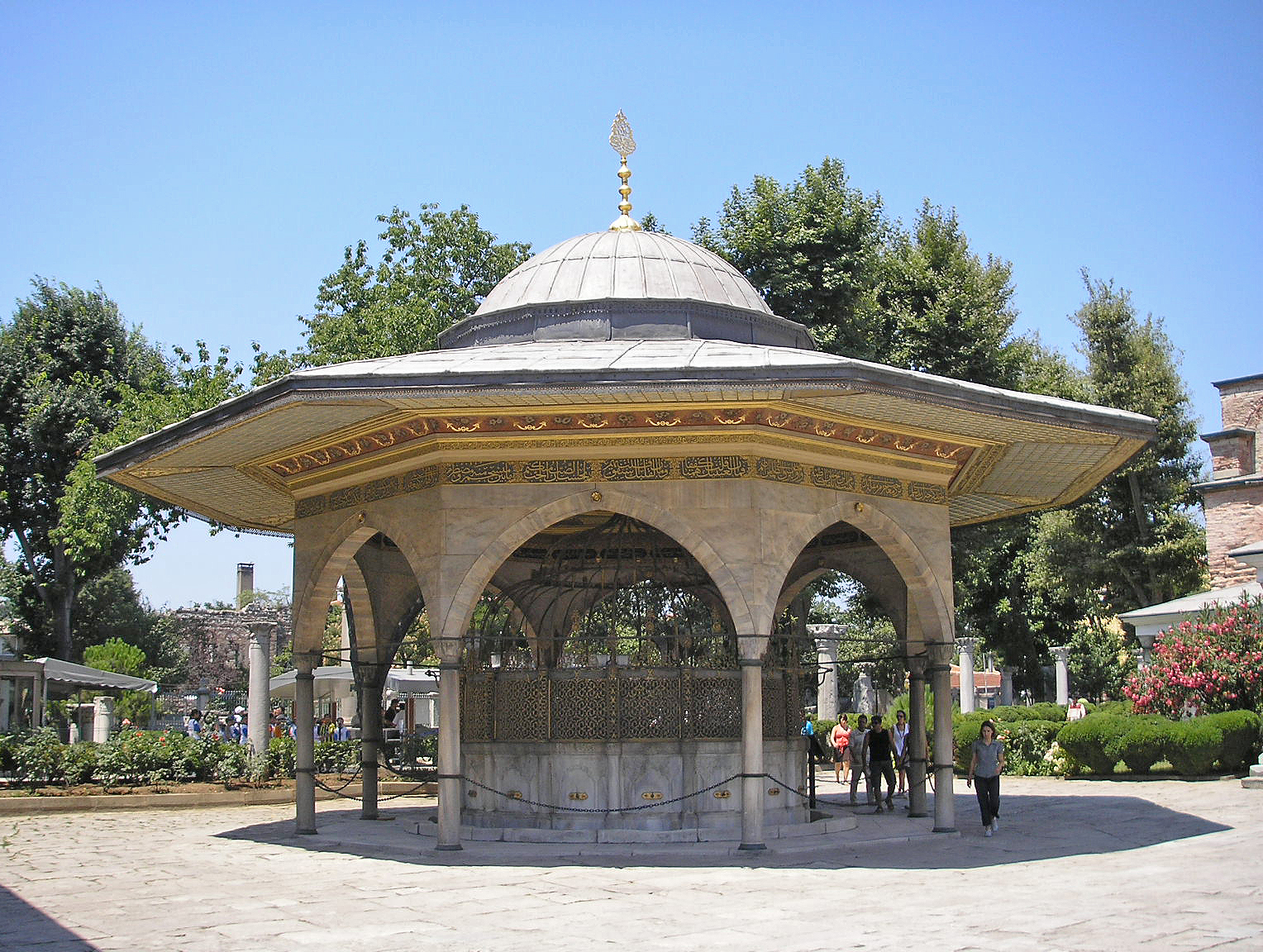
A şadırvan for ritual ablutions in front of Hagia Sophia, Istanbul, Turkey

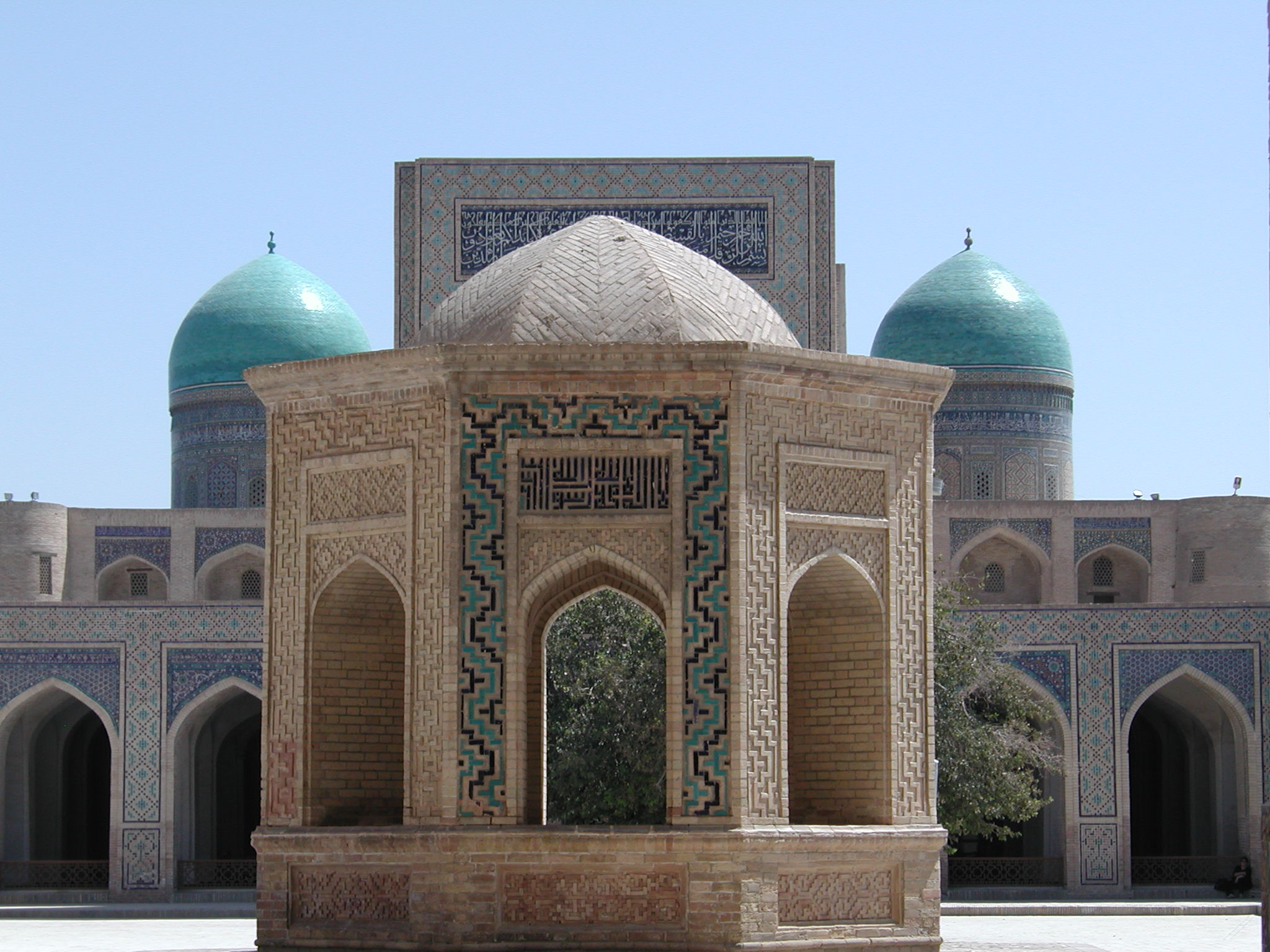
Shadırvan in Po-i-Kalyan, Bukhara, Uzbekistan

A shadirvan (Persian: شادروان, Turkish: şadırvan, Arabic: شاذروان) is a type of fountain that is usually built in the courtyard or near the entrance of mosques, caravanserais, khanqahs, and madrasas, with the main purpose of providing water for drinking or ritual ablutions to several people at the same time, but also as decorative visual or sound elements.

Shadirvans are Persian in origin and, with a curtain or drape, were originally placed in the tents of rulers or on the balconies of palaces. They are a typical element of Ottoman architecture.

== See also ==
- Cantharus, a similar fountain in Christian places of worship
- Howz
- Sebil or sabil, public water fountain in Islamic countries
