= Evaporative cooling chambers =

Non-electric cooling technology

Evaporative cooling chambers (ECCs), also known as "zero energy cool chambers" (ZECCs), are a type of evaporative cooler, which are simple and inexpensive ways to keep vegetables fresh without the use of electricity. Evaporation of water from a surface removes heat, creating a cooling effect, which can improve vegetable storage shelf life.

ECCs are relatively large compared to the more common household clay pot cooler, and are therefore most suitable for farmers with large production quantities, farming groups, or farming cooperatives.

== History ==
The brick ECC was originally developed in India by Susanta K. Roy and D.S. Khuridiya in the early 1980s to address fruit and vegetable post-harvest losses, especially in rural areas where electricity is non-existent. Roy and Khuridiya’s ECC design is composed of a double brick wall structure, supported by a base layer of brick, and covered with a straw mat.

== Suitability ==
ECCs provide the most benefits when they are used in low humidity climates (less than 40% relative humidity), the temperature is hot (maximum daily temperature greater than 25 °C), water is available to add to the device between one and three times per day. The device should be in a shady and well-ventilated area.

Additionally, storage conditions must meet users’ needs for scale of storage needed and optimal conditions for different vegetables throughout the year. The cost of the ECC must be affordable and justified by the benefits be realized due to its improved storage.

== Construction ==
The size of an ECC can be chosen to meet a range of user storage needs; however, the cost can vary significantly based on the desired size and local cost of materials. Because ECCs can be constructed over a range of sizes, it is important to select an appropriate size according to the need to avoid over-building and spending more money than is needed.

Evaporative cooling chambers (ECCs) can be made from locally available materials, including bricks, sand, wood, dry grass, gunny/burlap sacks, and twine. The space in between the two brick walls is filled with sand, which retains the water that is added. If the evaporative cooling chamber is not built in an area that is well shaded, a shed must be constructed to provide shade. Inside the ECC, food is placed in unsealed plastic containers, which keep the vegetables off the ECC’s floor and allows them to breathe and be exposed to the cool, humid air inside the device.

== Best practices for use ==
It is important that ECCs are correctly used to ensure maximum cooling performance benefit for the user. Improper use decreases the potential benefits and results in a lower cost-benefit ratio. The vegetables that need storage should be carefully considered, since not all produce can be stored together because some release ethylene, which can accelerate ripening or reduce post-harvest quality.

Before starting to build an ECC, a location should be chosen that is close to water, exposed to wind/breeze, and if possible, where there is shade to avoid the need of a cover. ECCs should be reinstalled every 3 years with new bricks. The cover of the ECC should be opened as infrequently as possible to keep the cool air in. The sand between the bricks must be kept wet; installing an irrigation system can make this process simpler. Additionally, water should be sprinkled on the cover 1-3 times per day.

== Sources ==
This article incorporates text from a free content work. Licensed under CC BY-SA 3.0. Text taken from Evaporative cooling chamber. Energypedia.
