= Búcaro de Indias =

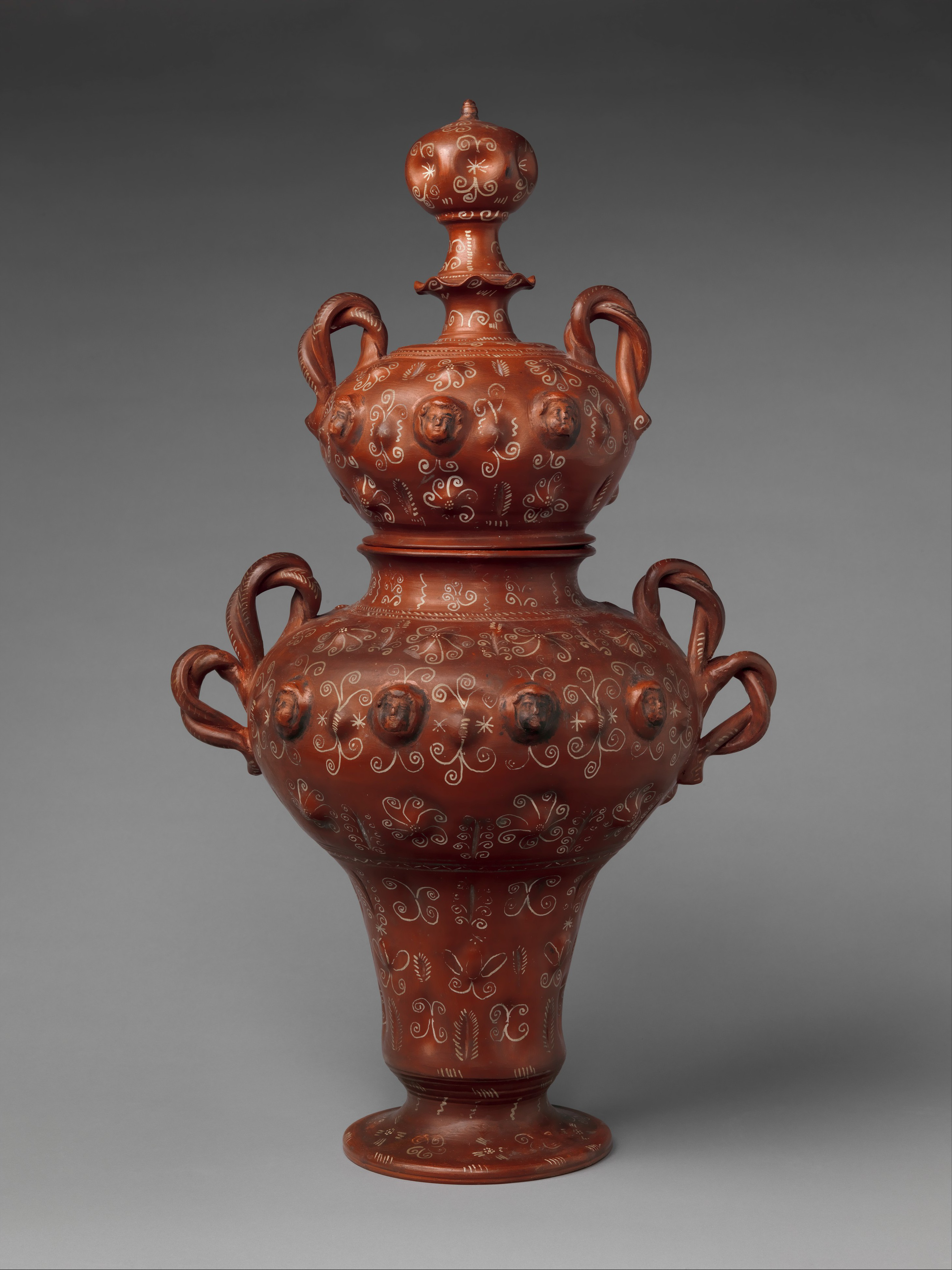
- Year: 17th century
- Location: Metropolitan Museum of Art
- Accession No.: 2015.45.2a, b
- Identifiers: The Met object ID: 662163

In Spanish a búcaro is a general term for water jars, and a búcaro de Indias ("búcaro from the Indies") is a particular type exported to Europe, made in Tonalá, Jalisco, Mexico from the 17th century onwards.

They were made of a special type of clay which gave water held in them a "pleasing aroma and taste", which was thought to be beneficial to health. Fragments of the búcaros were even eaten, especially by women in Spain and Italy, as they were thought to lighten the complexion. A small one is offered to the little princess by the lady in waiting in Diego Velázquez’s Las Meninas, a group portrait of the Spanish royal family, and they appear in paintings by Tomás Hiepes and Juan van der Hamen. Spanish Golden Age authors like Lope de Vega satirized the eating of the pottery.

"Niña de color quebrado / O tienes amores o comes barro." ("Girl of broken color, either you have lovers, or you eat clay.")

— Lope de Vega, El Acero de Madrid (1608)

The large example shown is 27 3/4 in. (70.5 cm) tall, and made of unglazed earthenware that has been burnished and given decorative touches in white paint. Once filled, the porous earthenware acts as an evaporative cooler, cooling the water.
