= Icebox =

Non-mechanical household appliance for cooling foodstuffs

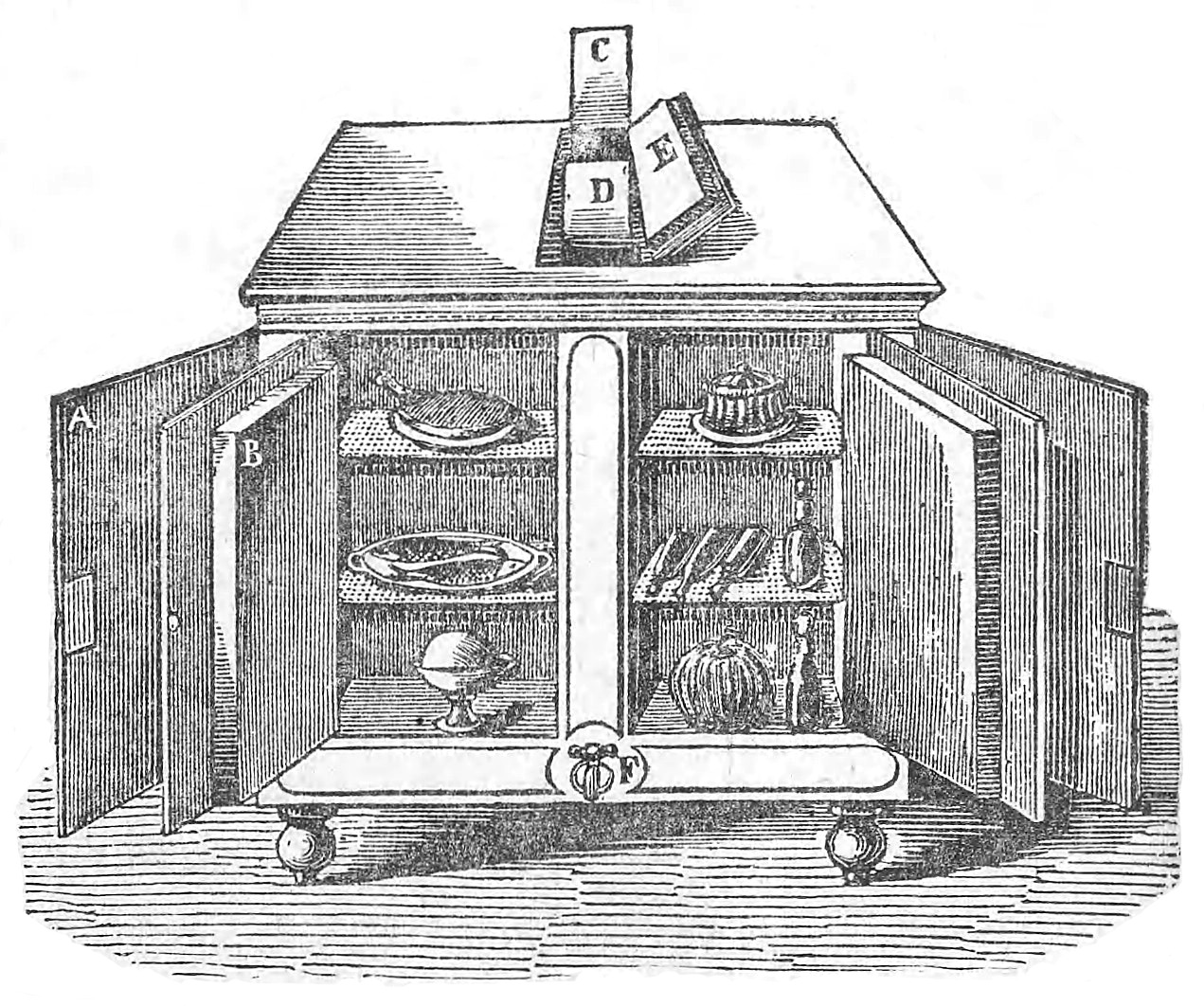
Icebox used in cafés of Paris in the late 1800s

An icebox (also called a cold closet) is a compact, non-mechanical refrigerator which was a common early-twentieth-century kitchen appliance before the development of safely powered refrigeration devices. They were insulated cabinets, to which large chunks of ice would need to be added every several days to maintain refrigeration.

Before the development of electric refrigerators, iceboxes were referred to by the public as "refrigerators". Only after the invention of the modern electric refrigerator did early non-electric refrigerators become known as iceboxes. The terms ice box and refrigerator were used interchangeably in advertising as long ago as 1848.

== Origin ==
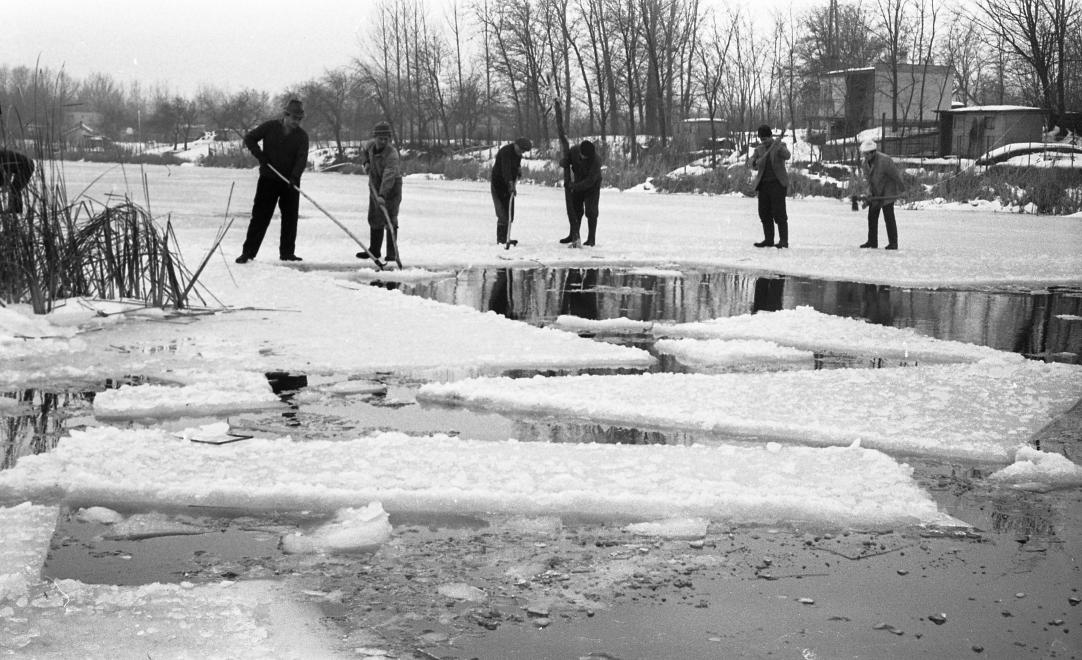
Ice extraction taking place in 1970

The first recorded use of refrigeration technology dates back to 1775 BC in the Sumerian city of Terqa. It was there that the region's King, Zimri-lim, began the construction of an elaborate ice house fitted with a sophisticated drainage system and shallow pools to freeze water in the night. Using ice for cooling and preservation was not new at that time; the ice house was an introductory model for the modern icebox. The traditional kitchen icebox dates back to the days of ice harvesting, which was commonly used from the mid-19th century until the introduction of the refrigerator for home use in the 1930s. Most municipally consumed ice was harvested in winter from snow-packed areas or frozen lakes, stored in ice houses, and delivered domestically. In 1827 the commercial ice cutter was invented, increasing the ease and efficiency of harvesting natural ice. This invention reduced the cost of ice usage, thereby rendering it more common.

Up until then, iceboxes for domestic use were not mass manufactured. By the 1840s, however, various companies, including the Baldwin Refrigerator Company and the Ranney Refrigerator Company, and later Sears, started making home iceboxes commercially. D. Eddy & Son of Boston is considered to be the first company to produce iceboxes in mass numbers. As many Americans desired large iceboxes, some companies, such as the Boston Scientific Refrigerator Company, introduced ones which could hold up to 50 lb (23 kg) of ice. In a 1907 survey of expenditures of New York City inhabitants, 81% of the families surveyed were found to possess "refrigerators" either in the form of ice stored in a tub or iceboxes. The industry's value in the United States rose from $4.5 million in 1889 to $26 million in 1919.

== Design ==
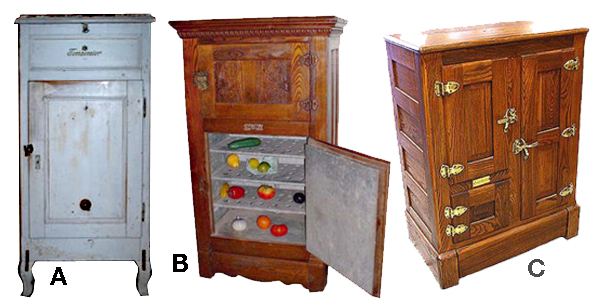
A. Norwegian icebox. The ice was placed in the drawer at top. B. Typical Victorian icebox, of oak with tin or zinc shelving and door lining. C. An oak cabinet icebox that would be found in well-to-do homes.

The icebox was invented by an American farmer and cabinetmaker named Thomas Moore in 1802. Moore used the icebox to transport butter from his home to the Georgetown markets, which allowed him to sell firm, brick butter instead of soft, melted tubs like his fellow vendors at the time. His first design consisted of an oval cedar tub with a tin container fitted inside with ice between them, all wrapped in rabbit fur to insulate the device. Later versions would include hollow walls that were lined with tin or zinc and packed with various insulating materials such as cork, sawdust, straw, or seaweed. A large block of ice is held in a tray or compartment near the top of the box. Cold air circulates down and around storage compartments in the lower section. Some finer models have spigots for draining ice water from a catch pan or holding tank. In cheaper models, a drip pan is placed under the box and has to be emptied at least daily. The user has to replenish the melted ice, normally by obtaining new ice from an iceman. The design of the icebox allowed perishable foods to be stored longer than before and without the need for lengthier preservation processes such as smoking, drying, or canning. Refrigerating perishables also had the added benefit of not altering the taste of what it is preserving.

== Ice collection and distribution ==
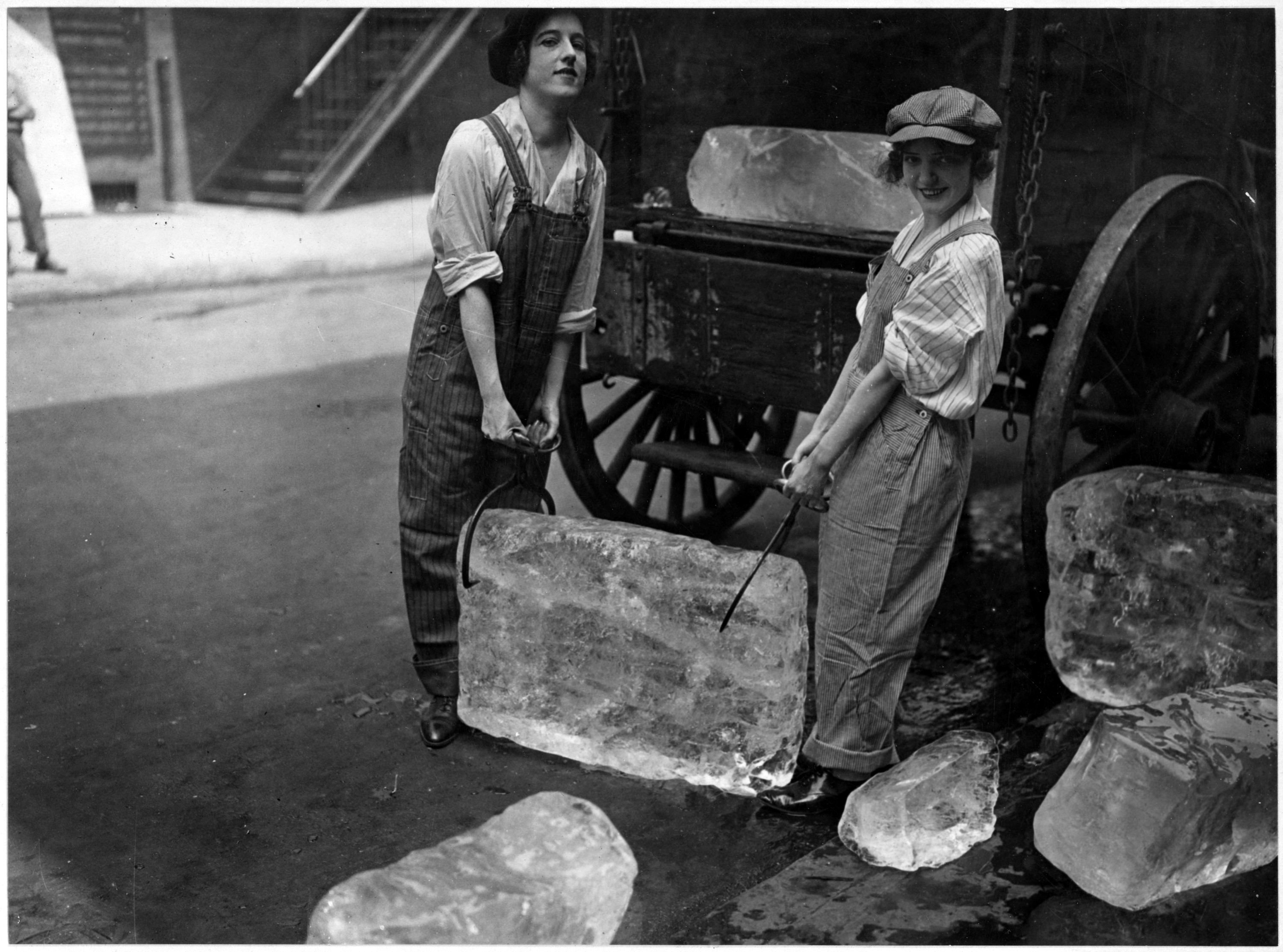
Women delivering ice. During WWI, many women were employed as icemen (or "ice girls", as they were called).

Underground pits with the constant underground temperature of 12 °C (54 °F) had been used since Roman times to help preserve ice collected during winter. The temperature of the soil is held relatively constant year-round when taken below the frost line, located 0.9 to 1.5 m (3 to 5 ft) below the surface, and varies between 7 and 21 °C (45 and 70 °F) depending on the region. Prior to the convenience of having refrigeration inside the home, cold storage systems would often be located underground in the form of a pit. These pits would be deep enough to provide insulation and also deter animals from the food within. Early examples used straw and sawdust compacted along the sides of ice for further insulation and slower melting.

By 1781, personal ice pits were becoming more advanced. The Robert Morris Ice House, located in Philadelphia, brought new refrigeration technologies to the forefront. This pit contained a drainage system for water runoff as well as the use of brick and mortar for its insulation. The octagonal pit, approximately 4 m (13 ft) in diameter and 5.5 m (18 ft) underground was able to store ice that obtained in winter until the next October or November. Ice blocks collected during winter could later be distributed to customers. As residential iceboxes appeared in the early to mid 19th century, ice collection and distribution expanded and soon became a global industry. During the latter half of the 19th century, natural ice became the second most important US export by value after cotton.

== Impact and legacy ==
As the techniques for food preservation steadily improved, prices decreased and food became more readily available. As more households adopted the icebox, the overall quality and freshness of this food was also improved. Iceboxes meant that people were able to go to the market less and could more safely store leftovers. All of this contributed to the improvement of the population's health by increasing the fresh food readily able to be consumed and the overall safety of that food. However, with metropolitan growth, many sources of natural ice became contaminated from industrial pollution or sewer runoff.

Thanks to the icebox manufacturing industry's efforts, a new innovative idea in cooling came about: air circulation. The idea for air circulation in refrigeration systems stems back to John Schooley, who wrote about his process in the 1856 Scientific American, a popular science magazine. Schooley described the process as "Combining an ice receptacle with the interior of a refrigerator … a continuous circulation of air shall be kept up through the ice in said receptacle and through the interior of the refrigerator … so that the circulation air shall deposit its moisture on the ice every time it passes through it, and be dried and cooled." This idea of air circulation and cold led to the eventual invention of the mechanical, gas-driven refrigerators. As these early mechanical refrigerators became available, they were installed at large industrial plants producing ice for home delivery.

By the early 1930s, mechanical ice machines gradually began to rise over the ice harvesting industry thanks to its ability to produce clean, sanitary ice independently and year-round. Over time, as the mechanical ice machines became smaller, cheaper, and more efficient, they easily replaced the hassle of getting ice from a source. For example, the De La Vergne Machine Company (originally called the De La Vergne Refrigerating Machine Company) of New York could produce up to 220 tons of ice in a single day, from a single machine. With widespread electrification and safer refrigerants, mechanical refrigeration in the home became possible. With the development of chlorofluorocarbons (along with the succeeding hydrochlorofluorocarbons and hydrofluorocarbons), that came to replace the use of toxic ammonia gas, the refrigerator replaced the icebox, though icebox is still occasionally used today to refer to mechanical refrigerators.

== See also ==
- Travel cooler
- Coolgardie safe
- Meat safe
- Pot-in-pot refrigerator
- California cooler (cabinet)
- Icebox cookie
