= Coolgardie safe =

Refrigeration device

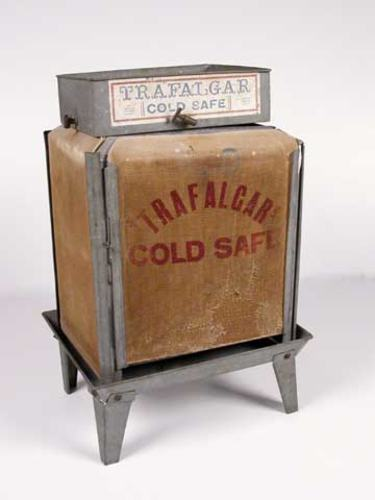
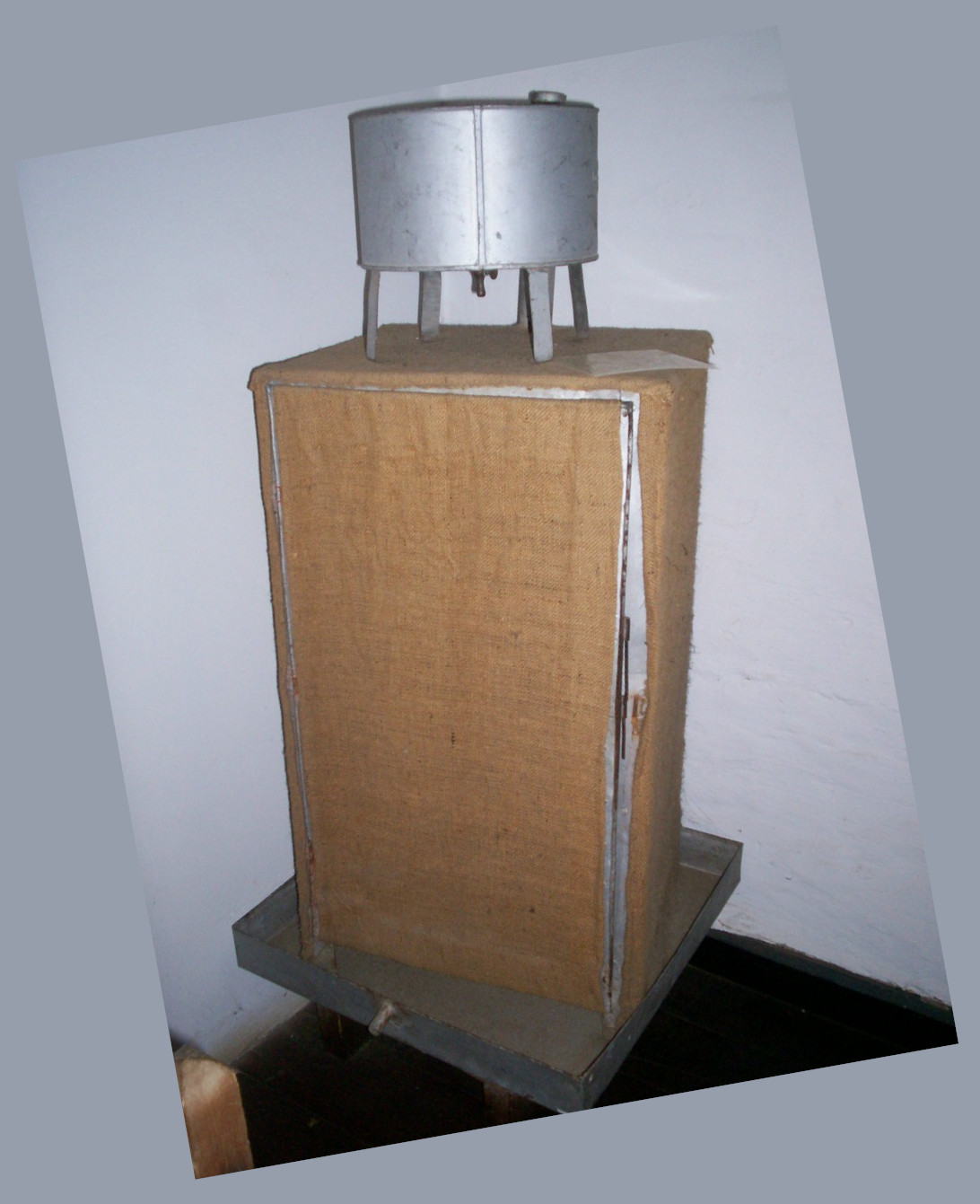
Coolgardie safes at Kalgoorlie's Mining Museum, part of the Western Australian Museum

The Coolgardie safe is a low-tech food storage unit, using evaporative cooling to prolong the life of whatever edibles are kept in it. It applies the basic principle of heat transfer which occurs during evaporation of water (see latent heat and heat of evaporation). It was named after the place where it was invented – the small mining town of Coolgardie, Western Australia, near Kalgoorlie-Boulder.

== History ==
Coolgardie was the site of a gold rush in the early 1890s, before the Kalgoorlie-Boulder gold rush.

For the prospectors who had rushed here to find their fortune, one challenge was to extend the life of their perishable foods – hence the invention of the Coolgardie safe.

The safe was invented in the late 1890s by Arthur Patrick McCormick, who used the same principle as explorers and travellers in the Outback used to cool their canvas water bags: when the canvas bag is wet the fibres expand and it holds water. Some water seeps out and evaporates. It is most effective when air continually moves past it, such as when in a moving vehicle or when exposed to a breeze.

This technology is commonly thought to have been adopted by explorer and scientist Thomas Mitchell, who had observed the way some Indigenous Australians used kangaroo skins to carry water.

== Principles of operation ==
The Coolgardie safe was made of wire mesh, hessian, a wooden frame and had a hot dip galvanised iron tray on top. The galvanised iron tray was filled with water. The hessian bag was hung over the side with one of the ends in the tray to soak up the water.

Gradually the hessian bag, acting as a wick, would draw water from the tray by the process of capillary action. When a breeze came it would pass through the wet bag and evaporate the water. This would cool the air inside the safe, and in turn cool the food stored in the safe. This cooling is due to the water in the hessian needing energy to change state and evaporate. This energy is taken from the interior of the safe (metal mesh), thus making the interior cooler. There is a metal tray below the safe to catch excess water from the hessian.

Some modern tests have shown that the interior of the safe would achieve temperatures 3–9 °C (dependant on breeze) cooler than the atmospheric temperature during the middle of the day.

It was usually placed on a veranda where there was a breeze. The Coolgardie safe was a common household item in Australia until the mid-twentieth century. Safes could be purchased ready-made or easily constructed at home. Some of the metal panel safes are highly decorated.

== See also ==
- Icebox
- Pot-in-pot refrigerator
- Solar-powered refrigerator
