= Mohammed Bah Abba =

Nigerian inventor of a food-cooling device

- Born: Nigeria
- Died: 2010; Nigeria
- Citizenship: Nigeria
- Known for: Pot-in-pot refrigerator

Mohammed Bah Abba (1964–2010) was a teacher from northern Nigeria who developed the pot-in-pot refrigerator in the 1990s. This refrigerator is extremely simple and does not require power, making it suitable for use in desert environments without easy access to electricity or repairs. It consists of a small glazed earthenware pot placed inside a larger unglazed one, with the space between the two filled with moist sand. The inner pot is filled with whatever is desired to be cooled (fruit, vegetables, drinks) and covered with a wet cloth. The evaporating water draws heat from the inside through the porous outer pot, cooling the interior by up to 14°C.

Abba hailed from a family of potmakers and tapped into the large underemployed local workforce for the project. Local pot-makers he hired produced the first batch of 5,000 pot-in-pot refrigerators. He received the Rolex Award for Enterprise in 2001 and used his $75,000 award to make the invention available throughout Nigeria. Abba devised an educational campaign tailored to village life and the illiterate population featuring a video-recorded play by local actors to dramatise the benefits of the desert refrigerator. The pots sell at 40 US cents a pair.
