= Evaporative cooler =

Device that cools air through the evaporation of water

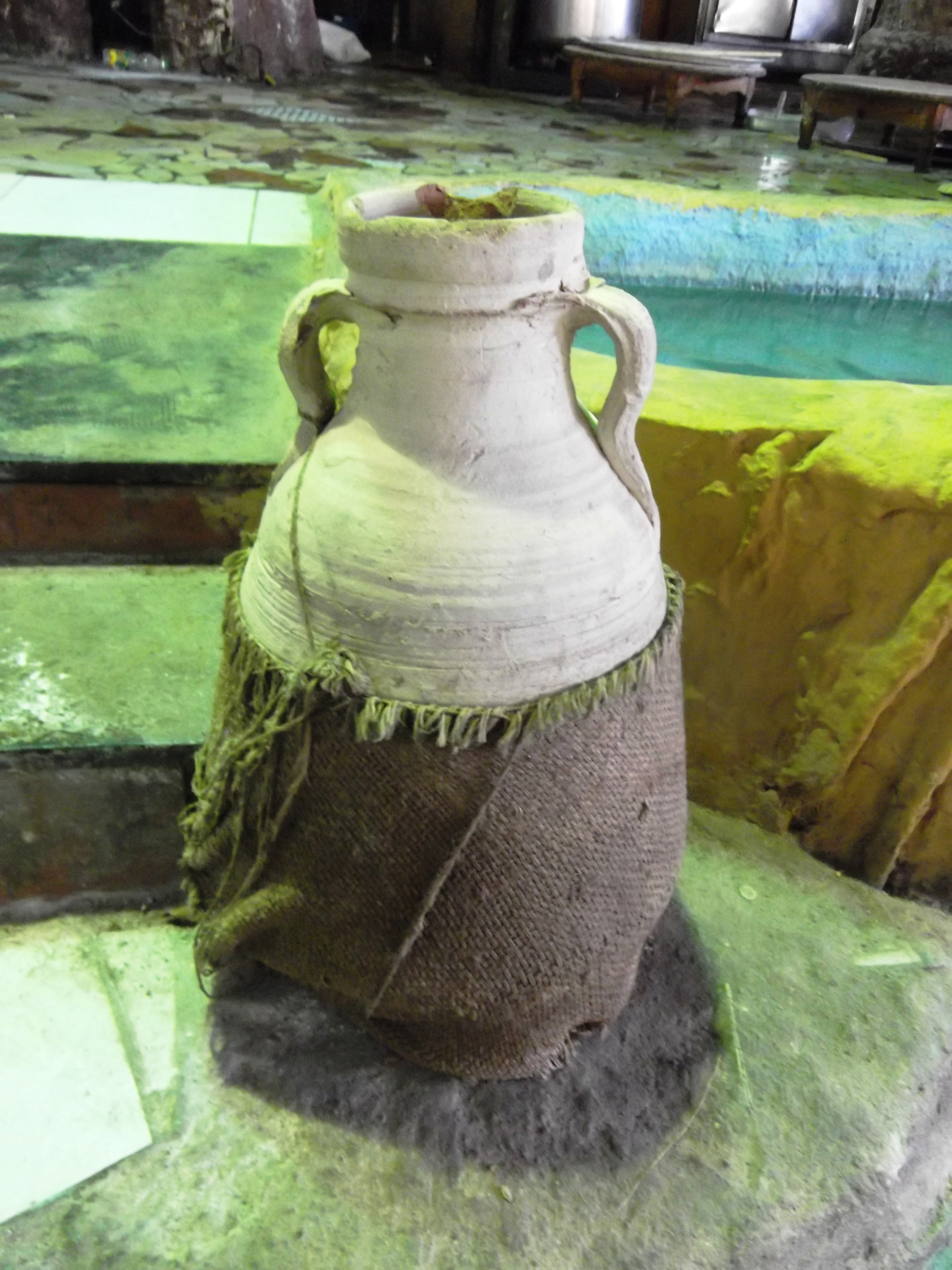
An Egyptian qullah, set in drafts to cool interiors. Porous pottery and coarse cloth maximize the area for evaporation.

An evaporative cooler (also known as evaporative air conditioner, swamp cooler, swamp box, desert cooler and wet air cooler) is a device that cools air through the evaporation of water. Evaporative cooling differs from other air conditioning systems, which use vapor-compression or absorption refrigeration cycles. Evaporative cooling exploits the fact that water will absorb a relatively large amount of heat in order to evaporate (that is, it has a large enthalpy of vaporization). The temperature of dry air can be dropped significantly through the phase transition of liquid water to water vapor (evaporation). This natural process can often cool air using much less energy than other forms of refrigeration. In extremely dry climates, evaporative cooling of air has the added benefit of raising the humidity and conditioning the air with more moisture for the comfort of building occupants.

The cooling potential for evaporative cooling is dependent on the wet-bulb depression, the difference between dry-bulb temperature and wet-bulb temperature (see relative humidity). In arid climates, evaporative cooling can reduce energy consumption and total equipment for conditioning as an alternative to compressor-based cooling. In climates not considered arid, indirect evaporative cooling can still take advantage of the evaporative cooling process without increasing humidity. Passive evaporative cooling strategies can offer the same benefits as mechanical evaporative cooling systems without the complexity of equipment and ductwork.

== History ==
An earlier form of evaporative cooling, the windcatcher, was first used in ancient Egypt and Persia thousands of years ago in the form of wind shafts on the roof. They caught the wind, passed it over subterranean water in a qanat and discharged the cooled air into the building. Modern Iranians have widely adopted powered evaporative coolers (coolere âbi).

The evaporative cooler was the subject of numerous US patents in the 20th century; many of these, starting in 1906, suggested or assumed the use of excelsior (wood wool) pads as the elements to bring a large volume of water in contact with moving air to allow evaporation to occur. A typical design, as shown in a 1945 patent, includes a water reservoir (usually with level controlled by a float valve), a pump to circulate water over the excelsior pads and a centrifugal fan to draw air through the pads and into the house. This design and this material remain dominant in evaporative coolers in the American Southwest, where they are also used to increase humidity. In the United States, the use of the term swamp cooler may be due to the odor of algae produced by early units.

On some pre-1960s automobiles, before factory installed air conditioning was available as an option, externally mounted aftermarket car swamp coolers were used to cool interior air.

Passive evaporative cooling techniques in buildings have been a feature of desert architecture for centuries, but Western acceptance, study, innovation, and commercial application are all relatively recent. In 1974, William H. Goettl noticed how evaporative cooling technology works in arid climates, speculated that a combination unit could be more effective, and invented the "High Efficiency Astro Air Piggyback System", a combination refrigeration and evaporative cooling air conditioner. In 1986, University of Arizona researchers built a passive evaporative cooling tower, and performance data from this experimental facility in Tucson, Arizona became the foundation of evaporative cooling tower design guidelines.

Schematic diagram of an ancient Iranian windcatcher and qanat, used for evaporative cooling of buildings

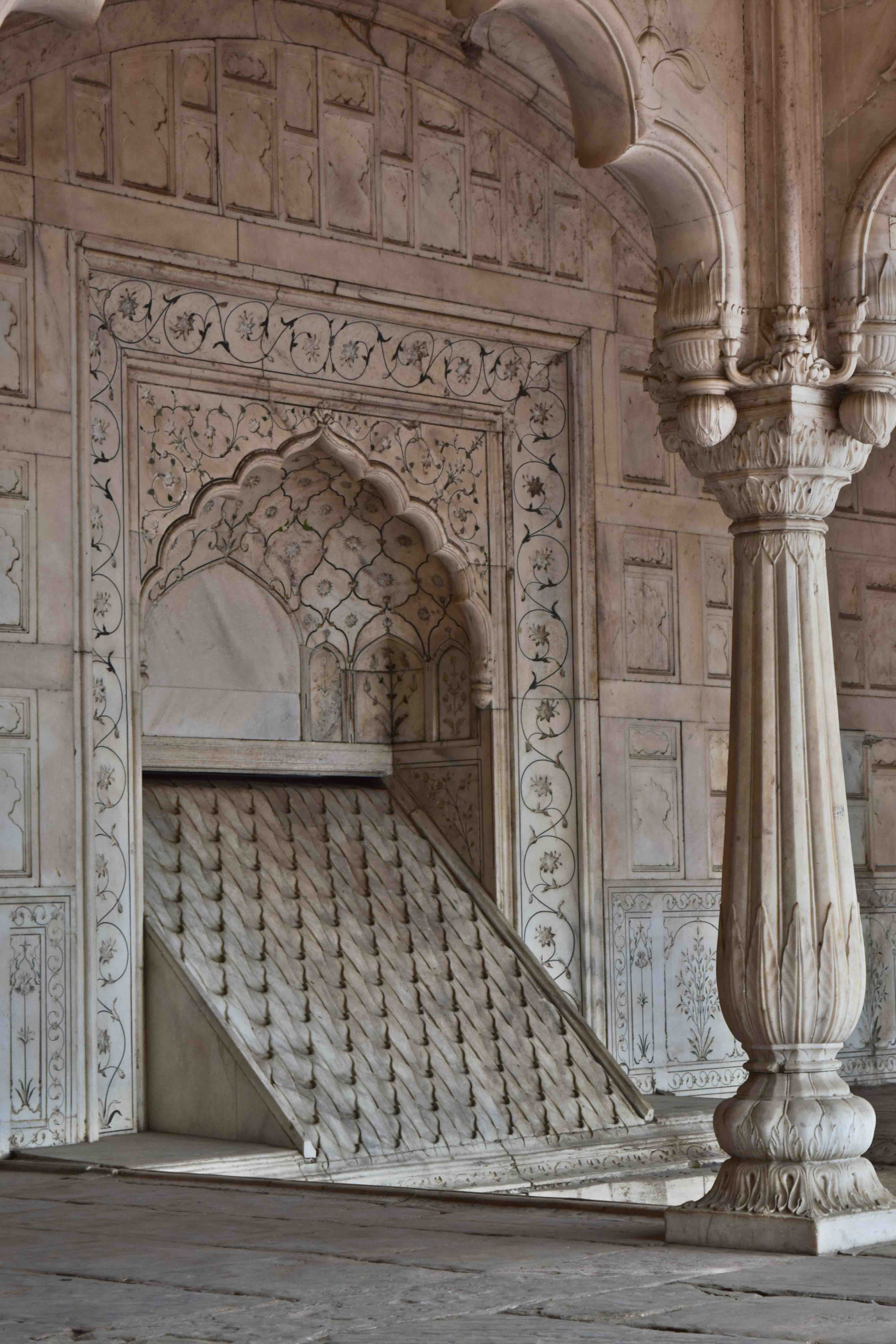
A salasabil cooling fountain (Red Fort, Delhi, India)

== Physical principles ==
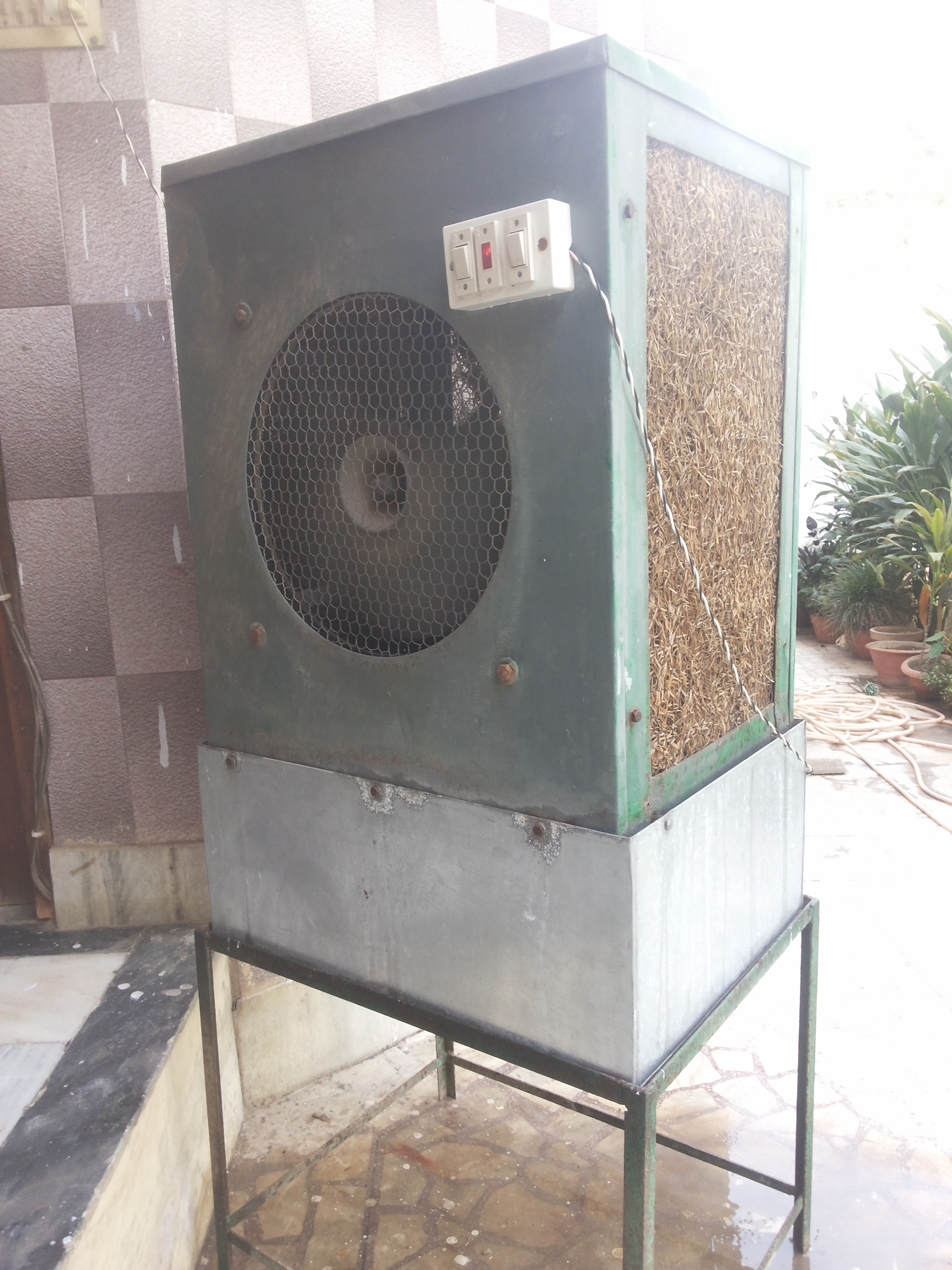
A traditional air cooler in Mirzapur, Uttar Pradesh, India

Evaporative coolers lower the temperature of air using the principle of evaporative cooling, unlike typical air conditioning systems which use vapor-compression refrigeration or absorption refrigeration. Evaporative cooling is the conversion of liquid water into vapor using the thermal energy in the air, resulting in a lower air temperature. The energy needed to evaporate the water is taken from the air in the form of sensible heat, which affects the temperature of the air, and converted into latent heat, the energy present in the water vapor component of the air, whilst the air remains at a constant enthalpy value. This conversion of sensible heat to latent heat is known as an isenthalpic process because it occurs at a constant enthalpy value. Evaporative cooling therefore causes a drop in the temperature of air proportional to the sensible heat drop and an increase in humidity proportional to the latent heat gain. Evaporative cooling can be visualized using a psychrometric chart by finding the initial air condition and moving along a line of constant enthalpy toward a state of higher humidity.

A simple example of natural evaporative cooling is perspiration, or sweat, secreted by the body, evaporation of which cools the body. The amount of heat transfer depends on the evaporation rate, however for each kilogram of water vaporized 2,257 kJ of energy (about 890 BTU per pound of pure water, at 95 °F (35 °C)) are transferred. The evaporation rate depends on the temperature and humidity of the air, which is why sweat accumulates more on humid days, as it does not evaporate fast enough.

Vapor-compression refrigeration uses evaporative cooling, but the evaporated vapor is within a sealed system, and is then compressed ready to evaporate again, using energy to do so. A simple evaporative cooler's water is evaporated into the environment, and not recovered. In an interior space cooling unit, the evaporated water is introduced into the space along with the now-cooled air; in an evaporative tower the evaporated water is carried off in the airflow exhaust.

=== Other types of phase-change cooling ===
A closely related process, sublimation cooling, differs from evaporative cooling in that a phase transition from solid to vapor, rather than liquid to vapor, occurs.

Sublimation cooling has been observed to operate on a planetary scale on the planetoid Pluto, where it has been called an anti-greenhouse effect.

Another application of a phase change to cooling is the "self-refrigerating" beverage can. A separate compartment inside the can contains a desiccant and a liquid. Just before drinking, a tab is pulled so that the desiccant comes into contact with the liquid and dissolves. As it does so, it absorbs an amount of heat energy called the latent heat of fusion. Evaporative cooling works with the phase change of liquid into vapor and the latent heat of vaporization, but the self-cooling can uses a change from solid to liquid, and the latent heat of fusion, to achieve the same result.

== Applications ==
Before the advent of modern refrigeration, evaporative cooling was used for millennia, for instance in qanats, windcatchers, and mashrabiyas. A porous earthenware vessel would cool water by evaporation through its walls; frescoes from about 2500 BCE show slaves fanning jars of water to cool rooms. Alternatively, a bowl filled with milk or butter could be placed in another bowl filled with water, all being covered with a wet cloth resting in the water, to keep the milk or butter as fresh as possible (see zeer, botijo and Coolgardie safe).

Ancient Persian passive design taking advantage of evaporative cooling

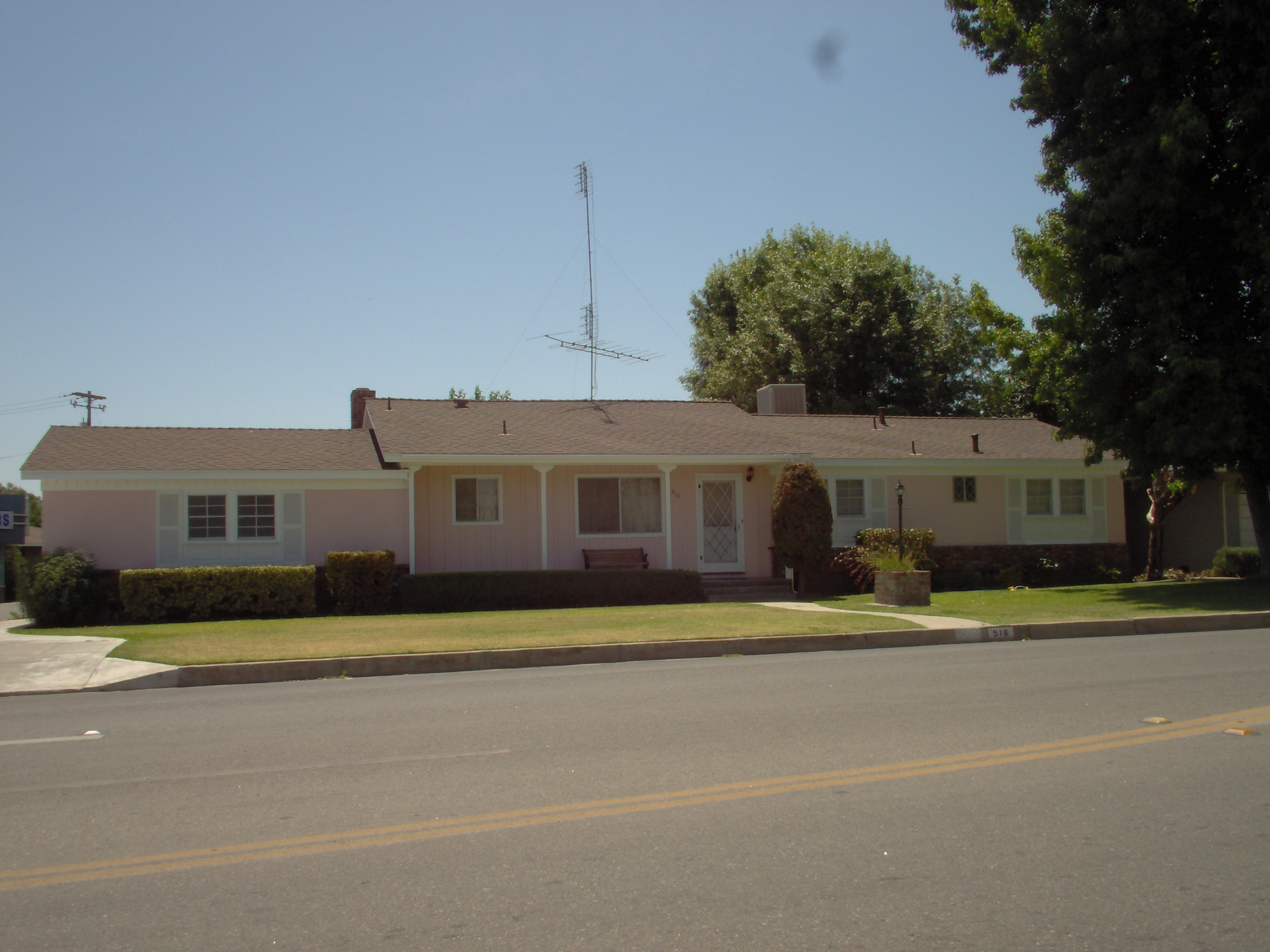
California ranch house with evaporative cooler box on roof ridgeline on right

Evaporative cooling is a common form of cooling buildings for thermal comfort since it is relatively cheap and requires less energy than other forms of cooling.

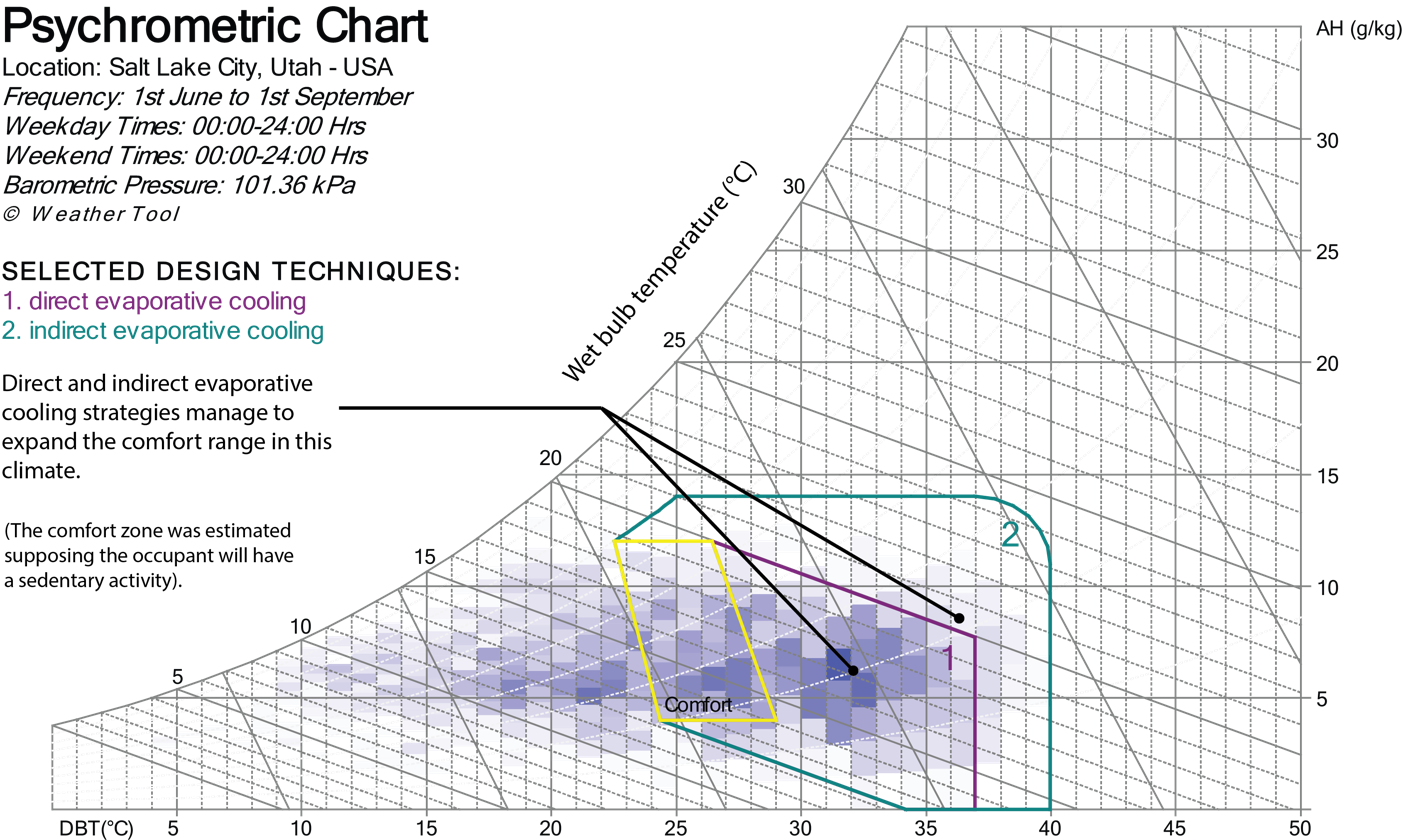
Psychrometric chart example of Salt Lake City

The figure showing the Salt Lake City weather data represents the typical summer climate (June to September). The colored lines illustrate the potential of direct and indirect evaporative cooling strategies to expand the comfort range in summer time. It is mainly explained by the combination of a higher air speed on one hand and elevated indoor humidity when the region permits the direct evaporative cooling strategy on the other hand. Evaporative cooling strategies that involve the humidification of the air should be implemented in dry condition where the increase in moisture content stays below recommendations for occupant's comfort and indoor air quality. Passive cooling towers lack the control that traditional HVAC systems offer to occupants. However, the additional air movement provided into the space can improve occupant comfort.

Evaporative cooling is most effective when the relative humidity is on the low side, limiting its popularity to dry climates. Evaporative cooling raises the internal humidity level significantly, which desert inhabitants may appreciate as the moist air re-hydrates dry skin and sinuses. Therefore, assessing typical climate data is an essential procedure to determine the potential of evaporative cooling strategies for a building. The three most important climate considerations are dry-bulb temperature, wet-bulb temperature, and wet-bulb depression during a typical summer day. It is important to determine if the wet-bulb depression can provide sufficient cooling during the summer day. By subtracting the wet-bulb depression from the outside dry-bulb temperature, one can estimate the approximate air temperature leaving the evaporative cooler. It is important to consider that the ability for the exterior dry-bulb temperature to reach the wet-bulb temperature depends on the saturation efficiency. A general recommendation for applying direct evaporative cooling is to implement it in places where the wet-bulb temperature of the outdoor air does not exceed 22 °C (72 °F). However, in the example of Salt Lake City, the upper limit for the direct evaporative cooling on psychrometric chart is 20 °C (68 °F). Despite the lower temperature, evaporative cooling is suitable for similar climates to Salt Lake City.

Evaporative cooling is especially well suited for climates where the air is hot and humidity is low. In the United States, the western and mountain states are good locations, with evaporative coolers prevalent in cities like Albuquerque, Denver, El Paso, Fresno, Salt Lake City, and Tucson. Evaporative air conditioning is also popular and well-suited to the southern (temperate) part of Australia. In dry, arid climates, the installation and operating cost of an evaporative cooler can be much lower than that of refrigerative air conditioning, often by 80% or so. However, evaporative cooling and vapor-compression air conditioning are sometimes used in combination to yield optimal cooling results. Some evaporative coolers may also serve as humidifiers in the heating season. In regions that are mostly arid, short periods of high humidity may prevent evaporative cooling from being an effective cooling strategy. An example of this event is the monsoon season in New Mexico and central and southern Arizona in July and August.

In locations with moderate humidity there are many cost-effective uses for evaporative cooling, in addition to their widespread use in dry climates. For example, industrial plants, commercial kitchens, laundries, dry cleaners, greenhouses, spot cooling (loading docks, warehouses, factories, construction sites, athletic events, workshops, garages, and kennels) and confinement farming (poultry ranches, hog, and dairy) often employ evaporative cooling. In highly humid climates, evaporative cooling may have little thermal comfort benefit beyond the increased ventilation and air movement it provides.

=== Other examples ===
Trees transpire large amounts of water through pores in their leaves called stomata, and through this process of evaporative cooling, forests interact with climate at local and global scales. Simple evaporative cooling devices such as evaporative cooling chambers (ECCs) and clay pot coolers, or pot-in-pot refrigerators, are simple and inexpensive ways to keep vegetables fresh without the use of electricity. Several hot and dry regions throughout the world could potentially benefit from evaporative cooling, including North Africa, the Sahel region of Africa, the Horn of Africa, southern Africa, the Middle East, arid regions of South Asia, and Australia. Benefits of evaporative cooling chambers for many rural communities in these regions include reduced post-harvest loss, less time spent traveling to the market, monetary savings, and increased availability of vegetables for consumption.

Evaporative cooling is commonly used in cryogenic applications. The vapor above a reservoir of cryogenic liquid is pumped away, and the liquid continuously evaporates as long as the liquid's vapor pressure is significant. Evaporative cooling of ordinary helium forms a 1-K pot, which can cool to at least 1.2 K. Evaporative cooling of helium-3 can provide temperatures below 300 mK. These techniques can be used to make cryocoolers, or as components of lower-temperature cryostats such as dilution refrigerators. As the temperature decreases, the vapor pressure of the liquid also falls, and cooling becomes less effective. This sets a lower limit to the temperature attainable with a given liquid.

Evaporative cooling is also the last cooling step in order to reach the ultra-low temperatures required for Bose–Einstein condensation (BEC). Here, so-called forced evaporative cooling is used to selectively remove high-energetic ("hot") atoms from an atom cloud until the remaining cloud is cooled below the BEC transition temperature. For a cloud of 1 million alkali atoms, this temperature is about 1μK.

Although robotic spacecraft use thermal radiation almost exclusively, many crewed spacecraft have short missions that permit open-cycle evaporative cooling. Examples include the Space Shuttle, the Apollo command and service module (CSM), lunar module and portable life support system. The Apollo CSM and the Space Shuttle also had radiators, and the Shuttle could evaporate ammonia as well as water. The Apollo spacecraft used sublimators, compact and largely passive devices that dump waste heat in water vapor (steam) that is vented to space. When liquid water is exposed to vacuum it boils vigorously, carrying away enough heat to freeze the remainder to ice that covers the sublimator and automatically regulates the feedwater flow depending on the heat load. The water expended is often available in surplus from the fuel cells used by many crewed spacecraft to produce electricity.

== Designs ==
Evaporative cooler illustration

Most designs take advantage of the fact that water has one of the highest known enthalpy of vaporization (latent heat of vaporization) values of any common substance. Because of this, evaporative coolers use only a fraction of the energy of vapor-compression or absorption air conditioning systems. Except in very dry climates, the single-stage (direct) cooler can increase relative humidity (RH) to a level that makes occupants uncomfortable. Indirect and two-stage evaporative coolers keep the RH lower.

=== Direct evaporative cooling ===
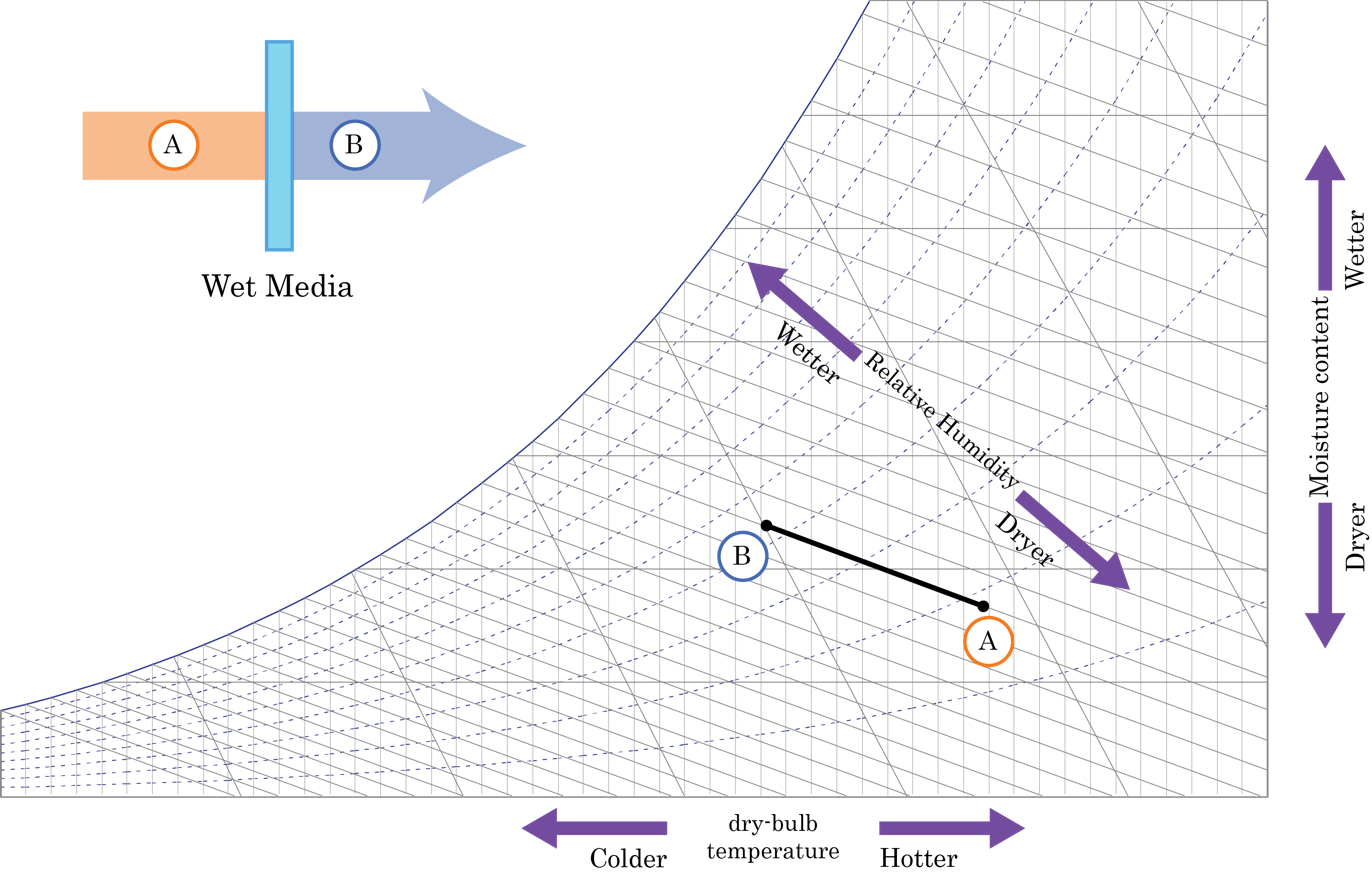
Direct evaporative cooling

Direct evaporative cooling (open circuit) is used to lower the temperature and increase the humidity of air by using latent heat of evaporation, changing liquid water to water vapor. In this process, the energy in the air does not change. Warm dry air is changed to cool moist air. The heat of the outside air is used to evaporate water. The RH increases to 70 to 90% which reduces the cooling effect of human perspiration. The moist air has to be continually released to outside or else the air becomes saturated and evaporation stops.

A mechanical direct evaporative cooler unit uses a fan to draw air through a wetted membrane, or pad, which provides a large surface area for the evaporation of water into the air. Water is sprayed at the top of the pad so it can drip down into the membrane and continually keep the membrane saturated. Any excess water that drips out from the bottom of the membrane is collected in a pan and recirculated to the top. Single-stage direct evaporative coolers are typically small in size as they only consist of the membrane, water pump, and centrifugal fan. The mineral content of the municipal water supply will cause scaling on the membrane, which will lead to clogging over the life of the membrane. Depending on this mineral content and the evaporation rate, regular cleaning and maintenance are required to ensure optimal performance. Generally, supply air from the single-stage evaporative cooler will need to be exhausted directly (one-through flow) as with direct evaporative cooling. A few design solutions have been conceived to utilize the energy in the air, like directing the exhaust air through two sheets of double glazed windows, thus reducing the solar energy absorbed through the glazing. Compared to energy required to achieve the equivalent cooling load with a compressor, single stage evaporative coolers consume less energy.

Passive direct evaporative cooling can occur anywhere that the evaporatively cooled water can cool a space without the assistance of a fan. This can be achieved through the use of fountains or more architectural designs such as the evaporative downdraft cooling tower, also called a "passive cooling tower". The passive cooling tower design allows outside air to flow in through the top of a tower that is constructed within or next to the building. The outside air comes in contact with water inside the tower either through a wetted membrane or a mister. As water evaporates in the outside air, the air becomes cooler and less buoyant and creates a downward flow in the tower. At the bottom of the tower, an outlet allows the cooler air into the interior. Similar to mechanical evaporative coolers, towers can be an attractive low-energy solution for hot and dry climate as they only require a water pump to raise water to the top of the tower. Energy savings from using a passive direct evaporating cooling strategy depends on the climate and heat load. For arid climates with a great wet-bulb depression, cooling towers can provide enough cooling during summer design conditions to be net zero. For example, a 371 m^{2} (4,000 ft^{2}) retail store in Tucson, Arizona with a sensible heat gain of 29.3 kJ/h (100,000 Btu/h) can be cooled entirely by two passive cooling towers providing 11890 m^{3}/h (7,000 cfm) each.

For the Zion National Park visitors' center, which uses two passive cooling towers, the cooling energy intensity was 14.5 MJ/m^{2} (1.28 kBtu/ft^{2};), which was 77% less than a typical building in the western United States that uses 62.5 MJ/m^{2} (5.5 kBtu/ft^{2}). A study of field performance results in Kuwait revealed that power requirements for an evaporative cooler are approximately 75% less than the power requirements for a conventional packaged unit air-conditioner.

=== Indirect evaporative cooling ===
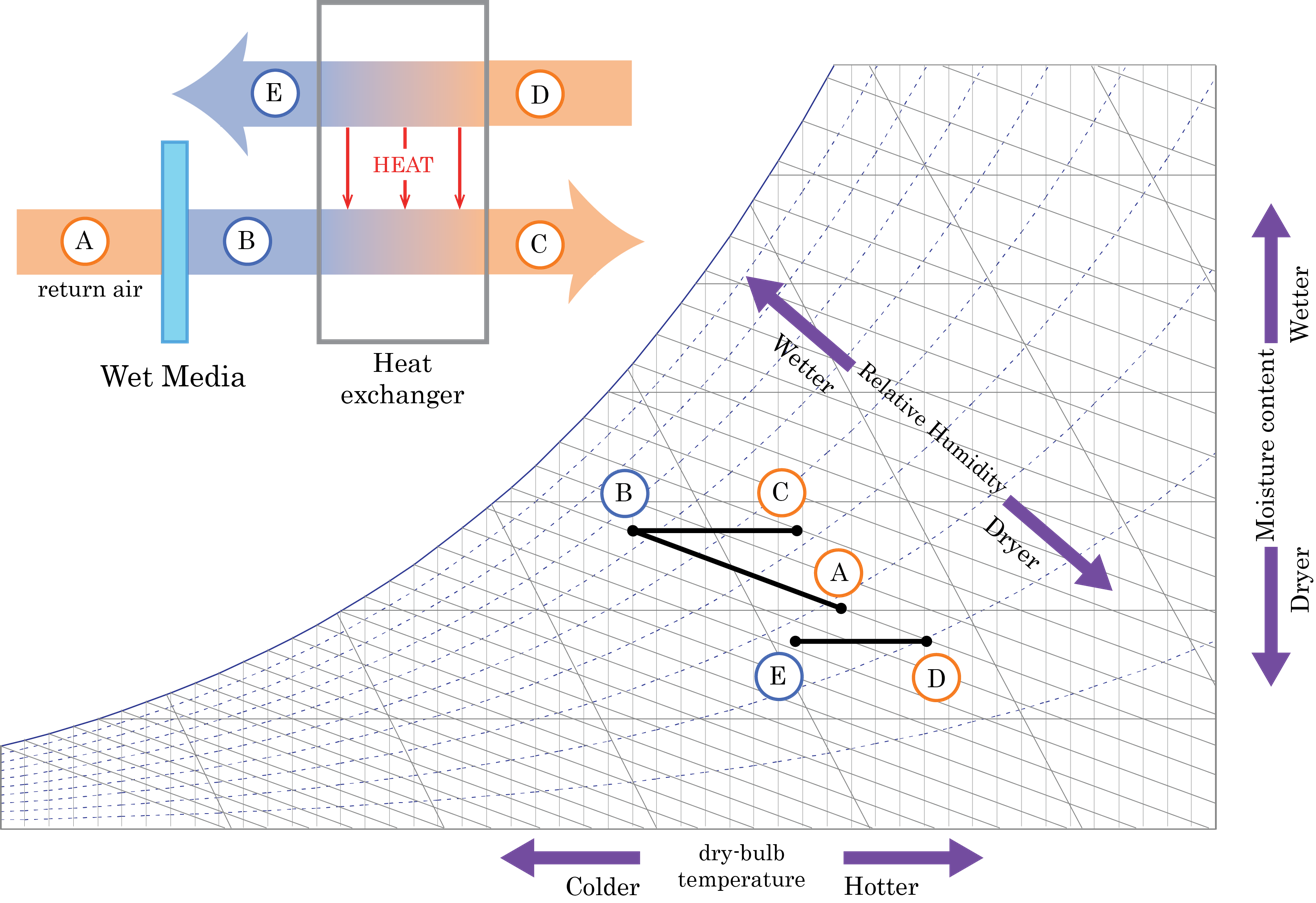
The process of indirect evaporative cooling

Indirect evaporative cooling (closed circuit) is a cooling process that uses direct evaporative cooling to cool air in a separate circuit, with a heat exchanger to transfer heat away from the supply air without adding water vapour to it.. It is a method of cooling air without adding moisture to the air supplied to a building. The cooled moist air from the direct evaporative cooling process never comes in direct contact with the conditioned supply air. The moist air stream is released outside or used to cool other external devices such as solar cells which are more efficient if kept cool. This is done to avoid excess humidity in enclosed spaces, which is not appropriate for residential systems.

==== How it works ====
Indirect evaporative cooling uses two separate air streams and an air-to-air heat exchanger. Water evaporates into a secondary air stream. Heat moves through the heat exchanger from the primary air stream to the secondary air stream. The cooled primary air is delivered to the building without added humidity. An indirect evaporative cooling system includes a heat exchanger, a water distribution system, and fans. Direct evaporative cooling adds moisture directly to the supply air.

==== Performance ====
Indirect evaporative cooling performs best in dry climates. Testing by the National Renewable Energy Laboratory showed lower energy use compared to conventional air conditioning in dry regions. Indirect evaporative cooling is used in commercial, industrial, and residential buildings. It is also used in data centers and ventilation systems.

==== Maisotsenko cycle ====
Indirect cooler manufacturer uses the Maisotsenko cycle (M-Cycle), named after inventor and Professor Dr. Valeriy Maisotsenko, employs an iterative (multi-step) heat exchanger made of a thin recyclable membrane that can reduce the temperature of product air to below the wet-bulb temperature, and can approach the dew point. Testing by the US Department of Energy found that a hybrid M-Cycle combined with a standard compression refrigeration system significantly improved efficiency by between 150 and 400% but was only capable of doing so in the dry western half of the US, and did not recommend being used in the much more humid eastern half of the US. The evaluation found that the system water consumption of 2–3 gallons per cooling ton (12,000 BTUs) was roughly equal in efficiency to the water consumption of new high efficiency power plants. This means the higher efficiency can be utilized to reduce load on the grid without requiring any additional water, and may actually reduce water usage if the source of the power does not have a high efficiency cooling system.

An M-Cycle based system built by Coolerado is currently being used to cool the Data Center for NASA's National Snow and Ice Data Center (NSIDC). The facility is air cooled below 70 degrees Fahrenheit and uses the Coolerado system above that temperature. This is possible because the air handler for the system uses fresh outside air, which allows it to automatically use cool outside ambient air when conditions allow. This avoids running the refrigeration system when unnecessary. It is powered by a solar panel array which also serves as secondary power in case of main power loss.

The system has very high efficiency but, like other evaporative cooling systems, is constrained by the ambient humidity levels, which has limited its adoption for residential use. It may be used as supplementary cooling during times of extreme heat without placing significant additional burden on electrical infrastructure. If a location has excess water supplies or excess desalination capacity it can be used to reduce excessive electrical demand by utilizing water in affordable M-Cycle units. Due to high costs of conventional air conditioning units and extreme limitations of many electrical utility systems, M-Cycle units may be the only appropriate cooling systems suitable for impoverished areas during times of extremely high temperature and high electrical demand. In developed areas, they may serve as supplemental backup systems in case of electrical overload, and can be used to boost efficiency of existing conventional systems.

The M-Cycle is not limited to cooling systems and can be applied to various technologies from Stirling engines to Atmospheric water generators. For cooling applications it can be used in both cross flow and counterflow configurations. Counterflow was found to obtain lower temperatures more suitable for home cooling, but cross flow was found to have a higher coefficient of performance (COP), and is therefore better for large industrial installations.

Unlike traditional refrigeration techniques, the COP of small systems remains high, as they do not require lift pumps or other equipment required for cooling towers. A 1.5 ton/4.4 kW cooling system requires just 200 watts for operation of the fan, giving a COP of 26.4 and an EER rating of 90. This does not take into account the energy required to purify or deliver the water, and is strictly the power required to run the device once water is supplied. Though desalination of water also presents a cost, the latent heat of vaporization of water is nearly 100 times higher than the energy required to purify the water itself. Furthermore, the device has a maximum efficiency of 55%, so its actual COP is much lower than this calculated value. However, regardless of these losses, the effective COP is still significantly higher than a conventional cooling system, even if water must first be purified by desalination. In areas where water is not available in any form, it can be used with a desiccant to recover water using available heat sources, such as solar thermal energy.

==== Theoretical designs ====
In the newer but yet-to-be-commercialized "cold-SNAP" design from Harvard's Wyss Institute, a 3D-printed ceramic conducts heat but is half-coated with a hydrophobic material that serves as a moisture barrier. While no moisture is added to the incoming air the relative humidity (RH) does rise a little according to the Temperature-RH formula. Still, the relatively dry air resulting from indirect evaporative cooling allows inhabitants' perspiration to evaporate more easily, increasing the relative effectiveness of this technique. Indirect Cooling is an effective strategy for hot-humid climates that cannot afford to increase the moisture content of the supply air due to indoor air quality and human thermal comfort concerns.

Passive indirect evaporative cooling strategies are rare because this strategy involves an architectural element to act as a heat exchanger (for example a roof). This element can be sprayed with water and cooled through the evaporation of the water on this element. These strategies are rare due to the high use of water, which also introduces the risk of water intrusion and compromising building structure.

=== Hybrid designs ===
==== Two-stage evaporative cooling, or indirect-direct ====
In the first stage of a two-stage cooler, warm air is pre-cooled indirectly without adding humidity (by passing inside a heat exchanger that is cooled by evaporation on the outside). In the direct stage, the pre-cooled air passes through a water-soaked pad and picks up humidity as it cools. Since the air supply is pre-cooled in the first stage, less humidity is transferred in the direct stage, to reach the desired cooling temperatures. The result, according to manufacturers, is cooler air with a RH between 50 and 70%, depending on the climate, compared to a traditional system that produces about 70–80% relative humidity in the conditioned air.

==== Evaporative + conventional backup ====
In another hybrid design, direct or indirect cooling has been combined with vapor-compression or absorption air conditioning to increase the overall efficiency and/or to reduce the temperature below the wet-bulb limit.

==== Evaporative + passive daytime radiative + thermal insulation ====
Evaporative cooling can be combined with passive daytime radiative cooling and thermal insulation to enhance cooling power with zero energy use, albeit with an occasional water "re-charge" depending on the climatic zone of the installation. The system, developed by Lu et al. "consists of a solar reflector, a water-rich and IR-emitting evaporative layer, and a vapor-permeable, IR-transparent, and solar-reflecting insulation layer," with the top layer enabling "heat removal through both evaporation and radiation while resisting environmental heating." The system demonstrated 300% higher ambient cooling power than stand-alone passive daytime radiative cooling and could extend the shelf life of food by 40% in cool humid climates and 200% in dry climates without refrigeration.

==== Membrane dehumidification and evaporative cooling ====
Conventional evaporative cooling only works with dry air, e.g. when the humidity ratio is below ~0.02 kg_{water}/kg_{air}. They also require substantial water inputs. To remove these limitations, dewpoint evaporative cooling can be hybridized with membrane dehumidification, using membranes that pass water vapor but block air. Air passing through these membranes can be concentrated with a compressor, so it can be condensed at warmer temperatures. The first configuration with this approach reused the dehumidification water to provide further evaporative cooling. Such an approach can fully provide its own water for evaporative cooling, outperforms a baseline desiccant wheel system under all conditions, and outperforms vapor compression in dry conditions. It can also allow for cooling at higher humidity without the use of refrigerants, many of which have substantial greenhouse gas potential.

=== Materials ===
Due to good cost/performance/longevity, most evaporative cooler pads still consist of excelsior (aspen wood fiber) inside a containment net, but some modern/niche evaporative coolers might use materials, such as certain plastics and melamine paper, to use as cooler-pad media to meet their requirements. Modern rigid media, commonly 8" or 12" thick, provides more surface area to draw moisture, and thus cools air more effectively than typically much thinner aspen media of around 1.5" per layer. Another material which is sometimes used is corrugated cardboard.

=== Design considerations ===
==== Water use ====
In arid and semi-arid climates, the scarcity of water makes water consumption a concern in cooling system design. From the installed water meters, 420938 L (111,200 gal) of water were consumed during 2002 for the two passive cooling towers at the Zion National Park visitors' center. However, such concerns are addressed by experts who note that baseload electricity generation usually requires a large amount of water in their cooling towers. Evaporative coolers use far less electricity than A/C, thus comparable water usage overall might be less, and cost less overall compared to chillers.

==== Shading ====
Allowing direct solar exposure to any surface which can transfer the extra heat to any part of the air flow through the unit will raise the temperature of the air. If the heat is transferred to the air prior to flowing through the pads, or if the sunlight warms the pads themselves, evaporation will increase, but the additional energy required to achieve this will not come from the energy contained in the ambient air, but will be supplied by the sun, and this will result not only in higher temperatures, but higher humidity as well, just as raising the inlet air temperature by any means, and heating the water prior to distribution over the pad by any means, would do. In a worst-case scenario, placing the cooler on a sunny roof where temperatures might be 30+ degrees more than a shaded area off the roof, could result in negated exhaust air temperatures being unchanged or even hotter from a well-functioning cooler producing a delta of -30 degrees. In addition, sunlight may degrade some media, and other components of the cooler. Therefore, shading is advisable in all circumstances, though the vertical aspect of the pads, and insulation between the exterior and interior horizontal (upwards facing) surfaces to minimise heat transfer will suffice.

==== Mechanical systems ====
Apart from fans used in mechanical evaporative cooling, pumps are the only other piece of mechanical equipment required for the evaporative cooling process in both mechanical and passive applications. Pumps can be used for either recirculating the water to the wet media pad or providing water at very high pressure to a mister system for a passive cooling tower. Pump specifications will vary depending on evaporation rates and media pad area. The Zion National Park visitors' center uses a 250 W (1/3 HP) pump.

==== Exhaust ====
For optimal cooling exhaust ducts and/or open windows must be sufficient in size to allow for several air exchanges per hour to pass through the air-conditioned area. Otherwise, a positive pressure might develop, lowering air exchanges, and the fan or blower in the system is unable to draw enough air through the cooling media resulting in less evaporation and lowering efficiency. The evaporative system cannot function effectively without exhausting a continuous supply of air from the air-conditioned area to the outside. By optimizing the placement of the cooled-air inlet, along with the layout of the house passages, related doors, and room windows, the system can be used most effectively to direct the cooled air to the required areas. A well-designed layout can effectively scavenge and expel the hot air from desired areas without the need for an above-ceiling ducted venting system. Continuous airflow is essential, so the exhaust windows or vents must not restrict the volume and passage of air being introduced by the evaporative cooling machine. One must also be mindful of the outside wind direction, as, for example, a strong hot southerly wind will slow or restrict the exhausted air from a south-facing window. It is always best to have the downwind windows open, while the upwind windows are closed.

== Different types of installations ==
=== Typical installations ===
Typically, residential and industrial evaporative coolers use direct evaporation, and can be described as an enclosed metal or plastic box with vented sides. Air is moved by a centrifugal fan or blower (usually driven by an electric motor with pulleys known as "sheaves" in HVAC terminology, or a direct-driven axial fan), and a water pump is used to wet the evaporative cooling pads. The cooling units can be mounted on the roof (down draft, or downflow) or exterior walls or windows (side draft, or horizontal flow) of buildings. To cool, the fan draws ambient air through vents on the unit's sides and through the damp pads. Heat in the air evaporates water from the pads which are constantly re-dampened to continue the cooling process. Then cooled, moist air is delivered into the building via a vent in the roof or wall.

Because the cooler's intake air originates outside the building, one or more large vents must exist to allow air to move from inside to outside. Air should only be allowed to pass once through the system, or the cooling effect will decrease with each reuse. This is due to the air reaching the saturation point. Often 15 or so air exchanges per hour (ACHs) occur in spaces served by evaporative coolers, a relatively high rate of air exchange to maintain peak cooling efficiency. In a worst-case scenario, placing a portable evaporative cooler in a sealed room will likely result in humid room that will eventually return to its original ambient temperature.

=== Evaporative (wet) cooling towers ===
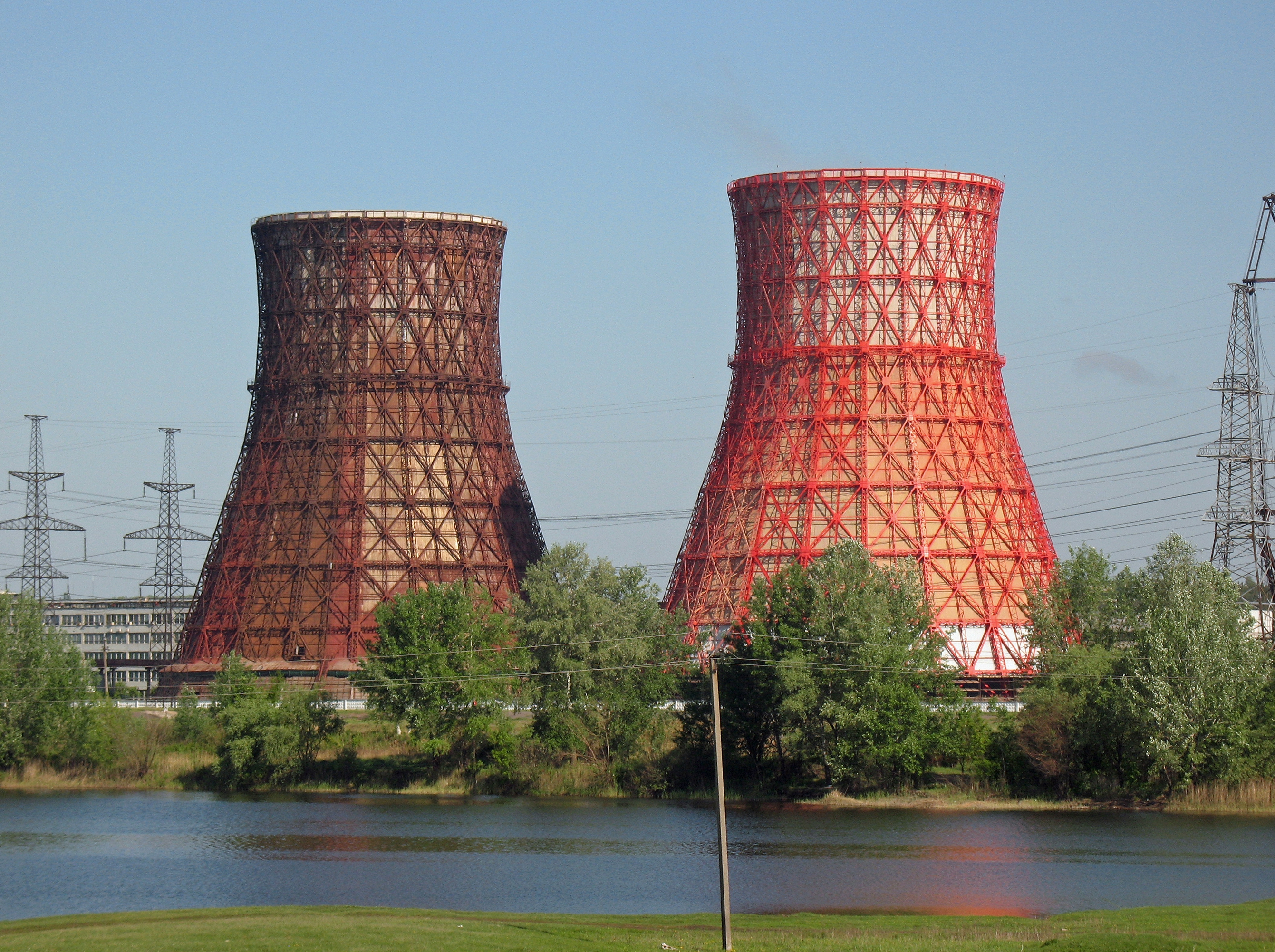
Large hyperboloid cooling towers made of structural steel for a power plant in Kharkiv (Ukraine)

Cooling towers are structures for cooling water or other heat transfer media to near-ambient wet-bulb temperature. Wet cooling towers operate on the evaporative cooling principle, but are optimized to cool the water rather than the air. Cooling towers can often be found on large buildings, baseload electricity plants, or on industrial sites. They transfer heat to the environment from chillers, industrial processes, or the Rankine power cycle, for example.

=== Misting systems ===
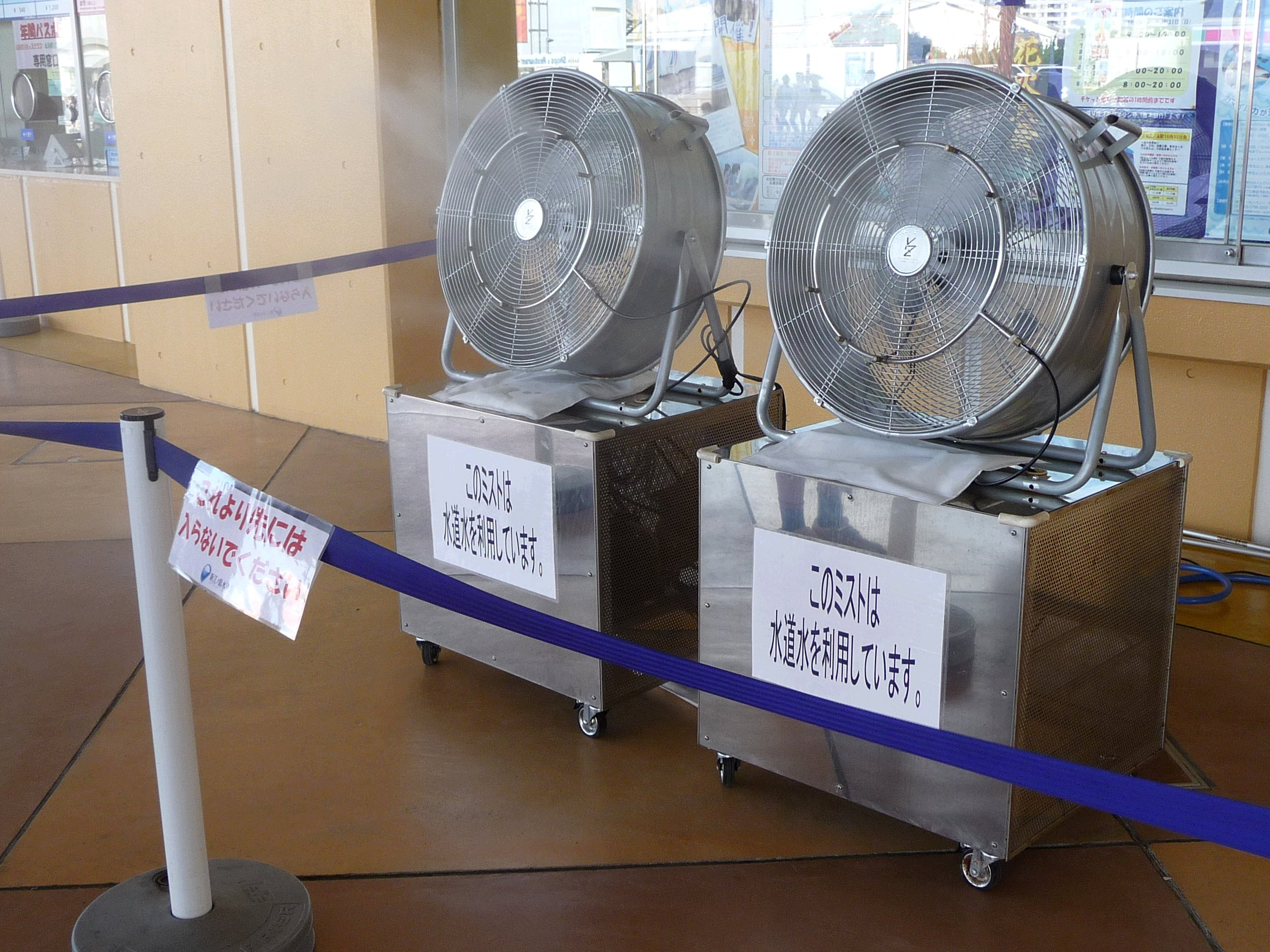
Mist spraying system with water pump beneath

Misting systems work by forcing water via a high pressure pump and tubing through a brass and stainless steel mist nozzle that has an orifice of about 5 micrometres, thereby producing a micro-fine mist. The water droplets that create the mist are so small that they instantly flash-evaporate. Flash evaporation can reduce the surrounding air temperature by as much as 35 °F (20 °C) in just seconds. For patio systems, it is ideal to mount the mist line approximately 8 to 10 feet (2.4 to 3.0 m) above the ground for optimum cooling. Misting is used for applications such as flowerbeds, pets, livestock, kennels, insect control, odor control, zoos, veterinary clinics, cooling of produce, and greenhouses.

==== Misting fans ====
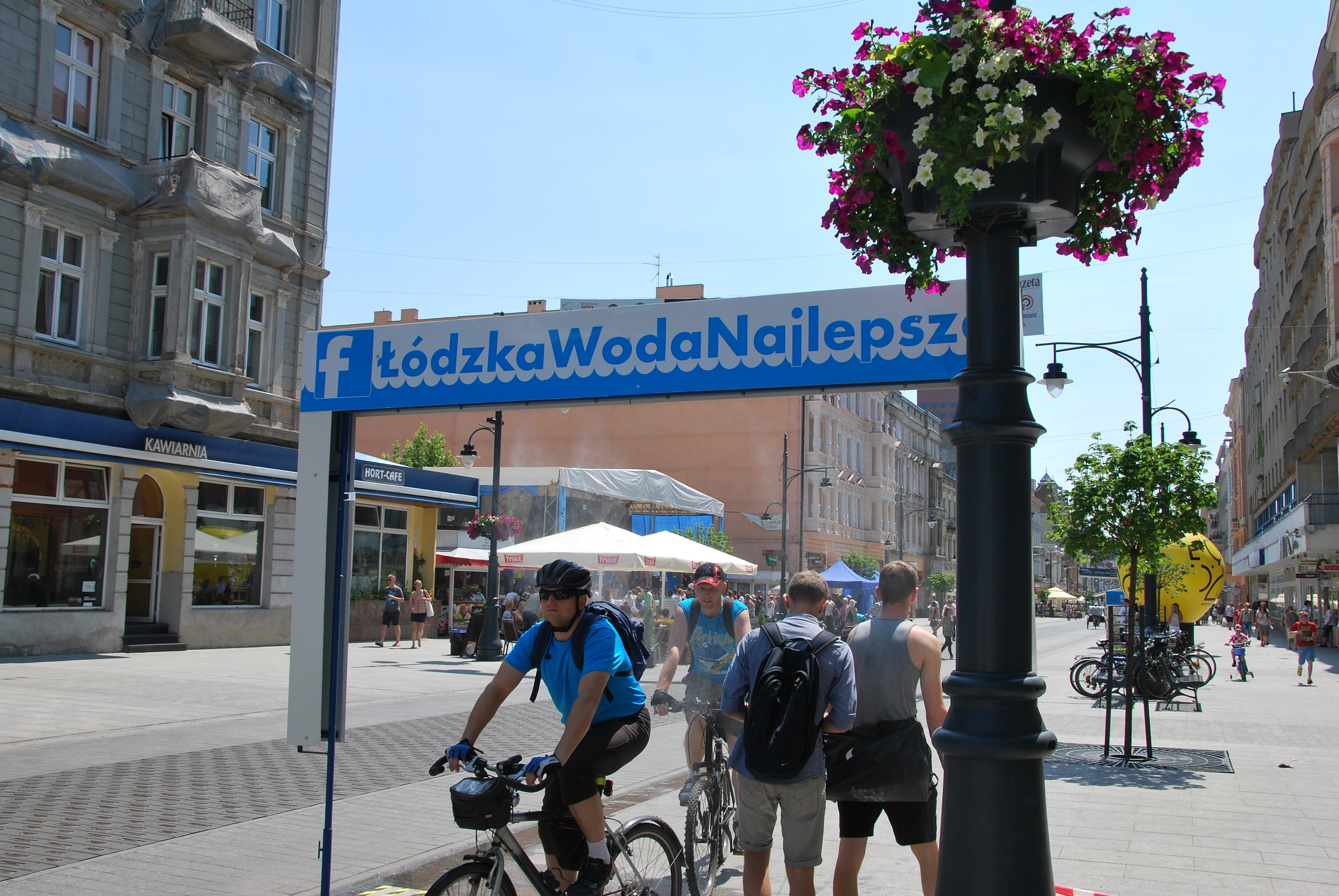
Water curtain misting fan on Piotrkowska Street in Łódź, June 2015

A misting fan is similar to a humidifier. A fan blows a fine mist of water into the air. If the air is not too humid, the water evaporates, absorbing heat from the air, allowing the misting fan to also work as an air cooler. A misting fan may be used outdoors, especially in a dry climate. During heat waves cities may set up misting fans for the public to cool off in.

Small portable battery-powered misting fans, consisting of an electric fan and a hand-operated water spray pump, are sold as novelty items. Their effectiveness in everyday use is unclear.

== Performance ==
Understanding evaporative cooling performance requires an understanding of psychrometrics. Evaporative cooling performance is variable due to changes in external temperature and humidity level. A residential cooler should be able to decrease the temperature of air to within 3 to 4 °C (5 to 7 °F) of the wet bulb temperature.

It is simple to predict cooler performance from standard weather report information. Because weather reports usually contain the dewpoint and relative humidity, but not the wet-bulb temperature, a psychrometric chart or a simple computer program must be used to compute the wet bulb temperature. Once the wet bulb temperature and the dry bulb temperature are identified, the cooling performance or leaving air temperature of the cooler may be determined.

For direct evaporative cooling, the direct saturation efficiency, $\epsilon$, measures in what extent the temperature of the air leaving the direct evaporative cooler is close to the wet-bulb temperature of the entering air. The direct saturation efficiency can be determined as follows:

$$\epsilon=\frac{T_{e,db}-T_{l,db}}{T_{e,db}-T_{e,wb}}$$

Where:

$\epsilon$ = direct evaporative cooling saturation efficiency (%)
$T_{e,db}$ = entering air dry-bulb temperature (°C)
$T_{l,db}$ = leaving air dry-bulb temperature (°C)
$T_{e,wb}$ = entering air wet-bulb temperature (°C)

Evaporative media efficiency usually runs between 80% and 90%. Most efficient systems can lower the dry air temperature to 95% of the wet-bulb temperature, the least efficient systems only achieve 50%. The evaporation efficiency drops very little over time.

Typical aspen pads used in residential evaporative coolers offer around 85% efficiency while CELdek type of evaporative media offer efficiencies of >90% depending on air velocity. The CELdek media is more often used in large commercial and industrial installations.

As an example, in Las Vegas, with a typical summer design day of 42 °C (108 °F) dry bulb and 19 °C (66 °F) wet bulb temperature or about 8% relative humidity, the leaving air temperature of a residential cooler with 85% efficiency would be:

$T_{l,db}$ = 42 °C – [(42 °C – 19 °C) × 85%] = 22.45 °C or 72.41 °F

A temperature delta of -36.4°F

However, either of two methods can be used to estimate performance:

- Use a psychrometric chart to calculate wet bulb temperature, and then add 5–7 °F as described above.
- Use a rule of thumb which estimates that the wet bulb temperature is approximately equal to the ambient temperature, minus one third of the difference between the ambient temperature and the dew point. As before, add 5–7 °F as described above.

Some examples clarify this relationship:

- At 32 °C (90 °F) and 15% relative humidity, air may be cooled to nearly 16 °C (61 °F). The dew point for these conditions is 2 °C (36 °F).
- At 32 °C and 50% relative humidity, air may be cooled to about 24 °C (75 °F). The dew point for these conditions is 20 °C (68 °F).
- At 40 °C (104 °F) and 15% relative humidity, air may be cooled to nearly 21 °C (70 °F). The dew point for these conditions is 8 °C (46 °F).

(Cooling examples extracted from the June 25, 2000 University of Idaho publication, "Homewise").

Because evaporative coolers perform best in dry conditions, they are widely used and most effective in arid, desert regions such as the southwestern USA, northern Mexico, and Rajasthan.

The same equation indicates why evaporative coolers are of limited use in highly humid environments: for example, a hot August day in Tokyo may be 30 °C (86 °F) with 85% relative humidity, 1,005 hPa pressure. This gives a dew point of 27.2 °C (81.0 °F) and a wet-bulb temperature of 27.88 °C (82.18 °F). According to the formula above, at 85% efficiency air may be cooled only down to 28.2 °C (82.8 °F) which makes it quite impractical.

== Comparison to other types of air conditioning ==
Comparison of evaporative cooling with refrigeration-based air conditioning:

=== Advantages ===
Installation and energy use

- Residential evaporative coolers can cost substantially less to install than central air-conditioning systems. Krigger and Dorsi estimated professional installation at about half or less of the cost of central refrigerated air conditioning. The U.S. Department of Energy similarly states that evaporative coolers cost about half as much to install as central air conditioners and use about one-quarter as much energy.
- Direct evaporative coolers do not use the energy-intensive compressor required by conventional vapor-compression air conditioning; their principal electrical loads are associated with moving air and circulating water.
- Direct evaporative cooling uses water as the evaporating fluid rather than a refrigerant circulating through a vapor-compression cycle.

Ventilation and humidity

- Direct evaporative coolers draw outdoor air through wetted media, cooling and humidifying the air before it enters the conditioned space.
- The added moisture can be beneficial in hot, dry climates, but it limits the usefulness of direct evaporative cooling where ambient humidity is already high.

=== Disadvantages ===
Performance

- The cooling capacity of direct evaporative systems depends on evaporation and is therefore greatest in arid climates. As ambient humidity rises, the potential temperature reduction decreases.
- Unlike conventional refrigerated air conditioning, direct evaporative cooling adds moisture to the supply air rather than dehumidifying it.
- Because its minimum achievable supply-air temperature is related to the outdoor wet-bulb temperature, a direct evaporative cooler generally cannot provide the same temperature reduction as vapor-compression air conditioning under humid conditions.

Water use and mineral deposits

- Evaporative coolers consume water to keep the cooling media wet. Systems may discharge unevaporated water or recirculate it through a reservoir.
- Evaporation leaves dissolved minerals behind. Scale and mineral deposits can accumulate on the pads, restrict airflow and reduce cooling performance.
- Bleed-off systems can reduce the concentration of minerals in recirculating water, although they increase water consumption. The U.S. Department of Energy recommends controlling bleed-off rates, replacing worn or damaged pads and periodically inspecting pumps and reservoir controls.
- Several cities are phasing out evaporative coolers because of water scarcity where water conservation is of greater importance than energy consuption

Maintenance and indoor air quality

- Residential evaporative coolers can affect the microbiological composition of indoor environments. A 2022 review found evidence that they may draw outdoor pollutants indoors or contribute to increased concentrations of some indoor bioaerosols, while also noting that evidence directly linking evaporative-cooler use to specific health outcomes remains limited.
- Standing water in evaporative coolers can provide mosquito breeding habitat if it is not properly managed. A field study in Rawalpindi, Pakistan, found that room evaporative coolers were among the container types with the highest breeding preference for Aedes aegypti larvae and pupae.

== See also ==
- Architectural engineering
- Botijo
- Building engineering
- Coolgardie safe
- Cooling tower
- Dehumidifier
- Humidifier
- HVAC
- Legionnaires' disease
- Pot-in-pot refrigerator
- The Shackleton Polarizer (a.k.a. The Shackleton Vaporizer)
- Yakhchāl
