= Pot-in-pot refrigerator =

Non-electric refrigeration method

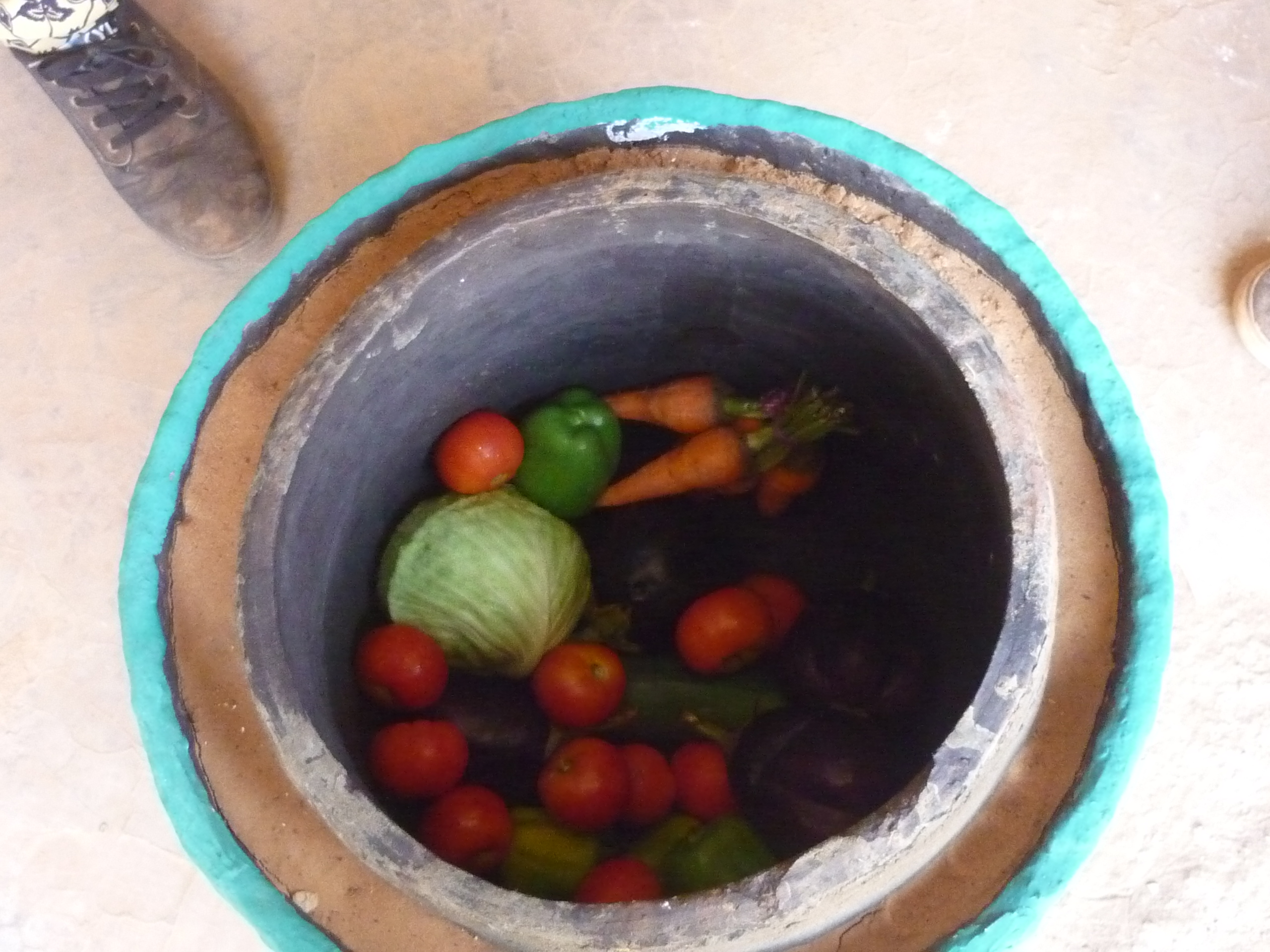
A clay pot cooler filled with vegetables

A pot-in-pot refrigerator, clay pot cooler or zeer (Arabic: زير) is a non-electric evaporative cooling refrigeration device. It uses a porous outer clay pot (lined with wet sand) containing an inner pot (which can be glazed to prevent penetration by the liquid) within which the food is placed. The evaporation of the outer liquid draws heat from the inner pot. The device can cool any substance, and requires only a flow of relatively dry air and a source of water.

== History ==
Many clay pots from around 3000 BC were discovered in the Indus Valley civilization and are considered to have been used for cooling as well as storing water. The pots are similar to the present-day ghara and matki used in India and Pakistan.

There is evidence that evaporative cooling may have been used in North Africa as early as the Old Kingdom of Egypt, circa 2500 BC. Frescoes show slaves fanning water jars, which would increase air flow around porous jars to aid evaporation and cooling the contents. These jars exist even today. They are called zeer, hence the name of the pot cooler. Despite being developed in Northern Africa, the technology appeared to have been forgotten since the advent of modern electrical refrigerators.

However, in the Indian subcontinent, ghara, matka and surahi, all of which are different types of clay water pots, are in everyday use to cool water. In Spain, botijos are popular. A botijo is a porous clay container used to keep and to cool water; they have been in use for centuries and are still in relatively widespread use. Botijos are favored most by those in the low Mediterranean climate; locally, the cooling effect is known as the "botijo effect".

In the 1890s, gold miners in Australia developed the Coolgardie safe, based on the same principles.

In rural northern Nigeria in the 1990s, Mohamed Bah Abba developed the Pot-in-Pot Preservation Cooling System, consisting of a small clay pot placed inside a larger one, with the space between the two filled with moist sand. The inner pot is filled with fruit, vegetables or soft drinks and covered with a wet cloth. Abba, who hails from a family of potmakers, tapped into the large unemployed local workforce and hired skilled potmakers to mass-produce the first batch of 5,000 Pot-in-Pots. He received the Rolex Award for Enterprise in 2001 and used his $75,000 award to make the invention available throughout Nigeria. Abba devised an educational campaign tailored to village life and the illiterate population featuring a video-recorded play by local actors to dramatise the benefits of the desert refrigerator. The pots sell at 40 US cents a pair.

After the millennium, several international NGOs began to work on the dissemination of this technology in various African countries: Practical Action in Sudan, Humanity First in Gambia and Movement e.V. in Burkina Faso.

Extensive research has also been done in Mali by D-Lab, in partnership with World Vegetable Center.

== Construction ==
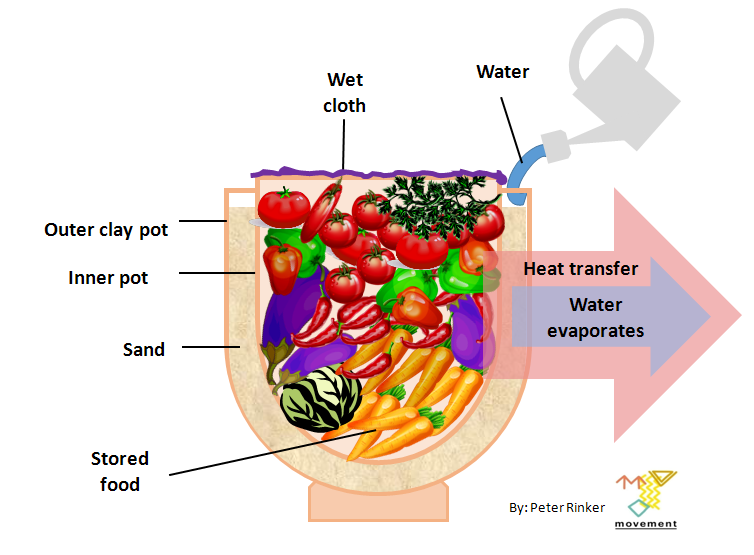
Functioning of a clay pot cooler

A zeer is constructed by placing a clay pot within a larger clay pot with wet sand in between the pots and a wet cloth on top.

The device cools as the water evaporates, allowing refrigeration in hot, dry climates. It must be placed in a dry, ventilated space for the water to evaporate effectively towards the outside. Evaporative coolers tend to perform poorly or not at all in climates with high ambient humidity, since the water is not able to evaporate well under these conditions.

If there is an impermeable separation layer between the food and the porous pots, undrinkable water such as seawater can be used to drive the cooling process without contaminating the contents. This is useful in arid locations near the ocean where drinkable water is a limited commodity, and can be accomplished by using a pot that has waterproof glaze or cement applied to the inner wall where the food is stored.

Extended operation is possible if the pots are able to draw water from a storage container, such as an inverted airtight jar, or if the pots are placed in a shallow pool of water. A strap can be used to tie the inner pot down to prevent it from floating, instead of using sand.

== Operating conditions ==
Several key considerations are important for determining if an evaporative cooling device will provide effective cooling and storage. ECCs (evaporative cooling chambers) and clay pot coolers provide the most benefits when they are used in low-humidity climates (less than 40% relative humidity), the temperature is relatively high (maximum daily temperature higher than 25 °C), water is available to add to the device between one and three times per day, and the device can be located in a shady and well-ventilated area. If any of these key criteria cannot be met, then ECCs or clay pot coolers may not provide sufficient benefits to justify their use.

== Effectiveness ==
The effectiveness of evaporative cooling varies with the temperature, humidity and airflow. Given a constant flow of cool, dry air, evaporative cooling can achieve temperatures as low as the wet-bulb temperature, the 100% humidity condition at the given temperature. Documented tables show the minimum temperature that can be achieved at different starting temperatures and percent humidities.

To determine the effectiveness of evaporative cooling chambers for specific uses, it is helpful to consider the following:

Type of vegetables or other products needing improved storage

ECCs or clay pot coolers provide benefits if post-harvest vegetable spoilage is the result of exposure to high temperatures, low humidity, animals, or insects. Some examples of vegetables that are particularly vulnerable to these conditions include eggplants, tomatoes, leafy greens, peppers, and okra. See the "Conclusions and Additional Resources" section of the Best Practices Guide for a more complete list of vegetables that can benefit from storage in an evaporative cooling device. Non-electric evaporative cooling devices – such as ECCs and clay pot coolers – are not suitable for items that require sustained temperatures below 20 °C (medicine, meat, and dairy products), or foods that require a low-humidity environment (onions, coffee, garlic, millet, and other grains).

Volume of vegetables stored at any one time

== Impact ==
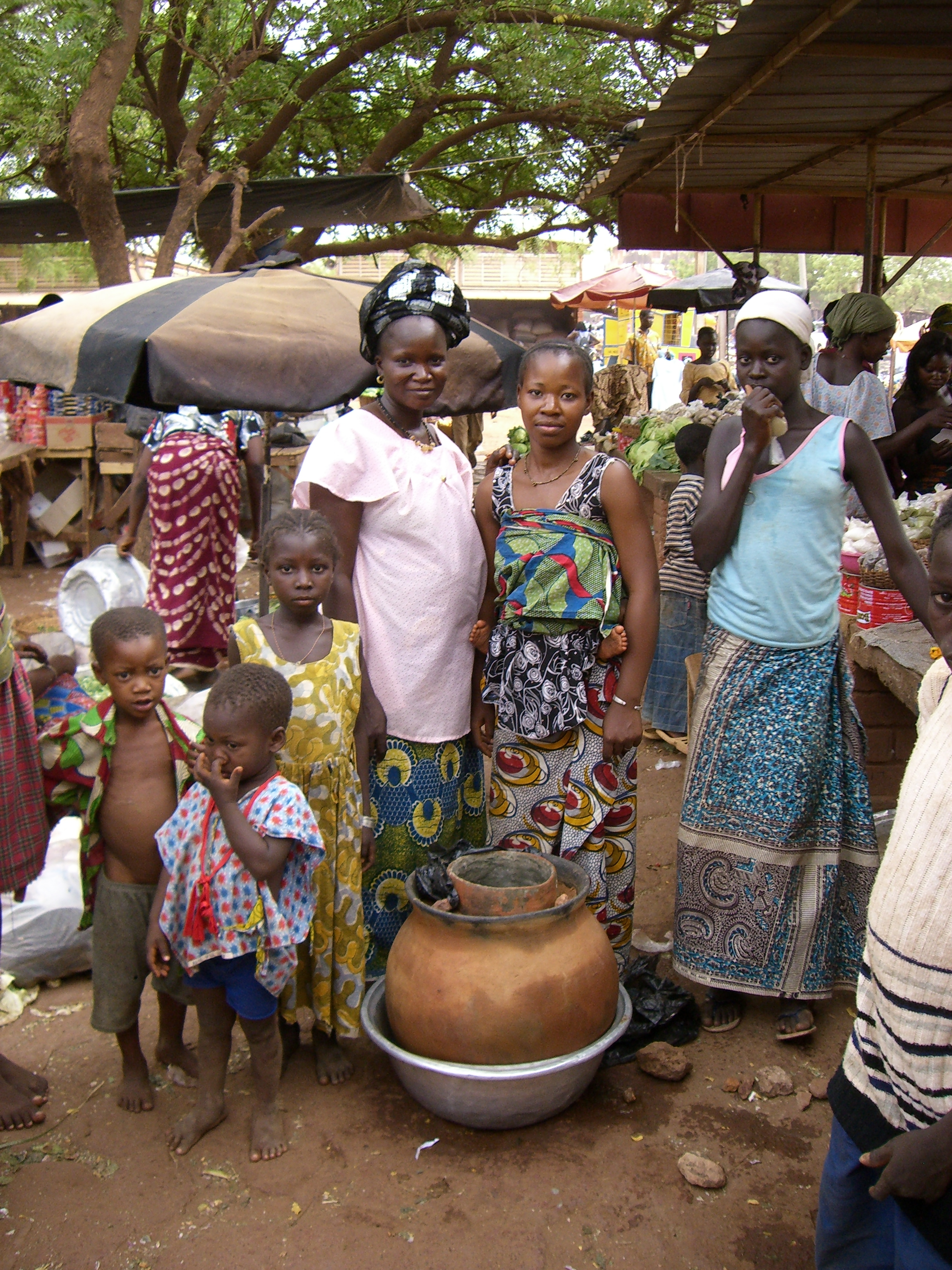
Clay pot cooler at a market in Ouahigouya, Burkina Faso

Pot-in-pot refrigeration has had multiple positive impacts on the population that uses them beyond the simple ability to keep food fresh for longer periods of time and decreasing instances of food-related disease.

- Increased profits from food sales: As there is no rush to sell food to avoid spoilage, farmers are able to sell their produce on demand and can command higher prices.
- Rural employment opportunities: Farmers are able to support themselves with their increased profits at market, slowing the move into cities. Also, the creation of the pots themselves generates job opportunities.
- Increased diet variety because fresh food is available for longer into the year.
- The ability to store vaccines and medicines that would otherwise be unavailable in areas without refrigeration facilities.

A zeer costs about 150 naira (approximately US$1.00 in 2011) to make in Nigeria, and they sell for 180-200 naira (US$1.20 to US$1.30 in 2011).

== See also ==
- Botijo (Spanish evaporative water cooler)
- Solar-powered refrigerator
- Evaporative cooler
- Coolgardie safe
- Mohammed Bah Abba

== Bibliography ==
- Oluwemimo Oluwasola: Pot-in-pot Enterprise: Fridge for the Poor. United Nations Development Programme, New York 2011. (Online pdf)
- Peter Rinker: Der Tonkrugkühler – eine angepasste Kühlmöglichkeit. Bau- und Nutzungsanleitung. Movement e. V., Teningen 2014. (Online article (pdf files in German/English/French are also linked))
