= Botijo =

Clay water container

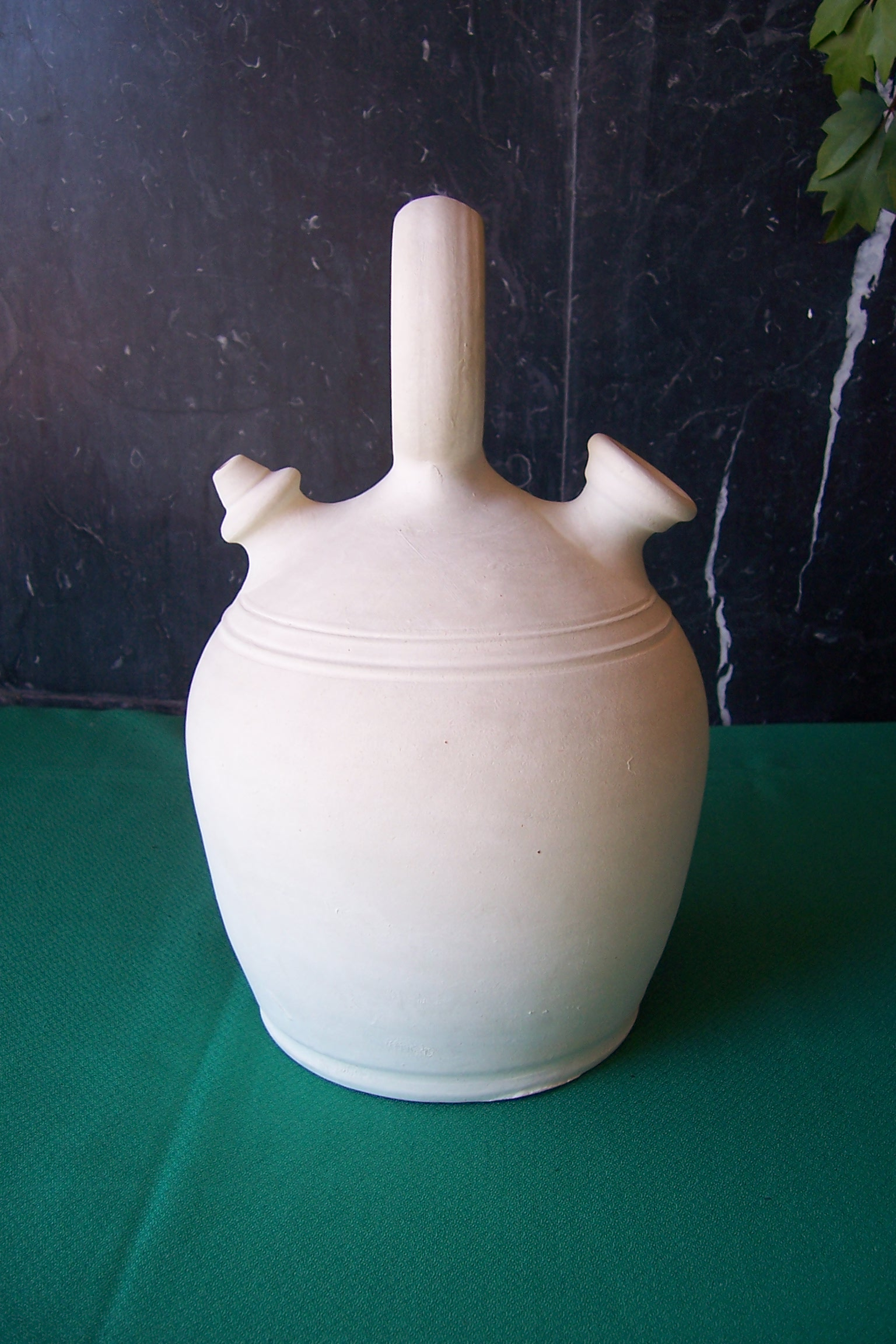
White botijo

A botijo, also called búcaro in Spanish, càntir and botija in Catalan,, botico in Aragonese, canabarro in Galician, txongil in Basque, and boteja in Hispanic America, is a traditional porous clay container designed to contain water. The botijo, or water jar, is a typical element of culture in many parts of Spain and may vary in shape and color. Although the botijo can, exceptionally, also be found in glass, metal or even plastic, it is usually and traditionally made of clay, due to the properties of this material, such that, once the botijo is filled, it cools the water that it contains, acting as an evaporative cooler.

The botijo has a wide belly and one or more mouths where it is filled and one or more outputs, called pitón or pitorro (in Spanish), to drink from.

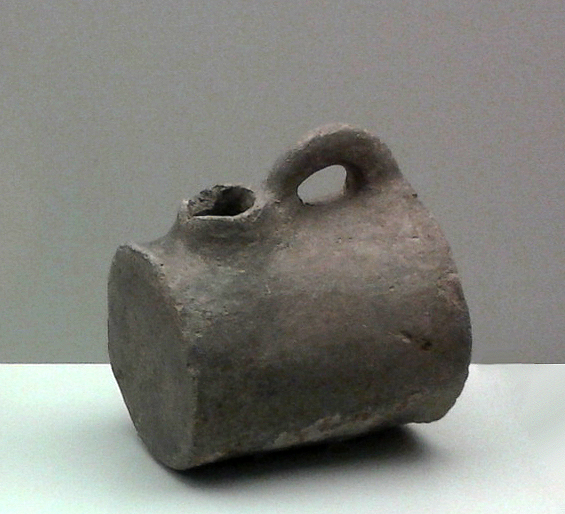
Early Bronze Age botijo of the Argaric culture. Beniaján (Murcia), Spain

The oldest botijo found on the Iberian Peninsula belongs to the Argaric culture and was discovered in the necropolis of Puntarrón Chico (Beniaján), near the capital of the Region of Murcia, where it is preserved in the Archaeological Museum of Murcia. It is an important piece in the historiography of ceramics, being a 'closed work' with a single hole of 2 cm (0.79 in) and the handle placed on the top; the dimensions of the pitcher are 11 cm × 9.5 cm (4.3 in × 3.7 in).

The búcaro de Indias is a special type, made of fragrant clay from Mexico, that was prized in Europe.

== Operation ==
The operating principle of the botijo, or any earthenware water jar, is as follows: the stored water is filtered through the pores of the clay and in contact with the outside dry environment (characteristic of Mediterranean climate), it evaporates, producing a cooling (2.219 kilojoules per gram of evaporated water). The key for cooling it, is by the evaporation of bleed water, as the water evaporates, it extracts thermal energy from the water stored inside the jug.

...because of the porous nature of the clay jar, which is unglazed, the water within will slowly seep out through the pores, and the warm air outside causes evaporation. This circulation and evaporation keeps the walls of the jar cool, and the water inside lowers in temperature, and becomes excellent for drinking.

== Gallery ==
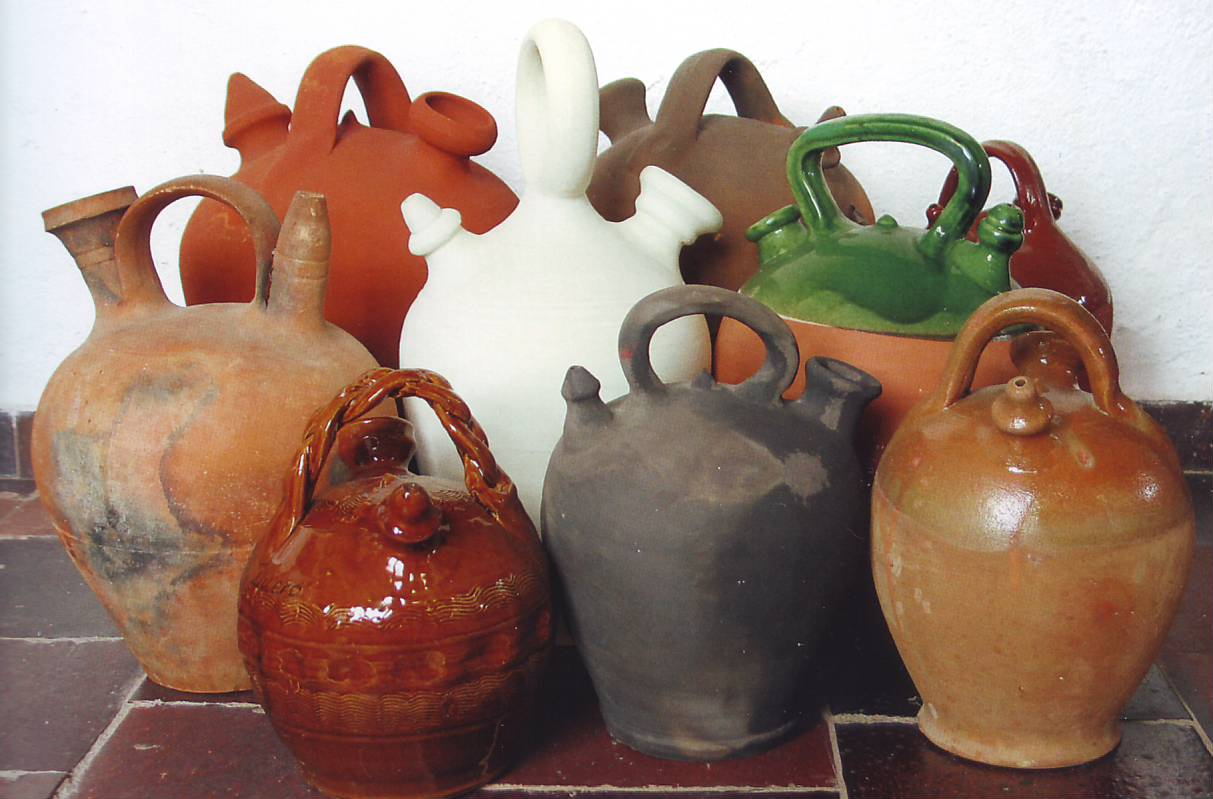
Botijo collection. Museo de Cerámica Nacional.

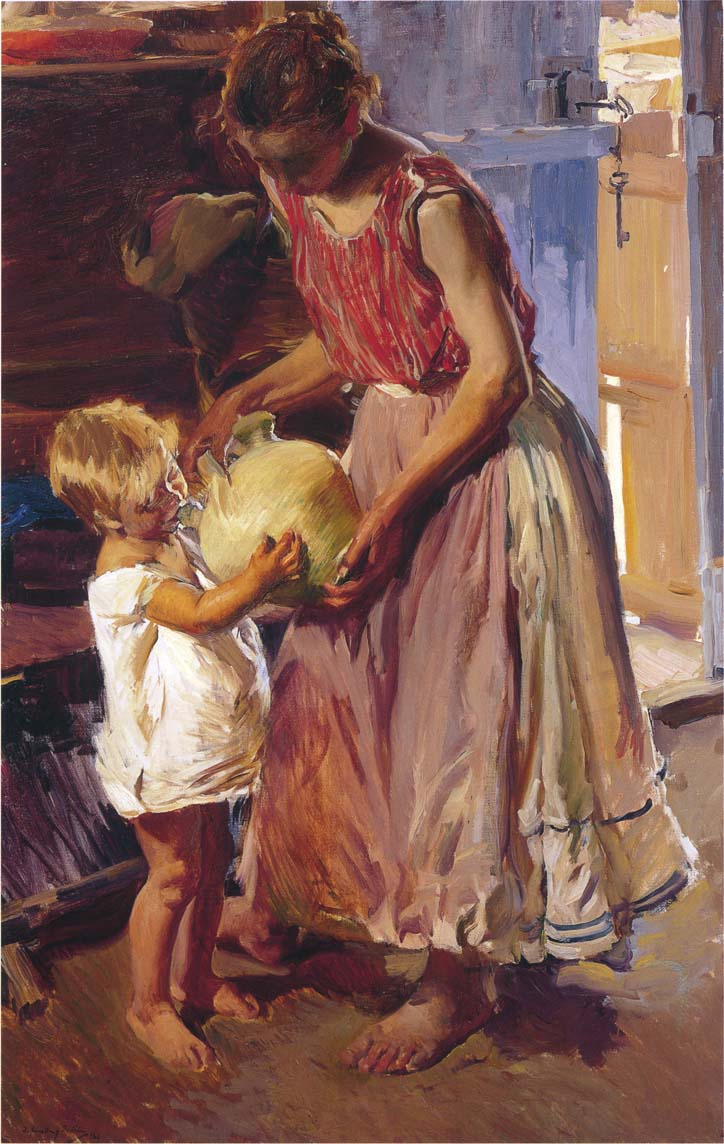
El botijo (c. 1904) by Joaquín Sorolla

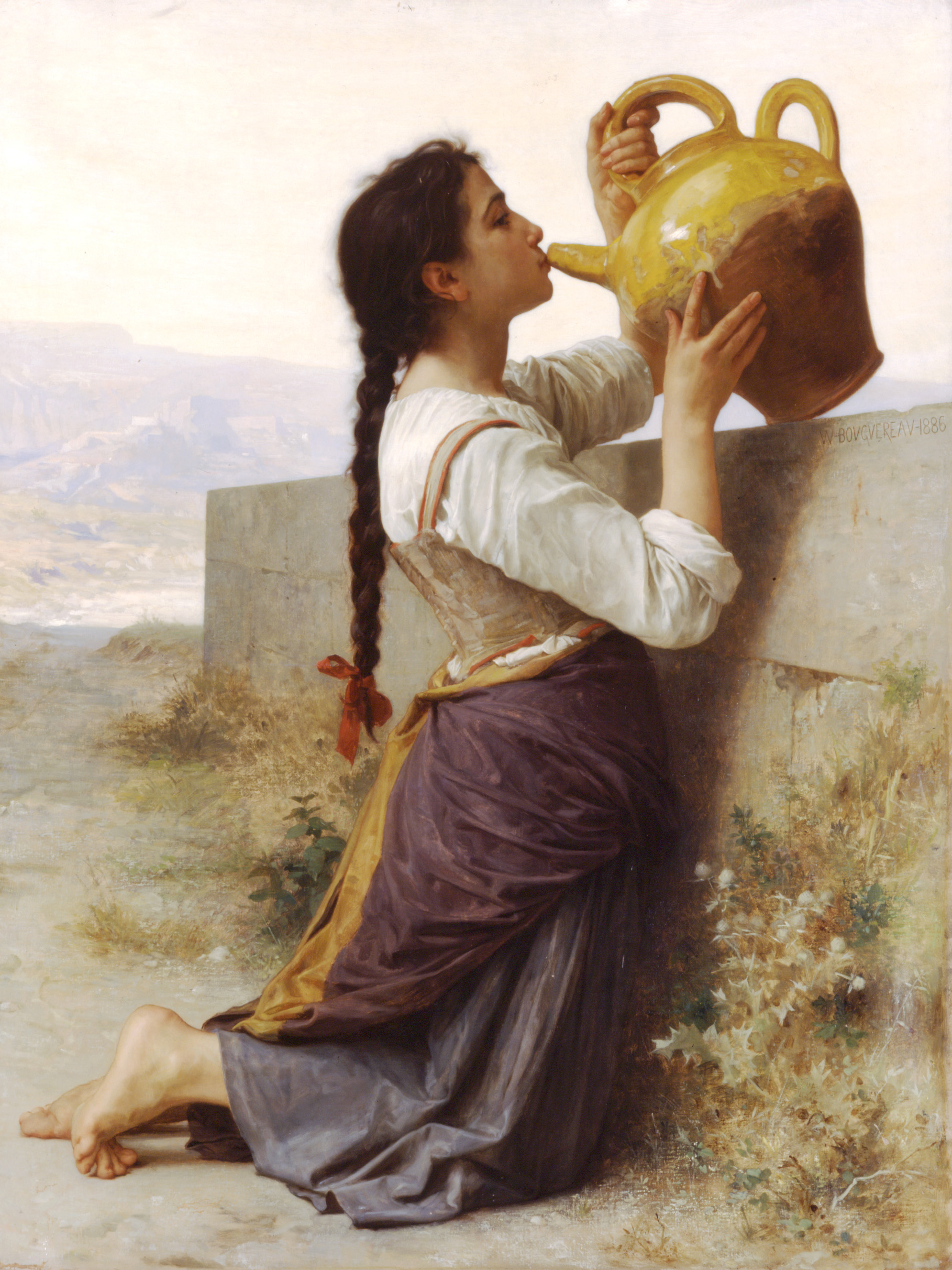
Thirst (1886) by William-Adolphe Bouguereau

== See also ==
- Olla
- Porró - another distinctively Spanish vessel, mainly traditional in Catalonia, Aragon, the Valencian Land and the Balearic Islands.
