= Airflow =

Movement of air

Airflow, or air flow, is the movement of air. Air behaves in a fluid manner, meaning particles naturally flow from areas of higher pressure to those where the pressure is lower. Atmospheric air pressure is directly related to altitude, temperature, and composition.

In engineering, airflow is a measurement of the amount of air per unit of time that flows through a particular device. It can be described as a volumetric flow rate (volume of air per unit time) or a mass flow rate (mass of air per unit time). What relates both forms of description is the air density, which is a function of pressure and temperature through the ideal gas law. The flow of air can be induced through mechanical means (such as by operating an electric or manual fan) or can take place passively, as a function of pressure differentials present in the environment.

Like any fluid, air may exhibit both laminar and turbulent flow patterns. Laminar flow occurs when air can flow smoothly, and exhibits a parabolic velocity profile; turbulent flow occurs when there is an irregularity (such as a disruption in the surface across which the fluid is flowing), which alters the direction of movement. Turbulent flow exhibits a flat velocity profile. Velocity profiles of fluid movement describe the spatial distribution of instantaneous velocity vectors across a given cross section. The size and shape of the geometric configuration that the fluid is traveling through, the fluid properties (such as viscosity), physical disruptions to the flow, and engineered components (e.g. pumps) that add energy to the flow are factors that determine what the velocity profile looks like. Generally, in encased flows, instantaneous velocity vectors are larger in magnitude in the middle of the profile due to the effect of friction from the material of the pipe, duct, or channel walls on nearby layers of fluid. In tropospheric atmospheric flows, velocity increases with elevation from ground level due to friction from obstructions like trees and hills slowing down airflow near the surface. The level of friction is quantified by a parameter called the "roughness length." Streamlines connect velocities and are tangential to the instantaneous direction of multiple velocity vectors. They can be curved and do not always follow the shape of the container. Additionally, they only exist in steady flows, i.e. flows whose velocity vectors do not change over time. In a laminar flow, all particles of the fluid are traveling in parallel lines which gives rise to parallel streamlines. In a turbulent flow, particles are traveling in random and chaotic directions which gives rise to curved, spiraling, and often intersecting streamlines.

The Reynolds number, a ratio indicating the relationship between viscous and inertial forces in a fluid, can be used to predict the transition from laminar to turbulent flow. Laminar flows occur at low Reynold's numbers where viscous forces dominate, and turbulent flows occur at high Reynold's numbers where inertial forces dominate. The range of Reynold's number that defines each type of flow depends on whether the air is moving through a pipe, wide duct, open channel, or around airfoils. Reynold's number can also characterize an object (for example, a particle under the effect of gravitational settling) moving through a fluid. This number and related concepts can be applied to studying flow in systems of all scales. Transitional flow is a mixture of turbulence in the center of the velocity profile and laminar flow near the edges. Each of these three flows have distinct mechanisms of frictional energy losses that give rise to different behavior. As a result, different equations are used to predict and quantify the behavior of each type of flow.

The speed at which a fluid flows past an object varies with distance from the object's surface. The region surrounding an object where the air speed approaches zero is known as the boundary layer. It is here that surface friction most affects flow; irregularities in surfaces may affect boundary layer thickness, and hence act to disrupt flow.

== Units ==
Typical units to express airflow are:

=== By volume ===
- m^{3}/min (cubic metres per minute)
- m^{3}/h (cubic metres per hour)
- ft^{3}/h (cubic feet per hour)
- ft^{3}/min (cubic feet per minute, a.k.a. CFM)
- l/s (litres per second)

=== By mass ===
- kg/s (kilograms per second)

Airflow can also be described in terms of air changes per hour (ACH), indicating full replacement of the volume of air filling the space in question. This unit is frequently used in the field of building science, with higher ACH values corresponding to leakier envelopes which are typical of older buildings that are less tightly sealed.

== Measurement ==
The instrument that measures airflow is called an airflow meter. Anemometers are also used to measure wind speed and indoor airflow.

There are a variety of types, including straight probe anemometers, designed to measure air velocity, differential pressure, temperature, and humidity; rotating vane anemometers, used for measuring air velocity and volumetric flow; and hot-sphere anemometers.

Anemometers may use ultrasound or resistive wire to measure the energy transfer between the measurement device and the passing particles. A hot-wire anemometer, for example, registers decreases in wire temperature, which can be translated into airflow velocity by analyzing the rate of change. Convective cooling is a function of airflow rate, and the electrical resistance of most metals is dependent upon the temperature of the metal, which is affected by the convective cooling. Engineers have taken advantage of these physical phenomena in the design and use of hot-wire anemometers. Some tools are capable of calculating air flow, wet bulb temperature, dew point, and turbulence.

== Simulation ==
Air flow can be simulated using computational fluid dynamics (CFD) modeling, or observed experimentally through the operation of a wind tunnel. This may be used to predict airflow patterns around automobiles, aircraft, and marine craft, as well as air penetration of a building envelope. Because CFD models "also track the flow of solids through a system," they can be used for analysis of pollution concentrations in indoor and outdoor environments. Particulate matter generated indoors generally comes from cooking with oil and combustion activities such as burning candles or firewood. In outdoor environments, particulate matter comes from direct sources such as internal combustion engine vehicles’ (ICEVs) tailpipe emissions from burning fuel (petroleum products), windblow and soil, and indirectly from atmospheric oxidation of volatile organic compounds (VOCs), sulfur dioxide (SO2), and nitrogen oxide (NOx) emissions.

== Control ==
One type of equipment that regulates the airflow in ducts is called a damper. The damper can be used to increase, decrease or completely stop the flow of air. A more complex device that can not only regulate the airflow but also has the ability to generate and condition airflow is an air handler. Fans also generate flows by "producing air flows with high volume and low pressure (although higher than ambient pressure)." This pressure differential induced by the fan is what causes air to flow. The direction of airflow is determined by the direction of the pressure gradient. Total or static pressure rise, and therefore by extension airflow rate, is determined primarily by the fan speed measured in revolutions per minute (RPM). In control of HVAC systems to modulate the airflow rate, one typically changes the fan speed, which often come in 3-category settings such as low, medium, and high.

== Uses ==
Measuring the airflow is necessary in many applications such as ventilation (to determine how much air is being replaced), pneumatic conveying (to control the air velocity and phase of transport) and engines (to control the Air–fuel ratio).

Aerodynamics is the branch of fluid dynamics (physics) that is specifically concerned with the measurement, simulation, and control of airflow. Managing airflow is of concern to many fields, including meteorology, aeronautics, medicine, mechanical engineering, civil engineering, environmental engineering and building science.

== Airflow in buildings ==
In building science, airflow is often addressed in terms of its desirability, for example in contrasting ventilation and infiltration. Ventilation is defined as the desired flow of fresh outdoor supply air to another, typically indoor, space, along with the simultaneous expulsion of exhaust air from indoors to the outdoors. This may be achieved through mechanical means (i.e. the use of a louver or damper for air intake and a fan to induce flow through ductwork) or through passive strategies (also known as natural ventilation). While natural ventilation has economic benefits over mechanical ventilation because it typically requires far less operational energy consumption, it can only be utilized during certain times of day and under certain outdoor conditions. If there is a large temperature difference between the outdoor air and indoor conditioned air, the use of natural ventilation may cause unintentional heating or cooling loads on a space and increase HVAC energy consumption to maintain comfortable temperatures within ranges determined by the heating and cooling setpoint temperatures. Natural ventilation also has the flaw that its feasibility is dependent on outdoor conditions; if outdoor air is significantly polluted with ground-level ozone concentrations from transportation related emissions or particulate matter from wildfires for example, residential and commercial building occupants may have to keep doors and windows closed to preserve indoor environmental quality (IEQ). By contrast, air infiltration is characterized as the uncontrolled influx of air through an inadequately-sealed building envelope, usually coupled with unintentional leakage of conditioned air from the interior of a building to the exterior.

Buildings may be ventilated using mechanical systems, passive systems or strategies, or a combination of the two.

=== Airflow in mechanical ventilation systems (HVAC) ===
Mechanical ventilation uses fans to induce flow of air into and through a building. Duct configuration and assembly affect air flow rates through the system. Dampers, valves, joints and other geometrical or material changes within a duct can lead to flow pressure (energy) losses.

=== Passive strategies for maximizing airflow ===
Passive ventilation strategies take advantage of inherent characteristics of air, specifically thermal buoyancy and pressure differentials, to evacuate exhaust air from within a building. Stack effect equates to using chimneys or similar tall spaces with openings near the top to passively draw exhaust air up and out of the space, thanks to the fact that air will rise when its temperature increases (as the volume increases and pressure decreases). Wind-driven passive ventilation relies on building configuration, orientation, and aperture distribution to take advantage of outdoor air movement. Cross-ventilation requires strategically-positioned openings aligned with local wind patterns.

=== Relationship of air movement to thermal comfort and overall indoor environmental quality (IEQ) ===
Airflow is a factor of concern when designing to meet occupant thermal comfort standards (such as ASHRAE 55). Varying rates of air movement may positively or negatively impact individuals’ perception of warmth or coolness, and hence their comfort. Air velocity interacts with air temperature, relative humidity, radiant temperature of surrounding surfaces and occupants, and occupant skin conductivity, resulting in particular thermal sensations.

Sufficient, properly-controlled and designed airflow (ventilation) is important for overall indoor environmental quality (IEQ) and indoor air quality (IAQ), in that it provides the necessary supply of fresh air and effectively evacuates exhaust air.

== See also ==
- Air current
- Air flow meter
- Air handling unit
- Anemometer
- Atmosphere of Earth
- Computational fluid dynamics
- Damper (flow)
- Fluid dynamics
- Infiltration (HVAC)
- Laminar flow
- Natural ventilation
- Particle tracking velocimetry
- Pressure gradient force
- Sea breeze
- Turbulent flow
- Ventilation (architecture)
- Volumetric flow rate
- Wind
