= ACPH =

ACPH may refer to:

- (acyl-carrier-protein) phosphodiesterase
- Air changes per hour
