= Ventilation (architecture) =

Intentional introduction of outside air into a space

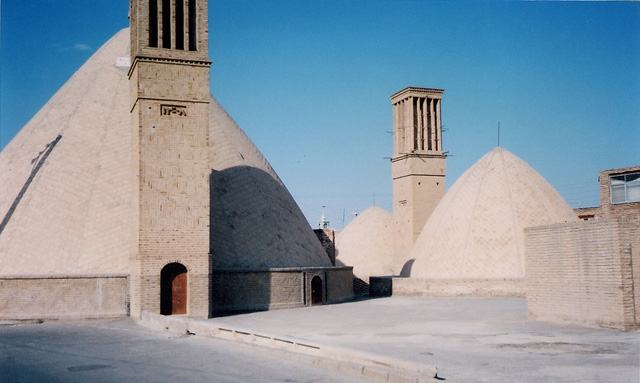
An Ab anbar (water reservoir) with double domes and windcatchers (openings near the top of the towers) in the central desert city of Naeen, Iran. Windcatchers are a form of natural ventilation.

Ventilation is the intentional introduction of outdoor air into a space, primarily to control indoor air quality by diluting and displacing indoor pollutants. It can also influence indoor temperature, humidity, and air movement, affecting thermal comfort and building energy use. Ventilation is important where combustion occurs indoors, as fireplaces, heaters, and other combustion sources consume oxygen and produce gases, smoke, and water vapor that may need to be removed.

Ventilation is commonly classified as natural ventilation, mechanical ventilation, or mixed-mode ventilation. Natural ventilation relies on passive forces such as wind pressure and the stack effect, while mechanical ventilation uses fans to move outdoor air into or out of a building. Mixed-mode systems combine natural and mechanical processes.

Ventilation design considers both the amount and distribution of airflow. Ventilation rates may be expressed as volumetric flow, as airflow per person or unit of floor area, or as air changes per hour (ACH). Airflow distribution affects ventilation effectiveness, while required ventilation rates can depend on occupancy and pollutant sources. Natural ventilation can reduce the risk of airborne disease transmission. If outdoor air is polluted, introducing it without adequate treatment can worsen indoor air quality. Demand-controlled and smart ventilation systems can adjust ventilation rates according to occupancy or environmental conditions to balance indoor air quality and energy use.

Ventilation rates are addressed by building codes and standards, including ASHRAE Standards 62.1 and 62.2. Passive ventilation techniques have been used since antiquity, while mechanically driven systems have been developed from the 18th century; modern ventilation-rate standards began to emerge in the 19th century.

== Types ==
=== Natural ===
Natural ventilation is the intentional passive flow of outdoor air into a building through planned openings (such as louvers, doors, and windows). Natural ventilation does not require mechanical systems to move outdoor air. Instead, it relies entirely on passive physical phenomena, such as wind pressure, or the stack effect. Almost all historic buildings were ventilated naturally. The technique was generally abandoned in larger US buildings during the late 20th century as the use of air conditioning became more widespread. However, with the advent of advanced Building Performance Simulation (BPS) software, improved Building Automation Systems (BAS), Leadership in Energy and Environmental Design (LEED) design requirements, and improved window manufacturing techniques; natural ventilation has made a resurgence in commercial buildings both globally and throughout the US.

Natural ventilation openings may be fixed, or adjustable. Adjustable openings may be controlled automatically (automated), owned by occupants (operable), or a combination of both. Cross ventilation is a phenomenon of natural ventilation.

Poor ventilation in rooms is identified to significantly increase the localized moldy smell in specific places of the room including room corners. There are three types of natural ventilation occurring in buildings: wind-driven ventilation, pressure-driven flows, and stack ventilation. The pressures generated by 'the stack effect' rely upon the buoyancy of heated or rising air. Wind-driven ventilation relies upon the force of the prevailing wind to pull and push air through the enclosed space as well as through breaches in the building's envelope.

The benefits of natural ventilation include:

- Improved indoor air quality (IAQ)
- Energy savings
- Reduction of greenhouse gas emissions
- Occupant control
- Reduction in occupant illness associated with sick building syndrome
- Increased worker productivity

Techniques and architectural features used to ventilate buildings and structures naturally include, but are not limited to:

- Operable windows
- Clerestory windows and vented skylights
- Night purge ventilation
- Building orientation
- Wind capture façades

=== Mechanical ===
Mechanical ventilation is the intentional fan-driven flow of outdoor air into and/or out from a building. Mechanical ventilation systems may include supply fans (which push outdoor air into a building), exhaust fans (which draw air out of a building and thereby cause equal ventilation flow into a building), or a combination of both (called balanced ventilation if it neither pressurizes nor depressurizes the inside air, or only slightly depressurizes it). Mechanical ventilation is often provided by equipment that is also used to heat and cool a space.

=== Mixed-mode ===
Mixed-mode ventilation systems use both mechanical and natural processes. The mechanical and natural components may be used at the same time, at different times of day, or in different seasons of the year. Since natural ventilation flow depends on environmental conditions, it may not always provide an appropriate amount of ventilation. In this case, mechanical systems may be used to supplement or regulate the naturally driven flow.

== Design of air flow in rooms ==
The air in a room can be supplied and removed in several ways, for example via ceiling ventilation, cross ventilation, floor ventilation or displacement ventilation.

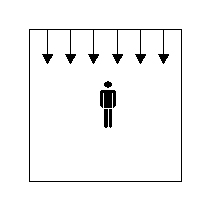
Ceiling ventilation

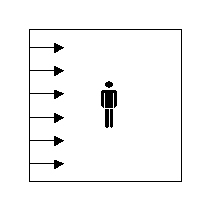
Cross ventilation

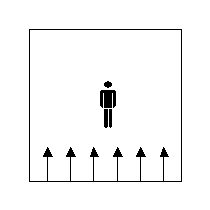
Floor ventilation

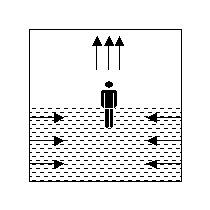
Displacement ventilation

Furthermore, the air can be circulated in the room using vortexes which can be initiated in various ways:

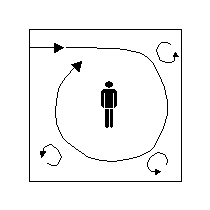
Tangential flow vortices, initiated horizontally

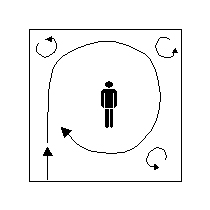
Tangential flow vortices, initiated vertically

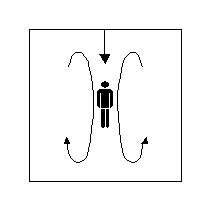
Diffused flow vortices from air nozzles

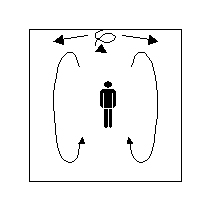
Diffused flow vortices due to roof vortices

== Ventilation rates for indoor air quality ==
The ventilation rate, for commercial, industrial, and institutional (CII) buildings, is normally expressed by the volumetric flow rate of outdoor air, introduced to the building. The typical units used are cubic feet per minute (CFM) in the imperial system, or liters per second (L/s) in the metric system (even though cubic meter per second is the preferred unit for volumetric flow rate in the SI system of units). The ventilation rate can also be expressed on a per person or per unit floor area basis, such as CFM/p or CFM/ft², or as air changes per hour (ACH).

=== Standards for residential buildings ===
For residential buildings, which mostly rely on infiltration for meeting their ventilation needs, a common ventilation rate measure is the air change rate (or air changes per hour): the hourly ventilation rate divided by the volume of the space (I or ACH; units of 1/h). During the winter, ACH may range from 0.50 to 0.41 in a tightly air-sealed house to 1.11 to 1.47 in a loosely air-sealed house.

ASHRAE now recommends ventilation rates dependent upon floor area, as a revision to the 62-2001 standard, in which the minimum ACH was 0.35, but no less than 15 CFM/person (7.1 L/s/person). As of 2003, the standard has been changed to 3 CFM/100 sq. ft. (15 L/s/100 sq. m.) plus 7.5 CFM/person (3.5 L/s/person).

=== Ventilation rate procedure ===
Ventilation Rate Procedure is rate based on standard and prescribes the rate at which ventilation air must be delivered to space and various means to the condition that air. Air quality is assessed (through CO_{2} measurement) and ventilation rates are mathematically derived using constants. The Indoor Air Quality Procedure uses one or more guidelines for the specification of acceptable concentrations of certain contaminants in indoor air but does not prescribe ventilation rates or air treatment methods. This addresses both quantitative and subjective evaluations and is based on the Ventilation Rate Procedure. It also accounts for potential contaminants that may have no measured limits, or for which no limits are not set (such as formaldehyde off-gassing from carpet and furniture).

== Airborne diseases ==
Natural ventilation is a key factor in reducing the spread of airborne illnesses such as tuberculosis, the common cold, influenza, meningitis or COVID-19. Opening doors and windows are good ways to maximize natural ventilation, which would make the risk of airborne contagion much lower than with costly and maintenance-requiring mechanical systems. Old-fashioned clinical areas with high ceilings and large windows provide the greatest protection. Natural ventilation costs little and is maintenance-free, and is particularly suited to limited-resource settings and tropical climates, where the burden of TB and institutional TB transmission is highest. In settings where respiratory isolation is difficult and climate permits, windows and doors should be opened to reduce the risk of airborne contagion. Natural ventilation requires little maintenance and is inexpensive.

Natural ventilation is not practical in much of the infrastructure because of climate. This means that the facilities need to have effective mechanical ventilation systems and or use Ceiling Level UV or FAR UV ventilation systems.

Ventilation is measured in terms of air changes per hour (ACH). As of 2023, the CDC recommends that all spaces have a minimum of 5 ACH. For hospital rooms with airborne contagions the CDC recommends a minimum of 12 ACH. However, there is a need to revise these recommendations to account for the combined effects of circulation patterns and ACH. Challenges in facility ventilation are public unawareness, ineffective government oversight, poor building codes that are based on comfort levels, poor system operations, poor maintenance, and lack of transparency.

Pressure, both political and economic, to improve energy conservation has led to decreased ventilation rates. Heating, ventilation, and air conditioning rates have dropped since the energy crisis in the 1970s and the banning of cigarette smoke in the 1980s and 1990s.

== Mechanical ventilation ==
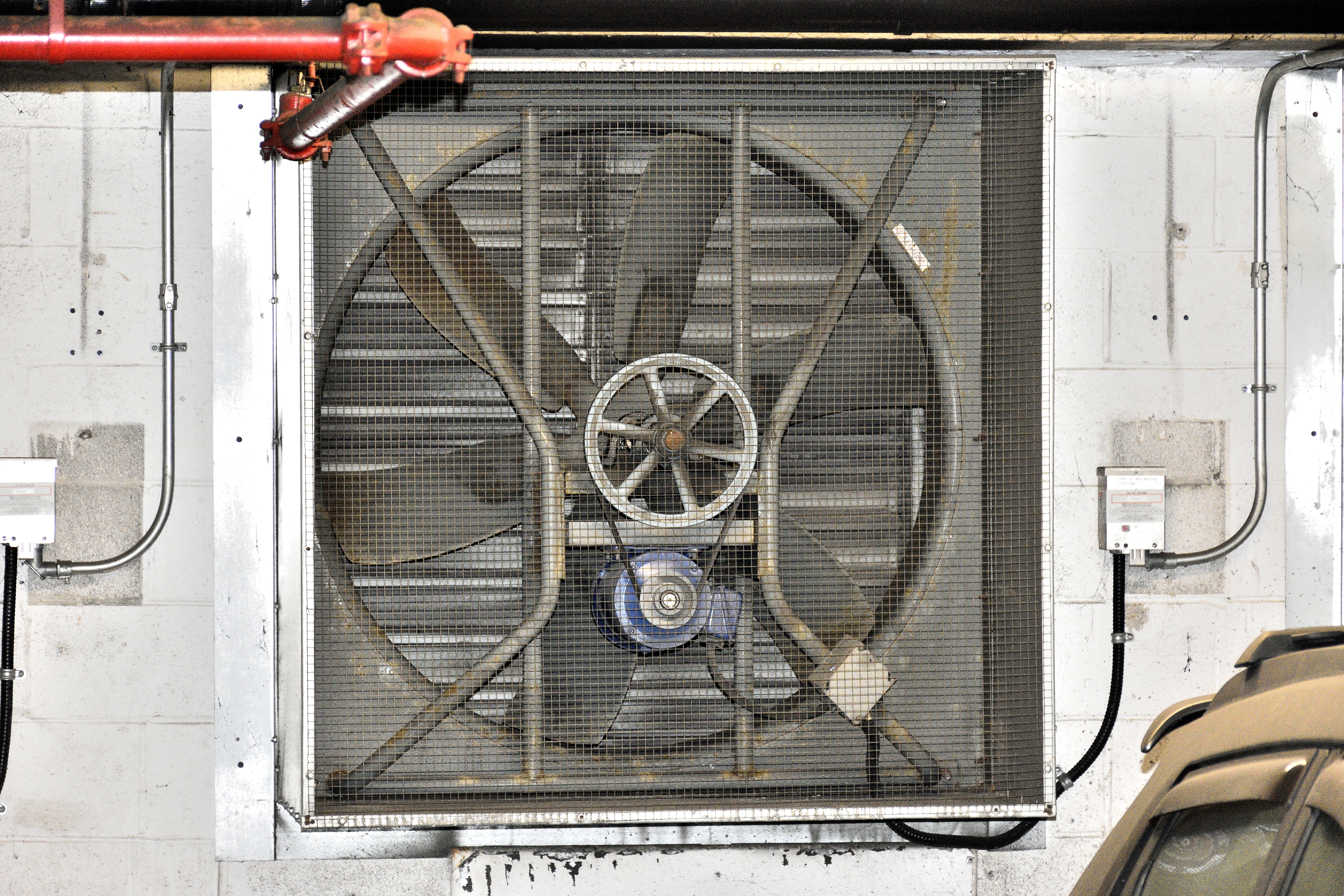
An axial belt-drive exhaust fan serving an underground car park. This exhaust fan's operation is interlocked with the concentration of contaminants emitted by internal combustion engines.

Mechanical ventilation of buildings and structures can be achieved by the use of the following techniques:

- Whole-house ventilation
- Mixing ventilation
- Displacement ventilation
- Dedicated subaerial air supply

=== Demand-controlled ventilation (DCV) ===
Demand-controlled ventilation (DCV, also known as Demand Control Ventilation) makes it possible to maintain air quality while conserving energy. ASHRAE has determined that "[i]t is consistent with the ventilation rate procedure that demand control be permitted for use to reduce the total outdoor air supply during periods of less occupancy." In a DCV system, CO_{2} sensors control the amount of ventilation. During peak occupancy, CO_{2} levels rise, and the system adjusts to deliver the same amount of outdoor air as would be used by the ventilation-rate procedure. However, when spaces are less occupied, CO_{2} levels reduce, and the system reduces ventilation to conserves energy. DCV is a well-established practice, and is required in high occupancy spaces by building energy standards such as ASHRAE 90.1.

=== Personalized ventilation ===
Personalized ventilation is an air distribution strategy that allows individuals to control the amount of ventilation received. The approach delivers fresh air more directly to the breathing zone and aims to improve the air quality of inhaled air. Personalized ventilation provides much higher ventilation effectiveness than conventional mixing ventilation systems by displacing pollution from the breathing zone with far less air volume. Beyond improved air quality benefits, the strategy can also improve occupants' thermal comfort, perceived air quality, and overall satisfaction with the indoor environment. Individuals' preferences for temperature and air movement are not equal, and so traditional approaches to homogeneous environmental control have failed to achieve high occupant satisfaction. Techniques such as personalized ventilation facilitate control of a more diverse thermal environment that can improve thermal satisfaction for most occupants. However, in some cases, conventional PV systems may cause discomfort and irritation when the jet delivers fresh air directly to the occupant's face at a relatively high speed in order to be effective in preventing airborne disease transmission. To address this issue, induction–removal systems were proposed by Zabihi et al. to control, collect, and remove harmful pathogens without directing the air jet toward the occupant's face.

=== Local exhaust ventilation ===
Local exhaust ventilation addresses the issue of avoiding the contamination of indoor air by specific high-emission sources by capturing airborne contaminants before they are spread into the environment. This can include water vapor control, lavatory effluent control, solvent vapors from industrial processes, and dust from wood- and metal-working machinery. Air can be exhausted through pressurized hoods or the use of fans and pressurizing a specific area.
A local exhaust system is composed of five basic parts:

1. A hood that captures the contaminant at its source
2. Ducts for transporting the air
3. An air-cleaning device that removes/minimizes the contaminant
4. A fan that moves the air through the system
5. An exhaust stack through which the contaminated air is discharged

In the UK, the use of LEV systems has regulations set out by the Health and Safety Executive (HSE) which are referred to as the Control of Substances Hazardous to Health (CoSHH). Under CoSHH, legislation is set to protect users of LEV systems by ensuring that all equipment is tested at least every fourteen months to ensure the LEV systems are performing adequately. All parts of the system must be visually inspected and thoroughly tested and where any parts are found to be defective, the inspector must issue a red label to identify the defective part and the issue.

The owner of the LEV system must then have the defective parts repaired or replaced before the system can be used.

== Smart ventilation ==
Smart ventilation is a process of continually adjusting the ventilation system in time, and optionally by location, to provide the desired IAQ benefits while minimizing energy consumption, utility bills, and other non-IAQ costs (such as thermal discomfort or noise). A smart ventilation system adjusts ventilation rates in time or by location in a building to be responsive to one or more of the following: occupancy, outdoor thermal and air quality conditions, electricity grid needs, direct sensing of contaminants, operation of other air moving and air cleaning systems. In addition, smart ventilation systems can provide information to building owners, occupants, and managers on operational energy consumption and indoor air quality as well as a signal when systems need maintenance or repair. Being responsive to occupancy means that a smart ventilation system can adjust ventilation depending on demand such as reducing ventilation if the building is unoccupied. Smart ventilation can time-shift ventilation to periods when a) indoor-outdoor temperature differences are smaller (and away from peak outdoor temperatures and humidity), b) when indoor-outdoor temperatures are appropriate for ventilative cooling, or c) when outdoor air quality is acceptable. Being responsive to electricity grid needs means providing flexibility to electricity demand (including direct signals from utilities) and integration with electric grid control strategies. Smart ventilation systems can have sensors to detect airflow, systems pressures, or fan energy use in such a way that systems failures can be detected and repaired, as well as when system components need maintenance, such as filter replacement.

== Ventilation and combustion ==
Combustion (in a fireplace, gas heater, candle, oil lamp, etc.) consumes oxygen while producing carbon dioxide and other unhealthy gases and smoke, requiring ventilation air. An open chimney promotes infiltration (i.e. natural ventilation) because of the negative pressure change induced by the buoyant, warmer air leaving through the chimney. The warm air is typically replaced by heavier, cold air.

Ventilation in a structure is also needed for removing water vapor produced by respiration, burning, and cooking, and for removing odors. If water vapor is permitted to accumulate, it may damage the structure, insulation, or finishes. When operating, an air conditioner usually removes excess moisture from the air. A dehumidifier may also be appropriate for removing airborne moisture.

== Calculation for acceptable ventilation rate ==
Ventilation guidelines are based on the minimum ventilation rate required to maintain acceptable levels of effluents. Carbon dioxide is used as a reference point, as it is the gas of highest emission at a relatively constant value of 0.005 L/s. The mass balance equation is:

$$Q = \frac{G}{C_\text{i}-C_\text{a}}$$

- Q = ventilation rate (L/s)
- G = CO_{2} generation rate
- C_{i} = acceptable indoor CO_{2} concentration
- C_{a} = ambient CO_{2} concentration

== Smoking and ventilation ==
ASHRAE standard 62 states that air removed from an area with environmental tobacco smoke shall not be recirculated into ETS-free air. A space with ETS requires more ventilation to achieve similar perceived air quality to that of a non-smoking environment.

The amount of ventilation in an ETS area is equal to the amount of an ETS-free area plus the amount V, where:

V = DSD × VA × A/60E

- V = recommended extra flow rate in CFM (L/s)
- DSD = design smoking density (estimated number of cigarettes smoked per hour per unit area)
- VA = volume of ventilation air per cigarette for the room being designed (ft^{3}/cig)
- E = contaminant removal effectiveness

== History ==
This ancient Roman house uses a variety of passive cooling and passive ventilation techniques. Heavy masonry walls, small exterior windows, and a narrow walled garden oriented N-S shade the house, preventing heat gain. The house opens onto a central atrium with an impluvium (open to the sky); the evaporative cooling of the water causes a cross-draft from atrium to garden.

Primitive ventilation systems were found at the Pločnik archeological site (belonging to the Vinča culture) in Serbia and were built into early copper smelting furnaces. The furnace, built on the outside of the workshop, featured earthen pipe-like air vents with hundreds of tiny holes in them and a prototype chimney to ensure air goes into the furnace to feed the fire and smoke comes out safely.

Passive ventilation and passive cooling systems were widely written about around the Mediterranean by Classical times. Both heat and cooling sources, such as fountains and subterranean heat reservoirs, were used to drive air circulation, and buildings were designed to encourage or exclude drafts, according to climate and function. Public bathhouses were often particularly sophisticated in their heating and cooling. Icehouses are some millennia old and were part of a well-developed ice industry by classical times.

The development of forced ventilation was spurred by the common belief in the late 18th and early 19th century in the miasma theory of disease, where stagnant 'airs' were thought to spread illness. An early method of ventilation was the use of a ventilating fire near an air vent which would forcibly cause the air in the building to circulate. English engineer John Theophilus Desaguliers provided an early example of this when he installed ventilating fires in the air tubes on the roof of the House of Commons. Starting with the Covent Garden Theatre, gas burning chandeliers on the ceiling were often specially designed to perform a ventilating role.

=== Mechanical systems ===
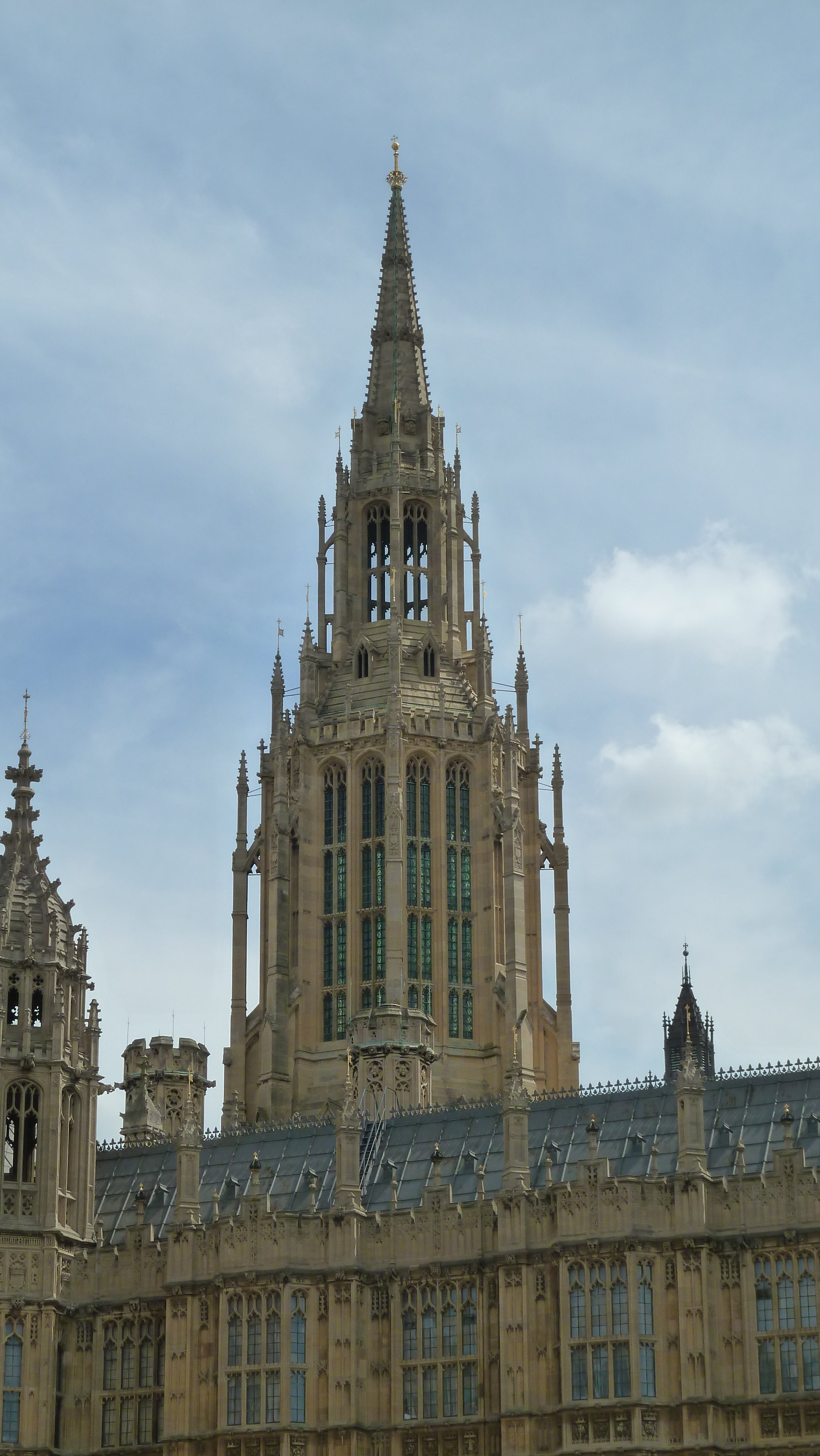
The Central Tower of the Palace of Westminster. This octagonal spire was for ventilation purposes, in the more complex system imposed by Reid on Barry, in which it was to draw air out of the Palace. The design was for the aesthetic disguise of its function.

A more sophisticated system involving the use of mechanical equipment to circulate the air was developed in the mid-19th century. A basic system of bellows was put in place to ventilate Newgate Prison and outlying buildings, by the engineer Stephen Hales in the mid-1700s. The problem with these early devices was that they required constant human labor to operate. David Boswell Reid was called to testify before a Parliamentary committee on proposed architectural designs for the new House of Commons, after the old one burned down in a fire in 1834. In January 1840 Reid was appointed by the committee for the House of Lords dealing with the construction of the replacement for the Houses of Parliament. The post was in the capacity of ventilation engineer, in effect; and with its creation there began a long series of quarrels between Reid and Charles Barry, the architect.

Reid advocated the installation of a very advanced ventilation system in the new House. His design had air being drawn into an underground chamber, where it would undergo either heating or cooling. It would then ascend into the chamber through thousands of small holes drilled into the floor, and would be extracted through the ceiling by a special ventilation fire within a great stack.

Reid's reputation was made by his work in Westminster. He was commissioned for an air quality survey in 1837 by the Leeds and Selby Railway in their tunnel. The steam vessels built for the Niger expedition of 1841 were fitted with ventilation systems based on Reid's Westminster model. Air was dried, filtered and passed over charcoal. Reid's ventilation method was also applied more fully to St. George's Hall, Liverpool, where the architect, Harvey Lonsdale Elmes, requested that Reid should be involved in ventilation design. Reid considered this the only building in which his system was completely carried out.

=== Fans ===
With the advent of practical steam power, ceiling fans could finally be used for ventilation. Reid installed four steam-powered fans in the ceiling of St George's Hospital in Liverpool, so that the pressure produced by the fans would force the incoming air upward and through vents in the ceiling. Reid's pioneering work provides the basis for ventilation systems to this day. He was remembered as "Dr. Reid the ventilator" in the twenty-first century in discussions of energy efficiency, by Lord Wade of Chorlton.

=== History and development of ventilation rate standards ===
Ventilating a space with fresh air aims to avoid "bad air". The study of what constitutes bad air dates back to the 1600s when the scientist Mayow studied asphyxia of animals in confined bottles. The poisonous component of air was later identified as carbon dioxide (CO_{2}), by Lavoisier in the very late 1700s, starting a debate as to the nature of "bad air" which humans perceive to be stuffy or unpleasant. Early hypotheses included excess concentrations of CO_{2} and oxygen depletion. However, by the late 1800s, scientists thought biological contamination, not oxygen or CO_{2}, was the primary component of unacceptable indoor air. However, it was noted as early as 1872 that CO_{2} concentration closely correlates to perceived air quality.

The first estimate of minimum ventilation rates was developed by Tredgold in 1836. This was followed by subsequent studies on the topic by Billings in 1886 and Flugge in 1905. The recommendations of Billings and Flugge were incorporated into numerous building codes from 1900–the 1920s and published as an industry standard by ASHVE (the predecessor to ASHRAE) in 1914.

The study continued into the varied effects of thermal comfort, oxygen, carbon dioxide, and biological contaminants. The research was conducted with human subjects in controlled test chambers. Two studies, published between 1909 and 1911, showed that carbon dioxide was not the offending component. Subjects remained satisfied in chambers with high levels of CO_{2}, so long as the chamber remained cool. Subsequently, it has been determined that CO_{2} is, in fact, harmful at concentrations over 50,000ppm.

ASHVE began a robust research effort in 1919. By 1935, ASHVE-funded research conducted by Lemberg, Brandt, and Morse – again using human subjects in test chambers – suggested the primary component of "bad air" was an odor, perceived by the human olfactory nerves. Human response to odor was found to be logarithmic to contaminant concentrations, and related to temperature. At lower, more comfortable temperatures, lower ventilation rates were satisfactory. A 1936 human test chamber study by Yaglou, Riley, and Coggins culminated much of this effort, considering odor, room volume, occupant age, cooling equipment effects, and recirculated air implications, which guided ventilation rates. The Yagle research has been validated, and adopted into industry standards, beginning with the ASA code in 1946. From this research base, ASHRAE (having replaced ASHVE) developed space-by-space recommendations, and published them as ASHRAE Standard 62-1975: Ventilation for acceptable indoor air quality.

As more architecture incorporated mechanical ventilation, the cost of outdoor air ventilation came under some scrutiny. In 1973, in response to the 1973 oil crisis and conservation concerns, ASHRAE Standards 62-73 and 62–81 reduced required ventilation from 10 CFM (4.76 L/s) per person to 5 CFM (2.37 L/s) per person. In cold, warm, humid, or dusty climates, it is preferable to minimize ventilation with outdoor air to conserve energy, cost, or filtration. This critique (e.g. Tiller) led ASHRAE to reduce outdoor ventilation rates in 1981, particularly in non-smoking areas. However subsequent research by Fanger, W. Cain, and Janssen validated the Yagle model. The reduced ventilation rates were found to be a contributing factor to sick building syndrome.

The 1989 ASHRAE standard (Standard 62–89) states that appropriate ventilation guidelines are 20 CFM (9.2 L/s) per person in an office building, and 15 CFM (7.1 L/s) per person for schools, while 2004 Standard 62.1-2004 has lower recommendations again (see tables below). ANSI/ASHRAE (Standard 62–89) speculated that "comfort (odor) criteria are likely to be satisfied if the ventilation rate is set so that 1,000 ppm CO_{2} is not exceeded" while OSHA has set a limit of 5000 ppm over 8 hours.

Historical ventilation rates
Author or source	Year	Ventilation rate (IP)	Ventilation rate (SI)	Basis or rationale
Tredgold	1836	4 CFM per person	2 L/s per person	Basic metabolic needs, breathing rate, and candle burning
Billings	1895	30 CFM per person	15 L/s per person	Indoor air hygiene, preventing spread of disease
Flugge	1905	30 CFM per person	15 L/s per person	Excessive temperature or unpleasant odor
ASHVE	1914	30 CFM per person	15 L/s per person	Based on Billings, Flugge and contemporaries
Early US Codes	1925	30 CFM per person	15 L/s per person	Same as above
Yaglou	1936	15 CFM per person	7.5 L/s per person	Odor control, outdoor air as a fraction of total air
ASA	1946	15 CFM per person	7.5 L/s per person	Based on Yahlou and contemporaries
ASHRAE	1975	15 CFM per person	7.5 L/s per person	Same as above
ASHRAE	1981	10 CFM per person	5 L/s per person	For non-smoking areas, reduced.
ASHRAE	1989	15 CFM per person	7.5 L/s per person	Based on Fanger, W. Cain, and Janssen

ASHRAE continues to publish space-by-space ventilation rate recommendations, which are decided by a consensus committee of industry experts. The modern descendants of ASHRAE standard 62-1975 are ASHRAE Standard 62.1, for non-residential spaces, and ASHRAE 62.2 for residences.

In 2004, the calculation method was revised to include both an occupant-based contamination component and an area–based contamination component. These two components are additive, to arrive at an overall ventilation rate. The change was made to recognize that densely populated areas were sometimes overventilated (leading to higher energy and cost) using a per-person methodology.

Occupant Based Ventilation Rates, ANSI/ASHRAE Standard 62.1-2004

IP Units	SI Units	Category	Examples
0 cfm/person	0 L/s/person	Spaces where ventilation requirements are primarily associated with building elements, not occupants.	Storage Rooms, Warehouses
5 cfm/person	2.5 L/s/person	Spaces occupied by adults, engaged in low levels of activity	Office space
7.5 cfm/person	3.5 L/s/person	Spaces where occupants are engaged in higher levels of activity, but not strenuous, or activities generating more contaminants	Retail spaces, lobbies
10 cfm/person	5 L/s/person	Spaces where occupants are engaged in more strenuous activity, but not exercise, or activities generating more contaminants	Classrooms, school settings
20 cfm/person	10 L/s/person	Spaces where occupants are engaged in exercise, or activities generating many contaminants	dance floors, exercise rooms

Area-based ventilation rates, ANSI/ASHRAE Standard 62.1-2004

IP Units	SI Units	Category	Examples
0.06 cfm/ft^{2}	0.30 L/s/m^{2}	Spaces where space contamination is normal, or similar to an office environment	Conference rooms, lobbies
0.12 cfm/ft^{2}	0.60 L/s/m^{2}	Spaces where space contamination is significantly higher than an office environment	Classrooms, museums
0.18 cfm/ft^{2}	0.90 L/s/m^{2}	Spaces where space contamination is even higher than the previous category	Laboratories, art classrooms
0.30 cfm/ft^{2}	1.5 L/s/m^{2}	Specific spaces in sports or entertainment where contaminants are released	Sports, entertainment
0.48 cfm/ft^{2}	2.4 L/s/m^{2}	Reserved for indoor swimming areas, where chemical concentrations are high	Indoor swimming areas

The addition of occupant- and area-based ventilation rates found in the tables above often results in significantly reduced rates compared to the former standard. This is compensated in other sections of the standard which require that this minimum amount of air is delivered to the breathing zone of the individual occupant at all times. The total outdoor air intake of the ventilation system (in multiple-zone variable air volume (VAV) systems) might therefore be similar to the airflow required by the 1989 standard.
From 1999 to 2010, there was considerable development of the application protocol for ventilation rates. These advancements address occupant- and process-based ventilation rates, room ventilation effectiveness, and system ventilation effectiveness

== Problems ==
- Outdoor air introduced for ventilation changes a building's moisture content. The associated latent load depends on the outdoor-air flow rate, the difference between indoor and outdoor humidity ratios, and the air properties and operating conditions, so it varies with climate and indoor design conditions. In hot, humid climates, ventilation together with cooling and indoor vapor sources can raise indoor relative humidity above acceptable levels and may require supplemental dehumidification.
- Ventilation efficiency is determined by design and layout, and is dependent upon the placement and proximity of diffusers and return air outlets. If they are located closely together, supply air may mix with stale air, decreasing the efficiency of the HVAC system, and creating air quality problems.
- System imbalances occur when components of the HVAC system are improperly adjusted or installed and can create pressure differences (too much-circulating air creating a draft or too little circulating air creating stagnancy).
- Cross-contamination occurs when pressure differences arise, forcing potentially contaminated air from one zone to an uncontaminated zone. This often involves undesired odors or VOCs.
- Re-entry of exhaust air occurs when exhaust outlets and fresh air intakes are either too close, prevailing winds change exhaust patterns or infiltration between intake and exhaust air flows.
- Entrainment of contaminated outdoor air through intake flows will result in indoor air contamination. There are a variety of contaminated air sources, ranging from industrial effluent to VOCs put off by nearby construction work. A recent study revealed that in urban European buildings equipped with ventilation systems lacking outdoor air filtration, the exposure to outdoor-originating pollutants indoors resulted in more Disability-Adjusted Life Years (DALYs) than exposure to indoor-emitted pollutants.

== See also ==
- Architectural engineering – Engineering discipline of engineering systems of buildings
- Cleanroom – Dust-free room for research or production
- Fume hood – Type of local ventilation device
- Heating, ventilation, and air conditioning – Technology of indoor and vehicular environmental comfort
- Heat recovery ventilation – Method of reusing thermal energy in a building
- Mechanical engineering – Engineering discipline
- Room air distribution – Air movement to, within, and from indoor spaces
- Sick building syndrome – Symptoms of illness attributed to a building
- Siheyuan – Historical type of residence in China
- Solar chimney – Ventilation using solar energy
- Tulou – Chinese rural dwellings
- Windcatcher – Architectural element for creating a draft
