= Stack effect =

Concept in physics

The stack effect or chimney effect is the movement of air into and out of buildings through unsealed openings, chimneys, flue-gas stacks, or other purposefully designed openings or containers, resulting from air buoyancy. Buoyancy occurs due to a difference in indoor-to-outdoor air density resulting from temperature and moisture differences. The result is either a positive or negative buoyancy force. The greater the thermal difference and the height of the structure, the greater the buoyancy force, and thus the stack effect. The stack effect can be useful to drive natural ventilation in certain climates, but in other circumstances may be a cause of unwanted air infiltration or fire hazard.

== In buildings ==
Since buildings are not totally sealed (at the very minimum, there is always a ground level entrance), the stack effect will cause air infiltration. During the heating season, the warmer indoor air rises up through the building and escapes at the top either through open windows, ventilation openings, or unintentional holes in ceilings, like ceiling fans and recessed lights. The rising warm air reduces the pressure in the base of the building, drawing cold air in through either open doors, windows, or other openings and leakage. During the cooling season, the stack effect is reversed, but is typically weaker due to lower temperature differences.

In a modern high-rise building with a well-sealed envelope, the stack effect can create significant pressure differences that must be given design consideration and may need to be addressed with mechanical ventilation. Stairwells, shafts, elevators, and the like, tend to contribute to the stack effect, while interior partitions, floors, and fire separations can mitigate it. Especially in case of fire, the stack effect needs to be controlled to prevent the spread of smoke and fire, and to maintain tenable conditions for occupants and firefighters. While natural ventilation methods may be effective, such as air outlets being installed closer to the ground, mechanical ventilation is often preferred for taller structures or in buildings with limited space. Smoke extraction is a key consideration in new constructions and must be evaluated in design stages.

The stack effect can also exacerbate the spreading of fire, especially in tall buildings where design flaws allow the formation of unwanted drafts. Examples include the Kaprun tunnel fire, King's Cross underground station fire and the Grenfell Tower fire, as a result of which 72 people died. The latter of these was in part exacerbated by the stack effect, when a cavity between the outer aluminium cladding and the inner insulation inadvertently formed a chimney and drew the fire upwards. It has also been bruited as a major contributing factor in the 2025 Wang Fuk Court fire in Hong Kong.

=== Usefulness in passive cooling ===
Some buildings are designed with strategically placed openings at different heights to induce the stack effect where cool air enters through low-level windows or vents, and warm air escapes through higher-level openings like skylights, roof vents, or clerestory windows. This vertical movement of air creates a natural ventilation system that can significantly reduce indoor temperatures. Combining the stack effect with cross ventilation, where airflow moves across the building from one side to the other, can enhance the overall cooling effect.

The stack effect is used both in traditional buildings and modern green architecture. Examples of traditional usage include the Windcatchers common in West Asian architecture, which capture and direct cooler breezes into the building while expelling hot air to maintain comfortable indoor temperatures. Contemporary sustainable buildings often make use of the stack effect along with related non-electric techniques like ground coupling, earth sheltering, and evaporative cooling to enhance the passive cooling profile of a building. By carefully designing the building's structure, orientation and ventilation paths, architects can leverage the stack effect to reduce reliance on mechanical cooling systems and improve overall energy efficiency.

=== Normal and reverse stack effect ===
Two regimes of stack effect can exist in buildings: normal and reverse. Normal stack effect occurs in buildings which are maintained at a higher temperature than the outdoor environment. Warm air within the building has a low density (or high specific volume) and exhibits a greater buoyancy force. Consequently, it rises from lower levels to upper levels through penetrations between floors. This presents a situation where floors underneath the neutral axis of the building have a net negative pressure, whereas floors above the neutral axis have a net positive pressure. The net negative pressure on lower floors can induce outdoor air to infiltrate the building through doors, windows, or ductwork without backdraft dampers. Warm air will attempt to exfiltrate the building envelope through floors above the neutral axis.

Mechanical refrigeration equipment provides sensible and latent cooling during summer months. This reduces the dry-bulb temperature of the air within the building relative to the outdoor ambient air. It also decreases the specific volume of the air contained within the building, thereby reducing the buoyancy force. Consequently, cool air will travel vertically down the building through elevator shafts, stairwells, and unsealed utility penetrations (i.e., hydronics, electric and water risers). Once the conditioned air reaches the bottom floors underneath the neutral axis, it exfiltrates the building envelopes through unsealed openings such as through dampers, curtainwall, etc. The exfiltrating air on floors underneath the neutral axis will induce outdoor air to infiltrate the building envelope through unsealed openings.

== In flue gas stacks and chimneys ==
The stack effect in chimneys: the gauges represent absolute air pressure and the airflow is indicated with light grey arrows. The gauge dials move clockwise with increasing pressure.

The stack effect in industrial flue gas stacks is similar to that in buildings, except that it involves hot flue gases having large temperature differences with the ambient outside air. Furthermore, an industrial flue gas stack typically provides little obstruction for the flue gas along its length and is, in fact, normally optimized to enhance the stack effect to reduce fan energy requirements.

Large temperature differences between the outside air and the flue gases can create a strong stack effect in chimneys for buildings using a fireplace for heating.

Before the development of large volume fans, mines were ventilated using the stack effect. A downcast shaft allowed air into the mine. At the foot of the upcast shaft a furnace was kept continuously burning. The shaft (commonly several hundred yards deep) behaved like a chimney and air rose through it drawing fresh air down the downcast stack and around the mine.

== Cause ==
There is a pressure difference between the outside air and the air inside the building caused by the difference in temperature between the outside air and the inside air. That pressure difference ( ΔP ) is the driving force for the stack effect and it can be calculated with the equations presented below. The equations apply only to buildings where air is both inside and outside the buildings. For buildings with one or two floors, h is the height of the building. For multi-floor, high-rise buildings, h is the distance from the openings at the neutral pressure level (NPL) of the building to either the topmost openings or the lowest openings. Reference explains how the NPL affects the stack effect in high-rise buildings.

For flue gas stacks and chimneys, where air is on the outside and combustion flue gases are on the inside, the equations will only provide an approximation and h is the height of the flue gas stack or chimney.

$$\Delta P = C a h \bigg(\frac {1}{T_o} - \frac {1}{T_i}\bigg)$$

SI units:

where:
ΔP	= available pressure difference, in Pa
C	= 0.0342, in K/m
a	= atmospheric pressure, in Pa
h	= height or distance, in m
T_{o}	= absolute outside temperature, in K
T_{i}	= absolute inside temperature, in K

U.S. customary units:

where:
ΔP	= available pressure difference, in psi
C	= 0.0188, in °R/ft
a	= atmospheric pressure, in psi
h	= height or distance, in ft
T_{o}	= absolute outside temperature, in °R
T_{i}	= absolute inside temperature, in °R

== Induced flow ==
The draft (draught in British English) flow rate induced by the stack effect can be calculated with the equation presented below. The equation applies only to buildings where air is both inside and outside the buildings. For buildings with one or two floors, h is the height of the building and A is the flow area of the openings. For multi-floor, high-rise buildings, A is the flow area of the openings and h is the distance from the openings at the neutral pressure level (NPL) of the building to either the topmost openings or the lowest openings. Reference explains how the NPL affects the stack effect in high-rise buildings.

For flue gas stacks or chimneys, where air is on the outside and combustion flue gases are on the inside, the equation will only provide an approximation. Also, A is the cross-sectional flow area and h is the height of the flue gas stack or chimney.

$$Q = C A \sqrt {2gh\frac{T_i - T_o}{T_i}}$$

SI units:

where:
Q	= stack effect draft (draught in British English) flow rate, m^{3}/s
A	= flow area, m^{2}
C	= discharge coefficient (usually taken to be from 0.65 to 0.70)
g	= gravitational acceleration, 9.81 m/s^{2}
h	= height or distance, m
T_{i}	= average inside temperature, K
T_{o}	= outside air temperature, K

U.S. customary units:

where:
Q	= stack effect draft flow rate, ft^{3}/s
A	= area, ft^{2}
C	= discharge coefficient (usually taken to be from 0.65 to 0.70)
g	= gravitational acceleration, 32.17 ft/s^{2}
h	= height or distance, ft
T_{i}	= average inside temperature, °R
T_{o}	= outside air temperature, °R

This equation assumes that the resistance to the draft flow is similar to the resistance of flow through an orifice characterized by a discharge coefficient C.

== See also ==
- Cross ventilation
- Draft (boiler)
- Ekibastuz GRES-2 Power Station
- HVAC (heating, ventilation and air conditioning)
- Inco Superstack
- Solar chimney
- Solar updraft tower
- Ventilation shaft
- Windcatcher
