= Cross ventilation =

Movement of air through a building

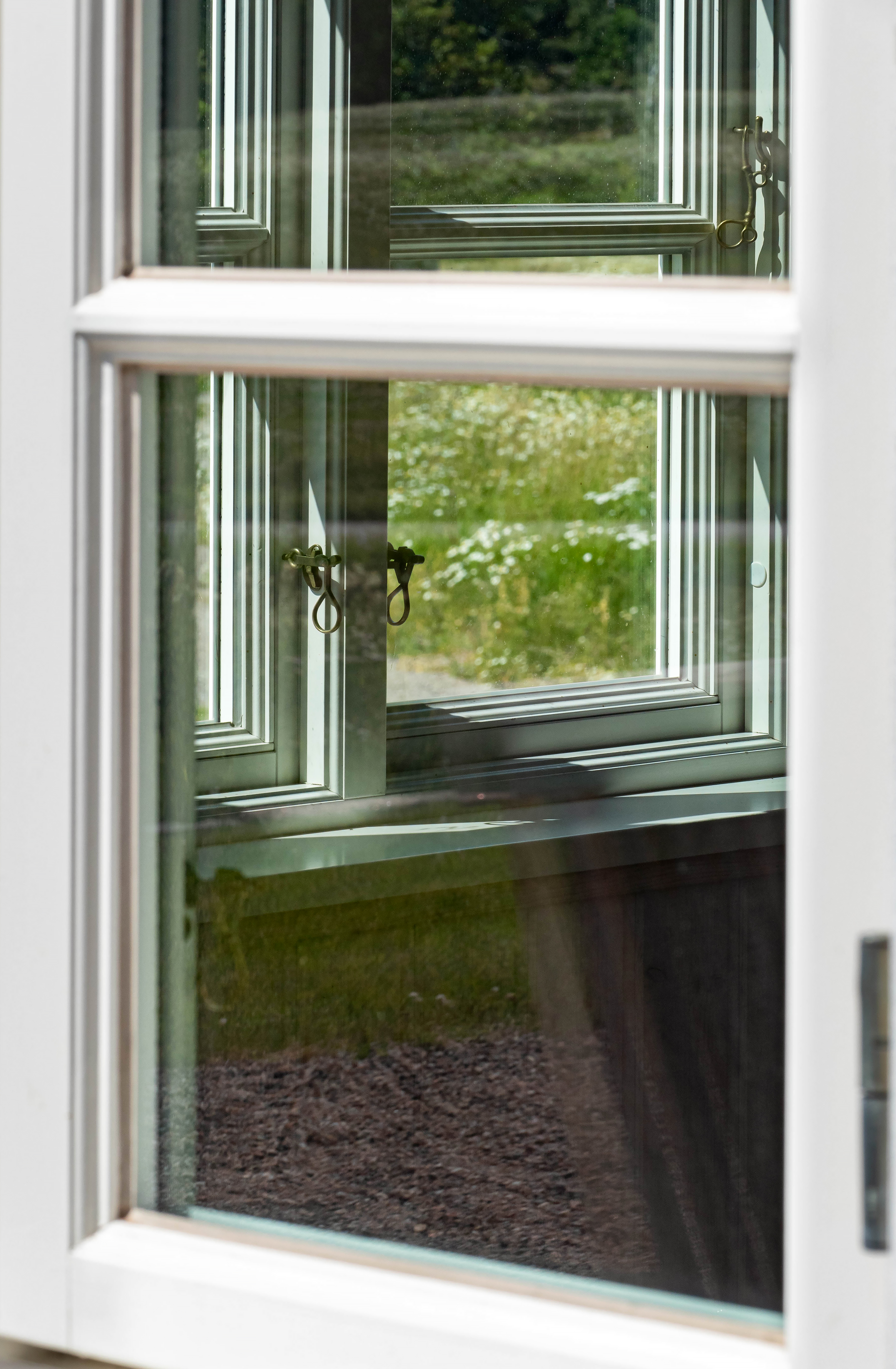
Cross-breezes work when two windows are opposite of each other.

Cross ventilation is a natural phenomenon where wind enters an opening, such as a window, flows directly through the space, and exits through an opening on the opposite side of the building (where the air pressure is lower). This produces a cool stream of air and a current across the room from the exposed area to the sheltered area.

Cross ventilation is powered by the wind and thus requires no energy input, in addition to being the most effective method of wind ventilation. A commonly used technique to remove pollutants and heat in an indoor environment, cross ventilation can also decrease or even obviate the need for air conditioning and can improve indoor air quality. Other terms used for the effect include cross-breeze, cross-draft, wind effect ventilation and cross-flow ventilation. In Germany they have been called lüften and Stoßlüften.

== Process ==
The phenomenon occurs when openings in an environment (including vehicles) or building (houses, factories, sheds, etc) are set on opposite or adjoining walls, which allow air to enter and exit, thus creating a current of air across the interior environment. Windows or vents positioned on opposite sides of the room allow passive breezes a pathway through the structure, which circulate the air and provide passive cooling.

There is also a pressure difference between the opposite sides of the establishment. The effect is mostly driven by the wind, whereby the air is pulled into the building on the high pressure windward part and is pushed out on the low pressure downwind side of the establishment (because of the pressure difference between the openings). A wind's effect on a structure creates regions that have positive pressure on the building's upwind area and a negative pressure on the downwind side. Thus, the building shape and local wind patterns are critical in making wind pressures that force airflow through its openings.

If the windows on both sides of the buildings are opened, the overpressure on the side facing the wind, and/or low pressure on the adjacent protected side, will make a current of air through the room from the uncovered side towards the sheltered side. If there are windows on both sides in a building, cross ventilation is appropriate where the width of the room is up to five times the floor-to-ceiling height. If openings are only one side then wind-driven ventilation is more suited for structures where the width is around 2.5 times the floor to ceiling height.

== Factors ==
Cross ventilation relies on many factors, such as the tightness of the establishment, wind direction and how much wind is available, its potential travel through chimneys, vents and other openings in the home. Casement windows can be installed to improve cross-breezes. Air quality may also affect cross ventilation.

Although cross ventilation is generally more direct at its job than stack ventilation, the cons include its effects being unproductive on hot, still days, when it is most necessary. Moreover, cross ventilation is generally only suitable for narrow buildings. The contrasting height of the openings (walls, sill, panels or furniture) ordered by the space also immediately influence the level and velocity of ventilation.

=== Effectiveness ===
Cross ventilation works well in climates with hotter temperatures, where the system allows continual changes of the air within the building, refreshing it and reducing the temperature inside the structure and also when the window on the windward side of the building is not opened as much as the one on the leeward side. Cross ventilation will not be efficacious if the windows are more than 12m apart and if a window is behind a door that is regularly shut.

An opened window that faces a prevailing wind and is conjugated with another window on the opposite side of a building will supply natural ventilation for fresh air. A decent and effective cross ventilation will remove heat from the interior and keep indoor air temperatures approximately 1.5 °C (2.7°F) below the outdoor air temperatures, ensuring that there is a steady inflow and outflow of fresh air inside the building.

Besides windows, other openings like brise soleils, doors, louvers or ventilation grills and ducts can also work as effective ventilation openings, though an awning window provides the least effectivity. The wind surrounding building structures is important when it comes to assessing the air quality and thermal comfort indoors since both air and heat exchange rely heavily on the wind pressure on the exterior of the building. For the best airflow, the windward windows of the occupied space should not be opened as much as those on the leeward side.

Disadvantages of wind-driven ventilation include capricious wind speeds and directions (which may create a strong unpleasant draft), and the polluted air from the outside that may tarnish the indoor air quality. Moreover, cross ventilation is not recommended for use in disease prevention when air is being moved by the cross ventilation from an unclean area into a clean area.

== Types ==
In a windcatcher, wind is forced down on the windward side and exits on the leeward side, using the stack effect.

There are four different types of cross ventilation:

- Single-sided ventilation: This method depends on the pressure contrasts between different openings within the occupied space. For rooms that only feature a single opening, the ventilation is impelled by turbulence, thereby creating a pumping activity on that lone opening, causing small inflows and outflows. Single-sided ventilation has a weak effect. It is preferable when cross ventilation is not achievable, where it uses windows or vents at the other side of the space to control air pressure.
- Cross ventilation (single spaces): Being unsophisticated and efficacious, this type of ventilation is a horizontal process that is driven by pressure differences between the windward and leeward sides of the occupied indoor environment. Ventilation here is generally provided using windows and vents at either side of a building where the variation in pressure draw air in and out.
- Cross ventilation (double-banked spaces): Involving banked rooms, this method features openings in the hallway structure. The openings allow a way for noise to move between spaces. It can provide a much higher air-exchange rate in comparison with single-sided ventilation.
- Stack ventilation: This ventilation is a vertical process and it's beneficiary for taller buildings with central atriums. It draws cooler air in at a lower level, whereby the air rises thereafter due to heat exposure before it is ventilated out at a higher level. Benefits from temperature compartmentalization and related pressure quality of the air, whereby warm air loses density when it rises and the cooler air supplants it.

== Equation ==
For a simple volume with two openings, the cross wind flow rate can be calculated using the following equation:

$Q = U_{\textrm{wind}}\sqrt{\frac{C_{\textrm{p1}}-C_{\textrm{p2}}}{1/\left(A_{\textrm{1}}^2C_{\textrm{1}}^2\right)+1/\left(A_{\textrm{2}}^2C_{\textrm{2}}^2\right)}}\qquad{}\left(1\right)$

where $U_{\textrm{wind}}$ is the far-field wind speed; $C_{\textrm{p1}}$ is a local pressure drag coefficient for the building, defined at the location of the upstream opening; $C_{\textrm{p2}}$ is a local pressure drag coefficient for the building, defined at the location of the downstream opening; $A_{\textrm{1}}$ is the cross-sectional area of the upstream opening; $A_{\textrm{2}}$ is the cross-sectional area of the downstream opening; $C_{\textrm{1}}$ is the discharge coefficient of the upstream opening; and $C_{\textrm{2}}$ is the discharge coefficient of the downstream opening.

For rooms with single opening, the calculation of ventilation rate is more complicated than cross ventilation due to the bi-directional flow and strong turbulent effect. The ventilation rate for single-sided ventilation can be accurately predicted by combining different models for mean flow, pulsating flow and eddy penetration. The mean flow rate for single-sided ventilation is determined by:

$\bar{Q} = \frac{C_{d}\; l\; \sqrt {Cp}\;\int\limits_{z_{0}}^h \sqrt{-\frac{2\;\Delta\;P(z)}{\rho}}\, \mathrm{d}z}{z_{ref}^ {1/7}} \; \bar{U}$

where

l = width of the window;

h = elevation of the top edge of the window;

z_{0} = elevation of neural level (where inside and outside pressure balance);

z_{ref} = reference elevation where the wind velocity is measured (at 10 m) and

$\bar{U}$ = mean wind velocity at the reference elevation.

As observed in the equation (1), the air exchange depends linearly on the wind speed in the urban place where the architectural project will be built. CFD (Computational Fluid Dynamics) tools and zonal modelings are usually used to design naturally ventilated buildings. Windcatchers can assist wind-driven ventilation by guiding air in and out of structures.

== See also ==
- Windcatcher
- Passive cooling
- Passive ventilation
- Room air distribution
- Thermal comfort
