= Displacement ventilation =

Room air distribution strategy

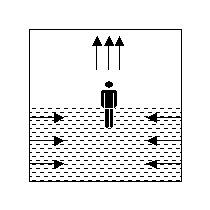
Diagram of displacement ventilation

Displacement ventilation (DV) is a room air distribution strategy where conditioned outdoor air is supplied at a low velocity from air supply diffusers located near floor level and extracted above the occupied zone, usually at ceiling height.

== System design ==
A typical displacement ventilation system, such as one in an office space, supplies conditioned cold air from an air handling unit (AHU) through a low induction air diffuser. Diffuser types vary by applications. Diffusers can be located against a wall ("wall-mounted"), at the corner of a room ("corner-mounted"), or above the floor but not against a wall ("free-standing"). The cool air accelerates because of the buoyancy force, spreads in a thin layer over the floor, reaching a relatively high velocity before rising due to heat exchange with heat sources (e.g., occupants, computers, lights). Absorbing the heat from heat sources, the cold air becomes warmer and less dense. The density difference between cold air and warm air creates upward convective flows known as thermal plumes. Instead of working as a stand-alone system in interior space, displacement ventilation system can also be coupled with other cooling and heating sources, such as radiant chilled ceilings or baseboard heating.

== History ==
Displacement ventilation was first applied in an industrial building in Scandinavia in 1978, and has frequently been used in similar applications, as well as office spaces, throughout Scandinavia since that time. By 1989, it was estimated that displacement ventilation comprised the 50% in industrial applications and 25% in offices within Nordic countries. Applications in the United States have not been as widespread as in Scandinavia. Some research has been done to assess the practicality of this application in U.S. markets due to different typical space designs and application in hot and humid climates, as well as research to assess the potential indoor environmental quality and energy-saving benefits of this strategy in the U.S. and elsewhere.

== Applications ==
Displacement ventilation has been applied in many famous building such as the Suvarnabhumi International Airport in Bangkok, Thailand, the NASA Jet Propulsion Laboratory Flight Projects Center building, and the San Francisco International Airport Terminal 2 among other applications.

== General characteristics ==
=== Airflow distribution ===
The thermal plumes and supply air from diffusers, which determines the velocity of airflow at floor level, play an important role in DV systems. It is necessary to carefully set the airflow rate from the diffuser to avoid drafts.

=== Conditioning type ===
Due to the unique properties of thermal stratification, displacement ventilation is typically used for cooling rather than for heating. In many cases, a separate heating source, such as a radiator or baseboard, is used during heating periods.

=== Space requirement ===
Displacement ventilation is best suited for taller spaces (higher than 3 meters [10 feet]). Standard mixing ventilation may be better suited for smaller spaces where air quality is not as great a concern, such as single-occupant offices, and where the room height is not tall (e.g., lower than 2.3 meters [7.5 feet]).

== Benefits and limitations ==
=== Local discomfort: vertical temperature difference and draft ===
Displacement ventilation systems are quieter than conventional overhead systems with better ventilation efficiency. Hence, it could enhance indoor air quality and provide desirable acoustic environment. Displacement ventilation systems are appropriate in space where high ventilation is required, such as classrooms, conference rooms, and offices.

Displacement ventilation can be a cause of discomfort due to the large vertical temperature gradient and drafts. According to Melikov and Pitchurov's research, sensations of cold caused by vertical temperature difference and draft are usually occurred at the lower leg/ ankle/ feet region, while warm sensations at the head are reported. The research also indicates, that the draft rating model could predict the draft risk with good accuracy in rooms with displacement ventilation systems.

There is a tradeoff inherent in these two issues: by increasing the flow rate (and the ability to remove greater thermal loads), the vertical temperature gradient can be reduced, but this could increase the risk of drafts. Pairing displacement ventilation with radiant chilled ceilings is an effort to mitigate this problem. According to some studies, displacement ventilation systems can only provide acceptable comfort if the corresponding cooling load is less than about 13 Btu/h-sf or 40 W/m^{2}.

=== Indoor air quality ===
One benefit of displacement ventilation is possibly the superior indoor air quality achieved with exhausting contaminated air out of the room. Better air quality is achieved when the pollution source is also a heat source.

The effectiveness of displacement ventilation at removing particulate contaminants has been investigated recently. Small aqueous droplets containing infectious nuclei are frequently released in hospital rooms and other indoor spaces, and tend to settle through the ambient air at a speed of order 1–10 mm/s typically. In cold climates or seasons, sufficiently small droplets are extracted from the top of a displacement-ventilated space if the mean upward air speed exceeds the particle settling speed. However, laboratory experiments have shown that larger droplets may settle faster than the air moves. In this case, the large droplets are not extracted effectively from a space with upward displacement ventilation, and their concentration increases if the ventilation rate is increased. In warmer climates or seasons, large-scale instabilities in the concentration of contaminants may occur within a space with downward displacement ventilation.

=== Energy consumption ===
Some studies have demonstrated that displacement ventilation may save energy as compared to standard mixing ventilation, depending on the use type of the building, design/massing/orientation, and other factors. However, for the evaluation of energy consumption of displacement ventilation, the numerical simulation is the main method, since yearly measurements are too expensive and time consuming. Hence, whether displacement ventilation could help with saving energy is still debated. In general, displacement ventilation is attractive to the core region in a building since no heating is needed. However, the perimeter zones require high cooling energy.

== Design guidelines ==
Different guidelines have been published to provide guidance on designing displacement ventilation systems, including:

- Skistad H., Mundt E., Nielsen P.V., Hagstrom K., Railo J. (2002). Displacement ventilation in Non-Industrial Premises. Federation of European Heating and Air-conditioning Associations.
- Skistad, H. (1994). Displacement ventilation. Research Studies Press, John Wiley & Sons, Ltd., west Sussex. UK.
- Chen, Q. and Glicksman, L. (2003). Performance Evaluation and Development of Design Guidelines for Displacement ventilation. Atlanta: ASHRAE.

Among guidelines listed above, the one developed by Chen and Glicksman are aimed specifically at fulfilling U.S. Standard. Below is a brief description of each step of their guideline.

Step 1) Judge the applicability of displacement ventilation

Step 2) Calculate summer design cooling load.

Step 3) Determine the required flow rate of the supply air for summer cooling.

Step 4) Find the required flow rate of fresh air for acceptable indoor air quality.

Step 5) Determine the supply air flow rate.

Step 6) Calculate the supply airflow rate.

Step 7) Determine the ratio of the fresh air to the supply air.

Step 8) Select supply air diffuser size and number.

Step 9) Check the winter heating situation.

Step 10) Estimate the first costs and annual energy consumption.

== List of buildings using displacement ventilation ==
Building	Year	Country	City	Architects	Space Type
Jewish Museum Berlin	1999	Germany	Berlin	Daniel Libeskind	Exhibit space
Bangkok International Airport	2006	Thailand	Bangkok	Helmut Jahn of Murphy / Jahn Architects	Airport terminal
Hearst Tower	2006	United States	New York City, NY	Norman Foster of Foster + Partners	Large public space
Newseum	2011	United States	Washington, D.C.	Polshek Partnership	Large public space
Modesto Medical Center	2008	United States	Modesto, California	KP Architects	Health-care
St. John's University, St. John's Hall	1950s	United States	New York City, NY	unknown	Teaching environment
Carnegie Hall	1891	United States	New York City, NY	William Burnet Tuthill	Theater
Samuel J. Friedman Theater	1920s	United States	New York City, NY	Herbert J. Krapp	Theater
National Center for the Performing Arts	2007	China	Beijing	Paul Andreu	Theater
The Copenhagen Opera	2004	Denmark	Copenhagen	Henning Larsen	Theater
Prince Mahidol Hall	2014	Thailand	Nakornpathom	A49	Theater
Sky Central	2014	United Kingdom	London	PLP & Arup	Office

== See also ==
- Underfloor air distribution (UFAD)
