= Air current =

Concentrated areas of wind due to atmospheric pressure or temperature gradients

In meteorology, air currents are concentrated areas of winds. They are mainly due to differences in atmospheric pressure or temperature. They are divided into horizontal and vertical currents; both are present at mesoscale while horizontal ones dominate at synoptic scale. Air currents are not only found in the troposphere, but extend to the stratosphere and mesosphere.

== Horizontal currents ==
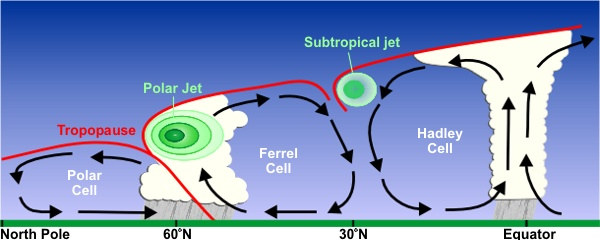
Jet streams depiction.

A difference in air pressure causes an air displacement and generates the wind. The Coriolis force deflects the air movement to the right in the northern hemisphere and the left in the southern one, which makes the winds parallel to the isobars on an elevation in pressure card. It is also referred as the geostrophic wind.

Pressure differences depend, in turn, on the average temperature in the air column. As the sun does not heat the Earth evenly, there is a temperature difference between the poles and the equator, creating air masses with more or less homogeneous temperature with latitude. Differences in atmospheric pressure are also at the origin of the general atmospheric circulation while the air masses are separated by ribbons where temperature changes rapidly. These are the fronts. Along these areas, higher winds aloft form. These horizontal jets (jet streams) can reach speeds of several hundred kilometers per hour and can span thousands of kilometers in length, but are narrow, having tens or hundreds of kilometers of width.

On the surface, the friction due to the terrain and other obstacles (buildings, trees, etc.) may contribute to a slowdown and/or a wind deflection. Thus, a more turbulent wind in the atmospheric boundary layer. This wind can be channeled through narrows, like valleys. The wind will also be raised along the slopes of the mountains to give local air currents.

== Vertical currents ==
=== Mechanically induced ===
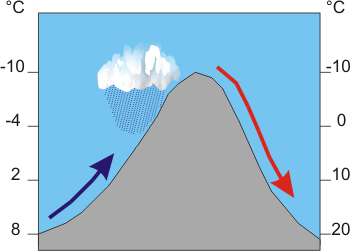
Foehn wind diagram.

The coriolis effect is when winds move from east to west the from north to south this is one of the main reasons for wind speeds and hurricanes.

Vertical movements occur when there is convergence and divergence at different levels of the atmosphere. For example, near the jet stream, winds increase when approaching its most intense region and decreases when it moves away. Thus, there are areas where the air accumulates and must come down, while in other areas there is a loss and an updraft from lower layers. These upward or downward flows will be relatively diffused.

On the other hand, barriers such as mountains force air up or down, sometimes rapidly. As the barriers are very localized, these currents will affect very limited areas and therefore will form corridors.

=== Thermically induced ===
Ascending glider in a thermal.

Thermals are caused by local differences in temperature, pressure, or impurity concentration in the vertical. Temperature differences can cause air currents because warmer air is less dense than cooler air, causing the warmer air to appear "lighter." Thus, if the warm air is under the cool air, air currents will form as they exchange places. Air currents are caused because of the uneven heating of Earth's surface.

== See also ==
- Air flow
