= Passive ventilation =

Ventilation without use of mechanical systems

The ventilation system of a regular earthship

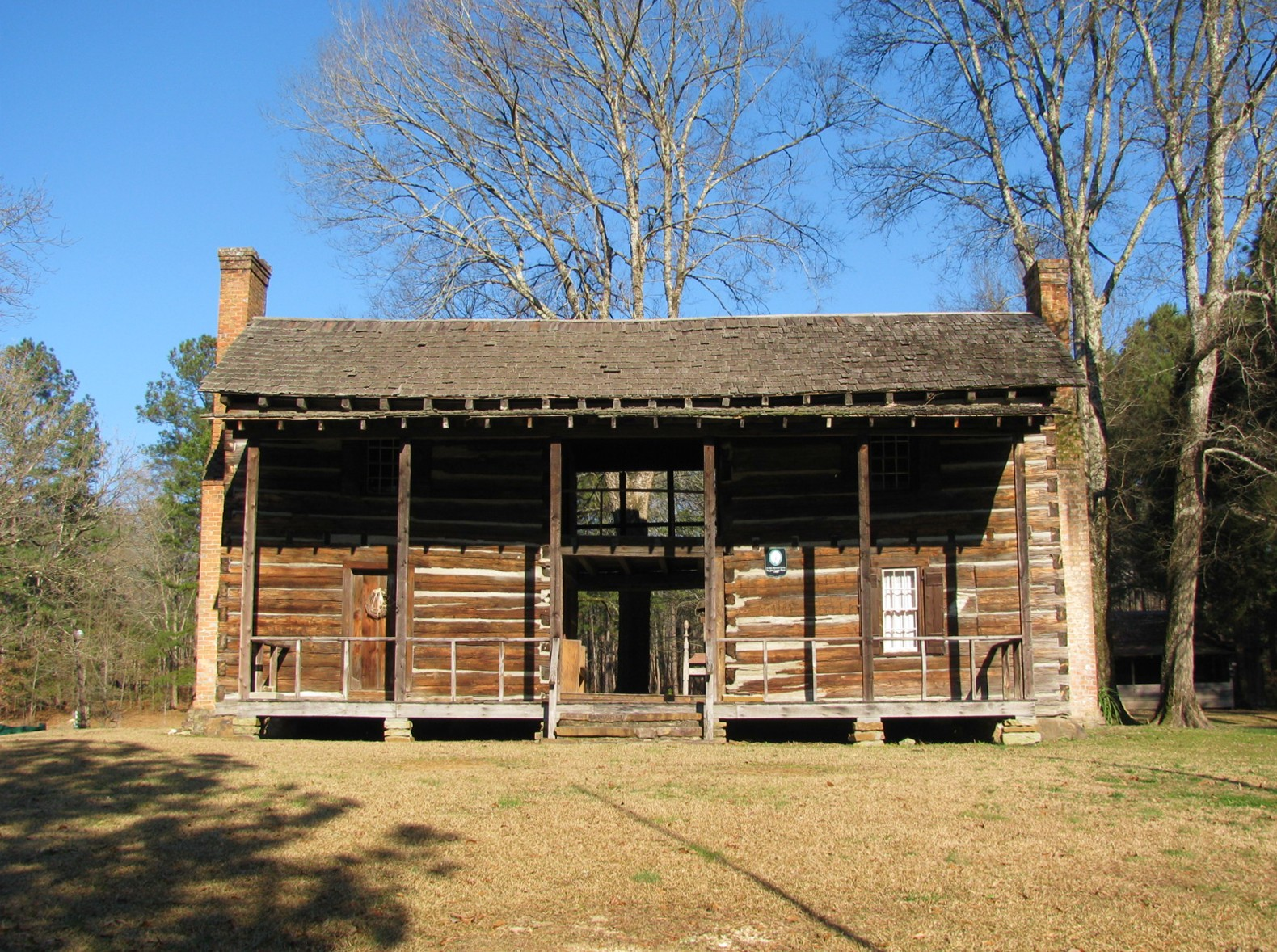
Dogtrot houses are designed to maximize natural ventilation.

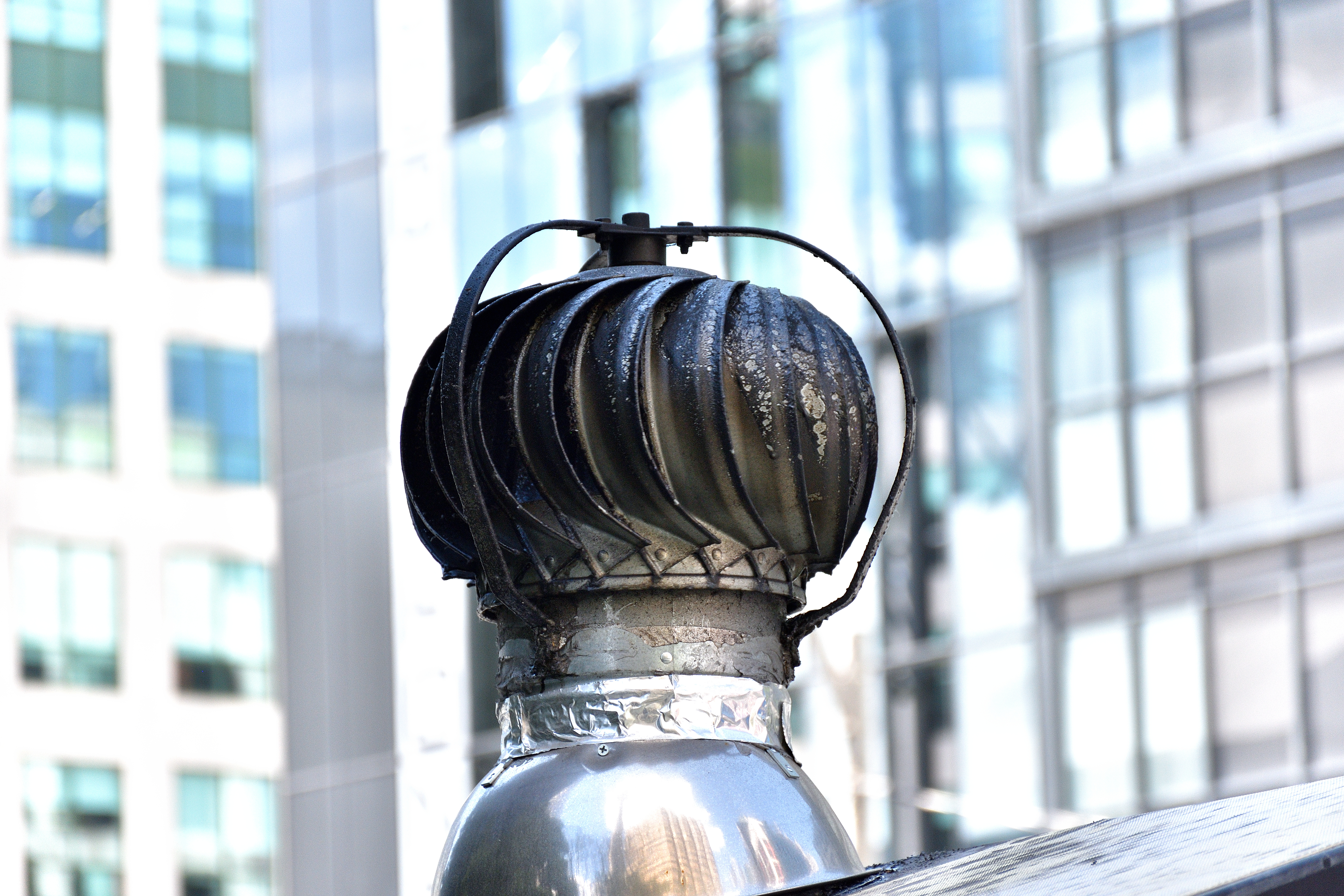
A roof turbine ventilator, colloquially known as a 'Whirly Bird', is an application of wind driven ventilation.

Passive ventilation is the process of supplying air to and removing air from an indoor space without using mechanical systems. It refers to the flow of external air to an indoor space as a result of pressure differences arising from natural forces.

There are two types of natural ventilation occurring in buildings: wind driven ventilation and buoyancy-driven ventilation. Wind driven ventilation arises from the different pressures created by wind around a building or structure, and openings being formed on the perimeter which then permit flow through the building. Buoyancy-driven ventilation occurs as a result of the directional buoyancy force that results from temperature differences between the interior and exterior.

Since the internal heat gains which create temperature differences between the interior and exterior are created by natural processes, including the heat from people, and wind effects are variable, naturally ventilated buildings are sometimes called "breathing buildings".

== Process ==
The static pressure of air is the pressure in a free-flowing air stream and is depicted by isobars in weather maps. Differences in static pressure arise from global and microclimate thermal phenomena and create the air flow we call wind. Dynamic pressure is the pressure exerted when the wind comes into contact with an object such as a hill or a building and it is described by the following equation:

$$q = \tfrac12\, \rho\, v^{2},$$

where (using SI units):

$q\;$	= dynamic pressure in pascals,
$\rho\;$	= fluid density in kg/m^{3} (e.g. density of air),
$v\;$	= fluid velocity in m/s.

The impact of wind on a building affects the ventilation and infiltration rates through it and the associated heat losses or heat gains. Wind speed increases with height and is lower towards the ground due to frictional drag. In practical terms wind pressure will vary considerably creating complex air flows and turbulence by its interaction with elements of the natural environment (trees, hills) and urban context (buildings, structures). Vernacular and traditional buildings in different climatic regions rely heavily upon natural ventilation for maintaining thermal comfort conditions in the enclosed spaces.

== Design ==
Design guidelines are offered in building regulations and other related literature and include a variety of recommendations on many specific areas such as:

- Building location and orientation
- Building form and dimensions
- Indoor partitions and layout
- Window typologies, operation, location, and shapes
- Other aperture types (doors, chimneys)
- Construction methods and detailing (infiltration)
- External elements (walls, screens)
- Urban planning conditions

The following design guidelines are selected from the Whole Building Design Guide, a program of the National Institute of Building Sciences:

- Maximize wind-induced ventilation by siting the ridge of a building perpendicular to the summer winds
- Widths of naturally ventilated zone should be narrow (max 13.7 m [45 feet])
- Each room should have two separate supply and exhaust openings. Locate exhaust high above inlet to maximize stack effect. Orient windows across the room and offset from each other to maximize mixing within the room while minimizing the obstructions to airflow within the room.
- Window openings should be operable by the occupants
- Consider the use of clerestories or vented skylights.

== Wind driven ventilation ==
Wind driven ventilation can be classified as cross ventilation and single-sided ventilation. Wind driven ventilation depends on wind behavior, on the interactions with the building envelope and on openings or other air exchange devices such as inlets or windcatchers.

The knowledge of the urban climatology i.e. the wind around the buildings is crucial when evaluating the air quality and thermal comfort inside buildings as air and heat exchange depends on the wind pressure on facades. As observed in the equation (1), the air exchange depends linearly on the wind speed in the urban place where the architectural project will be built. CFD (Computational Fluid Dynamics) tools and zonal modelings are usually used to design naturally ventilated buildings. Windcatchers are able to aid wind driven ventilation by directing air in and out of buildings.

== Buoyancy-driven ventilation ==
Buoyancy driven ventilation arise due to differences in density of interior and exterior air, which in large part arises from differences in temperature. When there is a temperature difference between two adjoining volumes of air the warmer air will have lower density and be more buoyant thus will rise above the cold air creating an upward air stream. Forced upflow buoyancy driven ventilation in a building takes place in a traditional fireplace. Passive stack ventilators are common in most bathrooms and other type of spaces without direct access to the outdoors.

In order for a building to be ventilated adequately via buoyancy driven ventilation, the inside and outside temperatures must be different. When the interior is warmer than the exterior, indoor air rises and escapes the building at higher apertures. If there are lower apertures then colder, denser air from the exterior enters the building through them, thereby creating upflow displacement ventilation. However, if there are no lower apertures present, then both in- and out-flow will occur through the high level opening. This is called mixing ventilation. This latter strategy still results in fresh air reaching to low level, since although the incoming cold air will mix with the interior air, it will always be more dense than the bulk interior air and hence fall to the floor. Buoyancy-driven ventilation increases with greater temperature difference, and increased height between the higher and lower apertures in the case of displacement ventilation. When both high and low level openings are present, the neutral plane in a building occurs at the location between the high and low openings at which the internal pressure will be the same as the external pressure (in the absence of wind). Above the neutral plane, the internal air pressure will be positive and air will flow out of any intermediate level apertures created. Below the neutral plane the internal air pressure will be negative and external air will be drawn into the space through any intermediate level apertures. Buoyancy-driven ventilation has several significant benefits: {See Linden, P Annu Rev Fluid Mech, 1999}

- Does not rely on wind: can take place on still, hot summer days when it is most needed.
- Stable air flow (compared to wind)
- Greater control in choosing areas of air intake
- Sustainable method

Limitations of buoyancy-driven ventilation:

- Lower magnitude compared to wind ventilation on the windiest days
- Relies on temperature differences (inside/outside)
- Design restrictions (height, location of apertures) and may incur extra costs (ventilator stacks, taller spaces)
- The quality of air it introduces in buildings may be polluted for example due to proximity to an urban or industrial area (although this can also be a factor in wind-driven ventilation)

Natural ventilation in buildings can rely mostly on wind pressure differences in windy conditions, but buoyancy effects can a) augment this type of ventilation and b) ensure air flow rates during still days. Buoyancy-driven ventilation can be implemented in ways that air inflow in the building does not rely solely on wind direction. In this respect, it may provide improved air quality in some types of polluted environments such as cities. For example, air can be drawn through the backside or courtyards of buildings avoiding the direct pollution and noise of the street facade. Wind can augment the buoyancy effect, but can also reduce its effect depending on its speed, direction and the design of air inlets and outlets. Therefore, prevailing winds must be taken into account when designing for stack effect ventilation.

== Estimating buoyancy-driven ventilation ==
The natural ventilation flow rate for buoyancy-driven natural ventilation with vents at two different heights can be estimated with this equation:

$$Q_{S} = C_{d}\; A\; \sqrt {2\;g\;H_{d}\;\frac{T_I-T_O}{T_I}}$$

English units:

where:
Q_{S}	= Buoyancy-driven ventilation airflow rate, ft^{3}/s
A	= cross-sectional area of opening, ft² (assumes equal area for inlet and outlet)
C_{d}	= Discharge coefficient for opening (typical value is 0.65)
g	= gravitational acceleration, around 32.2 ft/s² on Earth
H_{d}	= Height from midpoint of lower opening to midpoint of upper opening, ft
T_{I}	= Average indoor temperature between the inlet and outlet, °R
T_{O}	= Outdoor temperature, °R

SI units:

where:
Q_{S}	= Buoyancy-driven ventilation airflow rate, m^{3}/s
A	= cross-sectional area of opening, m^{2} (assumes equal area for inlet and outlet)
C_{d}	= Discharge coefficient for opening (typical value is 0,62)
g	= gravitational acceleration, around 9.81 m/s² on Earth
H_{d}	= Height from midpoint of lower opening to midpoint of upper opening, m
T_{I}	= Average indoor temperature between the inlet and outlet, K
T_{O}	= Outdoor temperature, K

== Assessing performance ==
One way to measure the performance of a naturally ventilated space is to measure the air changes per hour in an interior space. In order for ventilation to be effective, there must be exchange between outdoor air and room air. A common method for measuring ventilation effectiveness is to use a tracer gas. The first step is to close all windows, doors, and openings in the space. Then a tracer gas is added to the air. The reference, American Society for Testing and Materials (ASTM) Standard E741: Standard Test Method for Determining Air Change in a Single Zone by Means of a Tracer Gas Dilution, describes which tracer gases can be used for this kind of testing and provides information about the chemical properties, health impacts, and ease of detection. Once the tracer gas has been added, mixing fans can be used to distribute the tracer gas as uniformly as possible throughout the space. To do a decay test, the concentration of the tracer gas is first measured when the concentration of the tracer gas is constant. Windows and doors are then opened and the concentration of the tracer gas in the space is measured at regular time intervals to determine the decay rate of the tracer gas. The airflow can be deduced by looking at the change in concentration of the tracer gas over time. For further details on this test method, refer to ASTM Standard E741.

While natural ventilation eliminates electrical energy consumed by fans, overall energy consumption of natural ventilation systems is often higher than that of modern mechanical ventilation systems featuring heat recovery. Typical modern mechanical ventilation systems use as little as 2000 J/m^{3} for fan operation, and in cold weather they can recover much more energy than this in the form of heat transferred from waste exhaust air to fresh supply air using recuperators.

Ventilation heat loss can be calculated as:

$\theta=C_p \cdot \rho \cdot \Delta T \cdot (1-\eta).$

Where:

- $\theta$ is ventilation heat loss in W
- $C_p$ is specific heat capacity of air (~1000 J/(kg*K))
- $\rho$ is air density (~1.2 kg/m^{3})
- $\Delta T$ is the temperature difference between inside and outside air in K or °C
- $\eta$ is the heat recovery efficiency - (typically around 0.8 with heat recovery and 0 if no heat recovery device is used).

The temperature differential needed between indoor and outdoor air for mechanical ventilation with heat recovery to outperform natural ventilation in terms of overall energy efficiency can therefore be calculated as:

$\Delta T = \frac{SFP}{C_p \cdot \rho \cdot (1-\eta)}$

Where:

SFP is specific fan power in Pa, J/m^{3}, or W/(m^{3}/s)

Under typical comfort ventilation conditions with a heat recovery efficiency of 80% and a SFP of 2000 J/m^{3} we get:

$\Delta T = 2000/(1000*1.2*(1-0.8))=8.33 [K]$

In climates where the mean absolute difference between inside and outside temperatures exceeds ~10K the energy conservation argument for choosing natural over mechanical ventilation might therefore be questioned. It should however be noted that heating energy might be cheaper and more environmentally friendly than electricity. This is especially the case in areas where district heating is available.

To develop natural ventilation systems with heat recovery two inherent challenges must first be solved:

1. Providing efficient heat recovery at very low driving pressures.
2. Physically or thermally connecting supply and exhaust air streams. (Stack ventilation typically relies on supply and exhaust being placed low and high respectively, while wind driven natural ventilation normally relies on openings being placed on opposing sides of a building for efficient cross ventilation.)

Research aiming at the development of natural ventilation systems featuring heat recovery have been made as early as 1993 where Shultz et al. proposed and tested a chimney type design relying on stack effect while recovering heat using a large counterflow recuperator constructed from corrugated galvanized iron. Both supply and exhaust happened through an unconditioned attic space, with exhaust air being extracted at ceiling height and air being supplied at floor level through a vertical duct.

The device was found to provide sufficient ventilation air flow for a single family home and heat recovery with an efficiency around 40%. The device was however found to be too large and heavy to be practical, and the heat recovery efficiency too low to be competitive with mechanical systems of the time.

Later attempts have primarily focused on wind as the main driving force due to its higher pressure potential. This however introduces an issue of there being large fluctuations in driving pressure.

With the use of wind towers placed on the roof of ventilated spaces, supply and exhaust can be placed close to each other on opposing sides of the small towers. These systems often feature finned heat pipes although this limits the theoretical maximum heat recovery efficiency.

Liquid coupled run around loops have also been tested to achieve indirect thermal connection between exhaust and supply air. While these tests have been somewhat successful, liquid coupling introduces mechanical pumps that consume energy to circulate the working fluid.

While some commercially available solutions have been available for years, the claimed performance by manufacturers has yet to be verified by independent scientific studies. This might explain the apparent lack of market impact of these commercially available products claiming to deliver natural ventilation and high heat recovery efficiencies.

A radically new approach to natural ventilation with heat recovery is currently being developed at Aarhus University, where heat exchange tubes are integrated into structural concrete slabs between building floors.

== Standards ==
For standards relating to ventilation rates, in the United States refer to ASHRAE Standard 62.1-2010: Ventilation for Acceptable Indoor Air Quality. These requirements are for "all spaces intended for human occupancy except those within single-family houses, multifamily structures of three stories or fewer above grade, vehicles, and aircraft." In the revision to the standard in 2010, Section 6.4 was modified to specify that most buildings designed to have systems to naturally condition spaces must also "include a mechanical ventilation system designed to meet the Ventilation Rate or IAQ procedures [in ASHRAE 62.1-2010]. The mechanical system is to be used when windows are closed due to extreme outdoor temperatures noise and security concerns". The standard states that two exceptions in which naturally conditioned buildings do not require mechanical systems are when:

- Natural ventilation openings that comply with the requirements of Section 6.4 are permanently open or have controls that prevent the openings from being closed during period of expected occupancy, or
- The zone is not served by heating or cooling equipment.

Also, an authority having jurisdiction may allow for the design of conditioning system that does not have a mechanical system but relies only on natural systems. In reference for how controls of conditioning systems should be designed, the standard states that they must take into consideration measures to "properly coordinate operation of the natural and mechanical ventilation systems."

Another reference is ASHRAE Standard 62.2-2010: Ventilation and Acceptable Indoor Air Quality in low-rise Residential Buildings. These requirements are for "single-family houses and multifamily structures of three stories or fewer above grade, including manufactured and modular houses," but is not applicable "to transient housing such as hotels, motels, nursing homes, dormitories, or jails."

For standards relating to ventilation rates, in the United States refer to ASHRAE Standard 55-2010: Thermal Environmental Conditions for Human Occupancy. Throughout its revisions, its scope has been consistent with its currently articulated purpose, “to specify the combinations of indoor thermal environmental factors and personal factors that will produce thermal environmental conditions acceptable to a majority of the occupants within the space.” The standard was revised in 2004 after field study results from the ASHRAE research project, RP-884: developing an adaptive model of thermal comfort and preference, indicated that there are differences between naturally and mechanically conditioned spaces with regards to occupant thermal response, change in clothing, availability of control, and shifts in occupant expectations. The addition to the standard, 5.3: Optional Method For Determining Acceptable Thermal Conditions in Naturally Ventilated Spaces, uses an adaptive thermal comfort approach for naturally conditioned buildings by specifying acceptable operative temperature ranges for naturally conditioned spaces. As a result, the design of natural ventilation systems became more feasible, which was acknowledged by ASHRAE as a way to further sustainable, energy efficient, and occupant-friendly design.

== See also ==
- Ventilation (architecture)
- Infiltration (HVAC)
- Air-side economizers
- Solar chimney
- Windcatcher
- Indoor air quality
- Sick building syndrome
- Heating, Ventilation and Air-Conditioning
- Mechanical engineering
- Architectural engineering
- Green building
- Passive cooling
- Mixed Mode Ventilation
- Room air distribution
- Thermal comfort
- Air conditioning
- ASHRAE
- Glossary of HVAC
