= (acyl-carrier-protein) phosphodiesterase =

Enzyme

[acyl-carrier-protein] phosphodiesterase

Identifiers
- EC no.: 3.1.4.14
- CAS no.: 37288-21-4

Databases
- BRENDA: enzyme data
- ExPASy: NiceZyme view
- KEGG: enzyme entry
- MetaCyc: metabolic pathway
- Rhea: reactions
- PDB structures: RCSB PDB PDBe PDBsum
- Gene Ontology: AmiGO / QuickGO
Search
- PMC: articles
- PubMed: articles
- NCBI: proteins

The enzyme [acyl-carrier-protein] phosphodiesterase (EC 3.1.4.14) catalyzes the reaction

holo-[acyl-carrier-protein] + H_{2}O $\rightleftharpoons$ 4′-phosphopantetheine + apo-[acyl-carrier-protein]

This enzyme belongs to the family of hydrolases, specifically those acting on phosphoric diester bonds. The systematic name is holo-[acyl-carrier-protein] 4′-pantetheine-phosphohydrolase. Other names in common use include ACP hydrolyase, ACP phosphodiesterase, AcpH, and [acyl-carrier-protein] 4′-pantetheine-phosphohydrolase. This enzyme participates in pantothenate and CoA biosynthesis.

ACP hydrolyase and ACP hydrolyase homologues are related to the hydrolyase domain of the bacterial protein SpoT. AcpH hydrolyzes the link between acyl carrier protein's serine-36 side chain and 4'-phosphopanthetheine.

== Structural studies ==
As of late 2007, two structures have been solved for this class of enzymes, with PDB accession codes PDB: 1T5B and PDB: 1TIK.
