= Infiltration (HVAC) =

Leakage of outside air into a building

Infiltration is the unintentional or accidental introduction of outside air into a building, typically through cracks in the building envelope and through use of doors for passage. Infiltration is sometimes called air leakage. The leakage of room air out of a building, intentionally or not, is called exfiltration. Infiltration is caused by wind, negative pressurization of the building, and by air buoyancy forces known commonly as the stack effect.

== Infiltration measures ==
The infiltration rate is the volumetric flow rate of outside air into a building, typically in cubic feet per minute (CFM) or liters per second (LPS). The air exchange rate (I), is the number of interior volume air changes that occur per hour, and has units of 1/h. The air exchange rate is also known as air changes per hour (ACH).

ACH is the hourly ventilation rate, divided by the building volume. It can be calculated by multiplying the building's CFM by 60, and then dividing by the building volume. (CFM x 60)/volume

Infiltration in finished structures can often be measured directly by using tracer-gas leak testing.

== Infiltration as ventilation air ==
In many smaller buildings, 'forced' or 'mechanical' ventilation is not used to introduce ventilation air. Instead, natural ventilation, via openable windows and other openings, exhaust fans, and infiltration are used to provide ventilation air. Typically, at least one-third air change per hour is considered the minimum. ASHRAE Standard 62.2 was adopted in 2004; it clarifies the ventilation air requirements for low-rise residences. The Standard specifies that forced ventilation is required in houses with infiltration less than 0.35 ACH. This is typically accomplished with heat recovery ventilation or exhaust fans running constantly or periodically.

== Controlling infiltration ==
Because infiltration is uncontrolled, and admits unconditioned air, it is generally considered undesirable except for ventilation air purposes. Typically, infiltration is minimized to reduce dust, to increase thermal comfort, and to decrease energy consumption. For all buildings, infiltration can be reduced via sealing cracks in a building's envelope, and for new construction or major renovations, by installing continuous air retarders. In buildings where forced ventilation is provided, their HVAC designers typically choose to slightly pressurize the buildings by admitting more outside air than exhausting so that infiltration is dramatically reduced.

== Energy saving ==
In typical modern U.S. residences, about one-third of the HVAC energy consumption is due to infiltration. Another third is to ground-contact, and the remainder is to heat losses and gains through windows, walls, and other thermal loads. As such, reducing infiltration can yield significant energy savings, with rapid payback. In cold climates, with a 15 MPH wind, residences often have air exchange rates of 1.0 to 1.5 ACHs, far in excess of the ventilation air needs and are thus called loose construction. It is very easy to reduce infiltration rates to less than 1.0 ACH. Smoke candles and blower-door tests can help identify less-than-obvious leaks. The Weatherization article describes methods for energy savings further. If infiltration is reduced below 0.35 ACH, it is recommended that mechanical ventilation (typically an exhaust fan or heat recovery ventilation) be implemented.

== See also ==
- Vapor barrier
- Ventilation (architecture)
- Natural ventilation
- Indoor air quality
- Thermal comfort
- Sick building syndrome
- Heating, Ventilation and Air-Conditioning
- Psychrometrics
- Mechanical engineering
- Architectural engineering
- Green building
