= Air changes per hour =

Measure of the air volume added to or removed from a space

Air changes per hour, abbreviated ACPH or ACH, or air change rate is the ratio of the volumetric airflow rate to the space volume. It is expressed as the number of air changes per hour. Its definition doesn't imply that the entire initial air volume is physically replaced at each nominal air change.

If the air in the space is either uniform or perfectly mixed, air changes per hour is a measure of how many times the air within a defined space is replaced each hour. Perfectly mixed air refers to a theoretical condition where supply air is instantly and uniformly mixed with the air already present in a space, so that conditions such as age of air and concentration of pollutants are spatially uniform.

In many air distribution arrangements, air is neither uniform nor perfectly mixed. The actual percentage of an enclosure's air which is exchanged in a period depends on the airflow efficiency of the enclosure and the methods used to ventilate it. These systems range from a conceptual system of perfect displacement, which removes and replaces all air in a space, to a short circuit flow in which very little of the existing air is replaced. Concretely, in a perfectly mixed space with a constant ventilation rate, pollutant-free incoming air, no additional pollutant sources and no other removal mechanisms, the concentration of an initially present airborne pollutant decreases exponentially.

The relation between the concentration of the airborne pollutant considered and ACH through time comes from the following equation:

${\operatorname{d}\!C\over\operatorname{d}\!t} = - ACH * C$

The solution of this differential equation is: $C(t) = C_0 * \exp(- ACH * t)$

For t = 1h and ACH = 1 we get: $\frac{C(1)}{C_0}=\text{ exp( }-\text{1 }*\text{ }1) \approx 0.368$

It means that 36.8 % of the initial pollutant concentration remains after 1 hour at 1 ACH. It corresponds to a 63.2 % concentration reduction of the pollutant.

In order to achieve equilibrium pressure, the amount of return air (air leaving the space) and the amount of supply air (air entering the space) must be the same.

== Definitions ==
Age of air
The average time elapsed since molecules of air in a given volume of air entered the building from outside.
Concentration
The quantity of one constituent dispersed in a defined amount of another.
Concentration, tracer gas
The volume or mass of tracer gas divided by the volume or mass of air plus tracer gas.
Outdoor air
Air outside a building or taken from outdoors and not previously circulated through the system.
Perfect mixing
A theoretical airflow distribution pattern within a ventilated space where the supply air is instantaneously and uniformly mixed with the air in the space such that the concentration of all constituents in the air, and the age of air, are spatially uniform.
Return air
Air extracted from a space and totally or partially returned to an air conditioner, furnace, or other heat source.
Supply air
Air entering a space from an air-conditioning, heating, or ventilating apparatus.

== Formulas ==
=== Air changes per hour ===
In Imperial units: $\quad ACPH = \frac{60\text{ min }\cdot Q}{V}$

where:

- ACPH = number of air changes per hour; higher values correspond to more ventilation
- Q = Volumetric flow rate of air in cubic feet per minute (cfm)
- V = Space volume L × W × H, in cubic feet

In metric units $\quad ACPH = \frac{3600\text{ s }\cdot Q}{V}$

where:

- ACPH = number of air changes per hour; higher values correspond to more ventilation
- Q = Volumetric flow rate of air in cubic meters per second (m^{3}/s)
- V = Space volume L × W × H, in cubic meters

For a given room or building size and number of air changes per hour, the volumetric flow requirement is usually specified in cubic meters per hour when using metric units.

=== Ventilation rates ===
Ventilation rates are often expressed as a volume rate per person (CFM per person, L/s per person). The conversion between air changes per hour and ventilation rate per person is as follows:

$\quad R_p = \frac{ACPH*D*h}{60}$

where:

- R_{p} = ventilation rate per person (in cubic feet per minute per person (cfm/person))
- ACPH = Air changes per hour
- D = floor area per occupant (in square feet per occupant)
- h = Ceiling height (in feet)

Having $1 m^3/h = {1,000 \over 3,600} L/s = {1 \over 3.6} L/s$, the corresponding metric expression for liters per second per person is:

$\quad R_p = \frac{ACPH*D*h}{3.6}$

where:

- R_{p} = ventilation rate per person (in liters per second per person)
- ACPH = Air changes per hour
- D = floor area per person (in square meters per person)
- h = Ceiling height (in meters)

== Air change rate recommendations ==
Air change rates are often used as rules of thumb in ventilation design. However, they are seldom used as the actual basis of design or calculation. For example, residential ventilation rates are calculated based on area of the residence and number of occupants. Non-residential ventilation rates are based on floor area and number of occupants, or a calculated dilution of known contaminants. Hospital design standards use air changes per hour. Recommended air changes rates can be found in relevant standards. Recent research indicates that Air Changes per Hour (ACH) alone may not be a reliable parameter for making ventilation recommendations. A new parameter, effective Air Changes per Hour (called ACHH by Mojtaba Zabihi et al.), which incorporates both the flow rate and large-scale airflow patterns, could provide a more accurate measure of how efficiently air is supplied and circulated within a room. This is particularly important for effectively managing airborne disease spread.

Air filtration contributes to airborne contaminant removal. The notion of equivalent air changes per hour allows to express the contribution of these air-cleaning technologies. For a portable air cleaner we have:

$eACH = \frac{CADR}{V}$

where:

- eACH = equivalent rate of clean air renewal (resulting from filtration or other air treatment) (expressed per hour)
- CADR = clean air delivery rate (characterizing the particle-removal performance of air cleaners) (in cubic meter per hour)
- V = space volume (in cubic meter)

The Centers for Disease Control and Prevention (CDC) recommends aiming for at least five ACH of clean air, when feasible, in order to reduce airborne viral particles, while the EPA mentions that particle filtration isn't an alternative of outdoor-air ventilation systems. The five ACH target from CDC is not a universal requirement as ventilation depends on many factors such as space, occupancy and intended use.

== Methods of measurement ==
Air changes per hour is a measurement intended to communicate the air change effectiveness of a space's ventilation system. Discussion around the ASHRAE standard 62, Ventilation for Acceptable Indoor Air Quality led to the development of a more direct method of measuring air change effectiveness with the use of a tracer gas. A tracer gas is a small amount of easily detected gas which is mixed with air in order to study airflow patterns. This method directly compares the age of the air where occupants breathe to the age of air that would occur were the air of the space perfectly mixed. The method is designed to more accurately understand the effects of air-flow patterns within a space, to identify or avoid such occurrences as short-circuiting airflow patterns, in which most of the supply air goes directly to the exhaust, and fails to mix with the air already present.

There are two ways to apply this method; the most commonly used technique, Tracer Gas Decay (step-down), consists of a short burst of gas injected into the space to establish a constant concentration within the building, then injection is stopped and concentration decay at a certain position is recorded, and second Tracer Gas Step-Up, where tracer gas is injected at a constant rate and the concentration response at a certain position is recorded

== Airtightness in building ==
The most common technique to measure airtightness is the fan pressurization method, also known as the blower door test at 50 Pa. It is measured by the number of air changes per hour (ACH) that occur when there is a differential pressure of 50 pascals between outside and inside the building. Thus the ACH measured under these conditions is qualified as ACH50. If an air volume equal to the inside volume of the building flows across the envelope in one hour, then ACH = 1. Airtightness improves buildings' energy performance since low airtightness levels imply high infiltration rates, draughts, risk of condensation, and moisture accumulation, and other effects. For this reason, the Passive House standard established performance requirements for airtightness requiring be less than 0.6 ACH with a pressure difference between inside and outside of 50 Pa.

It is worth noting that ACH measured with the blower door test, at a differential pressure of 50 pascals, mimics the situation of a sustained 20 mph (32 km/h) wind outside. The natural air leakage, under calmer conditions, is likely to be much less. As a result, the so-called natural ACH may be a factor of 10-25 times smaller (approximation, can't be applied universally). This is of relevance since high-performance building methodologies strive to keep ACH low under standardized, weather-stressed conditions, while air quality considerations may require sufficiently high natural ACH.

== Effects of ACH due to forced ventilation in a dwelling ==
Forced ventilation to increase ACH becomes a necessity to maintain acceptable air quality as occupants become reluctant to open windows due to behavioural changes such as keeping windows closed for security.

Air changes are often cited as a means of preventing condensation in houses with forced ventilation systems often rated 3–5 ACH though without referencing the size of the house. However, where ACH is already greater than 0.75 a forced ventilation system is unlikely to be of use at controlling condensation and instead insulation or heating are better remedies. Seven out of eight houses studied in NZ in 2010 had an ACH (corrected for ventilation factors) of 0.75 or greater. The presence of forced ventilation systems has been shown in some cases to actually increase the humidity rather than lower it. By displacing air inside a dwelling with infiltrated air (air brought in from outside the dwelling), positive pressure ventilation systems can increase heating (in winter) or cooling (in summer) requirements in a house. For example, to maintain a 15 °C temperature in a certain dwelling about 3.0 kW of heating are required at 0 ACH (no heat loss due to warmed air leaving the dwelling, instead heat is lost due to conduction or radiation), 3.8 kW at 1 ACH and 4.5 kW are required at 2 ACH. The use of roof space for heating or cooling was seen as ineffectual with the maximum heating benefits occurring in winter in more southerly regions (being close to the South Pole in these southern hemisphere reports) but being equivalent only to about 0.5 kW or the heating provided by about five 100 W incandescent light bulbs; cooling effects in summer were similarly small and were more pronounced for more northerly homes (being closer to the equator); in all cases the values assumed that the ventilation system automatically disengaged when the infiltrating air was warmer or cooler (as appropriate) than the air already in the dwelling as it would otherwise exacerbate the undesirable conditions in the house.

== Effects of air changes per hour on airborne transmission ==
Airborne transmission occurs when infectious pathogens travel through the air via small particles and aerosols generated by breathing, talking, coughing or sneezing. Higher air change rates lower exposure to airborne disease by diluting infectious aerosol, which reduces the concentration left for other occupants to inhale. ASHRAE Standard 170, which covers ventilation in health care facilities, requires at least 12 total ACH in airborne infection isolation rooms. ACH is an average that assumes that the air in a room is perfectly mixed. A computational fluid dynamics model of a patient room showed that the path between the infected patient and the exhaust grille contributed more to contaminant transmission than the air change rate. When supply air crossed that path, the contaminant spread to other parts of the room, with the exhaust directly above the patient and the supply air directed away, the contaminant was much better controlled. In the first layout, raising the airflow from 4 to 12 ACH had little effect on exposure above the patient, while in the second it reduced exposure. An experimental study simulated a cough release containing airborne droplets in a full-scale chamber with overhead mixing ventilation and found that the local airflow around each occupant strongly shaped where the droplets went. The authors concluded that the air change rate should not be used as the only indicator of a ventilation system's ability to reduce exposure to airborne infectious droplets.

ACH also does not take into consideration the number of people in the room. A 10,000 ft³ classroom at 6 ACH receives 1,000 cfm whether it holds 10 students or 40. ASHRAE Standard 241, published in 2023, sets a minimum equivalent clean airflow per person (ECAi) for use in Infection Risk Management Mode. It counts outdoor air, filtration, and air cleaners together: 40 cfm per person in classrooms and 30 cfm per person in offices. Because the target is set per occupant, the required clean airflow rises with the number of people in the room.
