= Vakil Caravanserai =

Historic site in Kerman, Iran

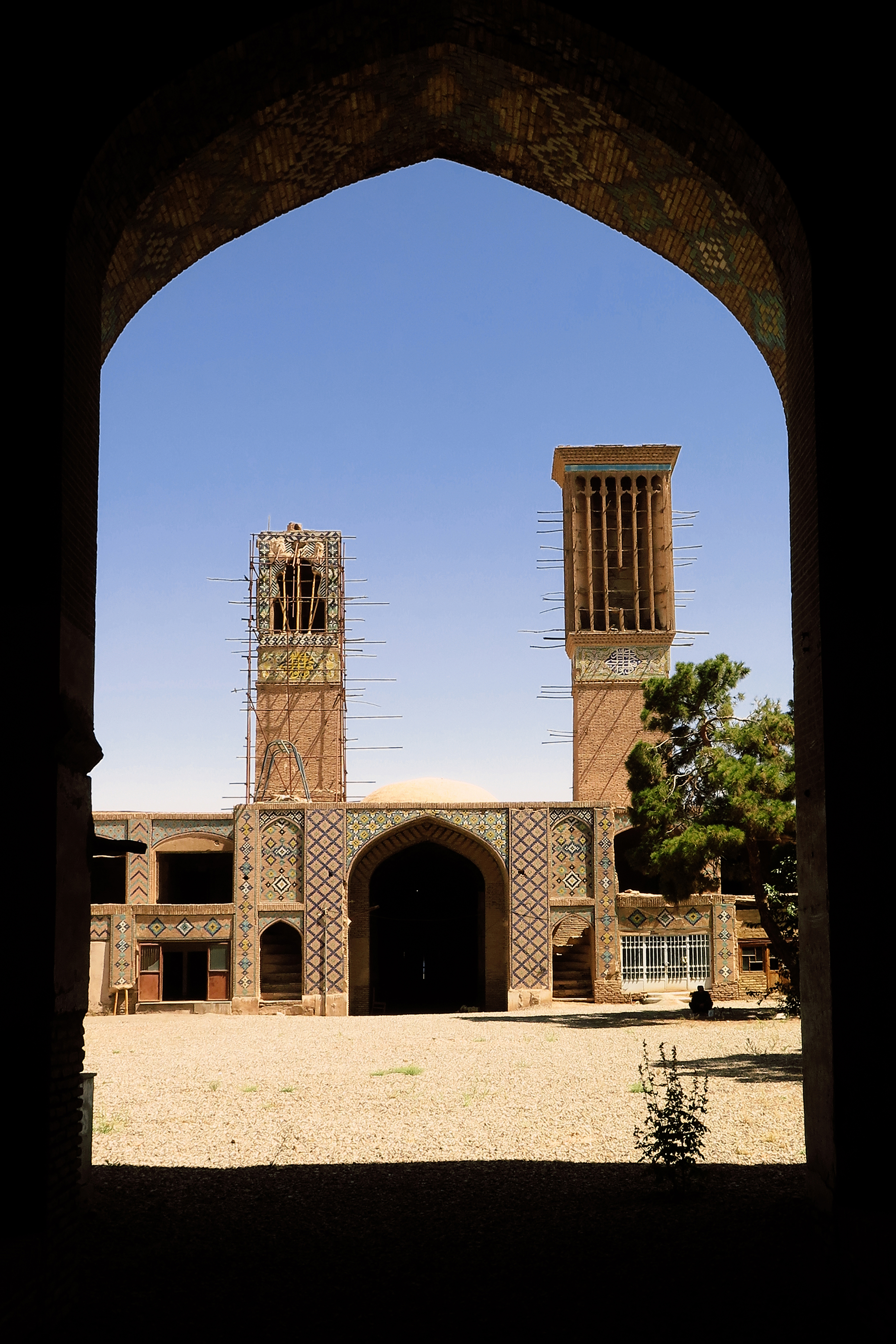
- Interactive map of Vakil Caravanserai
- Location: Kerman, Kerman province, Iran
- Coordinates: 30.2914°N 57.0807°E
- Built: Qajar era, 1870

Vakil Caravanserai (Persian: کاروانسرای وکیل) is located in the southern Iranian city of Kerman. It is one of the largest Caravanserais in the world. Vakil Caravanserai has 120 rooms in two floors. It was built around 1870 by the order of Mohammad Ismail Khan, the governor of Kerman.

== Architecture ==
Vakil caravanserai consists of two floors and has 120 rooms. There are 81 rooms on the first floor and 31 on the second. The caravanserai has two entrances opening to the Vakil market (Bazaar-e Vakil). The entrance facade to Vakil caravanserai, which opens into the market is decorated with tiles. This is the same from outside porch. One of the most valuable features of this caravanserai is its windcatcher. Another historical attraction is the clock tower which has a long history of how it got to Iran.

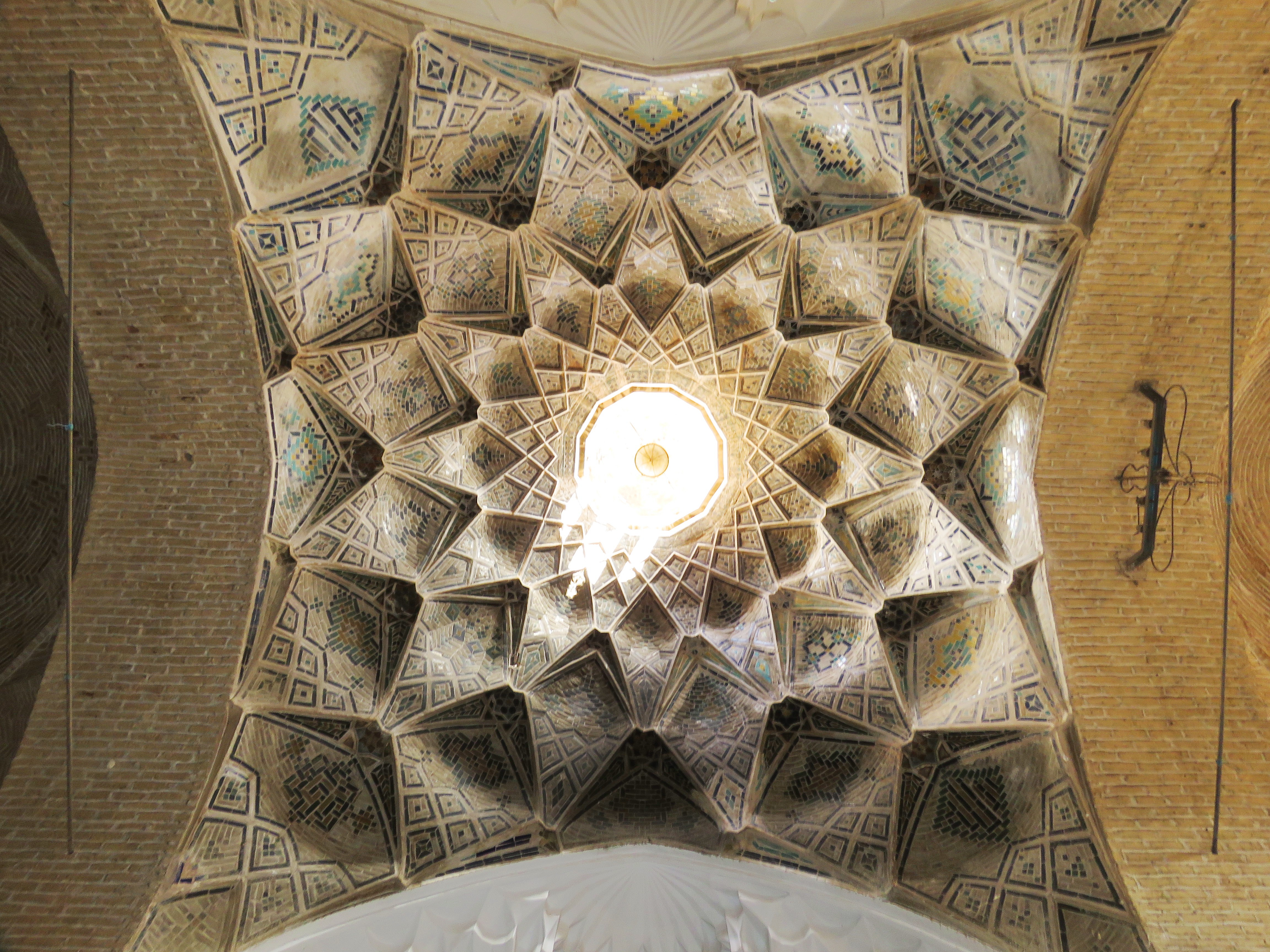
Ceiling of Vakil Bazar at the entrance to the caravanserai

Muqarnas decorations of the southern entrance

== Gallery ==

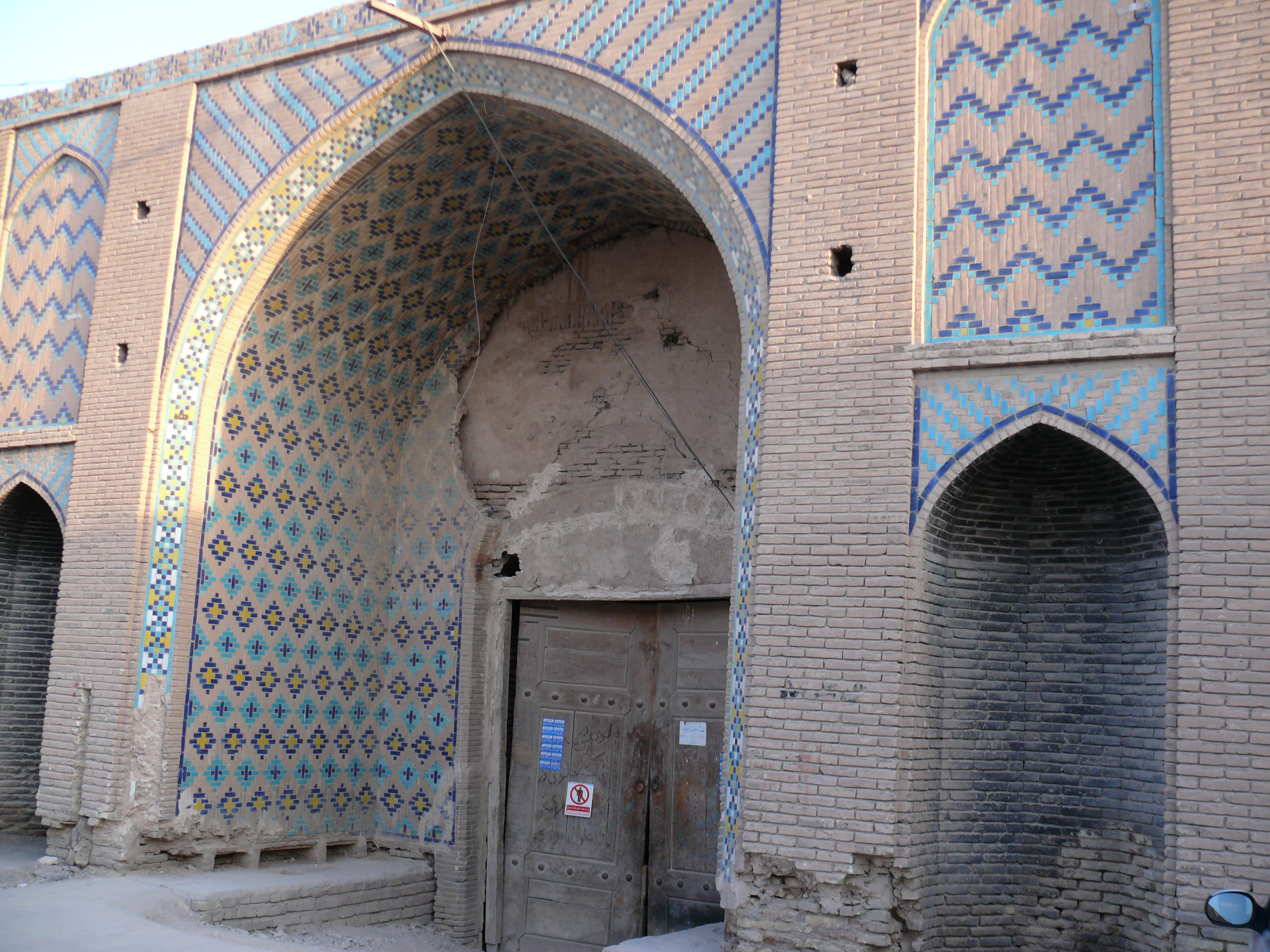

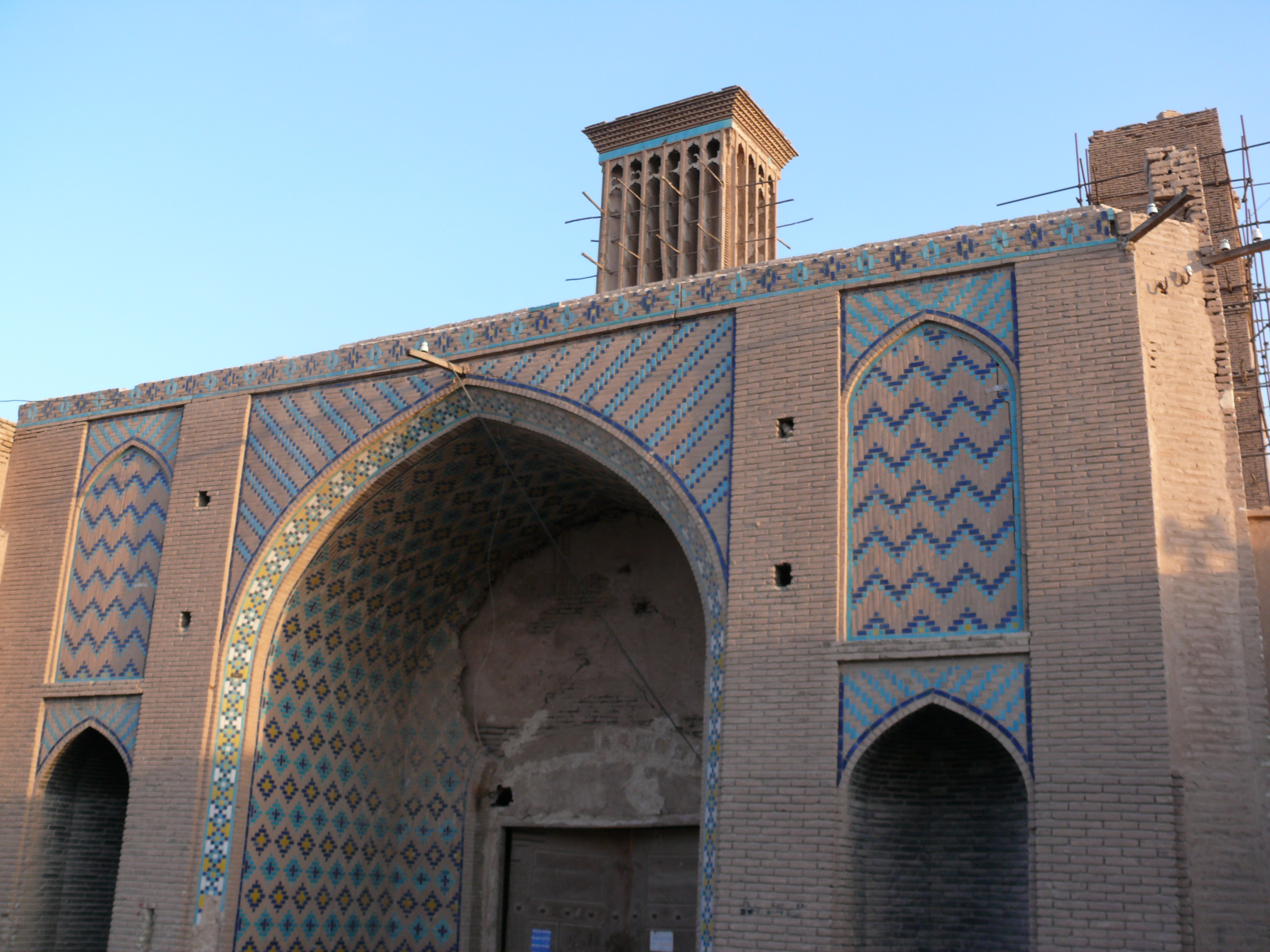

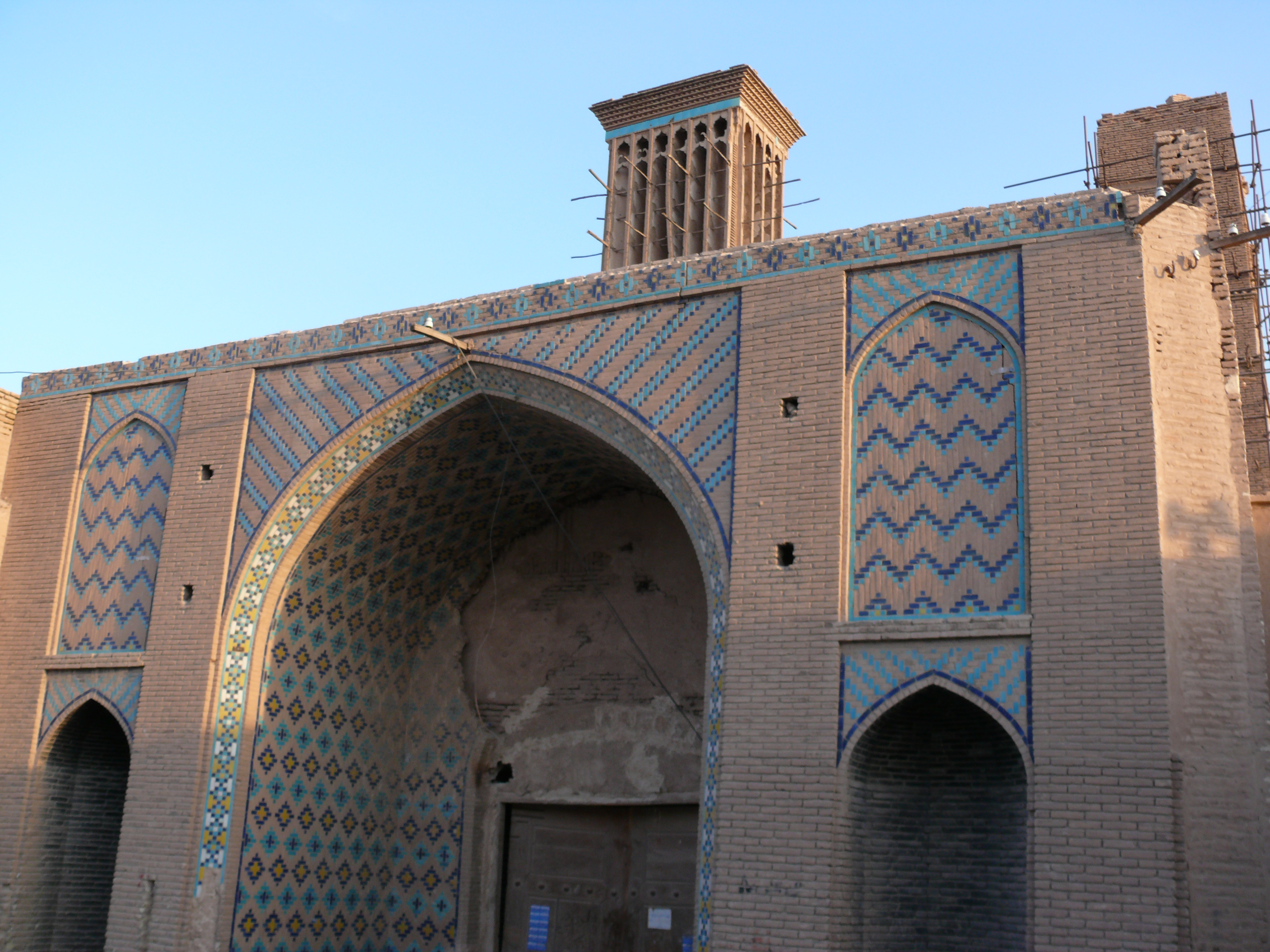

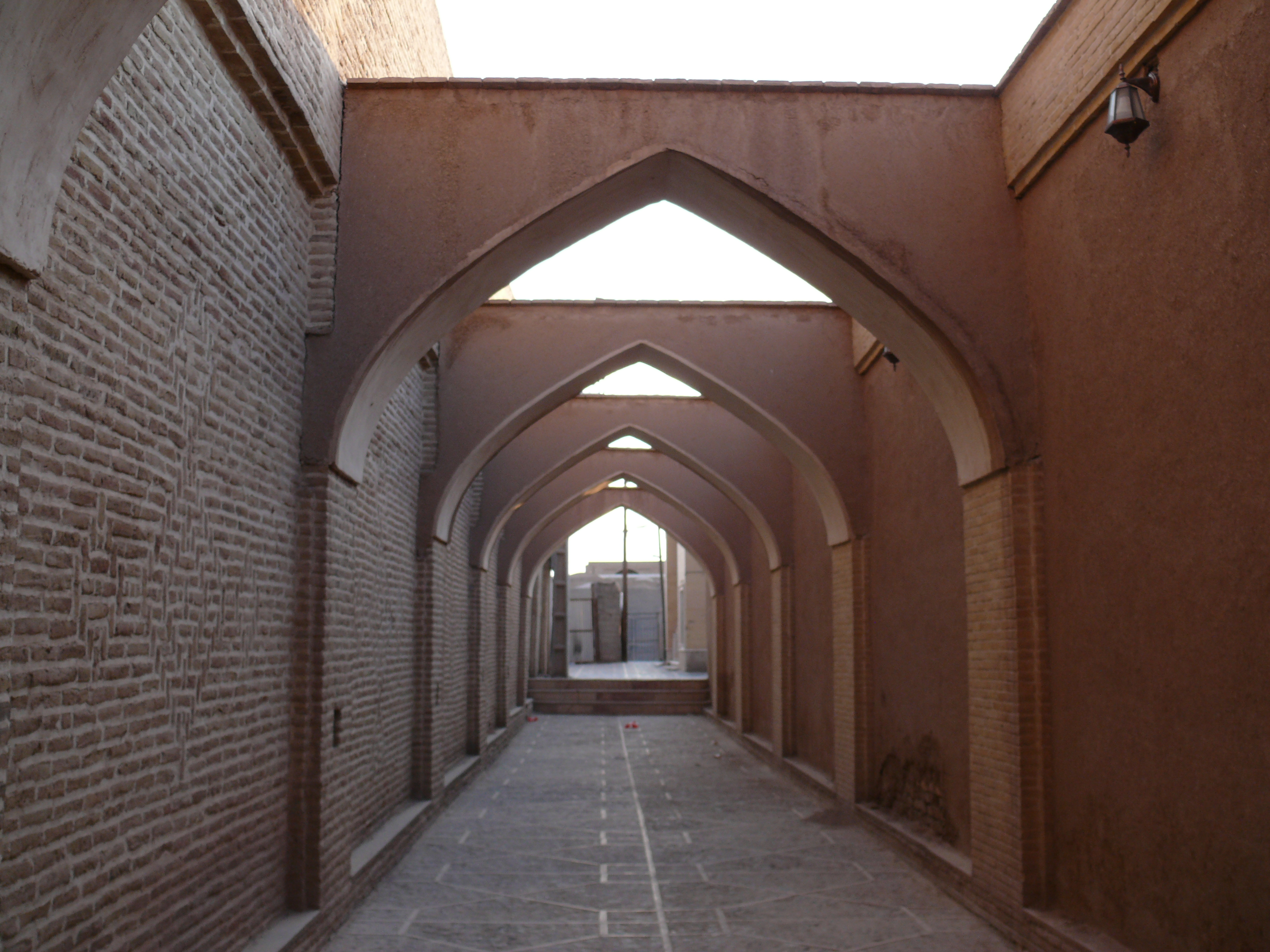

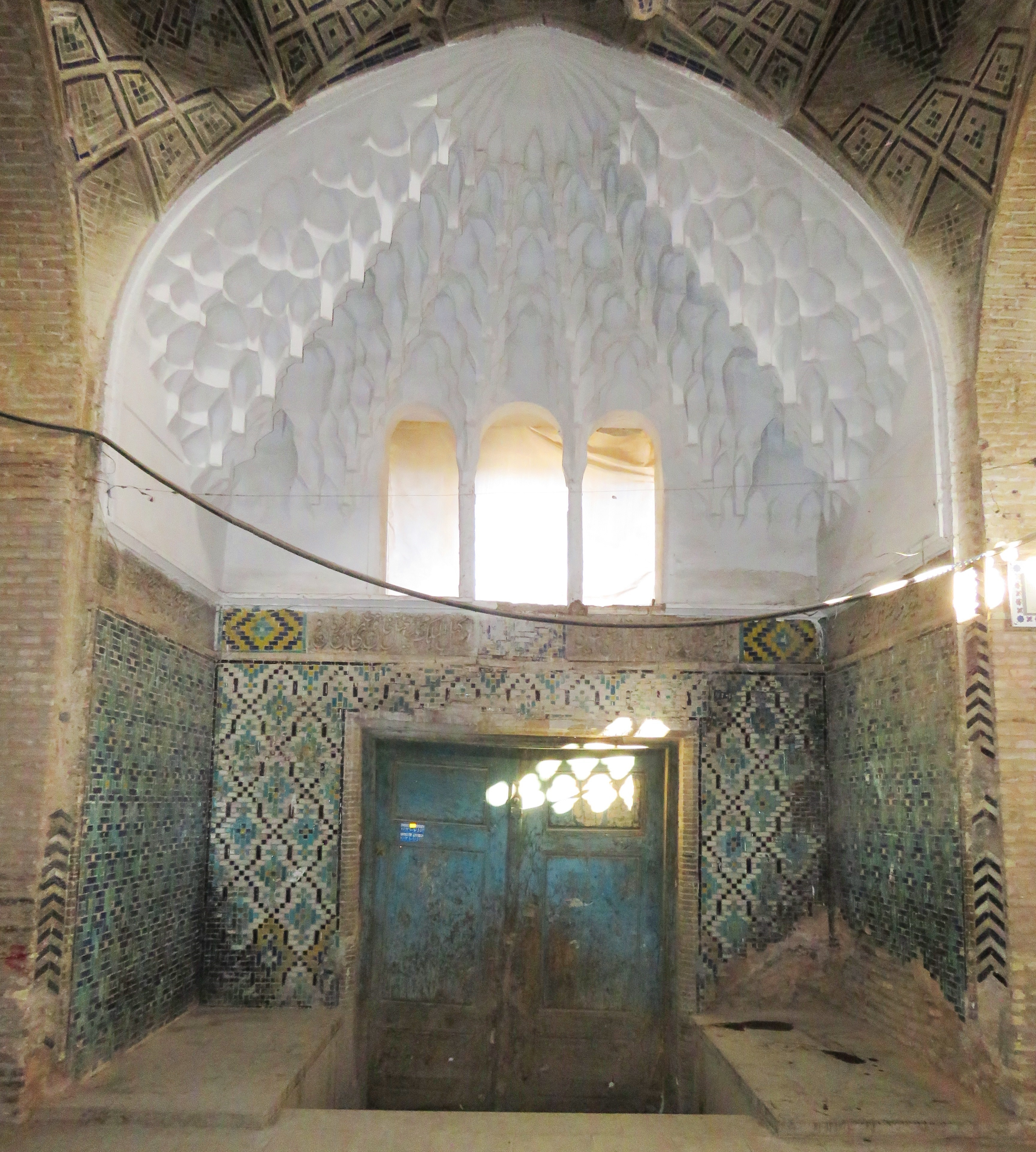

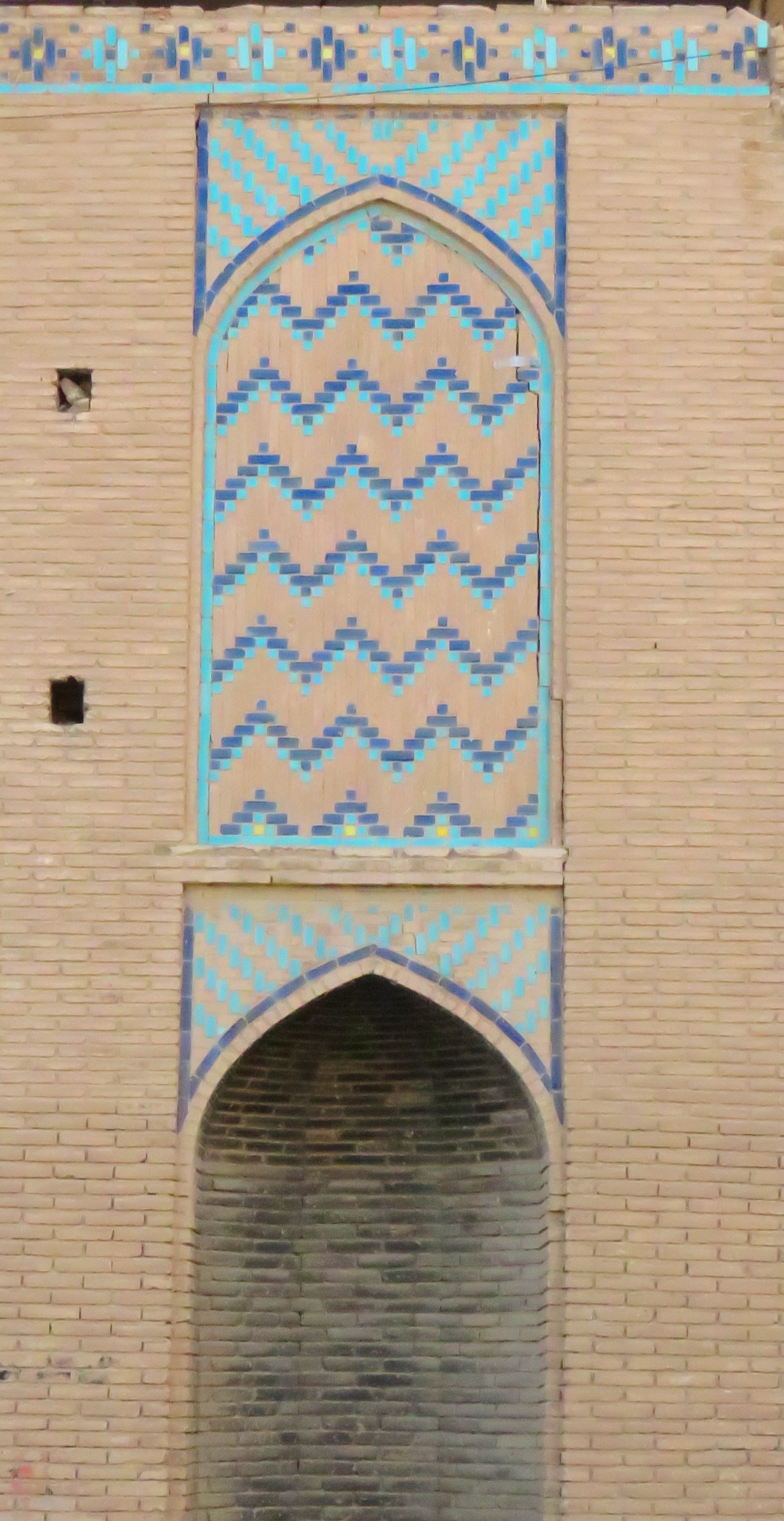

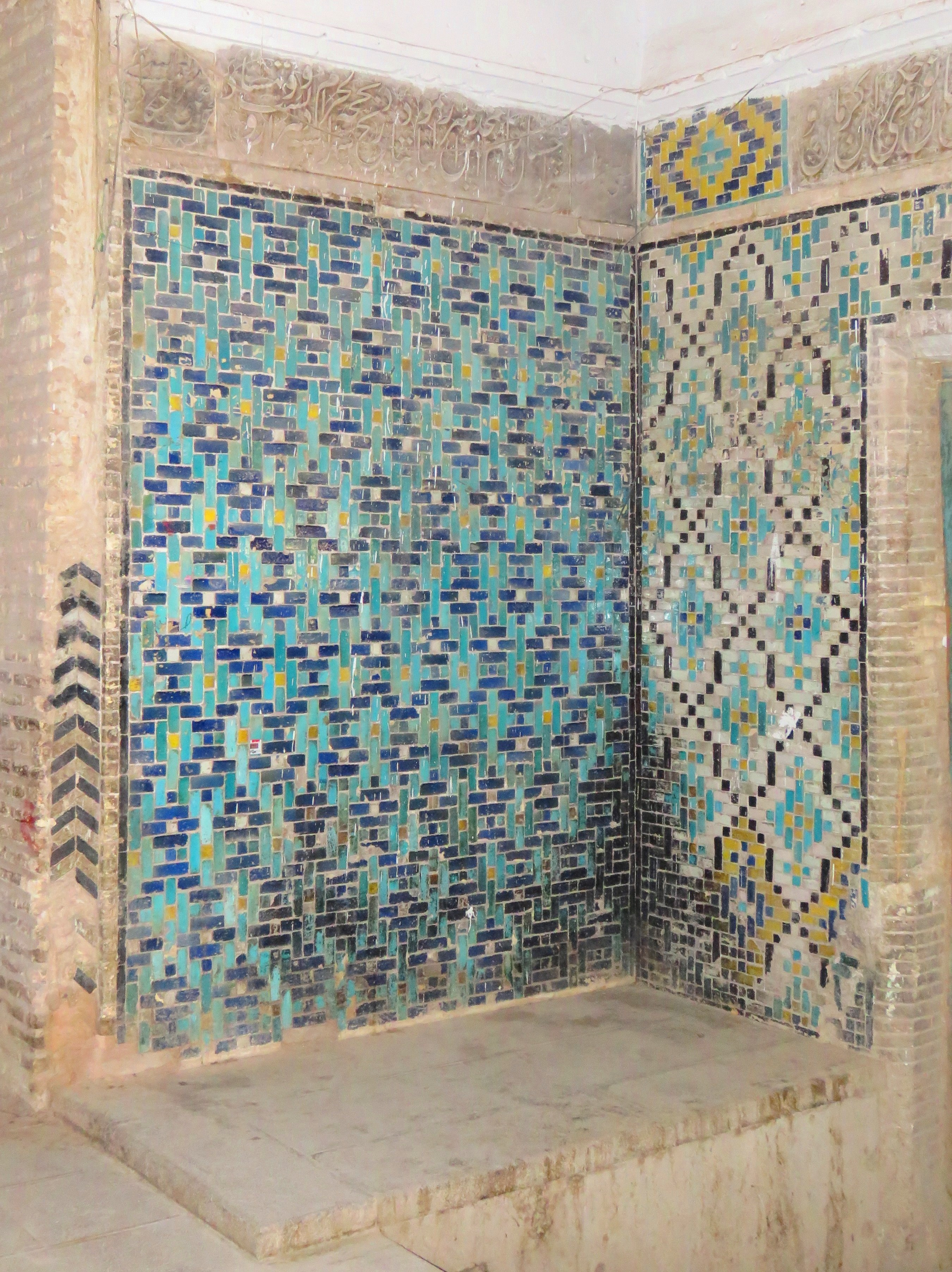
