= Density of air =

Mass per unit volume of the Earth's atmosphere

The density of air or atmospheric density, denoted ρ, (Note: Rho is widely used as a generic symbol for density) is the mass per unit volume of Earth's atmosphere at a given point and time. Air density, like air pressure, decreases with increasing altitude. It also changes with variations in atmospheric pressure, temperature, and humidity. According to the ISO International Standard Atmosphere (ISA), the standard sea level density of air at 101.325 kPa (abs) and 15 °C (59 °F) is 1.2250 kg/m^{3} (0.07647 lb/cu ft). This is about 1/800 that of water, which has a density of about 1,000 kg/m^{3} (62 lb/cu ft).

Air density is a property used in many branches of science, engineering, and industry, including aeronautics; gravimetric analysis; the air-conditioning industry; atmospheric research and meteorology; agricultural engineering (modeling and tracking of Soil-Vegetation-Atmosphere-Transfer (SVAT) models); and the engineering community that deals with compressed air.

Depending on the measuring instruments used, different sets of equations for the calculation of the density of air can be applied. Air is a mixture of gases and the calculations always simplify, to a greater or lesser extent, the properties of the mixture.

== Temperature ==
Other things being equal (most notably the pressure and humidity), hotter air is less dense than cooler air and will thus rise while cooler air tends to fall due to buoyancy. This can be seen by using the ideal gas law as an approximation.

== Dry air ==
The density of dry air can be calculated using the ideal gas law, expressed as a function of temperature and pressure:
$$\begin{align}
\rho &= \frac{p}{R_\text{specific} T}\\
R_\text{specific} &= \frac{R}{M} = \frac{k_{\rm B}}{m}\\
\rho &= \frac{pM}{RT} = \frac{pm}{k_{\rm B}T}\\
\end{align}$$

where:

- $\rho$, air density (kg/m^{3}) (Note: In the SI unit system. However, other units can be used.)
- $p$, absolute pressure (Pa)
- $T$, absolute temperature (K)
- $R$ is the gas constant, 8.31446261815324 in J⋅K^{−1}⋅mol^{−1}
- $M$ is the molar mass of dry air, approximately 0.0289652 in kg⋅mol^{−1}.
- $k_{\rm B}$ is the Boltzmann constant, 1.380649×10^{−23} in J⋅K^{−1}
- $m$ is the molecular mass of dry air, approximately 4.81×10^{−26} in kg.
- $R_\text{specific}$, the specific gas constant for dry air, which using the values presented above would be approximately 287.0500676 in J⋅kg^{−1}⋅K^{−1}.

Therefore:

- At IUPAC standard temperature and pressure (0 °C and 100 kPa), dry air has a density of approximately 1.2754 kg/m^{3}.
- At 20 °C and 101.325 kPa, dry air has a density of 1.2041 kg/m^{3}.
- At 70 °F and 14.696 psi, dry air has a density of 0.074887 lb/ft^{3}.

The following table illustrates the air density–temperature relationship at 1 atm or 101.325 kPa:

Effect of temperature on properties of air
Celsius temperature θ [°C]	Speed of sound c [m/s]	Density of air ρ [kg/m^{3}]	Characteristic specific acoustic impedance z_{0} [Pa⋅s/m]
35	351.88	1.1455	403.2
30	349.02	1.1644	406.5
25	346.13	1.1839	409.4
20	343.21	1.2041	413.3
15	340.27	1.2250	416.9
10	337.31	1.2466	420.5
5	334.32	1.2691	424.3
0	331.30	1.2923	428.0
−5	328.25	1.3164	432.1
−10	325.18	1.3414	436.1
−15	322.07	1.3674	440.3
−20	318.94	1.3943	444.6
−25	315.77	1.4224	449.1

== Humid air ==
Effect of temperature and relative humidity on air density

The addition of water vapor to air (making the air humid) reduces the density of the air, which may at first appear counter-intuitive. This occurs because the molar mass of water vapor (18 g/mol) is less than the molar mass of dry air (Note: as dry air is a mixture of gases, its molar mass is the weighted average of the molar masses of its components) (around 29 g/mol). For any ideal gas, at a given temperature and pressure, the number of molecules is constant for a particular volume (see Avogadro's Law). So when water molecules (water vapor) are added to a given volume of air, the dry air molecules must decrease by the same number, to keep the pressure from increasing or temperature from decreasing. Hence the mass per unit volume of the gas (its density) decreases.

The density of humid air may be calculated by treating it as a mixture of ideal gases. In this case, the partial pressure of water vapor is known as the vapor pressure. Using this method, error in the density calculation is less than 0.2% in the range of −10 °C to 50 °C. The density of humid air is found by:
$$\rho_\text{humid air} = \frac{p_\text{d}}{R_\text{d} T} + \frac{p_\text{v}}{R_\text{v} T} = \frac{p_\text{d}M_\text{d} + p_\text{v}M_\text{v}}{R T}$$

where:

- $\rho_\text{humid air}$, density of the humid air (kg/m^{3})
- $p_\text{d}$, partial pressure of dry air (Pa)
- $R_\text{d}$, specific gas constant for dry air, 287.058 J/(kg·K)
- $T$, temperature (K)
- $p_\text{v}$, pressure of water vapor (Pa)
- $R_\text{v}$, specific gas constant for water vapor, 461.495 J/(kg·K)
- $M_\text{d}$, molar mass of dry air, 0.0289652 kg/mol
- $M_\text{v}$, molar mass of water vapor, 0.018016 kg/mol
- $R$, universal gas constant, 8.31446 J/(K·mol)

The vapor pressure of water may be calculated from the saturation vapor pressure and relative humidity. It is found by:
$$p_\text{v} = \phi p_\text{sat}$$

where:

- $p_\text{v}$, vapor pressure of water
- $\phi$, relative humidity (0.0–1.0)
- $p_\text{sat}$, saturation vapor pressure

The saturation vapor pressure of water at any given temperature is the vapor pressure when relative humidity is 100%. One formula is Tetens' equation from used to find the saturation vapor pressure is:
$$p_\text{sat} =0.61078 \exp\left(\frac{17.27 (T-273.15)}{T-35.85}\right)$$
where:

- $p_\text{sat}$, saturation vapor pressure (kPa)
- $T$, temperature (K)

See vapor pressure of water for other equations.

The partial pressure of dry air $p_\text{d}$ is found considering partial pressure, resulting in:
$$p_\text{d} = p - p_\text{v}$$
where $p$ simply denotes the observed absolute pressure.

== Variation with altitude ==
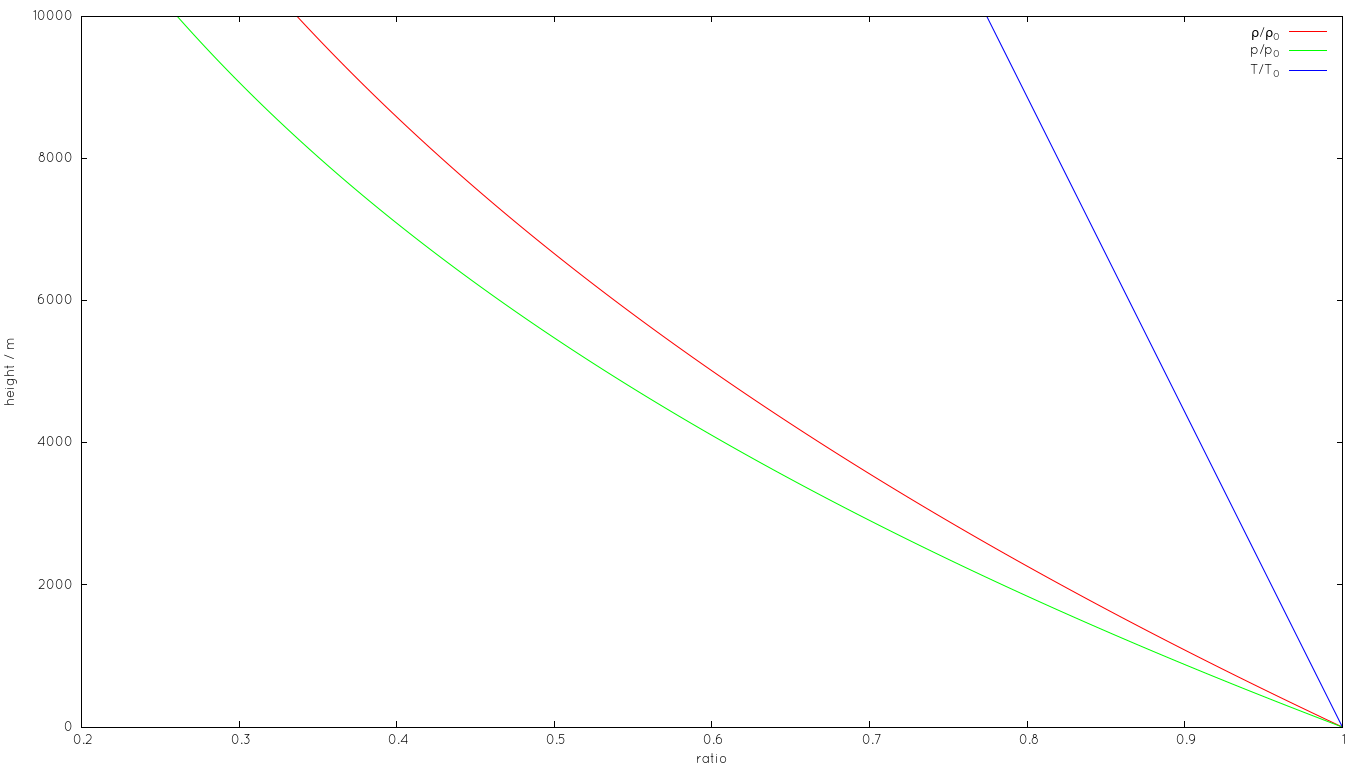
Standard atmosphere: p_{0} = 101.325 kPa, T_{0} = 288.15 K, ρ_{0} = 1.225 kg/m^{3}

=== Troposphere ===
To calculate the density of air as a function of altitude, one requires additional parameters. For the troposphere, the lowest part (~10 km) of the atmosphere, they are listed below, along with their values according to the International Standard Atmosphere, using for calculation the universal gas constant instead of the air specific constant:

- $p_0$, sea level standard atmospheric pressure, 101325 Pa
- $T_0$, sea level standard temperature, 288.15 K
- $g$, earth-surface gravitational acceleration, 9.80665 m/s^{2}
- $L$, temperature lapse rate, 0.0065 K/m
- $R$, ideal (universal) gas constant, 8.31446 J/(mol·K)
- $M$, molar mass of dry air, 0.0289652 kg/mol

Temperature at altitude $h$ meters above sea level is approximated by the following formula (only valid inside the troposphere, no more than ~18 km above Earth's surface (and lower away from Equator)):
$$T = T_0 - L h$$

The pressure at altitude $h$ is given by:
$$p = p_0 \left(1 - \frac{L h}{T_0}\right)^\frac{g M}{R L}$$

Density can then be calculated according to a molar form of the ideal gas law:
$$\rho = \frac{p M}{R T}
= \frac{p M}{R T_0 \left(1 - \frac{Lh}{T_0}\right)}
= \frac{p_0 M}{R T_0} \left(1 - \frac{L h}{T_0} \right)^{\frac{g M}{R L} - 1}$$

where:

- $M$, molar mass
- $R$, ideal gas constant
- $T$, absolute temperature
- $p$, absolute pressure

Note that the density close to the ground is $\rho_0 = \frac{p_0 M}{R T_0}$

It can be easily verified that the hydrostatic equation holds:
$$\frac{dp}{dh} = -g\rho .$$

==== Exponential approximation ====
As the temperature varies with height inside the troposphere by less than 25%, $\frac{Lh}{T_0} < 0.25$ and one may approximate:
$$\rho = \rho_0 e^{\left(\frac{g M}{R L} - 1\right) \ln \left(1 - \frac{L h}{T_0}\right)}
\approx \rho_0 e^{-\left(\frac{g M}{R L} - 1\right)\frac{L h}{T_0}}
= \rho_0 e^{-\left(\frac{g M h}{R T_0} - \frac{L h}{T_0}\right)}$$

Thus:
$$\rho \approx \rho_0 e^{-h/H_n}$$

Which is identical to the isothermal solution, except that H_{n}, the height scale of the exponential fall for density (as well as for number density n), is not equal to RT_{0}/gM as one would expect for an isothermal atmosphere, but rather:
$$\frac{1}{H_n} = \frac{g M}{R T_0} - \frac{L}{T_0}$$

Which gives H_{n} = 10.4 km.

Note that for different gasses, the value of H_{n} differs, according to the molar mass M: It is 10.9 for nitrogen, 9.2 for oxygen and 6.3 for carbon dioxide. The theoretical value for water vapor is 19.6, but due to vapor condensation the water vapor density dependence is highly variable and is not well approximated by this formula.

The pressure can be approximated by another exponent:
$$p = p_0 e^{\frac{g M}{R L} \ln \left(1 - \frac{L h}{T_0}\right)}
\approx p_0 e^{-\frac{g M}{R L}\frac{L h}{T_0}}
= p_0 e^{-\frac{g M h}{R T_0}}$$

Which is identical to the isothermal solution, with the same height scale H_{p} = RT_{0}/gM. Note that the hydrostatic equation no longer holds for the exponential approximation (unless L is neglected).

H_{p} is 8.4 km, but for different gasses (measuring their partial pressure), it is again different and depends upon molar mass, giving 8.7 for nitrogen, 7.6 for oxygen and 5.6 for carbon dioxide.

==== Total content ====
Further note that since g, Earth's gravitational acceleration, is approximately constant with altitude in the atmosphere, the pressure at height h is proportional to the integral of the density in the column above h, and therefore to the mass in the atmosphere above height h. Therefore, the mass fraction of the troposphere out of all the atmosphere is given using the approximated formula for p:
$$1 - \frac{p(h = 11\text{ km})}{p_0}  = 1 - \left(\frac{T(11\text{ km})}{T_0} \right)^\frac{g M}{R L} \approx 76\%$$

For nitrogen, it is 75%, while for oxygen this is 79%, and for carbon dioxide, 88%.

=== Tropopause ===
Higher than the troposphere, at the tropopause, the temperature is approximately constant with altitude (up to ~20 km) and is 220 K. This means that at this layer L = 0 and T = 220 K, so that the exponential drop is faster, with H_{TP} = 6.3 km for air (6.5 for nitrogen, 5.7 for oxygen and 4.2 for carbon dioxide). Both the pressure and density obey this law, so, denoting the height of the border between the troposphere and the tropopause as U:

$$\begin{align}
p &=    p(U) e^{-\frac{h - U}{H_\text{TP}}} =    p_0 \left(1 - \frac{L U}{T_0}\right)^\frac{g M}{R L} e^{-\frac{h - U}{H_\text{TP}}} \\
\rho &= \rho(U) e^{-\frac{h - U}{H_\text{TP}}} = \rho_0 \left(1 - \frac{L U}{T_0}\right)^{\frac{g M}{R L} - 1} e^{-\frac{h - U}{H_\text{TP}}}
\end{align}$$

== Composition ==
Composition of dry atmosphere, by volume (Note: Concentration pertains to the troposphere) (Note: Total values may not add up to exactly 100% due to roundoff and uncertainty.)
Gas (and others)		Various		CIPM-2007		ASHRAE		Schlatter		ICAO		US StdAtm76		▼ Tap to expand or collapse table ▲
Gas (and others)		ppmv (Note: ppmv: parts per million by volume. Volume fraction is equal to mole fraction for ideal gas only, see volume (thermodynamics).)	percentage	ppmv	percentage	ppmv	percentage	ppmv	percentage	ppmv	percentage	ppmv	percentage	▼ Tap to expand or collapse table ▲
Nitrogen	N_{2}	780,800	78.080%	780,848	78.0848%	780,818	78.0818%	780,840	78.084%	780,840	78.084%	780,840	78.084%	▼ Tap to expand or collapse table ▲
Oxygen	O_{2}	209,500	20.950%	209,390	20.9390%	209,435	20.9435%	209,460	20.946%	209,476	20.9476%	209,476	20.9476%	▼ Tap to expand or collapse table ▲
Argon	Ar	9,340	0.9340%	9,332	0.9332%	9,332	0.9332%	9,340	0.9340%	9,340	0.9340%	9,340	0.9340%	▼ Tap to expand or collapse table ▲
Carbon dioxide	CO_{2}	397.8	0.03978%	400	0.0400%	385	0.0385%	384	0.0384%	314	0.0314%	314	0.0314%	▼ Tap to expand or collapse table ▲
Neon	Ne	18.18	0.001818%	18.2	0.00182%	18.2	0.00182%	18.18	0.001818%	18.18	0.001818%	18.18	0.001818%	▼ Tap to expand or collapse table ▲
Helium	He	5.24	0.000524%	5.2	0.00052%	5.2	0.00052%	5.24	0.000524%	5.24	0.000524%	5.24	0.000524%	▼ Tap to expand or collapse table ▲
Methane	CH_{4}	1.81	0.000181%	1.5	0.00015%	1.5	0.00015%	1.774	0.0001774%	2	0.0002%	2	0.0002%	▼ Tap to expand or collapse table ▲
Krypton	Kr	1.14	0.000114%	1.1	0.00011%	1.1	0.00011%	1.14	0.000114%	1.14	0.000114%	1.14	0.000114%	▼ Tap to expand or collapse table ▲
Hydrogen	H_{2}	0.55	0.000055%	0.5	0.00005%	0.5	0.00005%	0.56	0.000056%	0.5	0.00005%	0.5	0.00005%	▼ Tap to expand or collapse table ▲
Nitrous oxide	N_{2}O	0.325	0.0000325%	0.3	0.00003%	0.3	0.00003%	0.320	0.0000320%	0.5	0.00005%	-	-	▼ Tap to expand or collapse table ▲
Carbon monoxide	CO	0.1	0.00001%	0.2	0.00002%	0.2	0.00002%	-	-	-	-	-	-	▼ Tap to expand or collapse table ▲
Xenon	Xe	0.09	0.000009%	0.1	0.00001%	0.1	0.00001%	0.09	0.000009%	0.087	0.0000087%	0.087	0.0000087%	▼ Tap to expand or collapse table ▲
Nitrogen dioxide	NO_{2}	0.02	0.000002%	-	-	-	-	-	-	Up to 0.02	Up to 0.000002%	-	-	▼ Tap to expand or collapse table ▲
Iodine	I_{2}	0.01	0.000001%	-	-	-	-	-	-	Up to 0.01	Up to 0.000001%	-	-	▼ Tap to expand or collapse table ▲
Ammonia	NH_{3}	trace	trace	-	-	-	-	-	-			-	-	▼ Tap to expand or collapse table ▲
Sulfur dioxide	SO_{2}	trace	trace	-	-	-	-	-	-	Up to 1.00	Up to 0.0001%	-	-	▼ Tap to expand or collapse table ▲
Ozone	O_{3}	0.02 to 0.07	2 to 7×10^{−6}%	-	-	-	-	0.01 to 0.10	1 to 10×10^{−6}%	Up to 0.02 to 0.07 (Note: O_{3} concentration up to 0.07 ppmv (7×10^{−6}%) in summer and up to 0.02 ppmv (2×10^{−6}%) in winter.)	Up to 2 to 7×10^{−6}%	-	-	▼ Tap to expand or collapse table ▲
Trace to 30 ppm (Note: Volumetric composition value adjustment factor (sum of all trace gases, below the CO_{2}, and adjusts for 30 ppmv))	—	-	-	-	-	2.9	0.00029%	-	-	-	-	-	-	▼ Tap to expand or collapse table ▲
Dry air total	air	1,000,000	100.00%	1,000,000	100.00%	1,000,000	100.00%	1,000,000	100.00%	1,000,000	100.00%	1,000,080	100.00%	▼ Tap to expand or collapse table ▲
Not included in above dry atmosphere														▼ Tap to expand or collapse table ▲
Water vapor	H_{2}O	~0.25% by mass over full atmosphere, locally 0.001–5% by volume.						~0.25% by mass over full atmosphere, locally 0.001–5% by volume.						▼ Tap to expand or collapse table ▲
▽ notes														▼ Tap to expand or collapse table ▲

== See also ==
- Air
- Atmospheric drag
- Lighter than air
- Density
- Atmosphere of Earth
- International Standard Atmosphere
- U.S. Standard Atmosphere
- NRLMSISE-00
