= Saturation vapor density =

Maximum density of water vapor at given temperature

The saturation vapor density (SVD) is the maximum density of water vapor at a given temperature. The concept is related to saturation vapor pressure (SVP). It can be used to calculate exact quantity of water vapor in a volume from a relative humidity (RH = % local air humidity measured / local total air humidity possible ) Given an RH percentage, the density of water is given by RH × SVD = Actual Vapor Density. Alternatively, RH can be found by RH = Actual Vapor Density / SVD. As relative humidity is a dimensionless quantity (often expressed in terms of a percentage), vapor density can be stated in units of grams or kilograms per cubic meter.

For low temperatures (below approximately 400 K), SVD can be approximated from the SVP by the ideal gas law: P V = n R T where P is the SVP, V is the volume, n is the number of moles, R is the gas constant and T is the temperature in kelvins. The number of moles is related to density by n = m / M, where m is the mass of water present and M is the molar mass of water (18.01528 grams/mole). Thus, we get (P M)/(R T) = m/V = density.

The values shown at hyperphysics-sources indicate that the saturated vapor density is 4.85 g/m^{3} at 273 K, at which the saturated vapor pressure is 4.58 mm of Hg or 610.616447 Pa (760 mm of Hg ≈ 1 atm = 1.01325 * 10^{5} Pa).
