= Tetens equation =

Saturation vapour pressure of water calculation

The Tetens equation is an equation to calculate the saturation vapour pressure of water over liquid and ice. It is named after its creator, O. Tetens who was an early German meteorologist. He published his equation in 1930, and while the publication itself is rather obscure, the equation is widely known among meteorologists and climatologists because of its ease of use and relative accuracy at temperatures within the normal ranges of natural weather conditions.

The equation is structurally identical to the August-Roche-Magnus equation, but the coefficients differ.

== Formula ==
Monteith and Unsworth (2008) provide Tetens' formula for temperatures above 0 °C:

$$P = 0.61078 \exp\left(\frac{17.27 T}{T + 237.3}\right)$$

where temperature T is in degrees Celsius (°C) and saturation vapor pressure P is in kilopascals (kPa). According to Monteith and Unsworth, "Values of saturation vapour pressure from Tetens' formula are within 1 Pa of exact values up to 35 °C."

Murray (1967) provides Tetens' equation for temperatures below 0 °C:

$$P = 0.61078 \exp\left(\frac{21.875 T}{T + 265.5}\right)$$

== See also ==
- Vapour pressure of water
- Antoine equation
- Arden Buck equation
- Lee–Kesler method
- Goff–Gratch equation
