= Arden Buck equation =

Group of meteorological correlations

The Arden Buck equations are a group of empirical correlations that relate the saturation vapor pressure to temperature for moist air. The curve fits have been optimized for more accuracy than the Goff–Gratch equation in the range −80 to 50 °C (−112 to 122 °F).

A set of several equations were developed, each of which is applicable in a different situation.

== Formula ==
The equations suggested by Buck (1996) (which are modifications of the equations in Buck (1981)) are:

$P_{\mathrm{s}}\left(T \right) = 6.1121 \exp \left(\left( 18.678 - \frac{T} {234.5}\right)\left( \frac{T} {257.14 + T} \right)\right)$, over liquid water, T > 0 °C

$P_{\mathrm{s}}\left(T \right) = 6.1115 \exp \left(\left( 23.036 - \frac{T} {333.7}\right)\left( \frac{T} {279.82 + T} \right)\right)$, over ice, T < 0 °C

where:

- P_{s}(T) is the saturation vapor pressure in hPa
- exp(x) is the exponential function
- T is the air temperature in degrees Celsius

Buck (1981) also lists enhancement factors for a temperature range of −80 to 50 °C (−112 to 122 °F) at pressures of 1,000 mb, 500 mb, and 250 mb. These coefficients are listed in the table below.

Enhancement factor (EF)
°C	1,000 mb	500 mb	250 mb
-80		1.00410	1.00200
-70		1.00360	1.00180
-60	1.00640	1.00320	1.00160
-50	1.00580	1.00290	1.00140
-40	1.00520	1.00260	1.00130
-30	1.00470	1.00240	1.00120
-20	1.00440	1.00220	1.00120
-10	1.00410	1.00220	1.00120
0	1.00395	1.00219	1.00132
10	1.00388	1.00229	
20	1.00400	1.00251	
30	1.00426	1.00284	
40	1.00467	1.00323	
50	1.00519		

== See also ==
- Vapour pressure of water
- Antoine equation
- Tetens equation
- Lee–Kesler method
- Goff–Gratch equation
