= Humidistat =

Electronic device which responds to relative humidity

A humidistat or hygrostat is an electronic device analogous to a thermostat but which responds to relative humidity, not temperature. A typical humidistat is usually included with portable humidifiers or dehumidifiers. It can also be included with combined air cleaner or humidifier units to control a home's humidity level or any other indoor space.

== Usage ==
Humidistats are used in a number of devices including dehumidifiers, humidifiers, and microwave ovens. In humidifiers and dehumidifiers, the humidistat is used where constant relative humidity conditions need to be maintained such as a refrigerator, greenhouse, or climate-controlled warehouse. When adjusting the controls in these applications the humidistat would be what is being set. In microwaves they are used in conjunction with smart cooking one-button features such as those for microwave popcorn. Humidistats employ hygrometers but are not the same. A humidistat has the functionality of a switch and is not just a measuring instrument like a hygrometer is.

For heating, ventilation, and air conditioning (HVAC) of buildings, humidistats or humidity sensors are used to sense the air relative humidity in the controlled space and turn on and off the HVAC equipment.
