= Lee–Kesler method =

Method to estimate saturated vapor pressure

The Lee–Kesler method allows the estimation of the saturated vapor pressure at a given temperature for all components for which the critical pressure P_{c}, the critical temperature T_{c}, and the acentric factor ω are known.

== Equations ==
$$\ln P_{\rm r} = f^{(0)} + \omega \cdot f^{(1)}$$

$$f^{(0)}=5.92714 - \frac{6.09648}{T_{\rm r}} - 1.28862 \cdot \ln T_{\rm r} + 0.169347 \cdot T_{\rm r}^6$$

$$f^{(1)}=15.2518 - \frac{15.6875}{T_{\rm r}}-13.4721 \cdot \ln T_{\rm r} + 0.43577 \cdot T_{\rm r}^6$$

with

$P_{\rm r}=\frac{P}{P_{\rm c}}$ (reduced pressure) and $T_{\rm r}=\frac{T}{T_{\rm c}}$ (reduced temperature).

== Typical errors ==
The prediction error can be up to 10% for polar components and small pressures and the calculated pressure is typically too low. For pressures above 1 bar, that means, above the normal boiling point, the typical errors are below 2%.

== Example calculation ==
For benzene with

- T_{c} = 562.12 K
- P_{c} = 4898 kPa
- T_{boiling} = 353.15 K
- ω = 0.2120

the following calculation for T = T_{b} results:

- T_{r} = 353.15 / 562.12 = 0.628247
- f^{(0)} = −3.167428
- f^{(1)} = −3.429560
- P_{r} = exp( f^{(0)} + ω f^{(1)} ) = 0.020354
- P = P_{r} · P_{c} = 99.69 kPa

The correct result would be P = 101.325 kPa, the normal (atmospheric) pressure. The deviation is −1.63 kPa or −1.61 %.

It is important to use the same absolute units for T and T_{c} as well as for P and P_{c}. The unit system used (K or R for T) is irrelevant because of the usage of the reduced values T_{r} and P_{r}.

== See also ==
- Vapour pressure of water
- Antoine equation
- Tetens equation
- Arden Buck equation
- Goff–Gratch equation
