= Vapor pressure of water =

Pressure exerted by molecules of water vapor in gaseous form

Vapor pressure of water (0–100 °C)
T, °C	T, °F	P, kPa	P, Torr	P, atm
0.01	32.018	0.611655	4.58779	0.00603656
5	41	0.872575	6.54485	0.00861165
10	50	1.22820	9.21225	0.0121214
15	59	1.70579	12.7945	0.0168349
20	68	2.33932	17.5463	0.0230873
25	77	3.16993	23.7764	0.0312848
30	86	4.24697	31.8549	0.0419143
35	95	5.62902	42.2211	0.0555541
40	104	7.38494	55.3916	0.0728837
45	113	9.59500	71.9684	0.0946953
50	122	12.3519	92.6472	0.121904
55	131	15.7621	118.225	0.155560
60	140	19.9464	149.611	0.196856
65	149	25.0416	187.827	0.247141
70	158	31.2009	234.026	0.307929
75	167	38.5954	289.489	0.380907
80	176	47.4145	355.638	0.467944
85	185	57.8670	434.038	0.571103
90	194	70.1818	526.407	0.692640
95	203	84.6085	634.616	0.835021
100	212	101.418	760.698	1.00092

The vapor pressure of water is the pressure exerted by molecules of water vapor in gaseous form (whether pure or in a mixture with other gases such as air). The saturation vapor pressure is the pressure at which water vapor is in thermodynamic equilibrium with its condensed state. At pressures higher than saturation vapor pressure, water will condense, while at lower pressures it will evaporate or sublimate. The saturation vapor pressure of water increases with increasing temperature and can be determined with the Clausius–Clapeyron relation. The boiling point of water is the temperature at which the saturated vapor pressure equals the ambient pressure. Water supercooled below its normal freezing point has a higher vapor pressure than that of ice at the same temperature and is, thus, unstable.

Calculations of the (saturation) vapor pressure of water are commonly used in meteorology. The temperature-vapor pressure relation inversely describes the relation between the boiling point of water and the pressure. This is relevant to both pressure cooking and cooking at high altitudes. An understanding of vapor pressure is also relevant in explaining high altitude breathing and cavitation.

== Approximation formulas ==
There are many published approximations for calculating saturated vapor pressure over water and over ice. Some of these are (in approximate order of increasing accuracy):

Name	Formula	Description
"Eq. 1" (August equation)	$P = \exp\left(20.386 - \frac{5132}{T}\right)$	P is the vapor pressure in mmHg and T is the temperature in kelvins. Constants are unattributed. This is of the form that would be derived from the Clausius-Clapeyron relation
The Antoine equation	$\log_{10}P = A - \frac{B}{C + T}$	T is in degrees Celsius (°C) and the vapor pressure P is in mmHg. The (unattributed) constants are given as: A / B / C / T_{min}, °C / T_{max}, °C; 8.07131 / 1730.63 / 233.426 / 1 / 99; 8.14019 / 1810.94 / 244.485 / 100 / 374
August-Roche-Magnus (or Magnus-Tetens or Magnus) equation	$P = 0.61094 \exp\left(\frac{17.625 T}{T + 243.04}\right)$	Temperature T is in °C and vapor pressure P is in kilopascals (kPa). The coefficients given here correspond to equation 21 in Alduchov and Eskridge (1996). See also discussion of Clausius-Clapeyron approximations used in meteorology and climatology.
Tetens equation	$P = 0.61078 \exp\left(\frac{17.27 T}{T + 237.3}\right)$	T is in °C and P is in kPa
The Buck equation.	$P = 0.61121 \exp \left(\left( 18.678 - \frac{T} {234.5}\right)\left( \frac{T} {257.14 + T} \right)\right)$	T is in °C and P is in kPa.
The Goff-Gratch (1946) equation.	(See article; too long)	
Wagner-Pruss saturation-pressure correlation (1992)	$$\begin{aligned} P = P_\text{c} \exp \left( \frac{T_\text{c}}{T} \right. & \left( -7.85951783 \tau + 1.84408259 \tau^{1.5} - 11.7866497 \tau^3 \right. \\ & \left. \left. + 22.6807411 \tau^{3.5} - 15.9618719 \tau^4 + 1.80122502 \tau^{7.5} \right) \right) \end{aligned}$$ where $\tau = 1 - \frac{T}{T_\text{c}}$	T and P refer to absolute temperature and pressure, respectively. $T_c = 647.096 ~\text{K}$ and $P_c = 22064 ~\text{kPa}$, referring to water's critical point.

=== Accuracy of different formulations ===
Here is a comparison of the accuracies of these different explicit formulations, showing saturation vapor pressures for liquid water in kPa, calculated at six temperatures with their percentage error from the table values of Lide (2005):

T (°C)	P (Lide Table)	P (Eq 1)	P (Antoine)	P (Magnus)	P (Tetens)	P (Buck)	P (Goff-Gratch)
0	0.6113	0.6593 (+7.85%)	0.6056 (-0.93%)	0.6109 (-0.06%)	0.6108 (-0.09%)	0.6112 (-0.01%)	0.6089 (-0.40%)
20	2.3388	2.3755 (+1.57%)	2.3296 (-0.39%)	2.3334 (-0.23%)	2.3382 (-0.03%)	2.3383 (-0.02%)	2.3355 (-0.14%)
35	5.6267	5.5696 (-1.01%)	5.6090 (-0.31%)	5.6176 (-0.16%)	5.6225 (-0.07%)	5.6268 (+0.00%)	5.6221 (-0.08%)
50	12.344	12.065 (-2.26%)	12.306 (-0.31%)	12.361 (+0.13%)	12.336 (-0.06%)	12.349 (+0.04%)	12.338 (-0.05%)
75	38.563	37.738 (-2.14%)	38.463 (-0.26%)	39.000 (+1.13%)	38.646 (+0.21%)	38.595 (+0.08%)	38.555 (-0.02%)
100	101.32	101.31 (-0.01%)	101.34 (+0.02%)	104.077 (+2.72%)	102.21 (+0.88%)	101.31 (-0.01%)	101.32 (0.00%)

A more detailed discussion of accuracy and considerations of the inaccuracy in temperature measurements is presented in Alduchov and Eskridge (1996). The analysis here shows the simple unattributed formula and the Antoine equation are reasonably accurate at 100 °C, but quite poor for lower temperatures above freezing. Tetens is much more accurate over the range from 0 to 50 °C and very competitive at 75 °C, but Antoine's is superior at 75 °C and above. The unattributed formula must have zero error at around 26 °C, but is of very poor accuracy outside a narrow range. Tetens' equations are generally much more accurate and arguably more straightforward for use at everyday temperatures (e.g., in meteorology). As expected, Buck's equation for T > 0 °C is significantly more accurate than Tetens, and its superiority increases markedly above 50 °C, though it is more complicated to use. The Buck equation is even superior to the more complex Goff-Gratch equation over the range needed for practical meteorology.

== Numerical approximations ==
For serious computation, Lowe (1977) developed two pairs of equations for temperatures above and below freezing, with different levels of accuracy. They are very accurate (compared to Clausius-Clapeyron and Goff-Gratch) but use nested polynomials for efficient computation. However, there are more recent reviews of possibly superior formulations, notably Wexler (1976, 1977), reported by Flatau et al. (1992).

Examples of modern use of these formulae can additionally be found in NASA's GISS Model-E and Seinfeld and Pandis (2006). The former is an extremely simple Antoine equation, while the latter is a polynomial.

In 2018 a new physics-inspired approximation formula was devised and tested by Huang who also reviews other recent attempts.

== Graphical pressure dependency on temperature ==
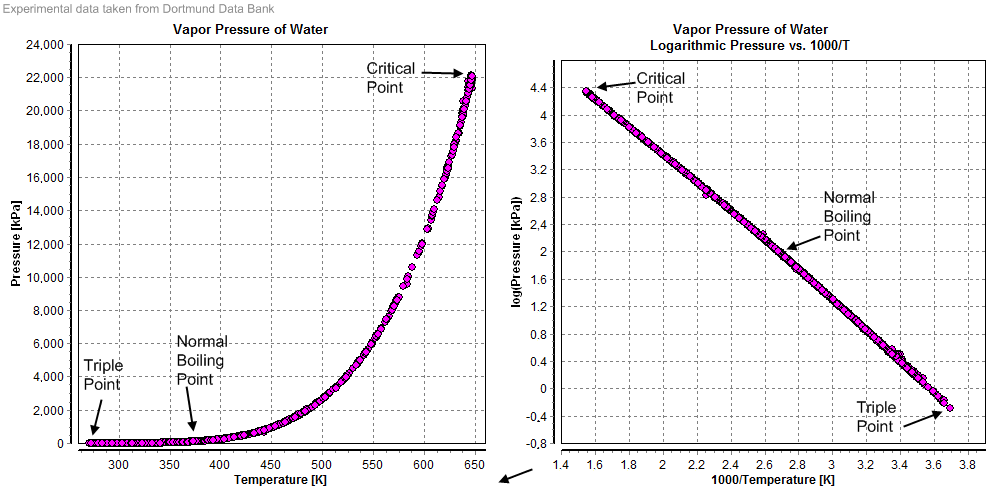
Vapor pressure diagrams of water; data taken from Dortmund Data Bank. Graphics shows triple point, critical point and boiling point of water.

== See also ==
- Dew point
- Gas laws
- Lee–Kesler method
- Molar mass
