= Goff–Gratch equation =

Equation estimating vapor pressure of water

The Goff–Gratch equation is one (arguably the first reliable in history) amongst many experimental correlations proposed to estimate the saturation water vapor pressure at a given temperature.

Another similar equation based on more recent data is the Arden Buck equation.

== Historical note ==
This equation is named after the authors of the original scientific article who described how to calculate the saturation water vapor pressure above a flat free water surface as a function of temperature (Goff and Gratch, 1946). According to the Smithsonian Meteorological Tables, the formula was adopted in Resolution 164 of the Twelfth Conference of Directors of the International Meteorological Organization (Washington, 1947). Goff (1957) later revised his formula, and the latter was recommended for use by the World Meteorological Organization in 1988, with further corrections in 2000.

The Guide to Meteorological Instruments and Methods of Observation a.k.a. CIMO-Guide (WMO-No. 8) contains the much simpler Magnus formula (p.197). For temperatures below ‑45 °C for liquid water or ‑65 °C for ice, the CIMO-Guide recommends formulations from Sonntag (1990,1994).

== Experimental correlation ==
The original Goff–Gratch (1945) experimental correlation reads as follows:

$\log\ e^*\ =$	$-7.90298(T_\mathrm{st}/T-1)\ +\ 5.02808\ \log(T_\mathrm{st}/T)$
	$-\ 1.3816\times10^{-7}(10^{11.344(1-T/T_\mathrm{st})}-1)$
	$+\ 8.1328\times10^{-3}(10^{-3.49149(T_\mathrm{st}/T-1)}-1)\ +\ \log\ e^*_\mathrm{st}$

where:

log refers to the logarithm in base 10
e^{*} is the saturation water vapor pressure (hPa)
T is the absolute air temperature in kelvins
T_{st} is the steam-point (i.e. boiling point at 1 atm.) temperature (373.15 K)
e^{*}_{st} is e^{*} at the steam-point pressure (1 atm = 1013.25 hPa)

Similarly, the correlation for the saturation water vapor pressure over ice is:

$\log\ e^*_i\ =$	$-9.09718(T_0/T-1)\ -\ 3.56654\ \log(T_0/T)$
	$+\ 0.876793(1-T/T_0) +\ \log\ e^*_{i0}$

where:

log stands for the logarithm in base 10
e^{*}_{i} is the saturation water vapor pressure over ice (hPa)
T is the air temperature (K)
T_{0} is the ice-point (triple point) temperature (273.16 K)
e^{*}_{i0} is e^{*} at the ice-point pressure (6.1173 hPa)

== See also ==
- Vapour pressure of water
- Antoine equation
- Arden Buck equation
- Tetens equation
- Lee–Kesler method
