= Ernst Ferdinand August =

German physicist

- Born: 18 February 1795; Prenzlau, Brandenburg, Germany
- Died: 25 March 1870 (aged 75); Prussia, German Empire
- Known for: Psychrometrics, Psychrometer
- Scientific career
- Fields: Physics

Ernst Ferdinand August (18 February 1795 – 25 March 1870) was a German physicist and meteorologist. He developed and improved a number of physics related devices, among them the psychrometer, which was named after him.

== Biography ==
In his childhood, August was initially taken on by a poor foster family. From 1805 he attended the Evangelisches Gymnasium zum Grauen Kloster school in Berlin. Among others he was instructed by Ernst Gottfried Fischer in math and physics and graduated in 1813. From 1815 he fought in German campaign of 1813. After the war he studied philosophy and theology and became a senior teacher in the Gymnasium zum Grauen Kloster. in 1821 he transferred to Joachimsthal Gymnasium. In 1823 he married the daughter of his former teacher and later colleague Ernst Gottfried Fischer, the same year he also received his doctorate with a dissertation on conic sections.

In 1827 he became headmaster of the newly built Cologne Gymnasium and remained in this position until his death in 1870. At that time he developed a number of devices, among them the heliostat, skiostat, and psychrometer.

== Contributions to hydrometry ==
With the inventions of the hygrometer and thermometer, the theories of combining the two began to emerge during the sixteenth and seventeenth centuries. In 1818 Ernst patented the term "psychrometer", from the Greek language meaning "cold measure". The psychrometer is a hygrometric instrument based on the principle that dry air enhances evaporation, unlike wet air, which slows it.
