= Leaf wetness =

Leaf wetness is a meteorological parameter that describes the amount of dew and precipitation left on vegetation. It is used for monitoring leaf moisture for agricultural purposes, such as fungus and disease control, for control of irrigation systems, and for detection of fog and dew conditions, and early detection of rainfall.

Leaf wetness may be measured by various means:

- By change in electrical resistance between two metal conductors in an alternate finger or double spiral configuration on a flat surface, either flat or cylindrical. The conductors are usually gold plated for corrosion resistance. An issue with this method is that measurements depend on droplets being large enough to bridge the gap between the conductors. A surface coating of for instance hygroscopic latex paint may be applied for more consistent results. Resistance measurement is often by alternating current excitation.
- By measuring the change in the dielectric constant of the surface of a sensor, thus detecting the presence of water or ice on the sensor's surface.
- A sensor with hygroscopic properties where a change in sensor length or weight can be measured mechanically.

== See also ==
- Hygrometer
- Moisture analysis
- Dewcell
