= Kam Controls =

Kam Controls Incorporated
- Type: Private
- Industry: Oil and gas, Measurement instruments
- Founded: 1983
- Headquarters: Houston, Texas, United States
- Area served: Worldwide
- Key people: Kam Mohajer (President)
- Products: KAM Ultrasonic Flow Meter, KF Karl Fisher Moisture Analyzer, Oil Water Detector
- Website: Kam.com

Kam Controls Incorporated is an R&D company based in Houston, Texas, United States manufacturing measurement instruments for producers and pipeline operators in the petroleum industry. The company manufactures instruments to be used in downstream, midstream and upstream operations in the petroleum industry, used in aviation, laboratory, marine, pipeline, production, refinery, storage and truck applications, including water in oil and interface detectors, turbidity and moisture analyzers, samplers and static mixers. The company is also a supplier for the oil shale production companies in the Eagle Ford and Marcellus Shale Plays.

== History ==
Kam Controls was founded in 1983 when ExxonMobil approached company founder Kam Mohajer to design an instrument to measure the volume of oil in marine offloading that would be unaffected by sediment. In response, the KAM UFM Ultrasonic Flow Meter was designed with no moving parts

The second product to be introduced was the KAM KF Karl Fischer Moisture Analyzer, a Karl Fischer titrator for hydrocarbons.

== FAME measurement ==
In May 2010, Kam Controls announced that it had successfully tested the Kam FAME Meter, an instrument to measure the Fatty acid methyl ester (FAME) amount in jetfuel. This development followed Directive 2003/30/EC implemented in EU member states, which mandates addition of 5% FAME in automotive diesel fuel. However, the international specification for FAME in jetfuel is 5ppm or less, with 30ppm for restricted usage. Due to the presence of multi-fuel transport and distribution facilities, this raised concerns in the aviation industry including aircraft engine manufacturers. The company founder and President Kam Mohajer claimed that tests were conducted in the 100, 200, 300, and 500ppm range. According to Mohajer, the instrument was able to measure FAME concentrations from 1ppm and higher.

== Patents and Inventions ==
KAM Controls has made contributions to the Petroleum Industry through the invention of various measuring and mixing solutions. They have registered patents for two of their instruments: The KAM OWD Oil Water Detector and the KAM SMP Static Mixing Plate.
