= Food moisture analysis =

Food moisture analysis is the determination of the concentration of water in a food sample. A variety of techniques may be used including Karl Fischer titration and loss on drying. Many technical standards exist which define test methods for determining moisture in different types of food.

Food moisture content can impact food safety, food quality, shelf life, texture, legal compliance, and consumer acceptance.

== Bibliography ==
1. Pearson, D (1973), Laboratory Techniques in Food Analysis, Butterworth & Co Ltd, London, first edition, 315p.
2. Suzanne Nielsen, S. (2010), Food Analysis, Springer, Fourth edition, 602p.
3. James, C.S., (1996). Analytical chemistry Foods, New York, Blackie Academics and professional
