= Hygrometer =

Instrument for measuring humidity

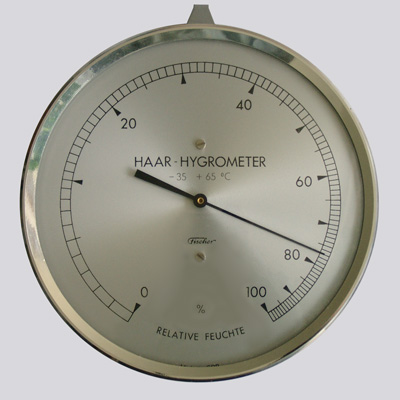
A hair tension dial hygrometer with a nonlinear scale.

A hygrometer is an instrument that measures humidity, that is, how much water vapor is present in the air. Humidity measurement instruments usually rely on measurements of some other quantities, such as temperature, pressure, mass, and mechanical or electrical changes in a substance as moisture is absorbed. By calibration and calculation, these measured quantities can be used to indicate the humidity. Modern electronic devices use the temperature of condensation (called the dew point), or they sense changes in electrical capacitance or resistance.

The maximum amount of water vapor that can be present in a given volume (at saturation) varies greatly with temperature; at low temperatures a lower mass of water per unit volume can remain as vapor than at high temperatures. Thus a change in the temperature changes the relative humidity.

A prototype hygrometer was invented by Leonardo da Vinci in 1480. Major improvements occurred during the 1600s; Francesco Folli invented a more practical version of the device, and Robert Hooke improved a number of meteorological devices, including the hygrometer. A more modern version was created by Swiss polymath Johann Heinrich Lambert in 1755. Later, in the year 1783, Swiss physicist and geologist Horace Bénédict de Saussure invented a hygrometer that uses a stretched human hair as its sensor.

In the late 17th century, some scientists called humidity-measuring instruments hygroscopes; that word is no longer in use, but hygroscopic and hygroscopy, which derive from it, still are.

== Classical hygrometer ==
=== Ancient hygrometers ===
Crude hygrometers were devised and developed during the Shang dynasty in Ancient China to study weather. The Chinese used a bar of charcoal and a lump of earth: its dry weight was taken, then compared with its damp weight after being exposed in the air. The differences in weight were used to tally the humidity level.

Other techniques were applied using mass to measure humidity, such as when the air was dry, the bar of charcoal would be light, while when the air was humid, the bar of charcoal would be heavy. By hanging a lump of earth on one end of a staff and a bar of charcoal on the other end and attaching a fixed lifting string to the middle point to make the staff horizontal in dry air, an ancient hygrometer was made.

=== Metal-paper coil type ===
The metal-paper coil hygrometer is very useful for giving a dial indication of humidity changes. It appears most often in inexpensive devices, and its accuracy is limited, with variations of 10% or more. In these devices, water vapor is absorbed by a salt-impregnated paper strip attached to a metal coil, causing the coil to change shape. These changes (analogous to those in a bimetallic thermometer) cause an indication on a dial. There is usually a metal needle on the front of the gauge that points to a scale.

=== Hair tension hygrometers ===
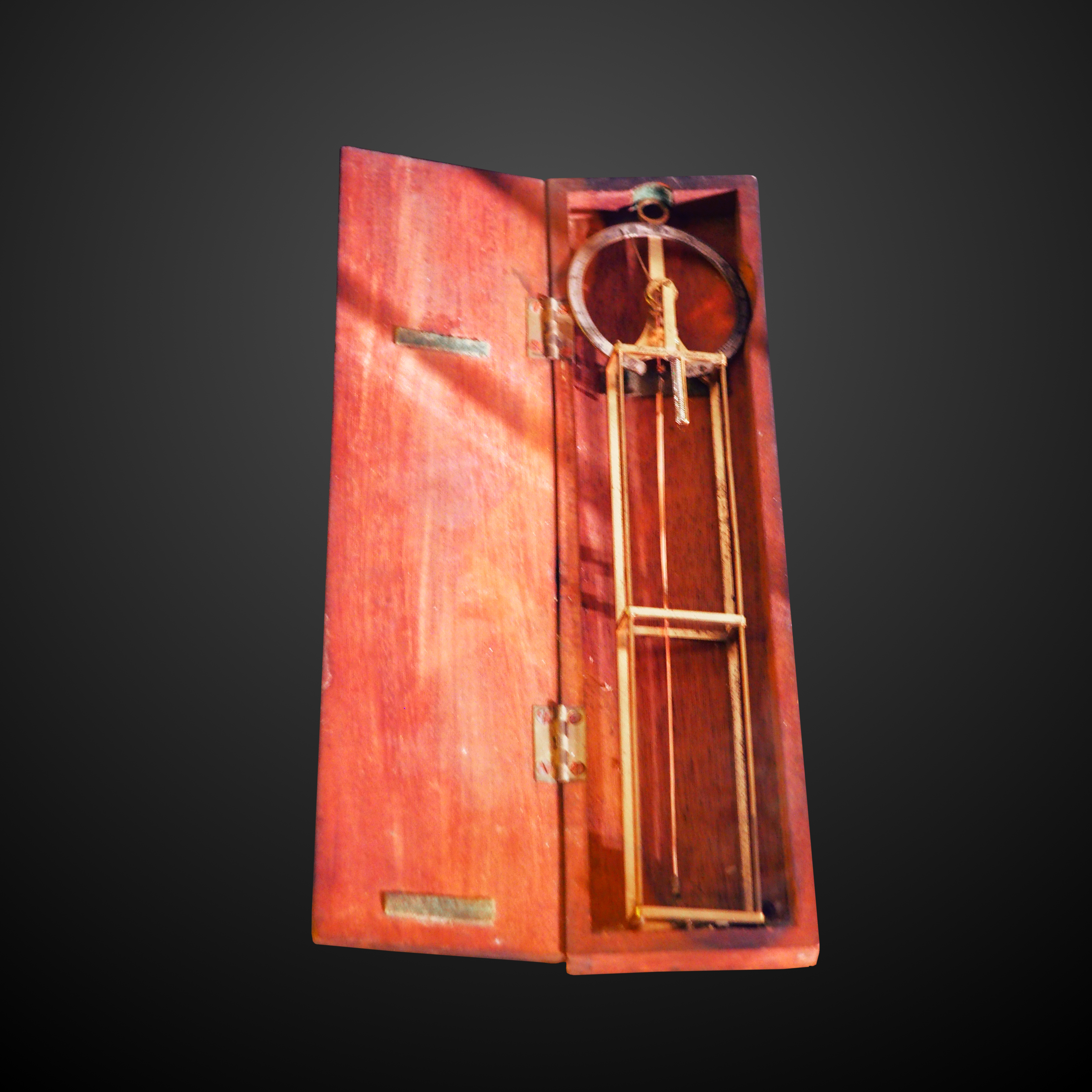
Deluc's hair tension whalebone hygrometer (MHS Geneva)

These devices use a human or animal hair under some tension. (Whalebone and other materials may be used in place of hair.) The hair is hygroscopic (tending toward retaining moisture); its length changes with humidity, and the length change may be magnified by a mechanism and indicated on a dial or scale. Swiss physicist and geologist Horace Bénédict de Saussure was the first to build such a hygrometer, in 1783. The traditional folk art device known as a weather house also works on this principle.

It consists of a human hair eight or ten inches [20 or 25 cm] long, b c, Fig. 37, fastened at one extremity to a screw, a, and at the other passing over a pulley, c, being strained tight by a silk thread and weight, d.

— John William Draper, A Textbook on Chemistry (1861)

The pulley is connected to an index which moves over a graduated scale (e). The instrument can be made more sensitive by removing oils from the hair, such as by first soaking the hair in diethyl ether.

=== Psychrometer (wet-and-dry-bulb thermometer) ===
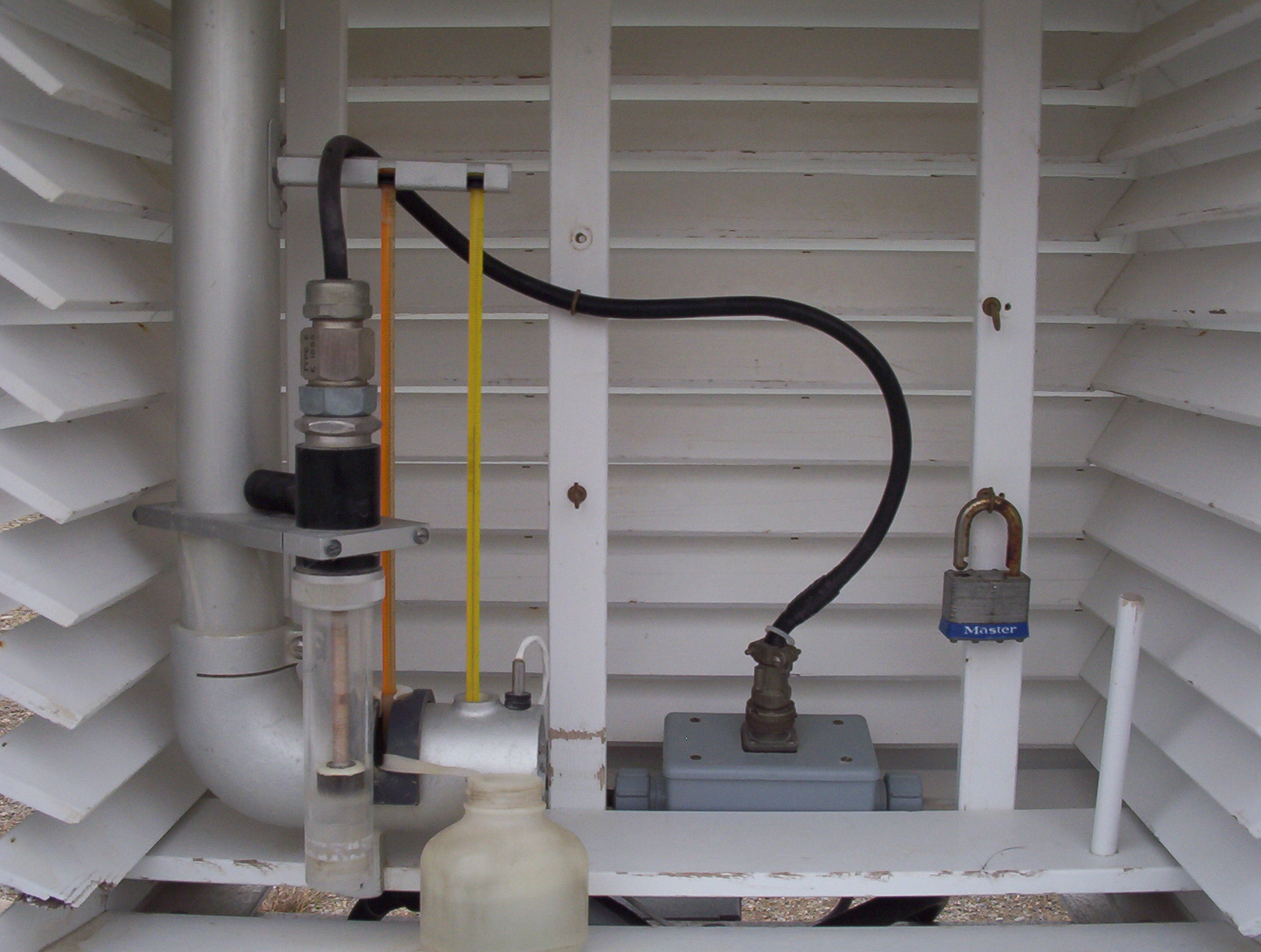
The interior of a Stevenson screen showing a motorized psychrometer

A psychrometer, or a wet and dry-bulb thermometer, consists of two calibrated thermometers, one that is dry and one that is kept moist with distilled water on a sock or wick. At temperatures above the freezing point of water, evaporation of water from the wick lowers the temperature, such that the wet-bulb thermometer will be at a lower temperature than that of the dry-bulb thermometer. When the air temperature is below freezing, however, the wet-bulb must be covered with a thin coating of ice, in order to be accurate. As a result of the heat of sublimation, the wet-bulb temperature will eventually be lower than the dry bulb, although this may take many minutes of continued use of the psychrometer.

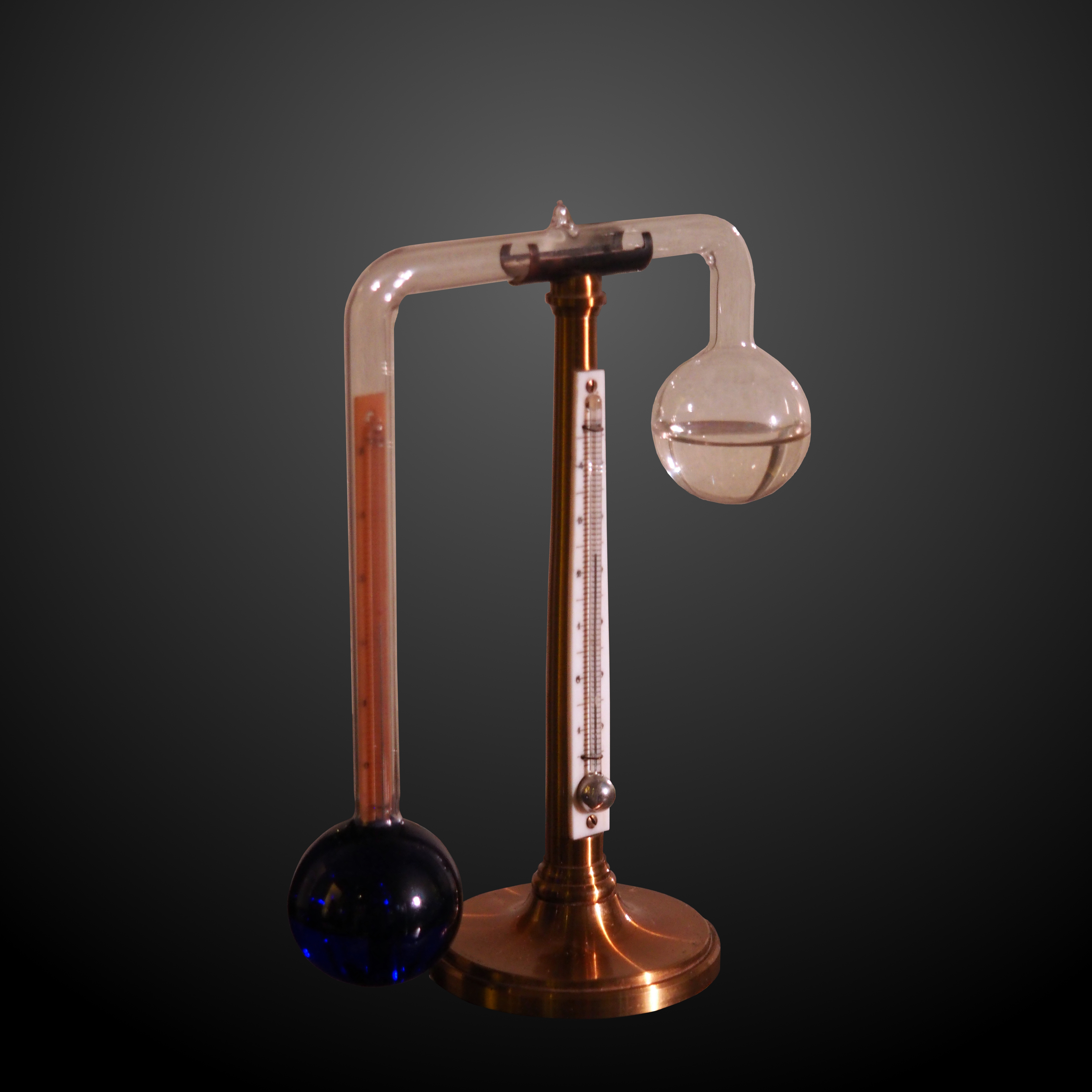
Psychrometer probably made in Switzerland circa 1850 by Kappeller (MHS Geneva)

Relative humidity (RH) is computed from the ambient temperature, shown by the dry-bulb thermometer and the difference in temperatures as shown by the wet-bulb and dry-bulb thermometers. Relative humidity can also be determined by locating the intersection of the wet and dry-bulb temperatures on a psychrometric chart. The dry and wet thermometers coincide when the air is fully saturated, and the greater the difference the drier the air. Psychrometers are commonly used in meteorology, and in the heating, ventilation, and air conditioning (HVAC) industry for proper refrigerant charging of residential and commercial air conditioning systems.

==== Sling psychrometer ====
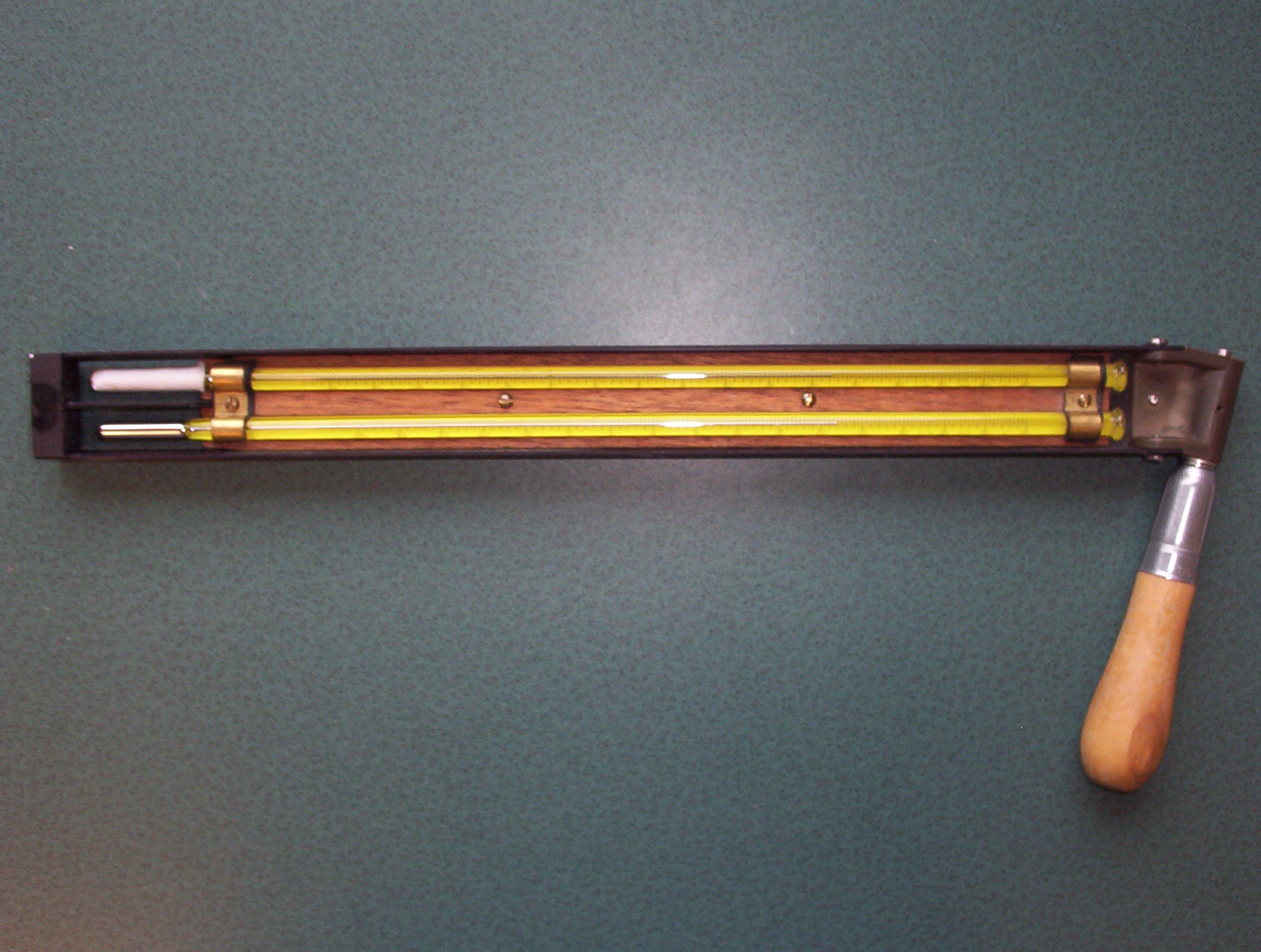
A sling psychrometer for outdoor use

A sling psychrometer, which uses thermometers attached to a handle, is manually spun in free air flow until both temperatures stabilize. This is sometimes used for field measurements but is being replaced by more convenient electronic sensors. A whirling psychrometer uses the same principle, but the two thermometers are fitted into a device that resembles a ratchet or football rattle.

=== Chilled mirror dew point hygrometer ===
Dew point is the temperature at which a sample of moist air (or any other water vapor) at constant pressure reaches water vapor saturation. At this saturation temperature, further cooling results in condensation of water. Chilled mirror dewpoint hygrometers are some of the most precise instruments commonly available. They use a chilled mirror and optoelectronic mechanism to detect condensation on the mirror's surface. The temperature of the mirror is controlled by electronic feedback to maintain a dynamic equilibrium between evaporation and condensation, thus closely measuring the dew point temperature. An accuracy of 0.2 °C is attainable with these devices, which correlates at typical office environments to a relative humidity accuracy of about ±1.2%. Older chilled-mirrors used a metallic mirror that needed cleaning and skilled labor. Newer implementations of chilled-mirrors use highly polished surfaces that do not require routine cleaning.

More recently, spectroscopic chilled-mirrors have been introduced. Using this method, the dew point is determined with spectroscopic light detection which ascertains the nature of the condensation. This method avoids many of the pitfalls of the previous chilled-mirrors and is capable of operating drift free.

Chilled-mirrors remain the reference measurement for calibration of other hygrometers. This is due to their fundamental first-principle nature that refers to the core of condensation physics and measures temperature, which is one of the base quantities of the International System of Quantities (length, time, amount of substance, electric current, temperature, luminous intensity, mass).

== Modern hygrometers ==
=== Capacitive ===
When cost, space, or fragility are important, other types of electronic sensors are used, at the price of lower accuracy. Capacitive hygrometers measure the effect of humidity on the dielectric constant of a polymer or a metal oxide. When calibrated, their accuracy at relative humidities between 5% and 95% is ±2% RH; uncalibrated, this is two to three times worse. Capacitive sensors are robust against effects such as condensation and temporary high temperatures, but subject to contamination, drift and aging effects. They are, however, suitable for many applications.

=== Resistive ===
In resistive hygrometers, the change in electrical resistance of a material due to humidity is measured. Typical materials are salts and conductive polymers. Resistive sensors are less sensitive than capacitive sensors – the change in material properties is less, so they require more complex circuitry. The material properties also tend to depend both on humidity and temperature, which means in practice that the sensor must be combined with a temperature sensor. The accuracy and robustness against condensation vary depending on the chosen resistive material. Robust, condensation-resistant sensors exist with an accuracy of up to ±3% RH (relative humidity).

=== Thermal ===
In thermal hygrometers, the change in thermal conductivity of air due to humidity is measured. These sensors measure absolute humidity rather than relative humidity.

=== Gravimetric ===
A gravimetric hygrometer extracts the water from the air (or other gas) and weighs it separately, for example by weighing a desiccant before and after it has absorbed the water. The temperature, pressure and volume of the resulting dry gas are also measured, providing enough information to calculate the amount of water per mole of gas.

This is considered the most accurate primary method of measuring absolute humidity, and national standards based on it have been developed in US, UK, EU and Japan. However, the inconvenience of using such devices means they are usually only used to calibrate less accurate instruments, called Transfer Standards.

=== Optical ===
An optical hygrometer measures the absorption of light by water in the air. A light emitter and a light detector are arranged with a volume of air between them. The attenuation of the light, as seen by the detector, indicates the humidity, according to the Beer–Lambert law. Types include the Lyman-alpha hygrometer (using Lyman-alpha light emitted by hydrogen), the krypton hygrometer (using 123.58 nm light emitted by krypton), and the differential absorption hygrometer (using light emitted by two lasers operating at different wavelengths, one absorbed by humidity and the other not).

== Applications ==
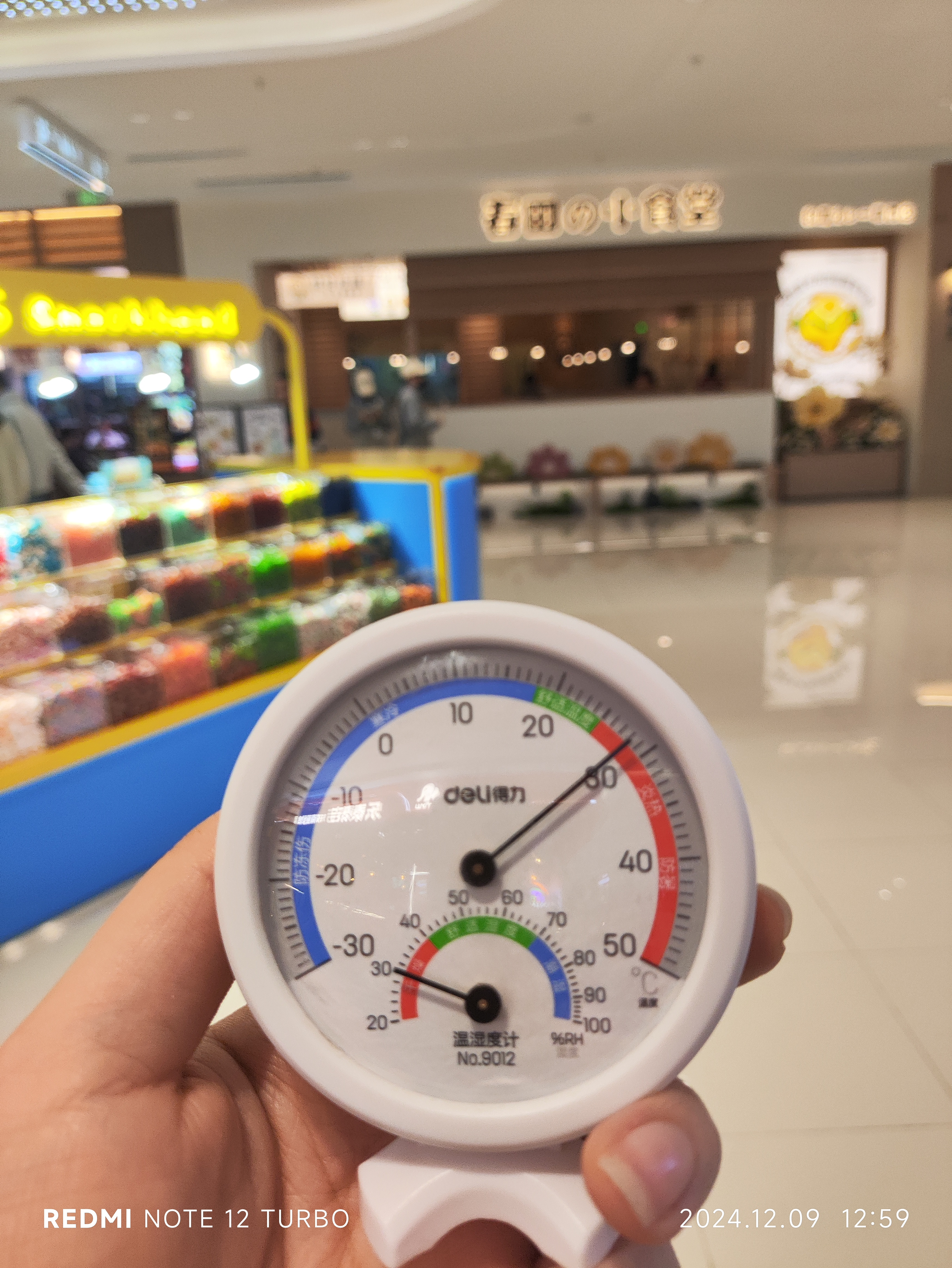
Application of portable thermometer and hygrometer

Aside from greenhouses and industrial spaces, hygrometers are also used in some incubators, saunas, humidors and museums. They are also used in the care of wooden musical instruments such as pianos, guitars, violins, and harps which can be damaged by improper humidity conditions. Hygrometers play a big part in firefighting as the lower the relative humidity, the more vigorously fuels may burn. In residential settings, hygrometers are used to assist in humidity control (too low humidity can damage human skin and body, while too high humidity favors growth of mildew and dust mite). Hygrometers are also used in the coating industry because the application of paint and other coatings may be very sensitive to humidity and dew point.

== Difficulty of accurate humidity measurement ==
Humidity measurement is among the most difficult problems in basic metrology. According to the WMO Guide, "The achievable accuracies [for humidity determination] listed in the table refer to good quality instruments that are well operated and maintained. In practice, these are not easy to achieve." Two thermometers can be compared by immersing them both in an insulated vessel of water (or alcohol, for temperatures below the freezing point of water) and stirring vigorously to minimize temperature variations. A high-quality liquid-in-glass thermometer if handled with care should remain stable for some years. Hygrometers must be calibrated in air, which is a much less effective heat transfer medium than is water, and many types are subject to drift so need regular recalibration. A further difficulty is that most hygrometers sense relative humidity rather than the absolute amount of water present, but relative humidity is a function of both temperature and absolute moisture content, so small temperature variations within the air in a test chamber will translate into relative humidity variations.

In a cold and humid environment, ice may sublimate on the sensor head, whether it is a hair, dew cell, mirror, capacitance sensing element, or dry-bulb thermometer of an aspiration psychrometer. The ice on the probe matches the reading to the saturation humidity with respect to ice at that temperature, i.e. the frost point. However, a conventional hygrometer is unable to measure properly under the frost point, and the only way to go around this fundamental problem is to use a heated humidity probe.

== Calibration standards ==
=== Psychrometer calibration ===
Accurate calibration of the thermometers used is fundamental to precise humidity determination by the wet-dry method. The thermometers must be protected from radiant heat and must have a sufficiently high flow of air over the wet bulb for the most accurate results. One of the most precise types of wet-dry bulb psychrometer was invented in the late 19th century by Adolph Richard Assmann (1845–1918); in English-language references the device is usually spelled "Assmann psychrometer." In this device, each thermometer is suspended within a vertical tube of polished metal, and that tube is in turn suspended within a second metal tube of slightly larger diameter; these double tubes serve to isolate the thermometers from radiant heating. Air is drawn through the tubes with a fan that is driven by a clockwork mechanism to ensure a consistent speed (some modern versions use an electric fan with electronic speed control). According to Middleton, 1966, "an essential point is that air is drawn between the concentric tubes, as well as through the inner one."

It is very challenging, particularly at low relative humidity, to obtain the maximal theoretical depression of the wet-bulb temperature; an Australian study in the late 1990s found that liquid-in-glass wet-bulb thermometers were warmer than theory predicted even when considerable precautions were taken; these could lead to RH value readings that are 2 to 5 percent points too high.

One solution sometimes used for accurate humidity measurement when the air temperature is below freezing is to use a thermostatically controlled electric heater to raise the temperature of outside air to above freezing. In this arrangement, a fan draws outside air past (1) a thermometer to measure the ambient dry-bulb temperature, (2) the heating element, (3) a second thermometer to measure the dry-bulb temperature of the heated air, then finally (4) a wet-bulb thermometer. According to the World Meteorological Organization Guide, "The principle of the heated psychrometer is that the water vapor content of an air mass does not change if it is heated. This property may be exploited to the advantage of the psychrometer by avoiding the need to maintain an ice bulb under freezing conditions.".

Since the humidity of the ambient air is calculated indirectly from three temperature measurements, in such a device accurate thermometer calibration is even more important than for a two-bulb configuration.

=== Saturated salt calibration ===
Various researchers have investigated the use of saturated salt solutions for calibrating hygrometers. Slushy mixtures of certain pure salts and distilled water have the property that they maintain an approximately constant humidity in a closed container. A saturated table salt (sodium chloride) bath will eventually give a reading of approximately 75%. Other salts have other equilibrium humidity levels: Lithium chloride ~11%; Magnesium chloride ~33%; Potassium carbonate ~43%; Potassium sulfate ~97%. Salt solutions will vary somewhat in humidity with temperature and they can take relatively long times to come to equilibrium, but their ease of use compensates somewhat for these disadvantages in low precision applications, such as checking mechanical and electronic hygrometers.

== See also ==
- Automated airport weather station
- Dewcell
- Weather friar
- Humidistat
- Moisture analysis
- Soil moisture sensor
- Moisture meter
