= Weather friar =

Hair-tension hygrometer

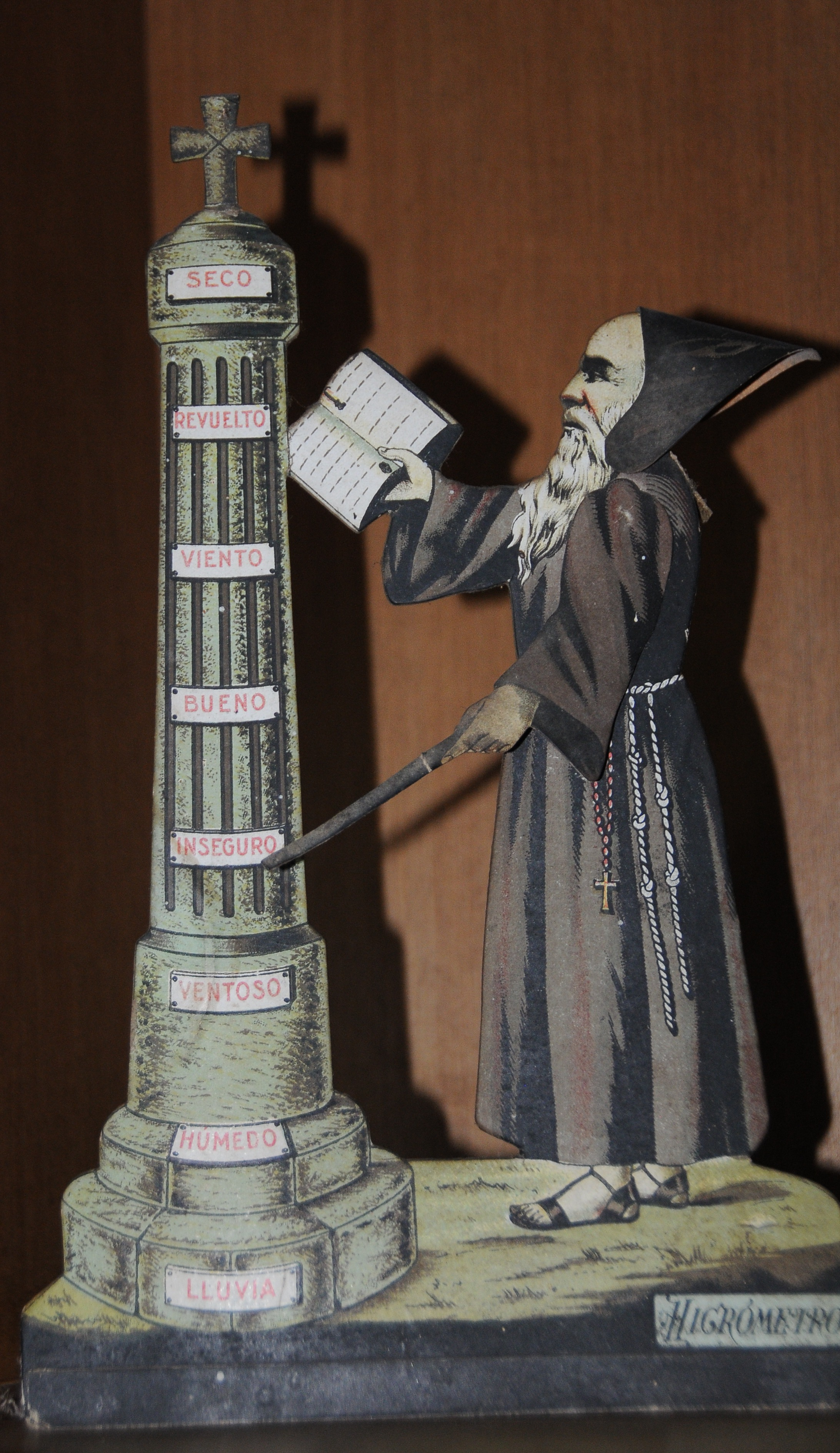
Weather friar (original model).

The Weather friar (Catalan language, Frare del temps), is an absorption hygrometer created by Agapito Borràs Pedemonte in 1894.

== History ==
=== Origin ===
Borràs a native of Calella, constructed the Weather friar, when he was barely 18 years old in 1894 after studying several books on recreational physics, giving this and other gadgets made by him to his friends; The Weather friar caught the attention of some businessmen from Arenys de Mar, who convinced Borràs to market it for an initial price of 80 pesetas, this being the seed of one of the most famous toy companies in Spain : Juguetes Borrás . This company would finally merge with Educa Sallent in 2001, creating the new brand Educa Borrás, although the Weather friar was left out of the merger, which is why today the company in charge of its manufacturing and distribution is Tot Ideas S.L., founded by Borràs around 1906 in Mataró, a place where he had moved, taking advantage of the commercial boom derived from the Barcelona-Mataró railway line, the first inaugurated in European-Spain (the first in colonial-Spain, was in Cuba). Currently the company is directed by Enric Borrás, great-grandson of Agapito Borràs, and sells about 40,000 Weather friars around the world (mainly Spain, France, Italy, Portugal and even in Malta ) at a price of approximately 24 euros.

=== Precedents ===
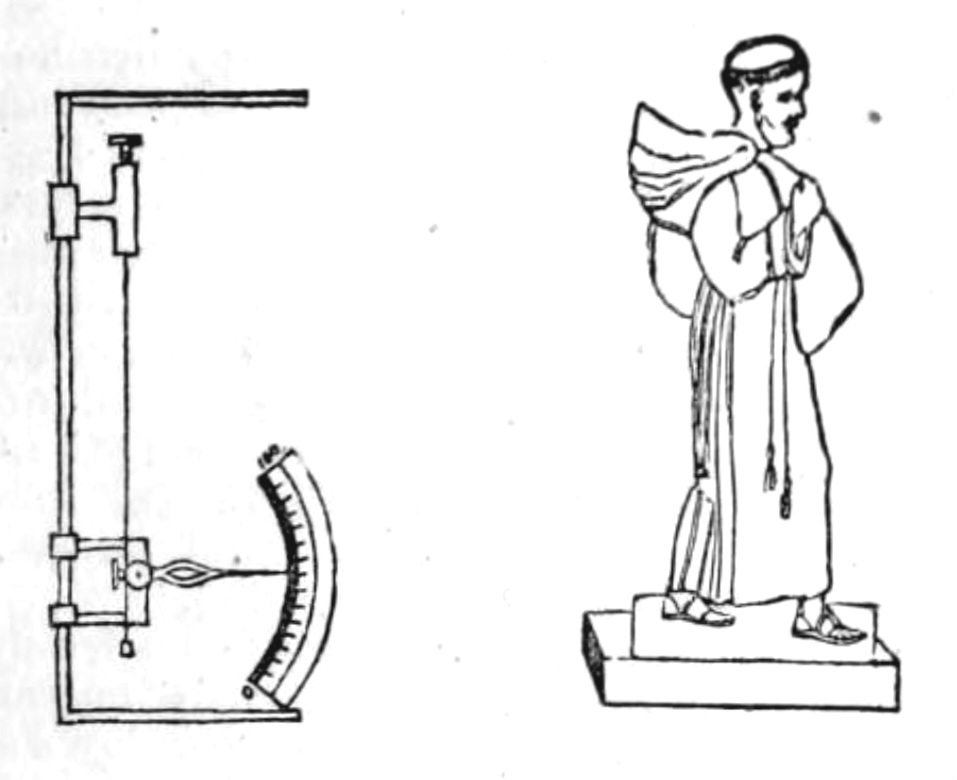
Illustration of the Babinet hygrometer and of the Capuchin friar in Maison rustique du XIXe siècle, Encyclopédie d'Agriculture pratique (1842).

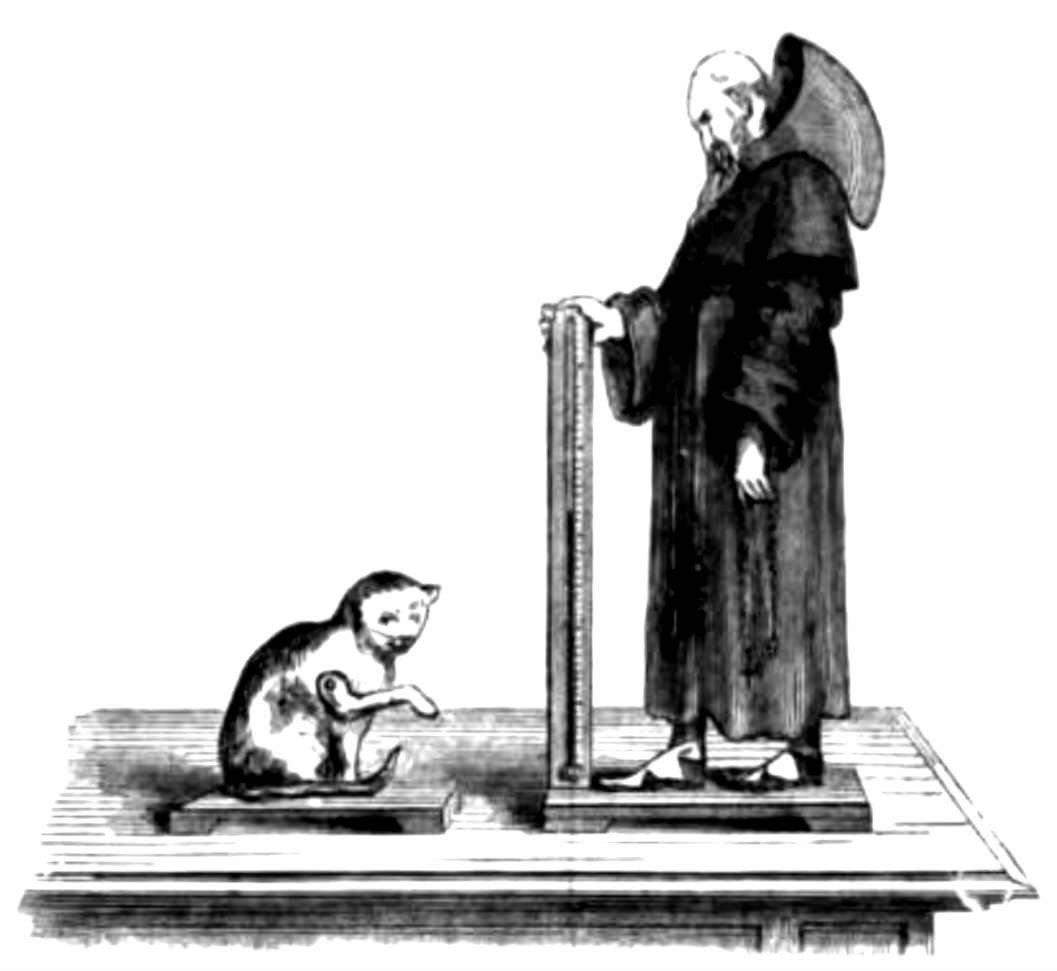
Illustration of two hygrometers representing a cat and a monk in L'air et le monde aérien (1865).

Although "the Weather friar" has been sometimes wrongly cited as the oldest hygrometer-meteorologist in the world, there is a similar hygrometer, with the shape of a Capuchin friar as well, from the late 18th century, in the Museum of Arts and Crafts in Paris, built by Charles Alexandre Clair and belonging to the physics office of Jacques Charles, who would bequeath his collection of gadgets to the State on January 15, 1792, with the National Assembly preparing an inventory of it where the existence of this object, very popular circa 1842, according to the first volume of the book Maison rustique du XIXe siècle, Encyclopédie d'Agriculture pratique, published under the direction of the scientific popularizer Charles-François Bailly de Merlieux, where a hygrometer is also mentioned in which the image of a Turk moves a saber to indicate the weather, similar to the friar moving the pointer and the hood of the habit. Similarly, at the Palaiseau Polytechnic School there is a hair hygrometer from 1809 in which a female figure moves her right arm to indicate on a scale the amount of water vapor in the air, dating the use of human hair to measure humidity to the year 1775, when Horace-Bénédict de Saussure decided has used it to develop what is considered the first precise hygrometer (perfected in 1824 by Jacques Babinet with a microscopic reading system). By the way, Santorio Santorio had already described a thread hygrometer in 1623. Likewise, an illustration of two hygrometers represented respectively by the figures of a monk and a cat stands out in Arthur Mangin's book L'air et le monde aérien (1865), both described as popular hygrometers. There was a clear tendency in the xix century to have hygrometers with decorative drawings in homes, especially in rural areas as an aid to the peasantry's work.

== Description ==
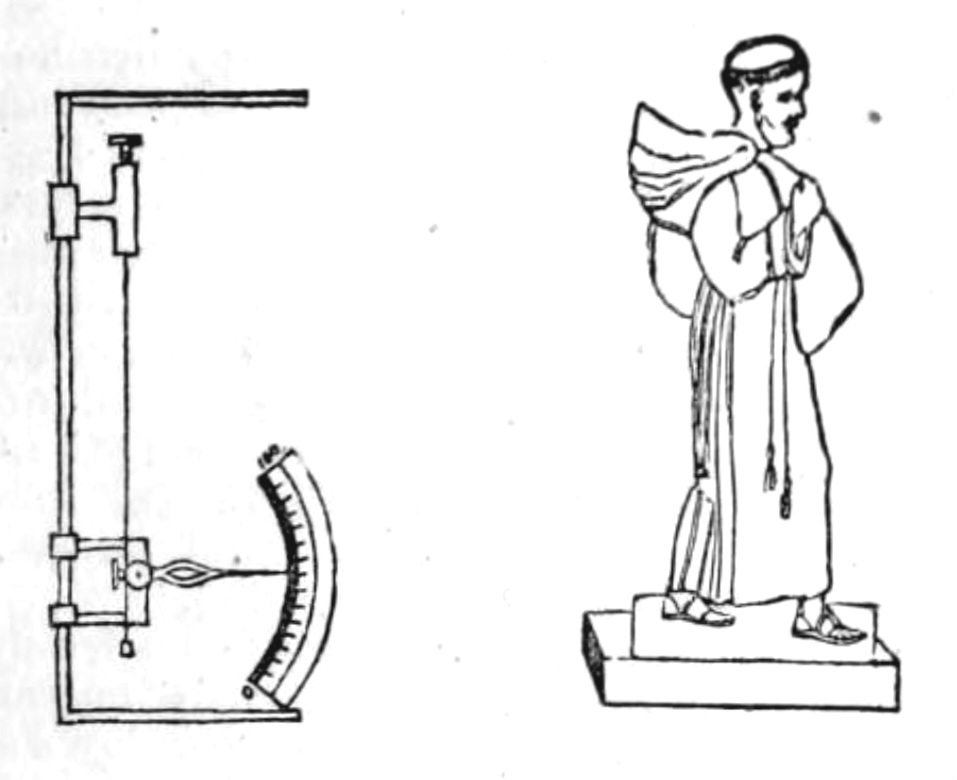
Illustration of the Babinet hygrometer and of the Capuchin friar in Maison rustique du XIXe siècle, Encyclopédie d'Agriculture pratique (1842).

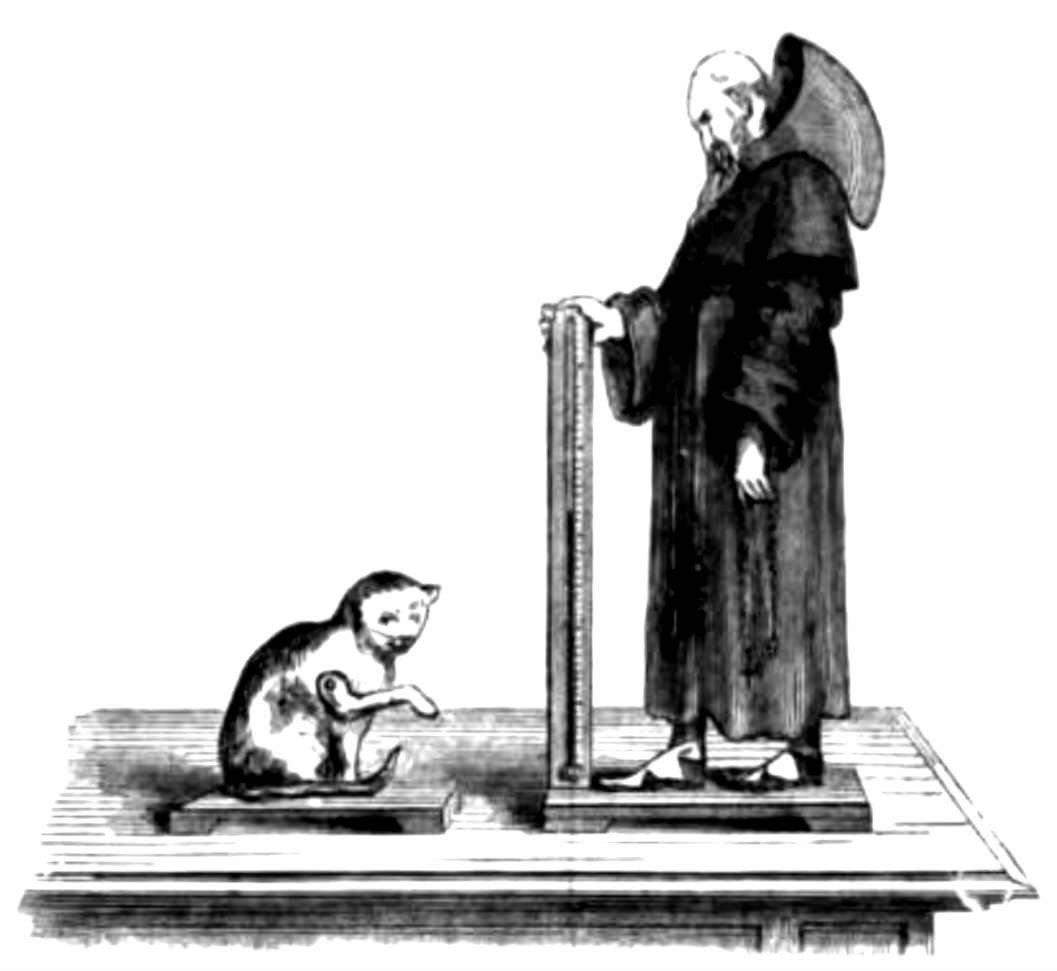
Illustration of two hygrometers representative of a cat and a monk in L'air et le monde aérien (1865).

The hygrometer, made of cardboard, shows a figure consisting of a friar of the Capuchin Order with an open book in his right hand and the left arm and the hood of the habit mobile thanks to balanced axes; In this arm he carries a bar thanks to which he indicates the weather approximately 24 hours in advance on various signs arranged from top to bottom on a column while he moves his hood to reveal his head when it is hot or to cover it when rain threatens, including the weather conditions "dry", "rough", "wind", "good", "unsafe", "windy", "wet" and "rain", with the friar's functions illustrated in the following verses that accompany the contraption:

Original text	Translation
¿Qué tiempo hará mañana? El Fraile te lo dirá. Su varita atentamente cada día observarás. Si a lo alto se encamina, tiempo seco encontrarás. Si hacia abajo se dirige, lluvia segura tendrás. Y mira bien su capucha, no te vayas a mojar.	How will be tomorrow's weather ? The good Friar is going to tell His wand with closed attention every day you should observe. If he points towards the top much dry weather you will find. If he points towards the base lots of rain you'l surely have . And observe right at his hood, to avoid just getting wet

The original model, a copy of which is preserved in the Capuchin Museum of Sarriá, presents the friar standing, although he is currently shown seated and accompanied by a globe at his feet and an hourglass on a table, recalling Ramon Llull in this pose, while the first version resembles the drawing of Brother Ramón de los Pirineos made by Celestí Sadurní Deop in 1876 for the cover of the Hermit Calendar. In addition to having the signs available in several languages ( Spanish, Catalan, Galician, Basque, Portuguese, French, Italian, German and English ), over time around forty variants of the friar have been developed of time (all of them preserved at the Tot Ideas headquarters), as a limited edition of 120. th anniversary of its creation in which the Montserrat massif appears as a background landscape (backgrounds were also created with the Expiatory Temple of the Sagrada Familia and the Cathedral of Santiago de Compostela ), or several minimalist and iconoclasts (with a plain frame or decorated with panots ) in white, yellow, red and black, known as Fraile Colors and marketed on the occasion of its 128th. th birthday, also highlighting several models in which the friar was replaced at the request of consumers by various figures: nuns (limited promotion), astronomers, a warrior from the Middle Ages, Christopher Columbus, Felix the cat and even trademark friars, including the one that illustrates the bottles of Kina San Clemente, a very popular drink in the 1960s as a restorative for children. Regarding the column where the signs indicating the weather appear, this, also the subject of a transformation, has been identified by some as the terminus cross located in the Plaza de Santa Ana de Mataró, a place that the Capuchins used to frequent during his stay in the city between 1610 and 1835.

== Operation ==
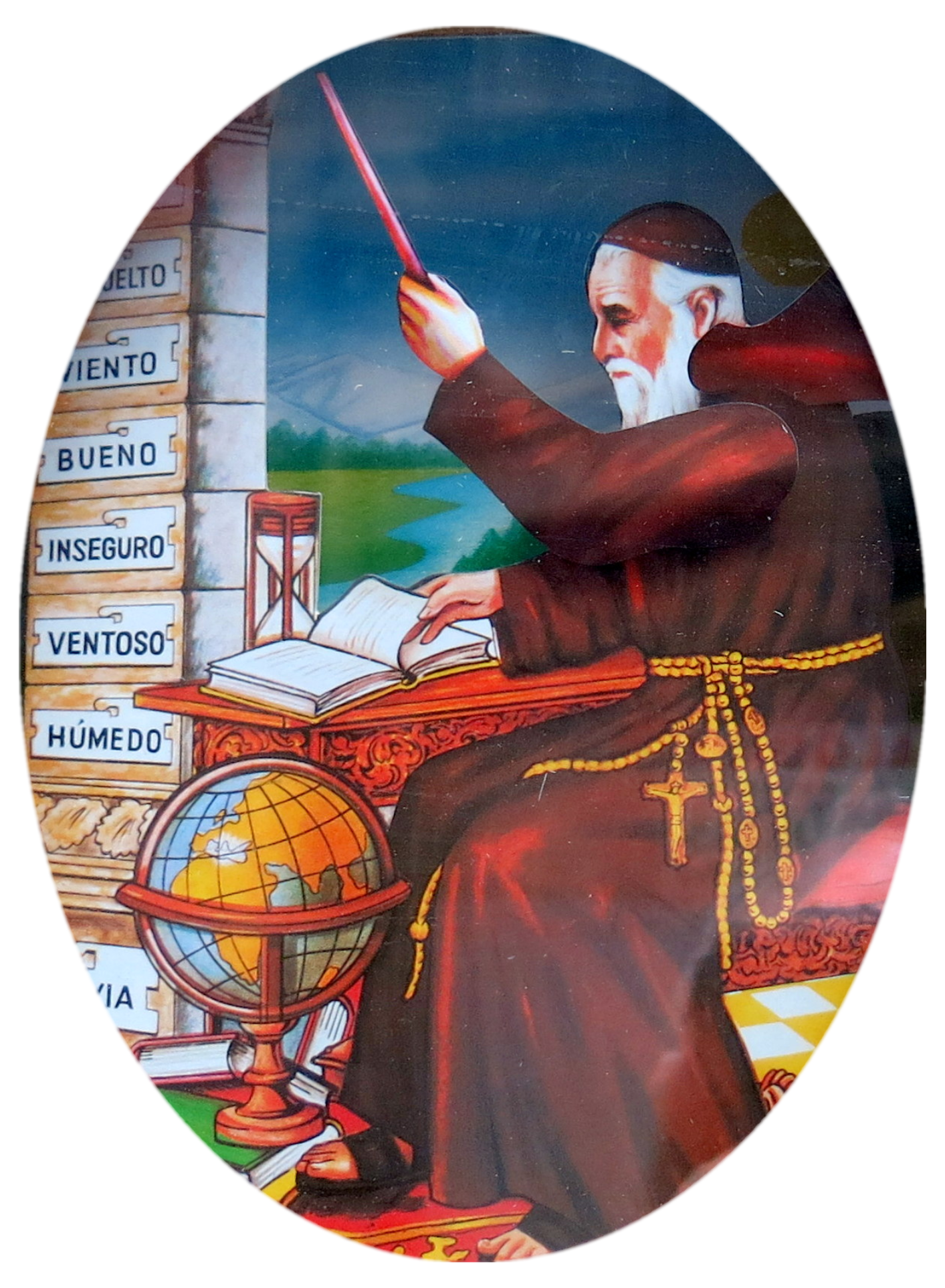
Weather friar (current model).

The mechanism that governs the movement of both the arm and the hood consists of a component of natural origin sensitive to humidity, specifically, grease-free and very taut human hair glued to an elastic band (especially women's hair: young and blonde Slavs given their high sensitivity), although some models use catgut or horsehair. The same system as that of the time houses. The contractions and expansions experienced by the hair depending on the water vapor present in the air govern the movement of the arm and the hood; Because humidity variations are usually accompanied by a change in atmospheric pressure, the weather indicated by the friar can be verified by the pressure marked on a barometer, a device with which the weather friar is often confused. As it is an absorption hygrometer, adjustments must be made since the device does not recognize on its own whether the degree of humidity is high or low. This adjustment, which can be carried out as many times as necessary and preferably using a conventional or digital hygrometer, must be carried out on a day without excess humidity or dryness and after the friar has been there for several hours exposed in its final location; Using hands located on the back, the arm must be rotated until the bar points at the sign with the "good" indicator and the hood raised or lowered until it is halfway along its trajectory (leaving the friar's head at half covered), never making a 360° turn and ensuring that both the arm and the hood do not trip over or rub against anything when turning. For correct operation, the friar must be placed in a dry place with plenty of ventilation in order to avoid saturation in the air, a fact that could negatively affect the device by forcing it to indicate the wrong climate, although being made of cardboard It should be kept indoors as otherwise its useful life will be reduced. Regarding maintenance, because the hair withers and dries over time, it is necessary to change the hair approximately once a week or when the device begins to show weather that does not coincide with the real one, although to avoid this inconvenience, electronic weather friars have been created which have an LCD screen, pressure, humidity and temperature sensors, and an internet connection to be able to synchronize the friar's clock and obtain weather data from outside, although maintaining the traditional look.

== Legacy ==
Currently, many farmers use the weather friar to check if their predictions coincide with those shown in the Hermit's Calendar, being today one of the most used in rural areas of Spain. France, Italy, England. and even Malta.
