= Moisture =

Presence of a liquid, especially water, often in trace amounts

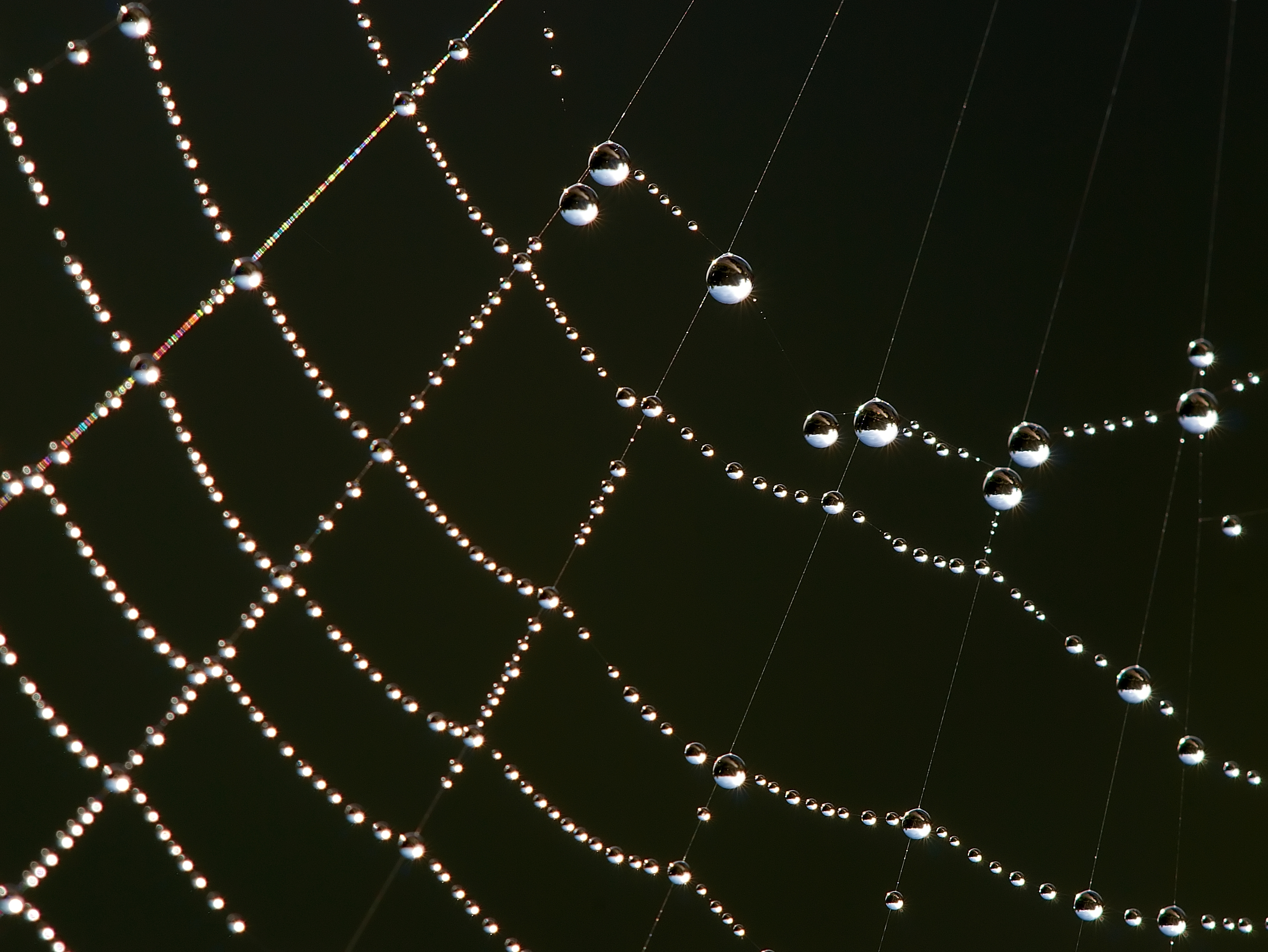
Dew on a spider web

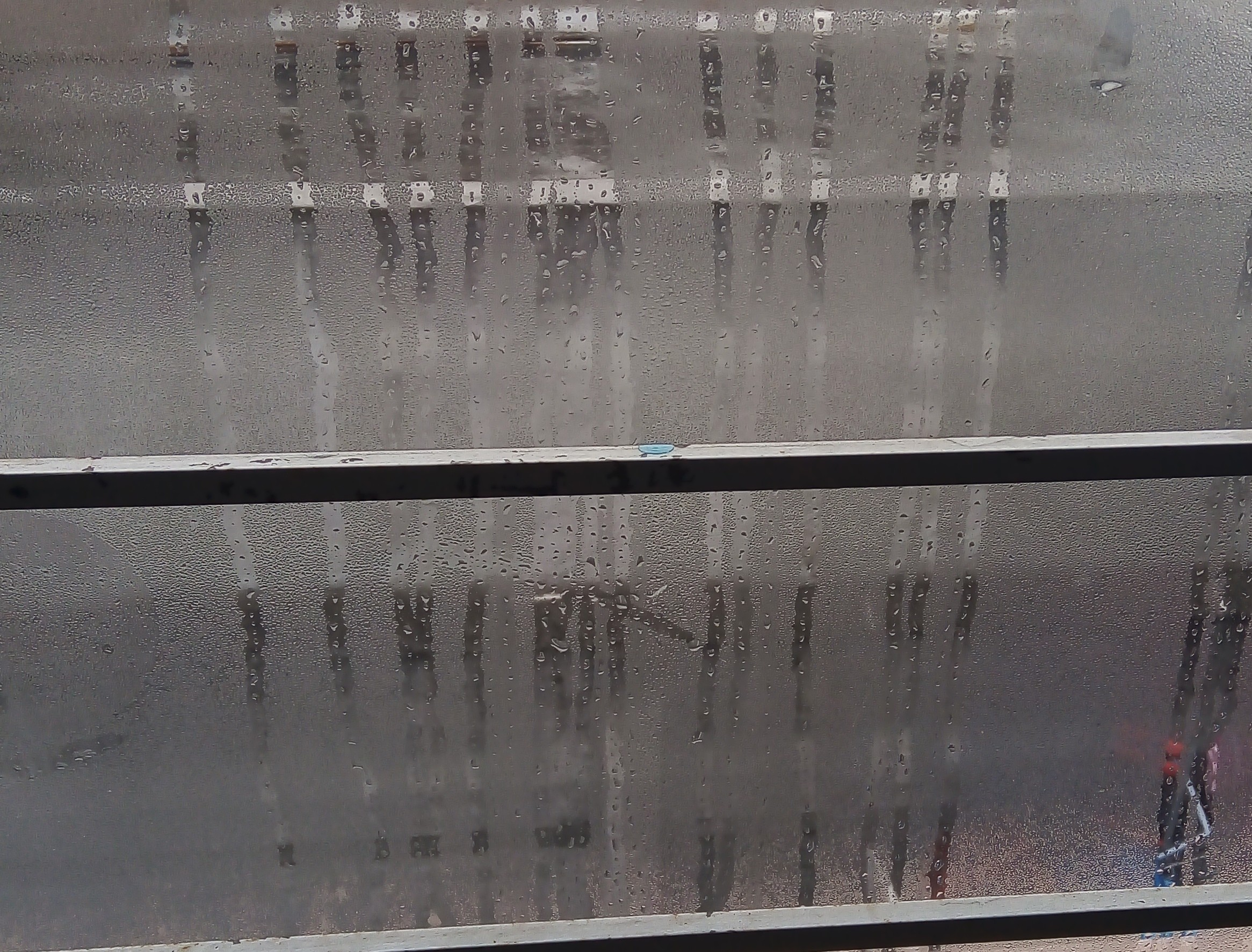
Water vapor deposits itself on colder surfaces.

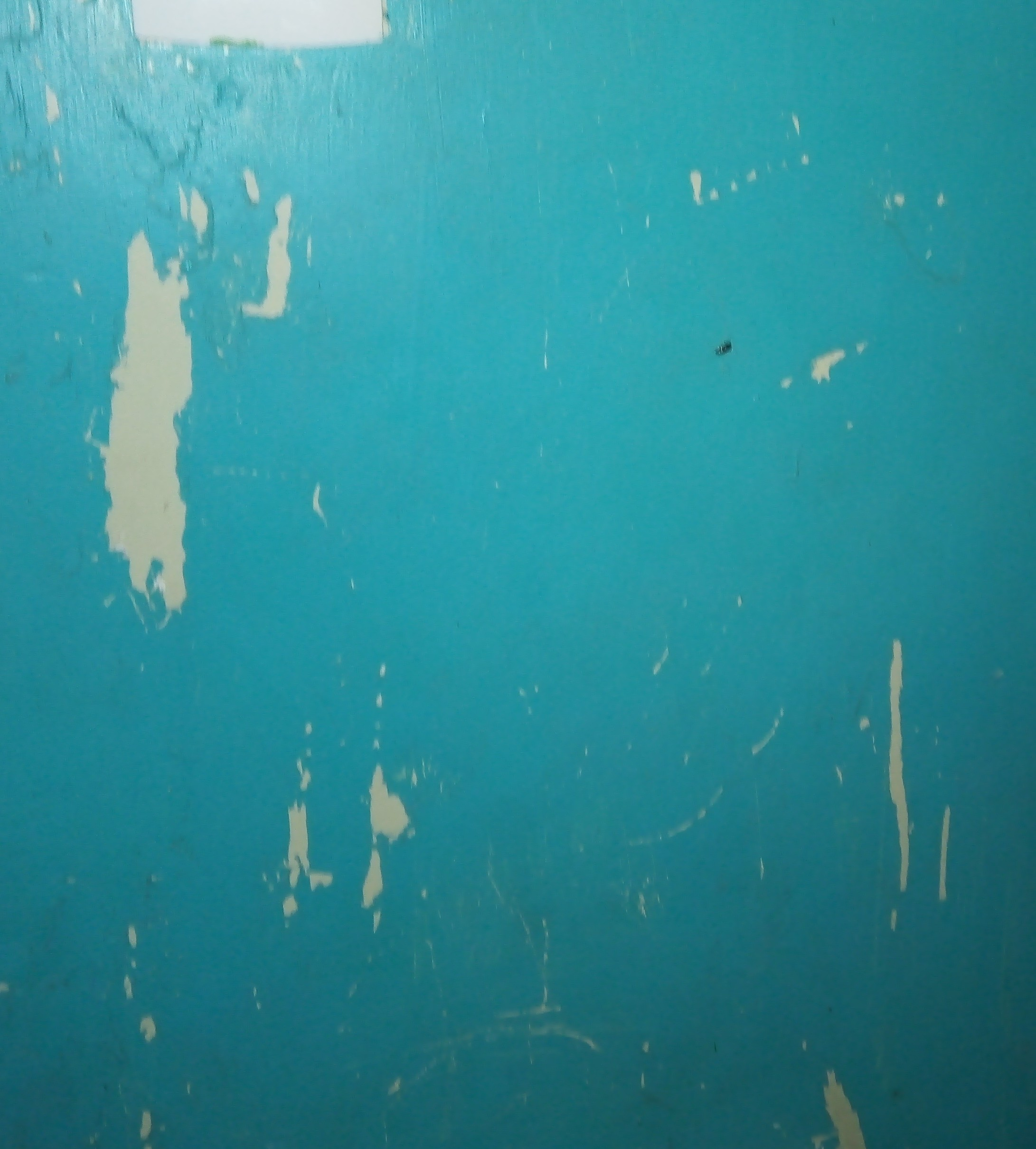
Excess moisture in the inside of a home can cause paint in the walls to start peeling off, in this case, paint in the wall of a bathroom.

Moisture is the presence of a liquid, especially water, often in trace amounts. Moisture is defined as water in the adsorbed or absorbed phase. Small amounts of water may be found, for example, in the air (humidity), in foods, and in some commercial products. Moisture also refers to the amount of water vapor present in the air. The soil also includes moisture.

== Moisture control in products ==
Control of moisture in products can be a vital part of the process of the product. There is a substantial amount of moisture in what seems to be dry matter. Ranging in products from cornflake cereals to washing powders, moisture can play an important role in the final quality of the product. There are two main aspects of concern in moisture control in products: allowing too much moisture or too little of it. For example, adding some water to cornflake cereal, which is sold by weight, reduces costs and prevents it from tasting too dry, but adding too much water can affect the crunchiness of the cereal and the freshness because water content contributes to bacteria growth. Water content of some foods is also manipulated to reduce the number of calories.

Moisture has different effects on different products, influencing the final quality of the product. Wood pellets, for instance, are made by taking remainders of wood and grinding them to make compact pellets, which are sold as a fuel. They need to have a relatively low water content for combustion efficiency. The more moisture that is allowed in the pellet, the more smoke that will be released when the pellet is burned.

The need to measure water content of products has given rise to a new area of science, aquametry. There are many ways to measure moisture in products, such as different wave measurement (light and audio), electromagnetic fields, capacitive methods, and the more traditional weighing and drying technique.

== See also ==
- Damp (structural)
- Dry matter
- Humidor
- Water content
