= Karl Fischer (chemist) =

German chemist (1901–1958)

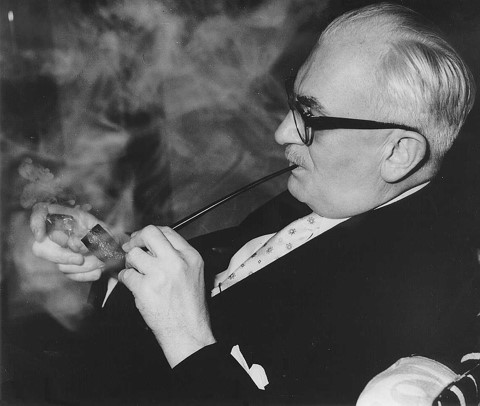
- Born: 24 March 1901; Pasing, Germany
- Died: 16 April 1958 (aged 57)
- Known for: developed the Karl Fischer titration

Karl Fischer (24 March 1901 – 16 April 1958) was a German chemist. In 1935 he published a method to determine trace amounts of water in samples. This method is now called Karl Fischer titration and was originally performed manually but has been automated. It remains the primary method of water content determination used worldwide by government, academia and industry laboratories, including major chemical manufacturers, refrigerant producers, and petroleum refiners.
