= Aquametry =

Aquametry, in analytical chemistry, is the use of analytical processes to measure the water present in materials.

The methods widely used in aquametry encompasses Karl Fischer titration, distillation, chromatography, infrared spectroscopy, and gravimetric analysis.

== Applications ==
=== Pharmaceuticals ===
Aquametry ensures stability of hygroscopic drugs and vaccines. The FDA mandates moisture control in tablet production to prevent degradation.

=== Food industry ===
Moisture content affects shelf life and texture. For example, baked goods require precise aquametry to avoid microbial growth.

=== Construction ===
ASTM standards specify aquametric testing for concrete curing and wood moisture levels to prevent structural failures.

== See also ==
- Hygroscopy
- Analytical chemistry
- Quality control
