= Watercut meter =

A water cut meter measures the water content (cut) of crude oil and hydrocarbons as they flow through a pipeline. While the title "Water cut" has been traditionally used, the current API naming is Water Cut Analyser or WCA as OWD or On-Line Water Determination is trademarked. Note: The use of the initialism BS&W for this type of meter is wrong. Water cut meters other than optically based devices are unlikely to be able to measure “Basic Sediment” the “BS” in BS&W. The ISO has not yet developed a standard, but in 2025 the API released API MPMS Chapter 10.10 which allows for their use alongside a proven sampling system. There are standards in place for fiscal automatic sampling of crude oil namely API 8.2 and ISO 3171. both of which are under revision.

Water cut meters are typically used in the petroleum industry to measure the water cut of oil flowing from a well, produced oil from a separator, crude oil transfer in pipelines and in loading tankers. There are several technologies used. The main technologies are dielectric measurements using radio or microwave frequency and NIR measurements and less common are gamma ray based instruments.

The water cut is the ratio of water produced compared to the volume of total liquids produced from an oil well. The water cut in waterdrive reservoirs can reach very high values.
