= Dewcell =

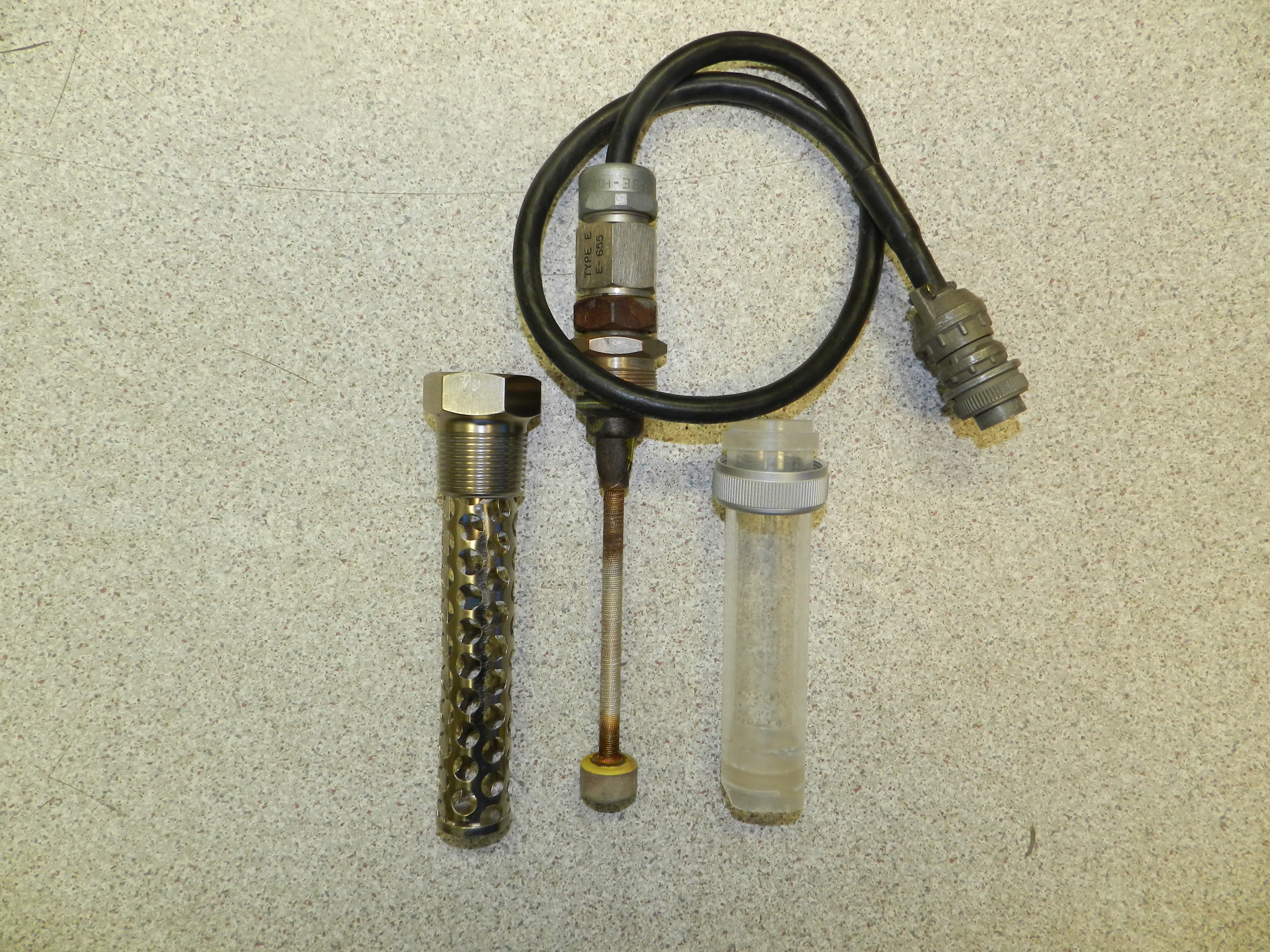
Dewcell (centre) with the protective guard used for storage and transportation on the right and the cover used while in operation on the left.

A dewcell (also dewcel or dew cell) is an instrument used for determining the dew point. They consist of a small heating element surrounded by a solution of lithium chloride (LiCl). As the LiCl absorbs moisture from the air, conduction across the heating element increases, current in it increases, and heat increases, evaporating moisture from the salt solution. At a certain temperature the amount of moisture absorbed by the salt solution equals the amount evaporated (equilibrium).

Inside the dewcell core a thermistor composite (or other temperature measurement device) changes electrical resistance with the temperature created by the heating. A front end processor provides a reference voltage, measures the output of the network, and calculates the dew point.
