= Karl Fischer titration =

Chemical method to determine trace amounts of water in a sample

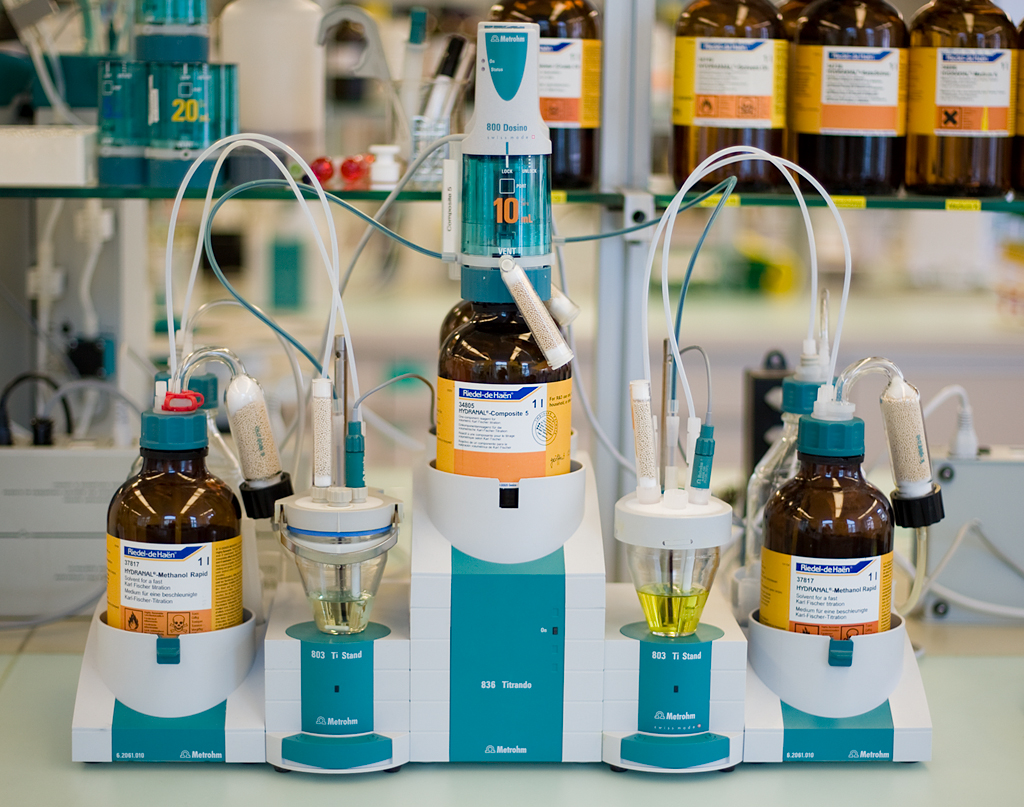
A Karl Fischer titrator

In analytical chemistry, Karl Fischer titration is a classic titration method that uses coulometric or volumetric titration to determine trace amounts of water in a sample. It was invented in 1935 by the German chemist Karl Fischer. Today, the titration is done with an automated Karl Fischer titrator.

== Chemical principle ==
The elementary reaction responsible for water quantification in the Karl Fischer titration is oxidation of sulfur dioxide (SO_{2}) with iodine:

H_{2}O + SO_{2} + I_{2} → SO_{3} + 2 HI

This elementary reaction consumes exactly one molar equivalent of water vs. iodine. Iodine is added to the solution until it is present in excess, marking the end point of the titration, which can be detected by potentiometry. The reaction is run in an alcohol solution containing a base, which consumes the sulfur trioxide and hydroiodic acid produced.

== Coulometric titration ==
The main compartment of the titration cell contains the anode solution plus the analyte. The anode solution consists of an alcohol (ROH), a base (B), sulfur dioxide (SO_{2}) and KI. Typical alcohols that may be used include ethanol, diethylene glycol monoethyl ether, or methanol, sometimes referred to as Karl Fischer grade. A common base is imidazole.

The titration cell also consists of a smaller compartment with a cathode immersed in the anode solution of the main compartment. The two compartments are separated by an ion-permeable membrane.

The Pt anode generates I_{2} from the KI when current is provided through the electric circuit. The net reaction as shown below is oxidation of SO_{2} by I_{2}. One mole of I_{2} is consumed for each mole of H_{2}O. In other words, 2 moles of electrons are consumed per mole of water.

2 I^{−} → I_{2} + 2 e^{−}
B·I_{2} + B·SO_{2} + B + H_{2}O → 2 BH^{+}I^{−} + BSO_{3}
BSO_{3} + ROH → BHRSO_{4}

The end point is detected most commonly by a bipotentiometric titration method. A second pair of Pt electrodes is immersed in the anode solution. The detector circuit maintains a constant current between the two detector electrodes during titration. Prior to the equivalence point, the solution contains I^{−} but little I_{2}. At the equivalence point, excess I_{2} appears and an abrupt voltage drop marks the end point. The amount of charge needed to generate I_{2} and reach the end point can then be used to calculate the amount of water in the original sample.

== Volumetric titration ==
The volumetric titration is based on the same principles as the coulometric titration, except that the anode solution above now is used as the titrant solution. The titrant consists of an alcohol (ROH), base (B), SO_{2} and a known concentration of I_{2}. Pyridine has been used as the base in this case.

One mole of I_{2} is consumed for each mole of H_{2}O. The titration reaction proceeds as above, and the end point may be detected by a bipotentiometric method as described above.

== Disadvantages and advantages ==
The popularity of the Karl Fischer titration (henceforth referred to as KF) is due in large part to several practical advantages that it holds over other methods of moisture determination, such as accuracy, speed and selectivity.

KF is selective for water, because the titration reaction itself consumes water. In contrast, measurement of mass loss on drying will detect the loss of any volatile substance. However, the strong redox chemistry (SO_{2}/I_{2}) means that redox-active sample constituents may react with the reagents. For this reason, KF is unsuitable for solutions containing e.g. dimethyl sulfoxide.

KF has a high accuracy and precision, typically within 1% of available water, e.g. 3.00% appears as 2.97–3.03%. Although KF is a destructive analysis, the sample quantity is small and is typically limited by the accuracy of weighing. For example, in order to obtain an accuracy of 1% using a scale with the typical accuracy of 0.2 mg, the sample must contain 20 mg water, which is e.g. 200 mg for a sample with 10% water. For coulometers, the measuring range is from 1–5 ppm to about 5%. Volumetric KF readily measures samples up to 100%, but requires impractically large amounts of sample for analytes with less than 0.05% water. The KF response is linear. Therefore, single-point calibration using a calibrated 1% water standard is sufficient and no calibration curves are necessary.

Little sample preparation is needed: a liquid sample can usually be directly injected using a syringe. The analysis is typically complete within a minute. However, KF suffers from an error called drift, which is an apparent water input that can confuse the measurement. The glass walls of the vessel adsorb water, and if any water leaks into the cell, the slow release of water into the titration solution can continue for a long time. Therefore, before measurement, it is necessary to carefully dry the vessel and run a 10–30-minute "dry run" in order to calculate the rate of drift. The drift is then subtracted from the result.

KF is suitable for measuring liquids and, with special equipment, gases. The major disadvantage with solids is that the water has to be accessible and easily brought into methanol solution. Many common substances, especially foods such as chocolate, release water slowly and with difficulty, requiring additional efforts to reliably bring the total water content into contact with the Karl Fischer reagents. For example, a high-shear mixer may be installed to the cell in order to break the sample. KF has problems with compounds with strong binding to water, as in water of hydration, for example with lithium chloride, so KF is unsuitable for the special solvent LiCl/DMAc.

KF is suitable for automation. Generally, KF is conducted using a separate KF titrator, or for volumetric titration, a KF titration cell installed into a general-purpose titrator. There are also oven attachments that can be used for materials that have problems being analyzed normally in the cell. The important aspect about the oven attachment is that the material doesn't decompose into water when heated to release the water. The oven attachment also supports automation of samples.

Using volumetric titration with visual detection of a titration endpoint is also possible with coloured samples by UV/VIS spectrophotometric detection.

== See also ==
- Titration
- Moisture analysis

== Literature ==
- Water determination by Karl Fischer Titration by Peter A. Bruttel, Regina Schlink, Metrohm AG
