= Cooling tower =

Device which rejects waste heat to the atmosphere through the cooling of a water stream

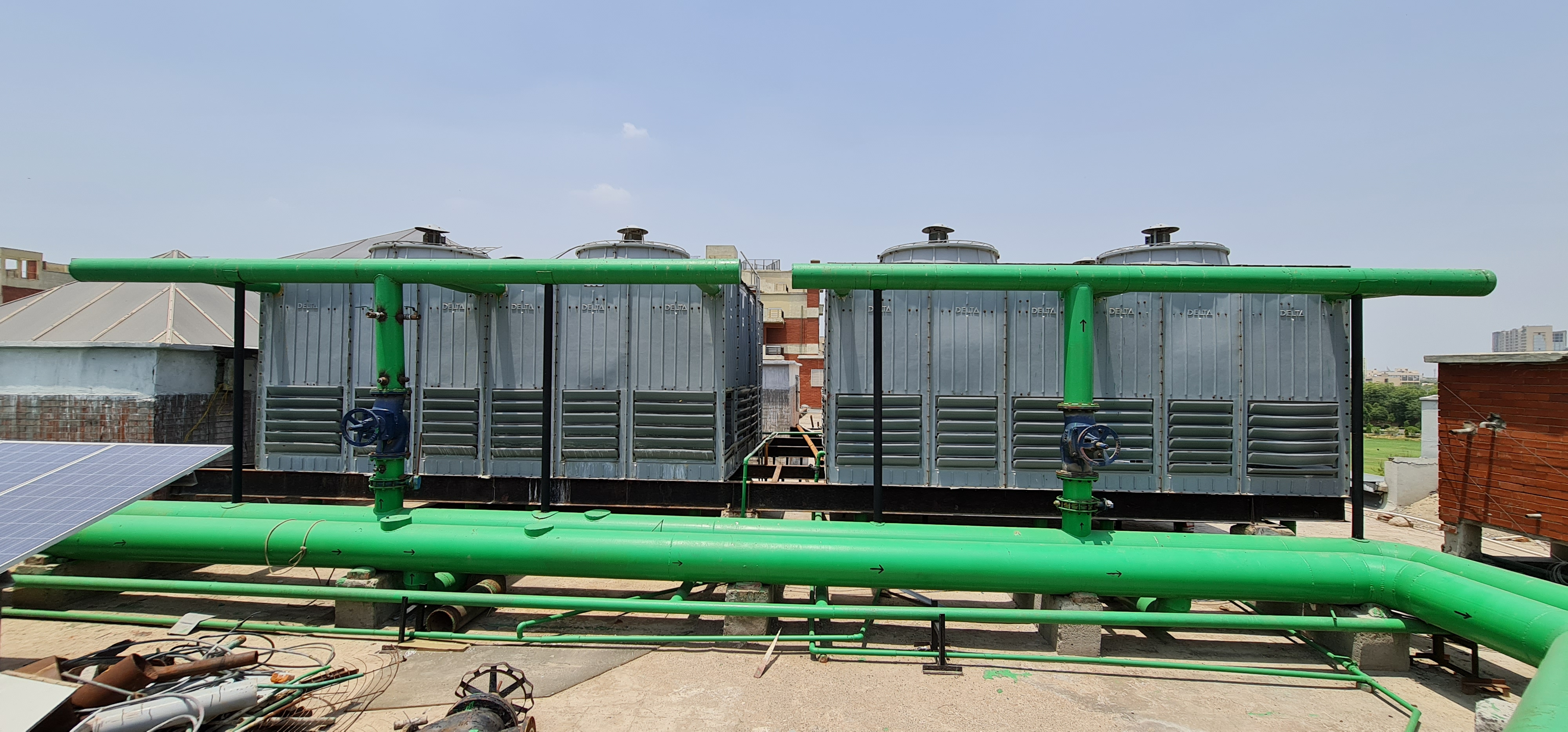
A typical induced draft open-loop cooling tower rejecting heat from the condenser water loop of an industrial chiller unit

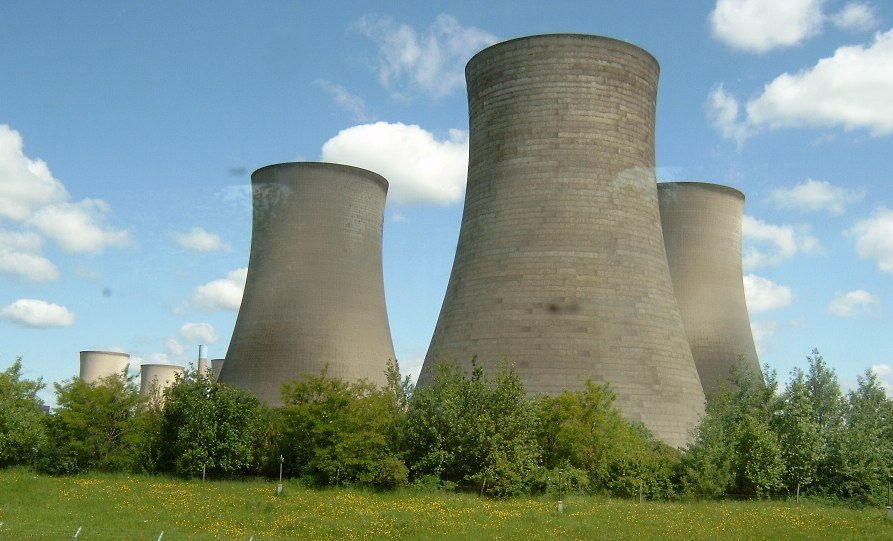
Natural draft wet cooling hyperboloid towers at Didcot Power Station (UK)

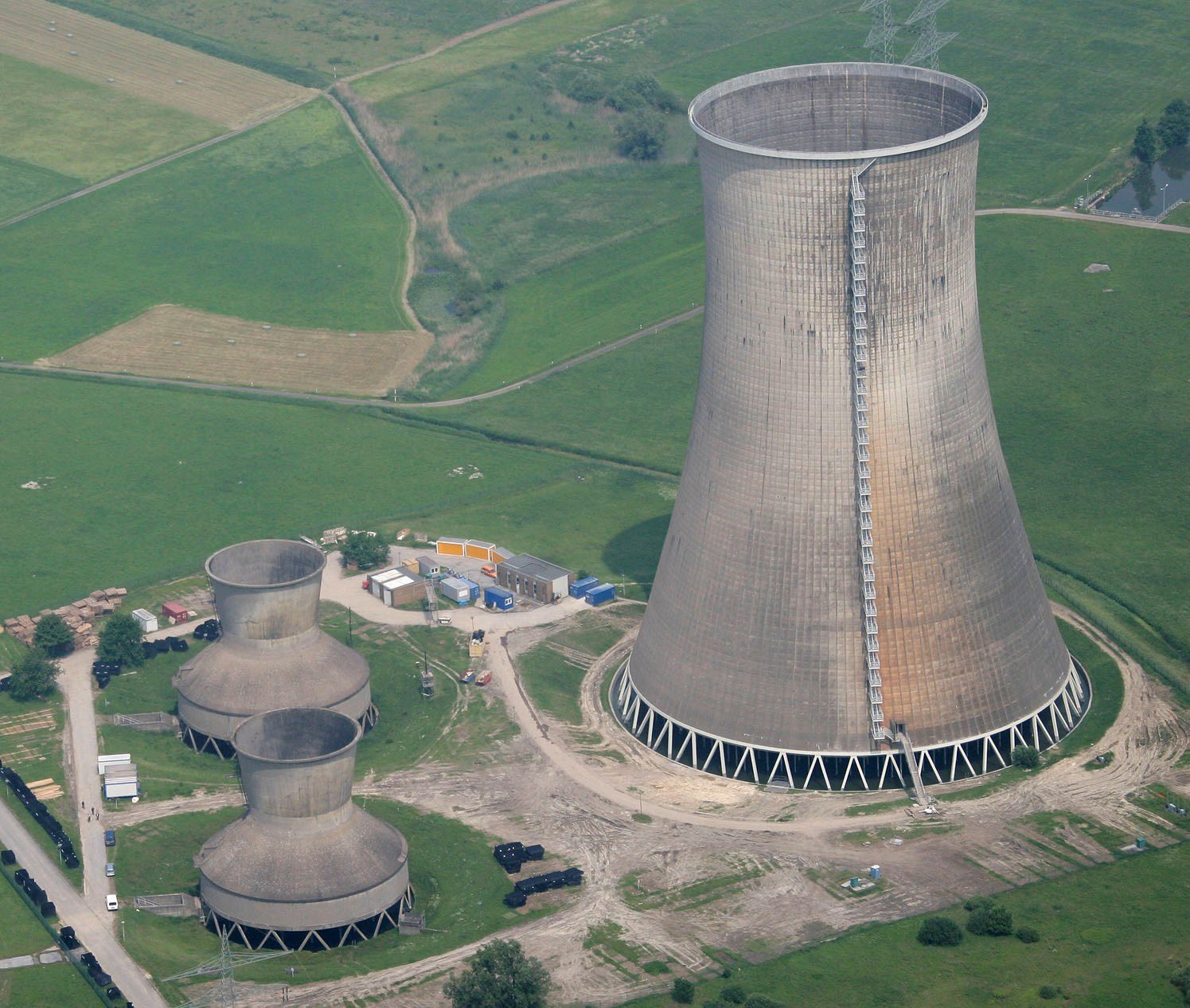
Forced draft wet cooling towers (height: 34 meters) and natural draft wet cooling tower (height: 122 meters) in Westphalia, Germany

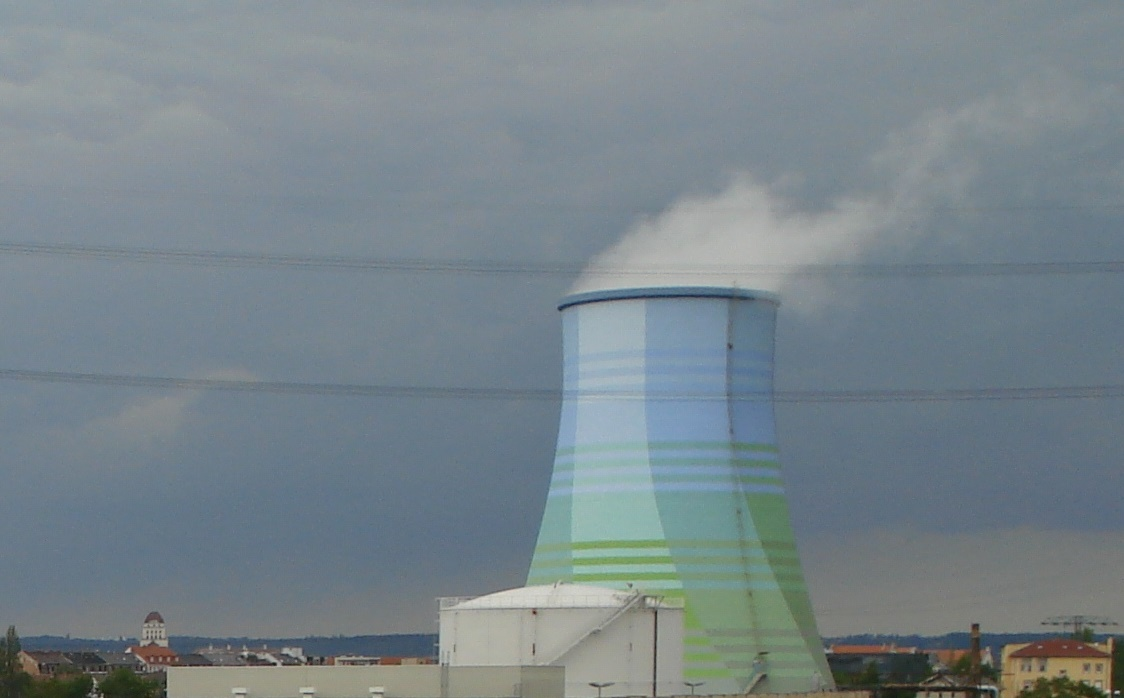
Natural draft wet cooling tower in Dresden (Germany)

A cooling tower is a device that rejects waste heat to the atmosphere through the cooling of a coolant stream, usually a water stream, to a lower temperature. Cooling towers may either use the evaporation of water to remove heat and cool the working fluid to near the wet-bulb air temperature or, in the case of dry cooling towers, rely solely on air to cool the working fluid to near the dry-bulb air temperature using radiators.

Common applications include cooling the circulating water used in oil refineries, petrochemical and other chemical plants, thermal power stations, nuclear power stations and HVAC systems for cooling buildings. The classification is based on the type of air induction into the tower: the main types of cooling towers are natural draft and induced draft cooling towers.

Cooling towers vary in size from small roof-top units to very large hyperboloid structures that can be up to 200 metres (660 ft) tall and 100 metres (330 ft) in diameter, or rectangular structures that can be over 40 metres (130 ft) tall and 80 metres (260 ft) long. Hyperboloid cooling towers are often associated with nuclear power plants, although they are also used in many coal-fired plants and to some extent in some large chemical and other industrial plants. The steam turbine is what necessitates the cooling tower to condense and recirculate the water. Although these large towers are very prominent, the vast majority of cooling towers are much smaller, including many units installed on or near buildings to discharge heat from air conditioning. Cooling towers are also often thought to emit smoke or harmful fumes by the general public, when in reality the emissions from those towers mostly do not contribute to carbon footprint, consisting solely of water vapor.

== History ==
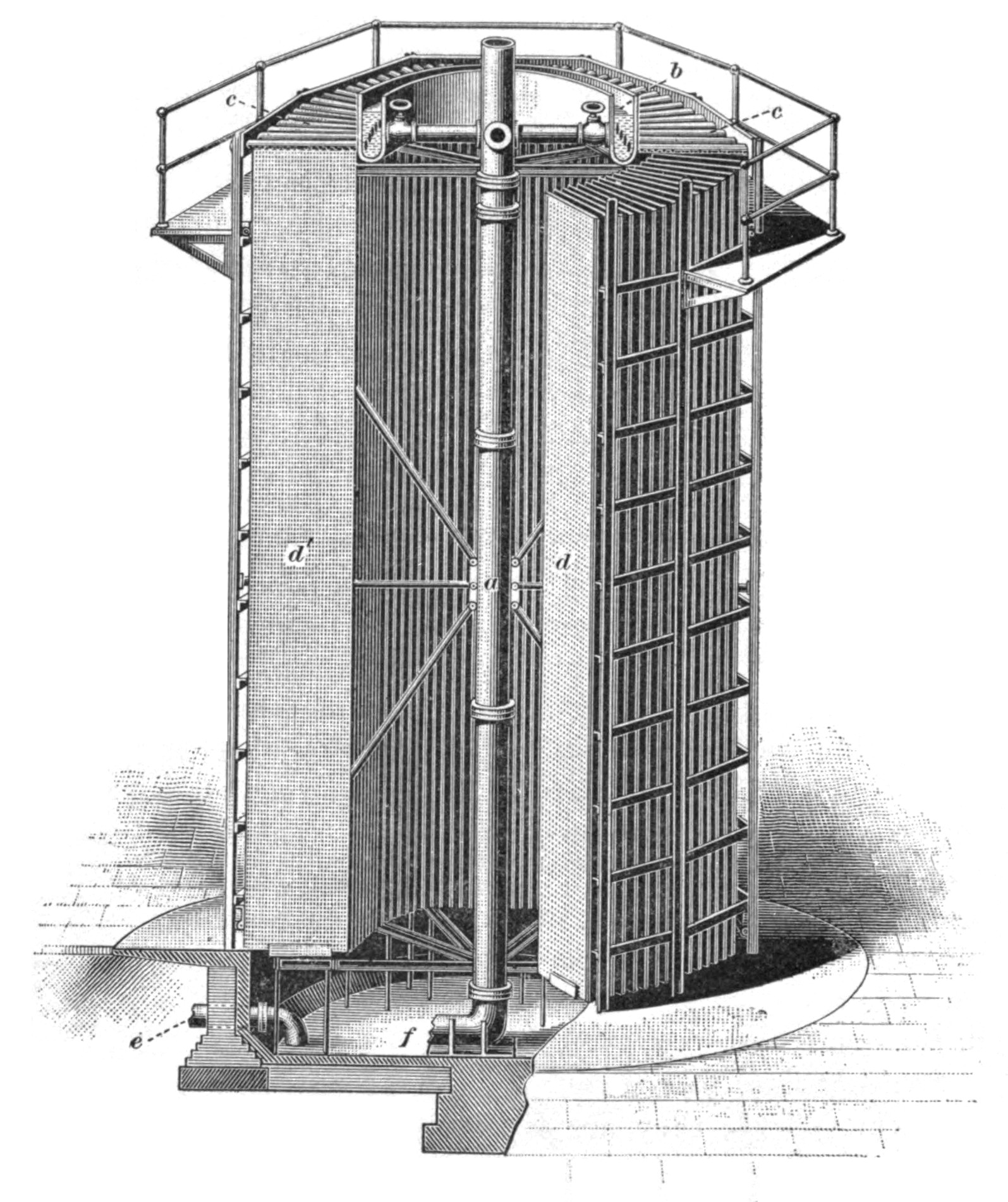
A 1902 engraving of "Barnard's fanless self-cooling tower", an early large evaporative cooling tower that relied on natural draft and open sides rather than a fan; water to be cooled was sprayed from the top onto the radial pattern of vertical wire-mesh mats.

Cooling towers originated in the 19th century through the development of condensers for use with the steam engine. Condensers use relatively cool water, via various means, to condense the steam coming out of the cylinders or turbines. This reduces the back pressure, which in turn reduces the steam consumption, and thus the fuel consumption, while at the same time increasing power and recycling boiler water. However, the condensers require an ample supply of cooling water, without which they are impractical. While water usage is not an issue with marine engines, it forms a significant limitation for many land-based systems.

By the turn of the 20th century, several evaporative methods of recycling cooling water were in use in areas lacking an established water supply, as well as in urban locations where municipal water mains may not be of sufficient supply, reliable in times of high demand, or otherwise adequate to meet cooling needs. In areas with available land, the systems took the form of cooling ponds; in areas with limited land, such as in cities, they took the form of cooling towers.

Early cooling towers were positioned either on the rooftops of buildings or as free-standing structures, supplied with air by fans or relying on natural airflow. An American engineering textbook from 1911 described one design as “a circular or rectangular shell of light plate—in effect, a chimney stack much shortened vertically (20 to 40 ft. high) and very much enlarged laterally. At the top is a set of distributing troughs, to which the water from the condenser must be pumped; from these it trickles down over ‘mats’ made of wooden slats or woven wire screens, which fill the space within the tower.”

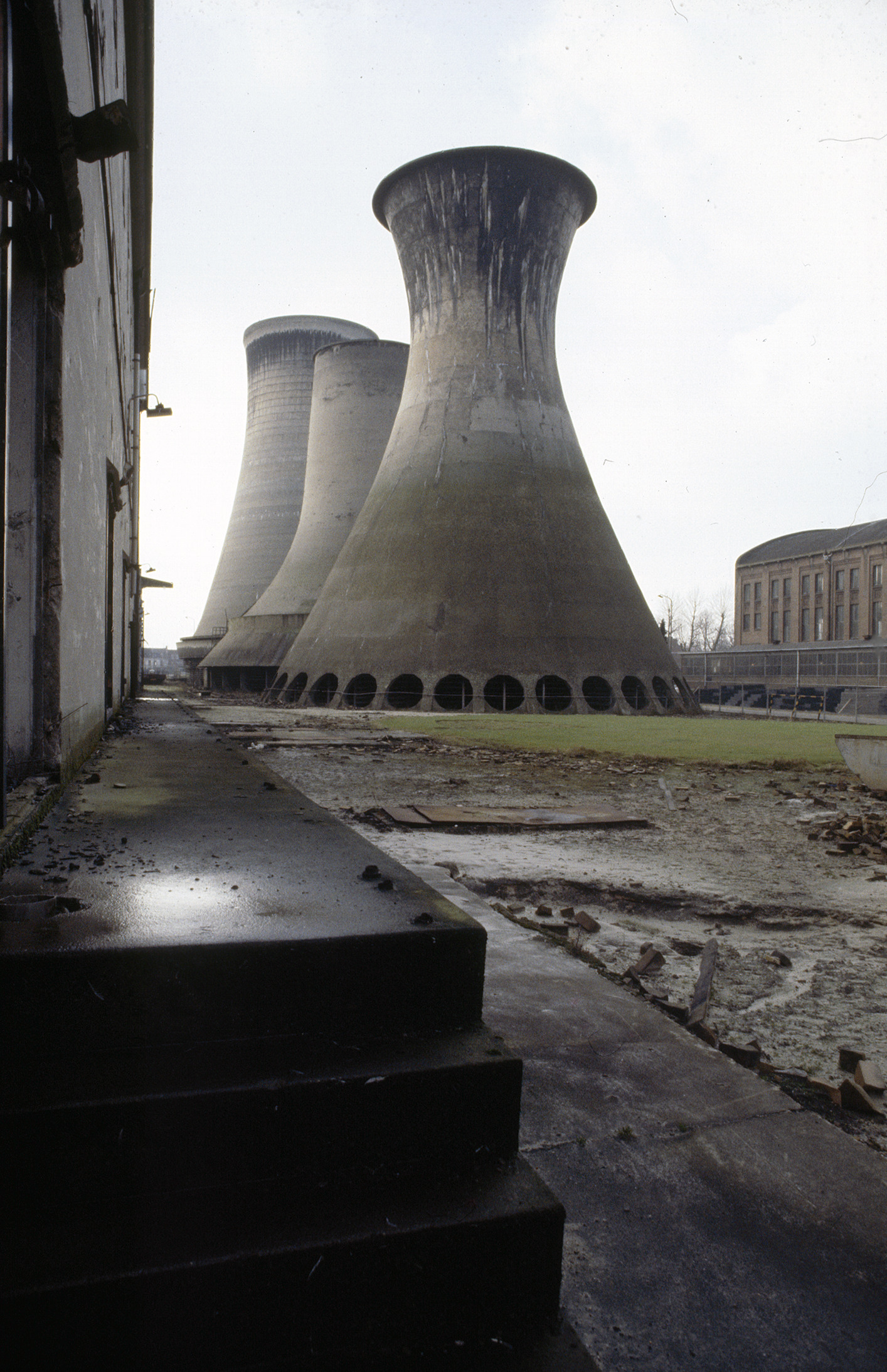
Van Iterson cooling tower, 1918

A hyperboloid cooling tower was patented by the Dutch engineers Frederik van Iterson and Gerard Kuypers in the Netherlands on August 16, 1916. The first hyperboloid reinforced concrete cooling tower was built by the Dutch State Mine (DSM) Emma in 1917 in Heerlen (Koeltoren II). The first ones in the United Kingdom were built in 1924 at Lister Drive power station in Liverpool, England. On both locations they were built to cool water used at a coal-fired electrical power station.

According to a Gas Technology Institute (GTI) report, the indirect–dew-point evaporative-cooling Maisotsenko Cycle (M-Cycle) is a theoretically sound method of reducing a working fluid to the ambient fluid’s dew point, which is lower than the ambient fluid’s wet-bulb temperature. The M-cycle utilizes the psychrometric energy (or the potential energy) available from the latent heat of water evaporating into the air. While its current manifestation is as the M-Cycle HMX for air conditioning, through engineering design this cycle could be applied as a heat- and moisture-recovery device for combustion devices, cooling towers, condensers, and other processes involving humid gas streams.

The consumption of cooling water by inland processing and power plants is estimated to reduce power availability for the majority of thermal power plants by 2040–2069.

In 2021, researchers presented a method for steam recapture. The steam is charged using an ion beam, and then captured in a wire mesh of opposite charge. The water's purity exceeded EPA potability standards.

== Classification by use ==
=== Heating, ventilation and air conditioning (HVAC) ===
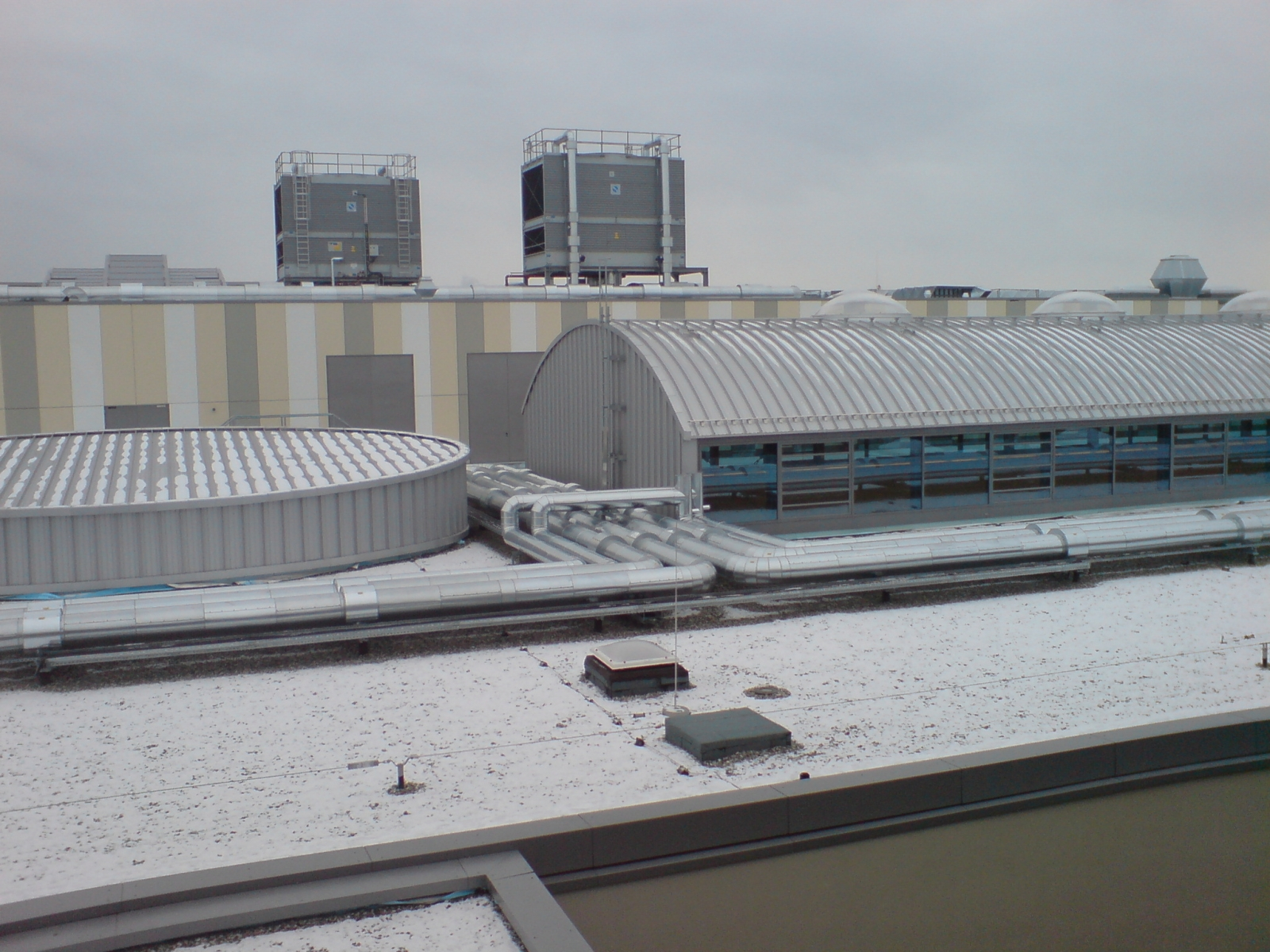
Two HVAC cooling towers on the rooftop of a shopping center (Weiterstadt, Hessen, Germany)

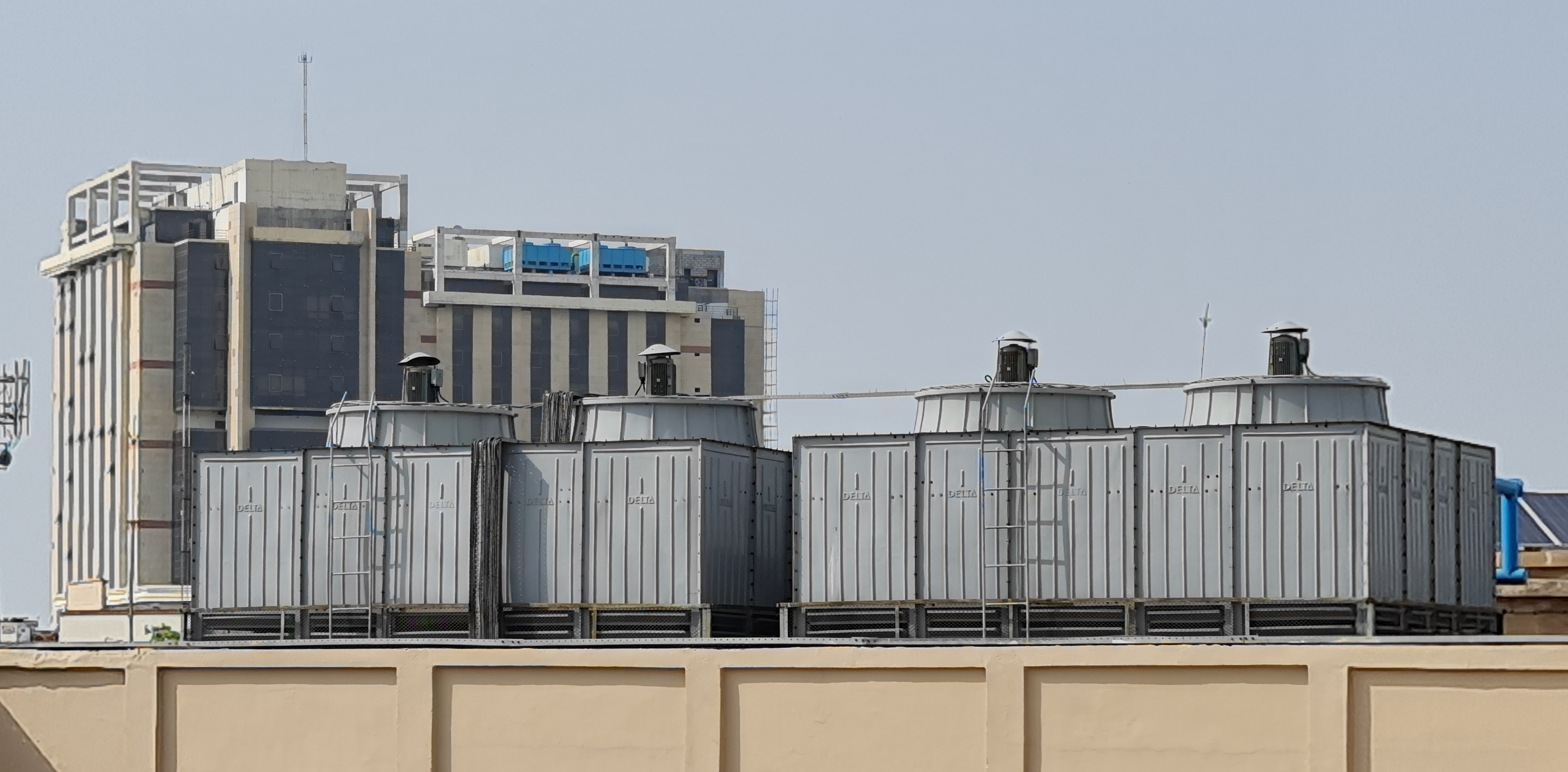
FRP cooling towers installed on roof top

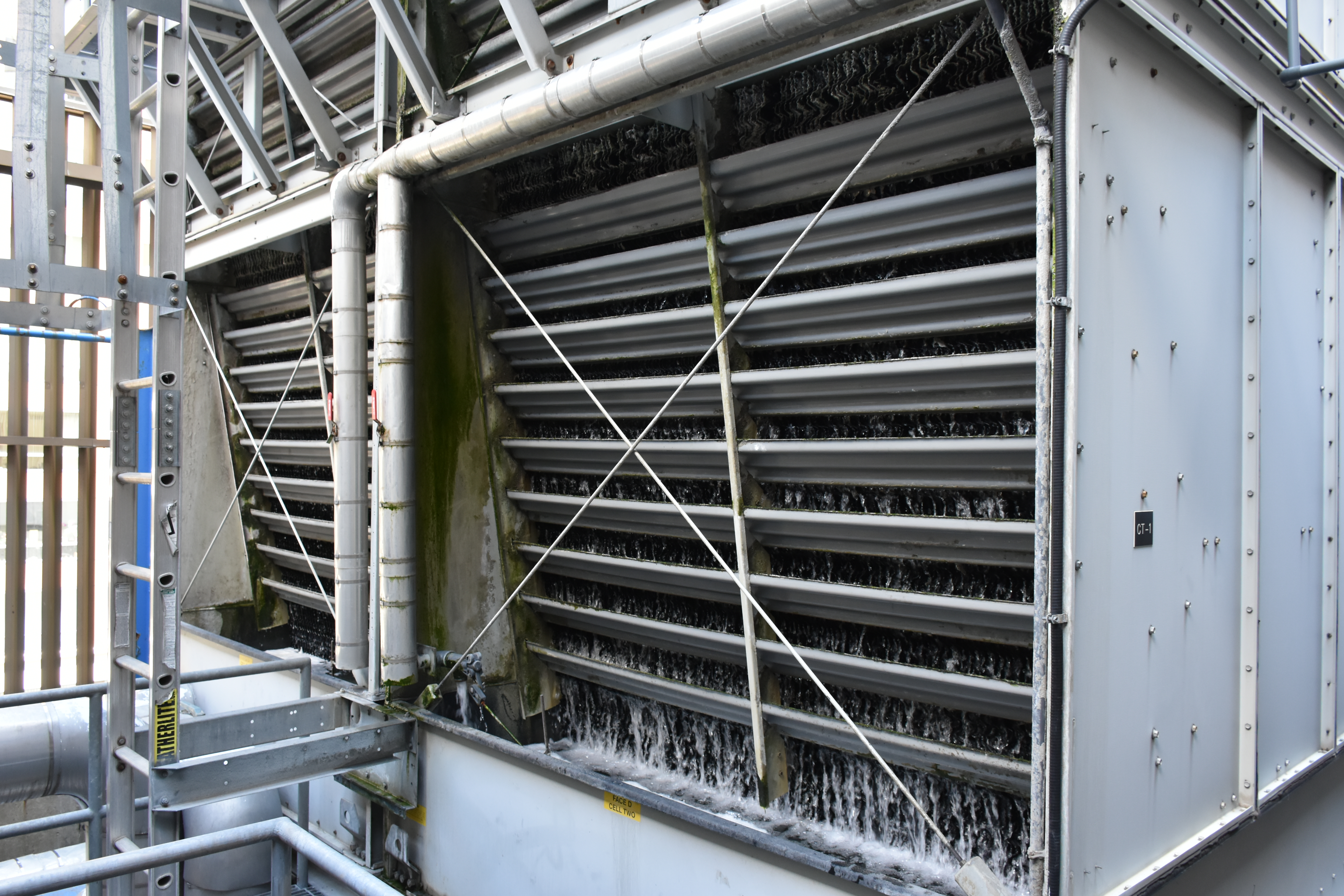
Cell of a cross-flow type cooling tower with fill material and circulating water visible

An HVAC (heating, ventilating, and air conditioning) cooling tower is used to dispose of ("reject") unwanted heat from a chiller. Liquid-cooled chillers are normally more energy efficient than air-cooled chillers due to heat rejection to tower water at or near wet-bulb temperatures. Air-cooled chillers must reject heat at the higher dry-bulb temperature, and thus have a lower average reverse–Carnot-cycle effectiveness. In hot climates, large office buildings, hospitals, and schools typically use cooling towers in their air conditioning systems. Generally, industrial cooling towers are much larger than HVAC towers. HVAC use of a cooling tower pairs the cooling tower with a liquid-cooled chiller or liquid-cooled condenser. A ton of air-conditioning is defined as the removal of 12,000 British thermal units per hour (3.5 kW). The equivalent ton on the cooling tower side actually rejects about 15,000 British thermal units per hour (4.4 kW) due to the additional waste-heat–equivalent of the energy needed to drive the chiller's compressor. This equivalent ton is defined as the heat rejection in cooling 3 US gallons per minute (11 litres per minute) or 1,500 pounds per hour (680 kg/h) of water by 10 °F (5.6 °C), which amounts to 15,000 British thermal units per hour (4.4 kW), assuming a chiller coefficient of performance (COP) of 4.0. This COP is equivalent to an energy efficiency ratio (EER) of 14.

Cooling towers are also used in HVAC systems that have multiple water source heat pumps that share a common piping water loop. In this type of system, the water circulating inside the water loop removes heat from the condenser of the heat pumps whenever the heat pumps are working in the cooling mode, then the externally mounted cooling tower is used to remove heat from the water loop and reject it to the atmosphere. By contrast, when the heat pumps are working in heating mode, the condensers draw heat out of the loop water and reject it into the space to be heated. When the water loop is being used primarily to supply heat to the building, the cooling tower is normally shut down (and may be drained or winterized to prevent freeze damage), and heat is supplied by other means, usually from separate boilers.

=== Industrial cooling towers ===
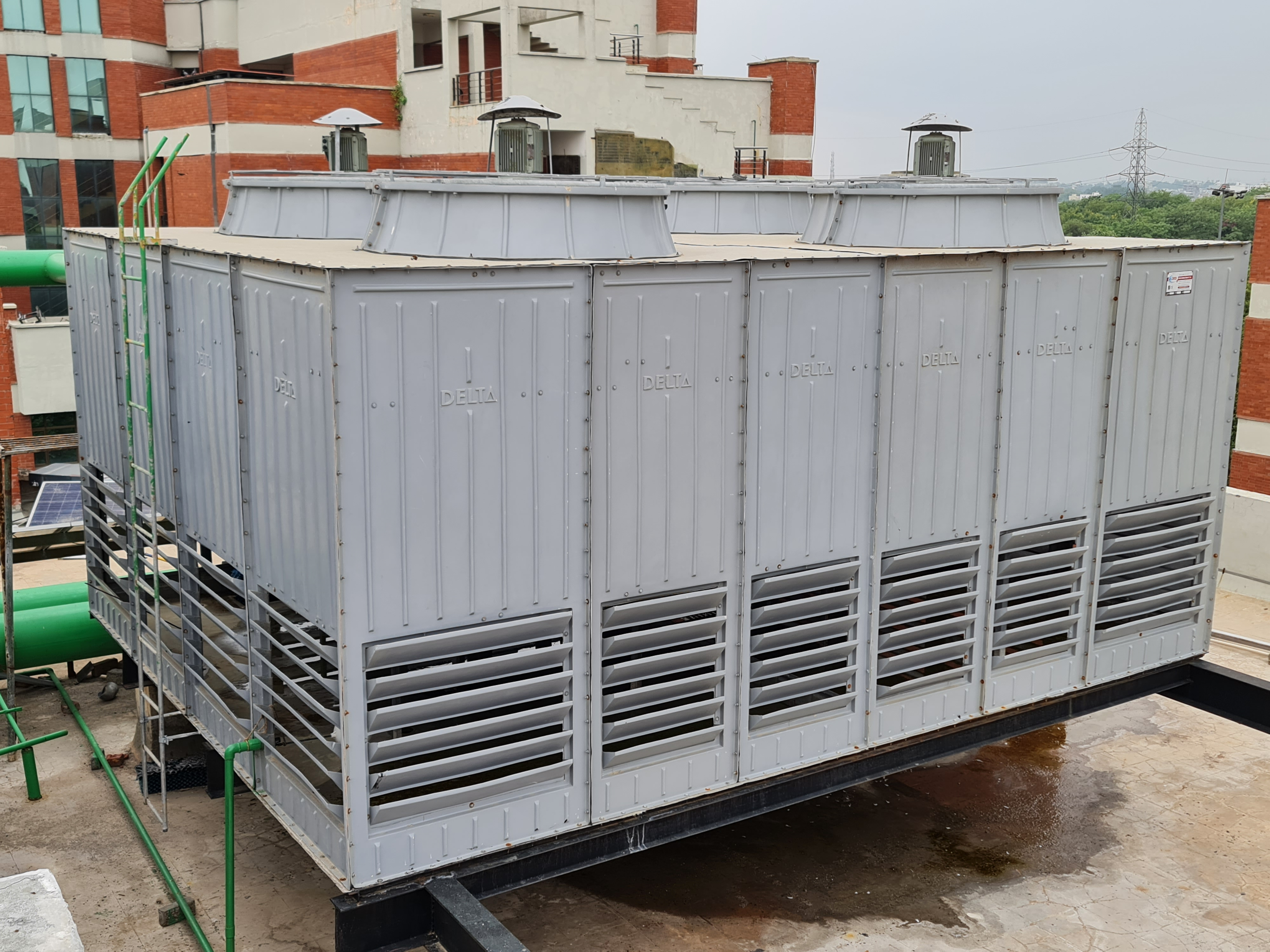

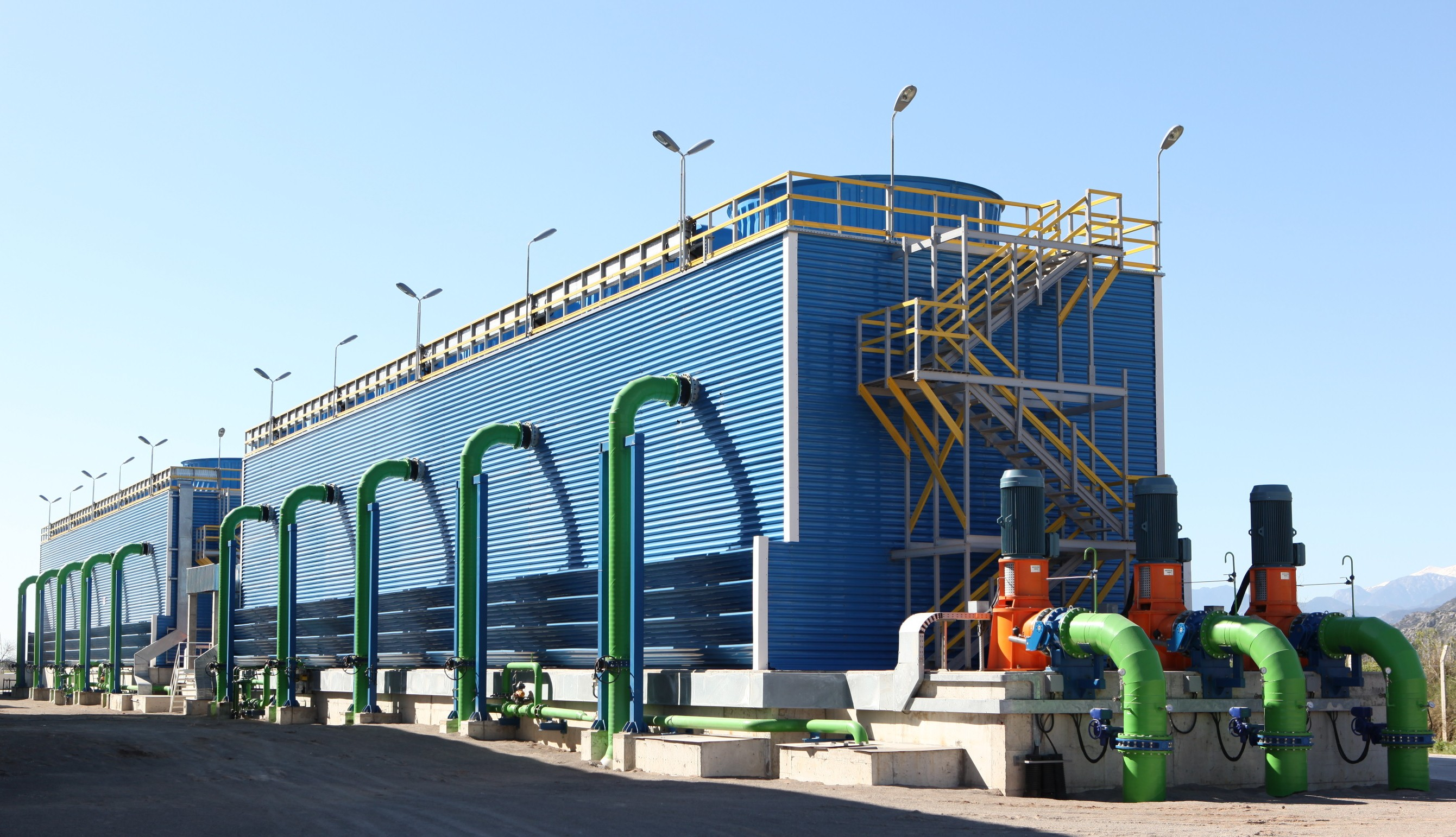
Industrial cooling towers for a power plant

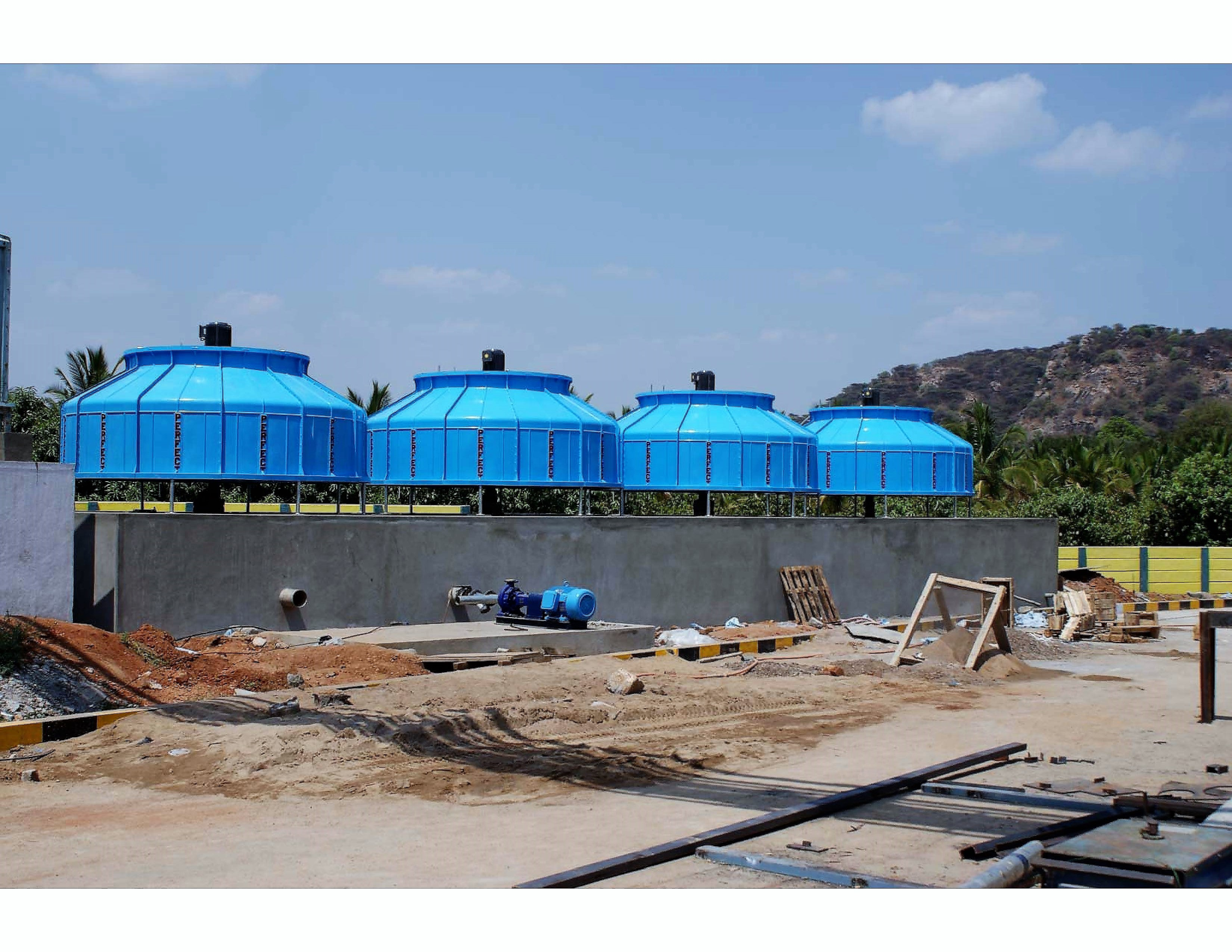
Industrial cooling towers for fruit processing

Industrial cooling towers can be used to remove heat from various sources such as machinery or heated process material. The primary use of large, industrial cooling towers is to remove the heat absorbed in the circulating cooling water systems used in power plants, petroleum refineries, petrochemical plants, natural gas processing plants, food processing plants, semi-conductor plants, and for other industrial facilities such as in condensers of distillation columns, for cooling liquid in crystallization, etc. The circulation rate of cooling water in a typical 700 MW_{th} coal-fired power plant with a cooling tower amounts to about 71,600 cubic metres an hour (315,000 US gallons per minute) and the circulating water requires a supply water make-up rate of perhaps 5 percent (i.e., 3,600 cubic metres an hour, equivalent to one cubic metre every second).

If that same plant had no cooling tower and used once-through cooling water, it would require about 100,000 cubic metres an hour A large cooling water intake typically kills millions of fish and larvae annually, as the organisms are impinged on the intake screens. A large amount of water would have to be continuously returned to the ocean, lake or river from which it was obtained and continuously re-supplied to the plant. Furthermore, discharging large amounts of hot water may raise the temperature of the receiving river or lake to an unacceptable level for the local ecosystem. Elevated water temperatures can kill fish and other aquatic organisms (see thermal pollution), or can also cause an increase in undesirable organisms such as invasive species of zebra mussels or algae.

A cooling tower serves to dissipate the heat into the atmosphere instead, so that wind and air diffusion spreads the heat over a much larger area than hot water can distribute heat in a body of water. Evaporative cooling water cannot be used for subsequent purposes (other than rain somewhere), whereas surface-only cooling water can be re-used. Some coal-fired and nuclear power plants located in coastal areas do make use of once-through ocean water. But even there, the offshore discharge water outlet requires very careful design to avoid environmental problems.

Petroleum refineries may also have very large cooling tower systems. A typical large refinery processing 40,000 metric tonnes of crude oil per day (300,000 barrels (48,000 m^{3}) per day) circulates about 80,000 cubic metres of water per hour through its cooling tower system.

The world's tallest cooling tower is the 210-metre (690 ft) cooling tower of the Pingshan II Power Station in Huaibei, Anhui Province, China.

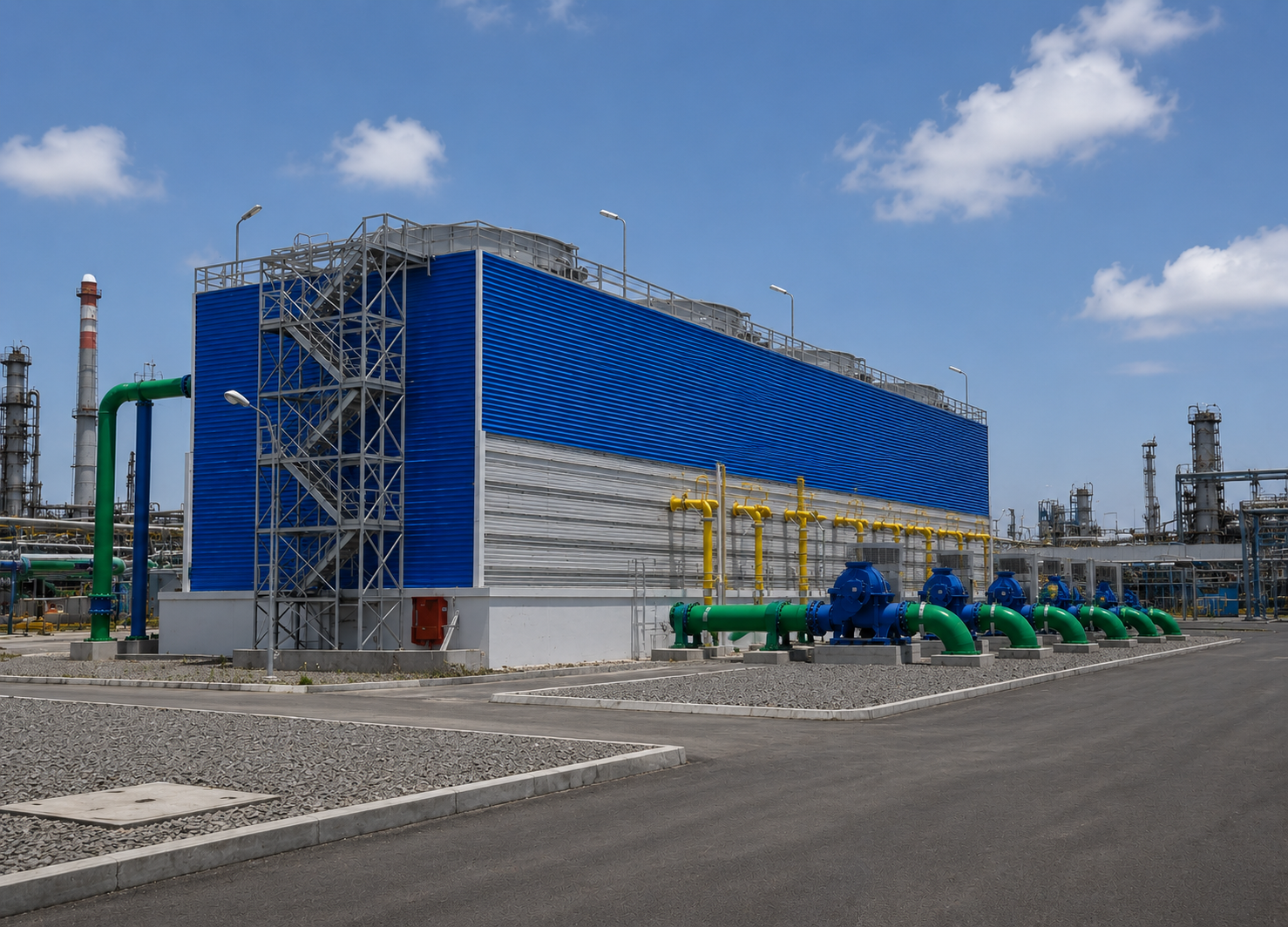
Field-erected cooling tower

== Classification by build ==
=== Package type ===
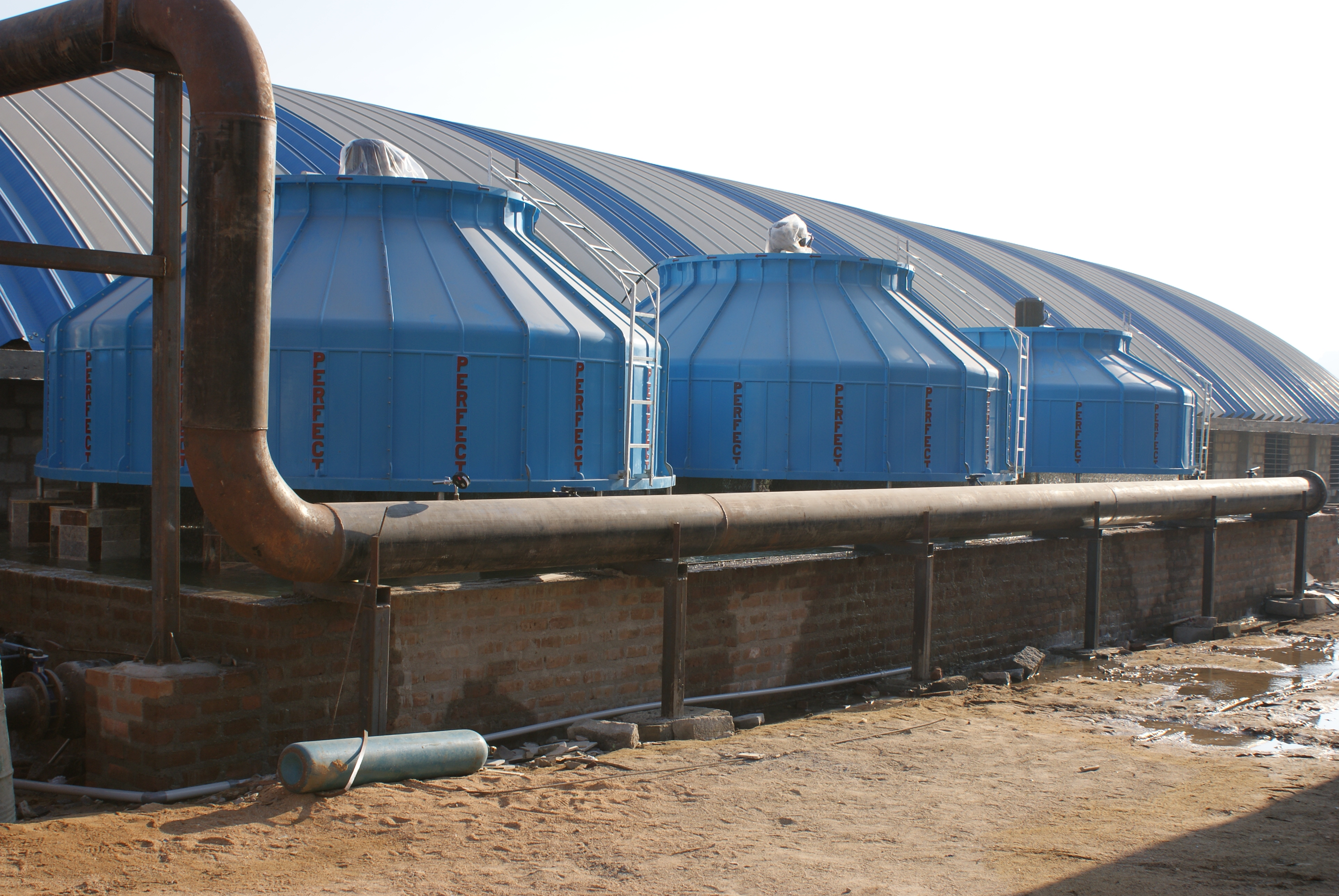
Field-erected cooling towers

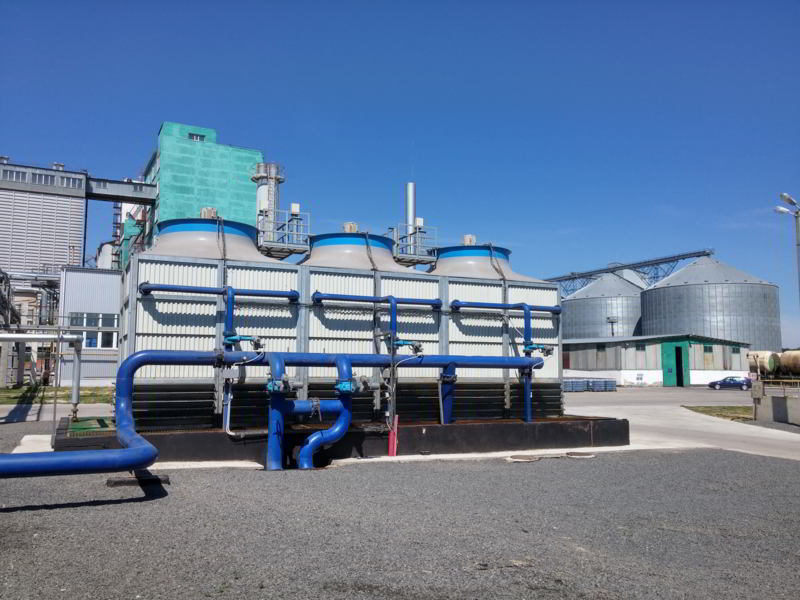
Brotep-Eco cooling tower

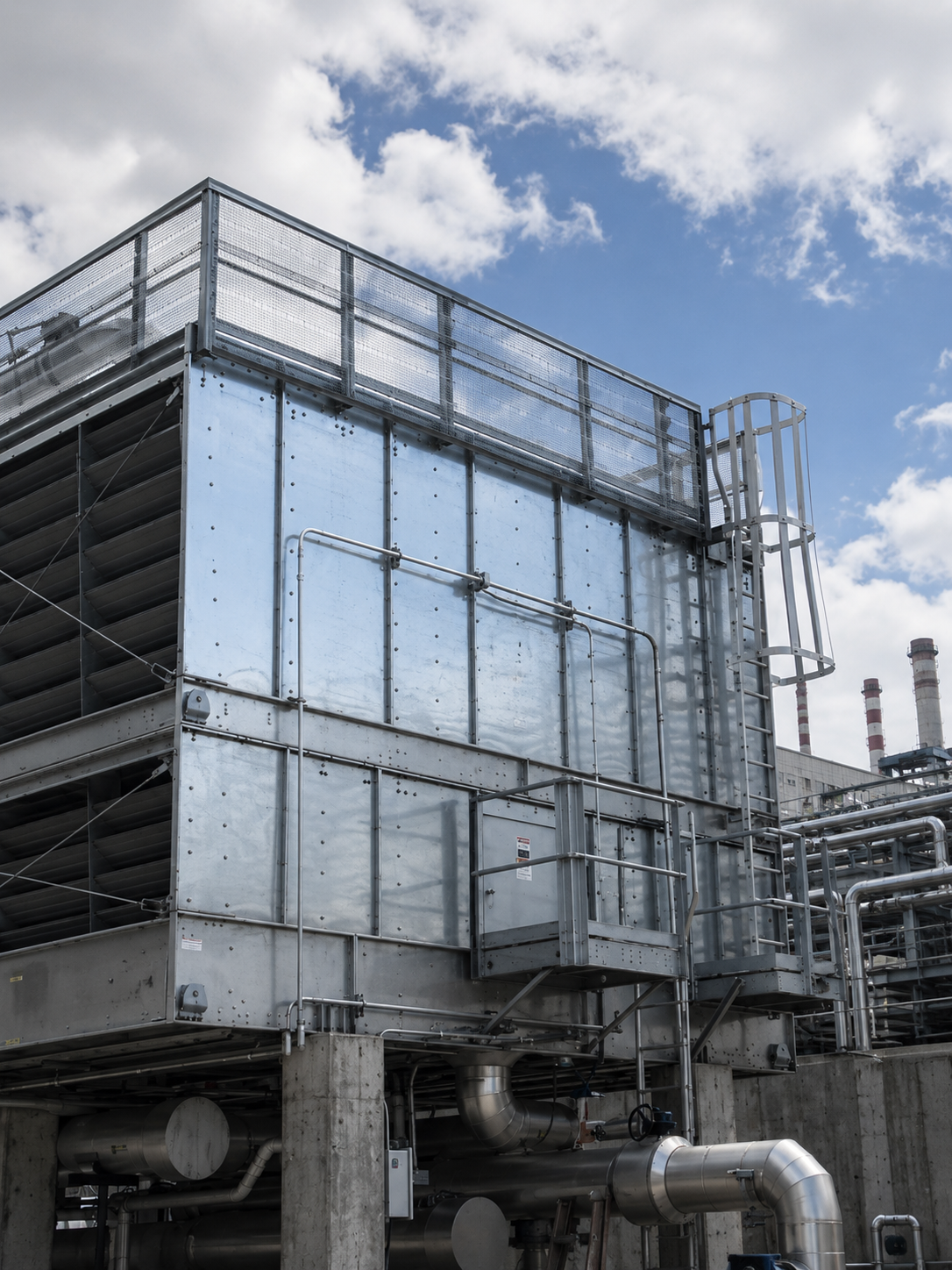
Package cooling tower

These types of cooling towers are factory preassembled, and can be simply transported on trucks, as they are compact machines. The capacity of package type towers is limited and, for that reason, they are usually preferred by facilities with low heat rejection requirements such as food processing plants, textile plants, some chemical processing plants, or buildings like hospitals, hotels, malls, automotive factories, etc. There are six types of package cooling towers: dry, closed wet, open wet, and three hybrid systems.

Due to their frequent use in or near residential areas, sound level control is a relatively more important issue for package type cooling towers.

=== Field-erected type ===
Facilities such as power plants, steel processing plants, petroleum refineries, or petrochemical plants usually install field-erected type cooling towers due to their greater capacity for heat rejection. Field-erected towers are usually much larger in size compared to the package type cooling towers.

A typical field-erected cooling tower has a pultruded fiber-reinforced plastic (FRP) structure, FRP cladding, a mechanical unit for air draft, and a drift eliminator.

== Heat transfer methods ==
With respect to the heat transfer mechanism employed, the main types are:

- Wet cooling towers or open-circuit cooling towers or evaporative cooling towers operate on the principle of evaporative cooling. The working coolant (usually water) is the evaporated fluid, and is exposed to the elements.
- Closed circuit cooling towers (also called fluid coolers) pass the working coolant through a large heat exchanger, usually a radiator, upon which clean water is sprayed and a fan-induced draft applied. The resulting heat transfer performance is close to that of a wet cooling tower, with the advantage of protecting the working fluid from environmental exposure and contamination.
- Adiabatic cooling towers spray water into the incoming air or onto a cardboard pad to cool the air before it passes over an air-cooled heat exchanger. Adiabatic cooling towers use less water than other cooling towers but do not cool the fluid as close to the wet bulb temperature. Most adiabatic cooling towers are also hybrid cooling towers.
- Dry cooling towers (or dry coolers) are closed circuit cooling towers which operate by heat transfer through a heat exchanger that separates the working coolant from ambient air, such as in a radiator, utilizing convective heat transfer. They do not use evaporation and are air-cooled heat exchangers.
- Hybrid cooling towers or wet-dry cooling towers are closed circuit cooling towers that can switch between wet or adiabatic and dry operation. This helps balance water and energy savings across a variety of weather conditions. Some hybrid cooling towers can switch between dry, wet, and adiabatic modes. Thermal efficiencies up to 92% have been observed in hybrid cooling towers.

In a wet cooling tower (or open circuit cooling tower), the warm water can be cooled to a temperature lower than the ambient air dry-bulb temperature, if the air is relatively dry (see dew point and psychrometrics). As ambient air is drawn past a flow of water, a small portion of the water evaporates, and the energy required to evaporate that portion of the water is taken from the remaining mass of water, thus reducing its temperature. Approximately 2,300 kilojoules per kilogram (970 BTU/lb) of heat energy is absorbed for the evaporated water. Evaporation results in saturated air conditions, lowering the temperature of the water processed by the tower to a value close to wet-bulb temperature, which is lower than the ambient dry-bulb temperature, the difference determined by the initial humidity of the ambient air.

To achieve better performance (more cooling), a medium called fill is used to increase the surface area and the time of contact between the air and water flows. Splash fill consists of material placed to interrupt the water flow, causing splashing. Film fill is composed of thin sheets of material (usually PVC) upon which the water flows. Both methods create increased surface area and time of contact between the fluid (water) and the gas (air), to improve heat transfer.

== Air flow generation methods ==
Cooling towers can be classified according to how air is moved through the tower. The principal arrangements are natural draft, mechanical draft, and fan-assisted natural draft.

- Natural draft cooling towers rely on the difference in density between the warmer, humidified air inside the tower and the cooler ambient air outside. As heat is transferred from the circulating water to the air, the warmed air rises through the tower and draws additional ambient air in through openings near the base.

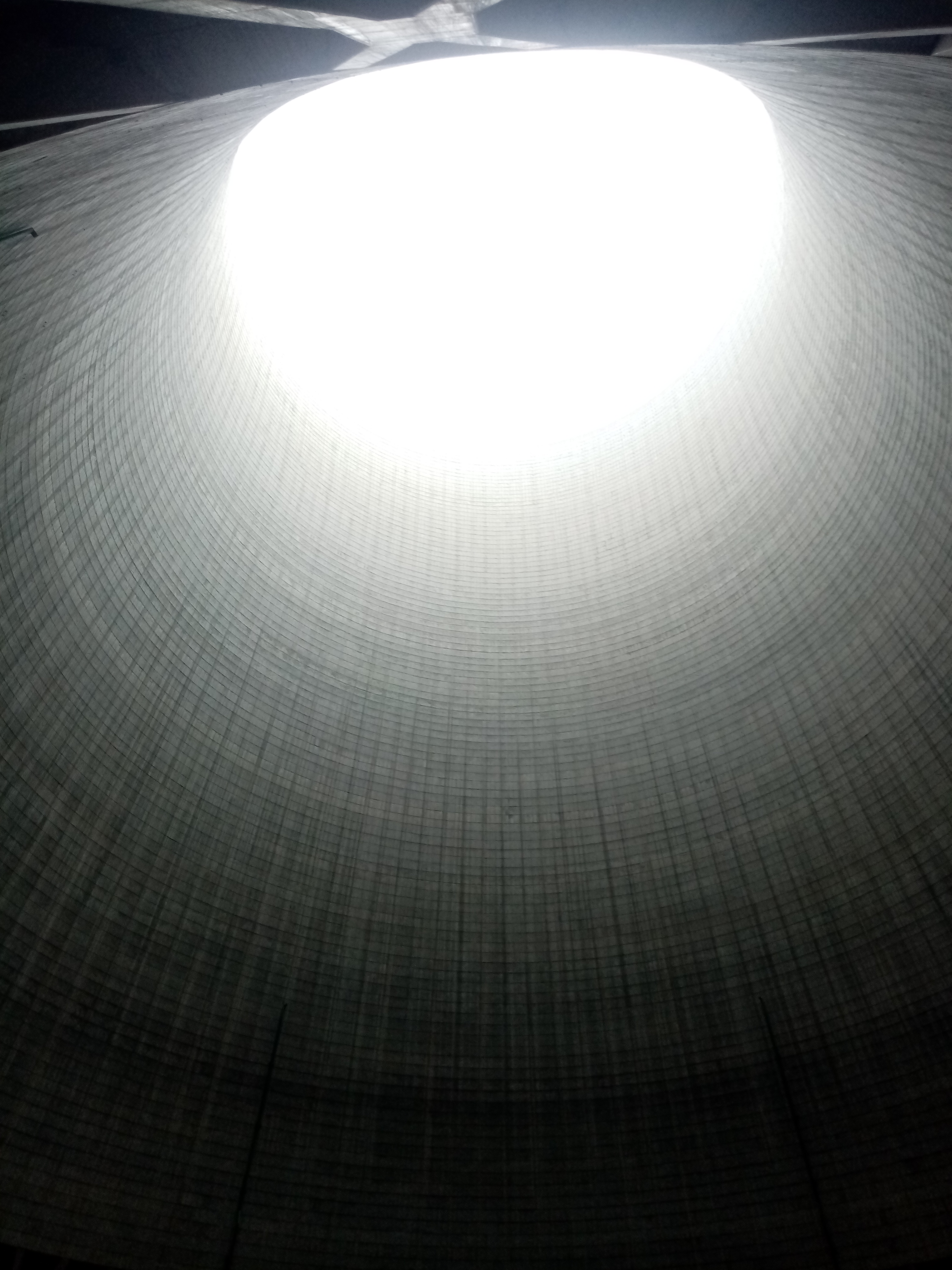
Inside a natural-draft cooling tower

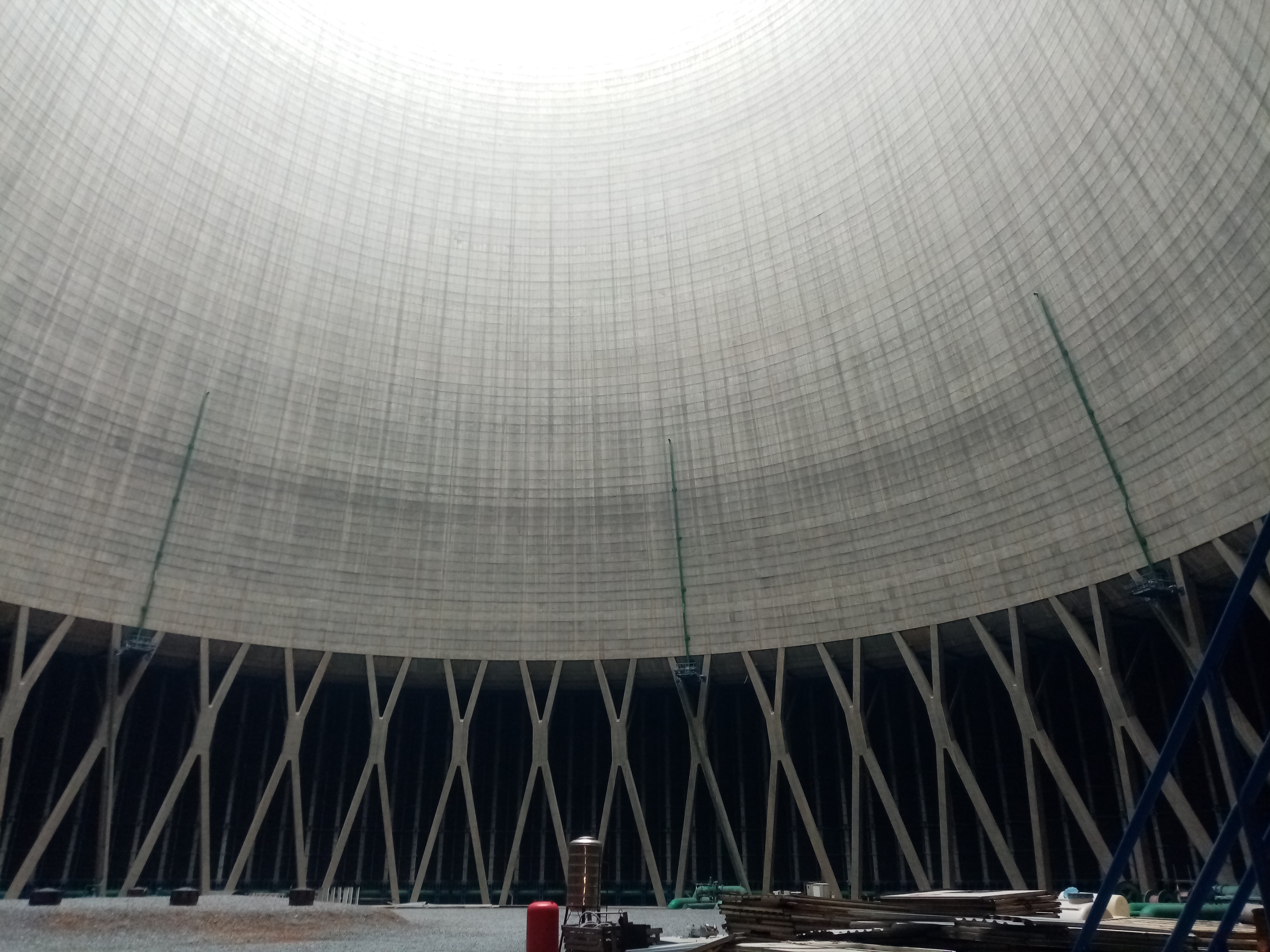
Interior of a natural-draft cooling tower at a gas-fired power plant in Gebze, Turkey

- Mechanical-draft cooling towers use one or more fans to move air through the tower. The fans may be positioned at the air inlet or at the air outlet.
  - Induced draft towers have one or more fans at the air outlet, which draw air through the tower. Induced-draft arrangements can be used with either counterflow or crossflow configurations.
  - Forced draft towers have one or more fans at the air inlet, which push air through the tower. Forced-draft arrangements normally have relatively high air velocity at the inlet and lower discharge velocity, making recirculation of warm exhaust air a greater design consideration than in comparable induced-draft arrangements.
- Fan-assisted natural draft towers combine buoyancy-driven natural draft with mechanical fans that increase airflow when required. The fans can reduce the tower height required for a given duty while retaining part of the airflow produced by natural draft.

=== Hyperboloid cooling tower ===
Large natural-draft cooling towers are commonly constructed as reinforced-concrete hyperboloid shells. The shape combines the chimney effect required to produce natural airflow with structural advantages for very tall, thin shells.

The reinforced-concrete hyperboloid cooling-tower design was developed in the early twentieth century by Dutch engineers Frederik van Iterson and Gerard Kuypers. Their design used a thin, double-curved reinforced-concrete shell without the internal structural supports required by many earlier tower forms. The first towers based on the design were constructed at the Emma state mine in the Netherlands between 1917 and 1918.

A related United States patent filed by Kuypers in 1917 describes a reinforced-concrete cooling tower with a continuous curved wall designed to resist wind pressure without internal supporting or reinforcing structures.

The hyperboloid form also reduces the amount of structural material required compared with a cylindrical shell designed to provide a similar natural draft, while improving resistance to wind loading. Computational studies of hyperboloid cooling towers have also found that tower geometry influences air velocity and heat-transfer performance, with the throat diameter and curvature affecting natural-draft performance.

Hyperboloid cooling towers are often visually associated with nuclear power plants, but the structure is not specific to nuclear generation. Natural-draft cooling towers are also used at coal-fired and other large thermal power stations. Nuclear power plants themselves use several different cooling arrangements, including natural-draft towers, mechanical-draft towers, cooling ponds and once-through cooling systems.

== Categorization by air-to-water flow ==
=== Crossflow ===

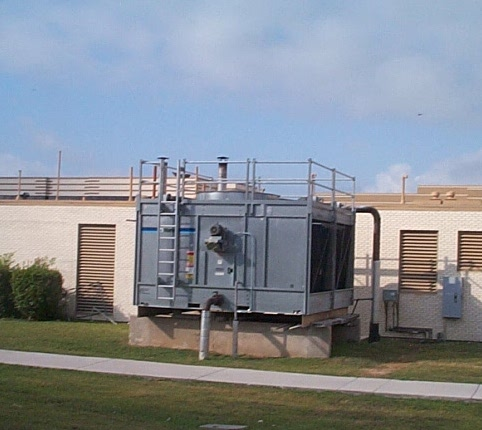
Mechanical draft crossflow cooling tower used in an HVAC application

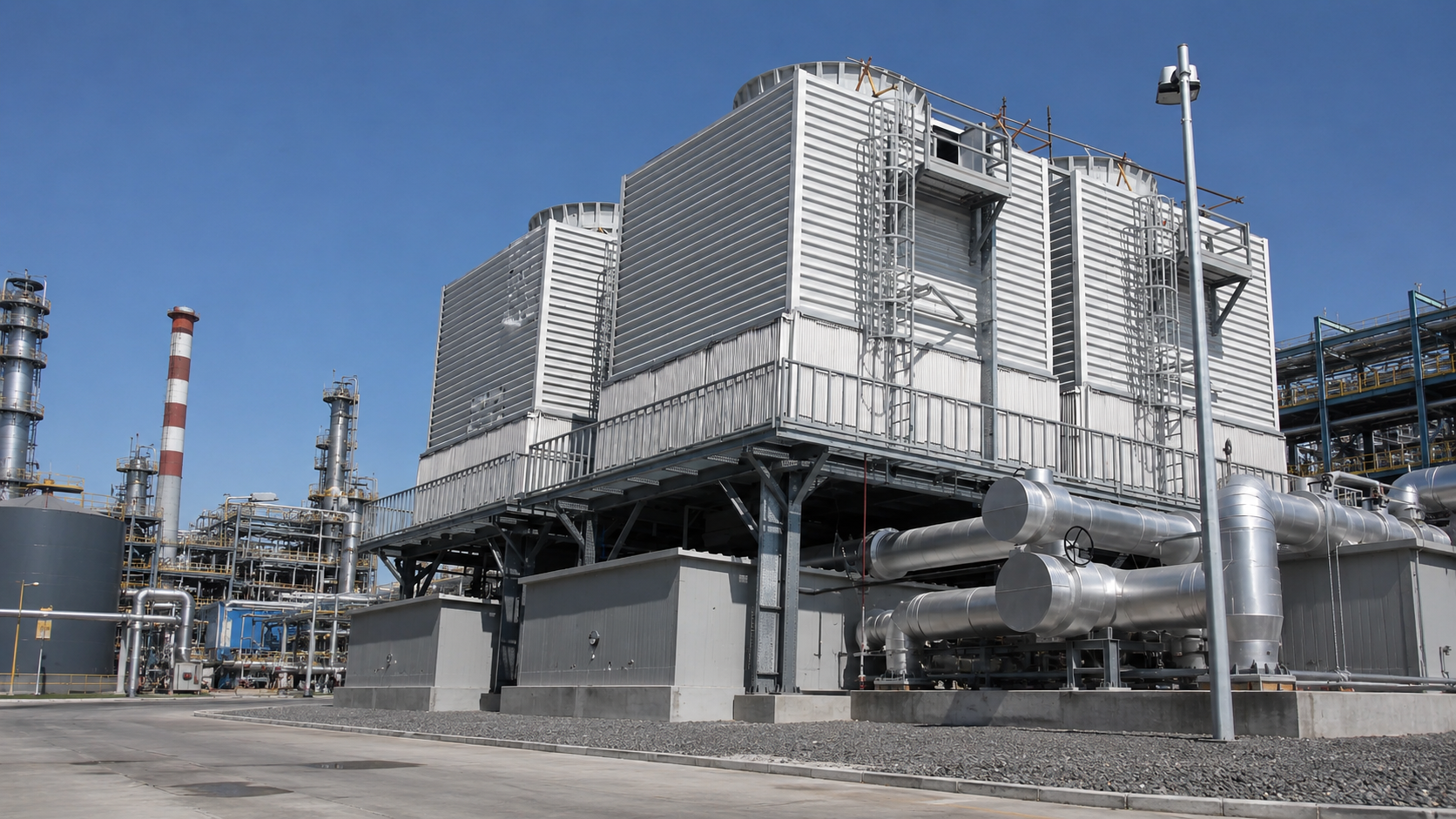
Industrial Cooling and Pipeline Facility

Crossflow is a design in which the airflow is directed perpendicular to the water flow (see diagram at left). Airflow enters one or more vertical faces of the cooling tower to meet the fill material. Water flows (perpendicular to the air) through the fill by gravity. The air continues through the fill and thus past the water flow into an open plenum volume. Lastly, a fan forces the air out into the atmosphere.

A distribution or hot water basin consisting of a deep pan with holes or nozzles in its bottom is located near the top of a crossflow tower. Gravity distributes the water through the nozzles uniformly across the fill material. Cross Flow V/s Counter Flow

Advantages of the crossflow design:

- Gravity water distribution allows smaller pumps and maintenance while in use.
- Non-pressurized spray simplifies variable flow.
- Typically lower initial and long-term cost, mostly due to pump requirements.

Disadvantages of the crossflow design:

- More prone to freezing than counterflow designs.
- Variable flow is useless in some conditions.
- More prone to dirt buildup in the fill than counterflow designs, especially in dusty or sandy areas.

=== Counterflow ===
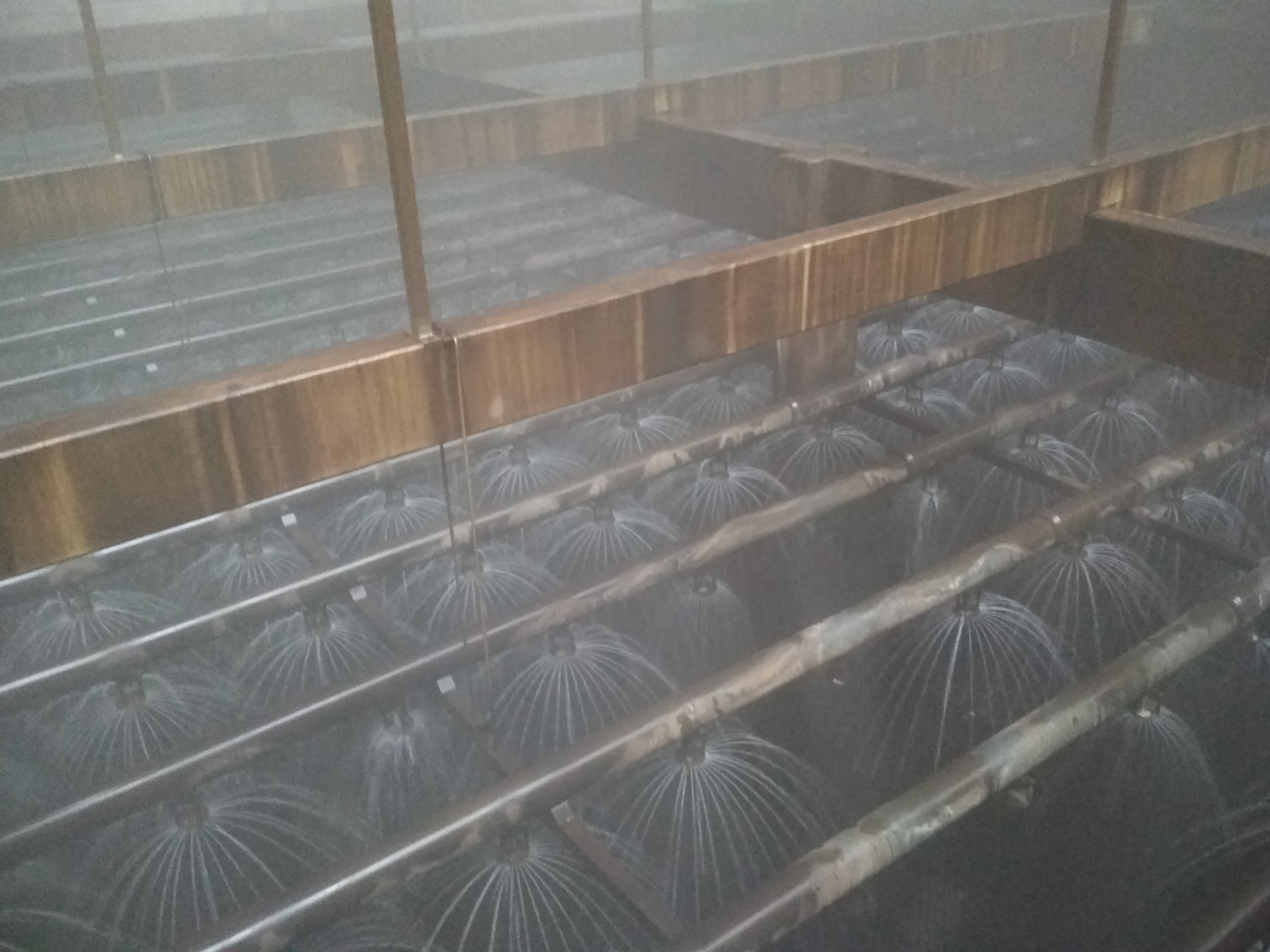
Showers inside cooling tower

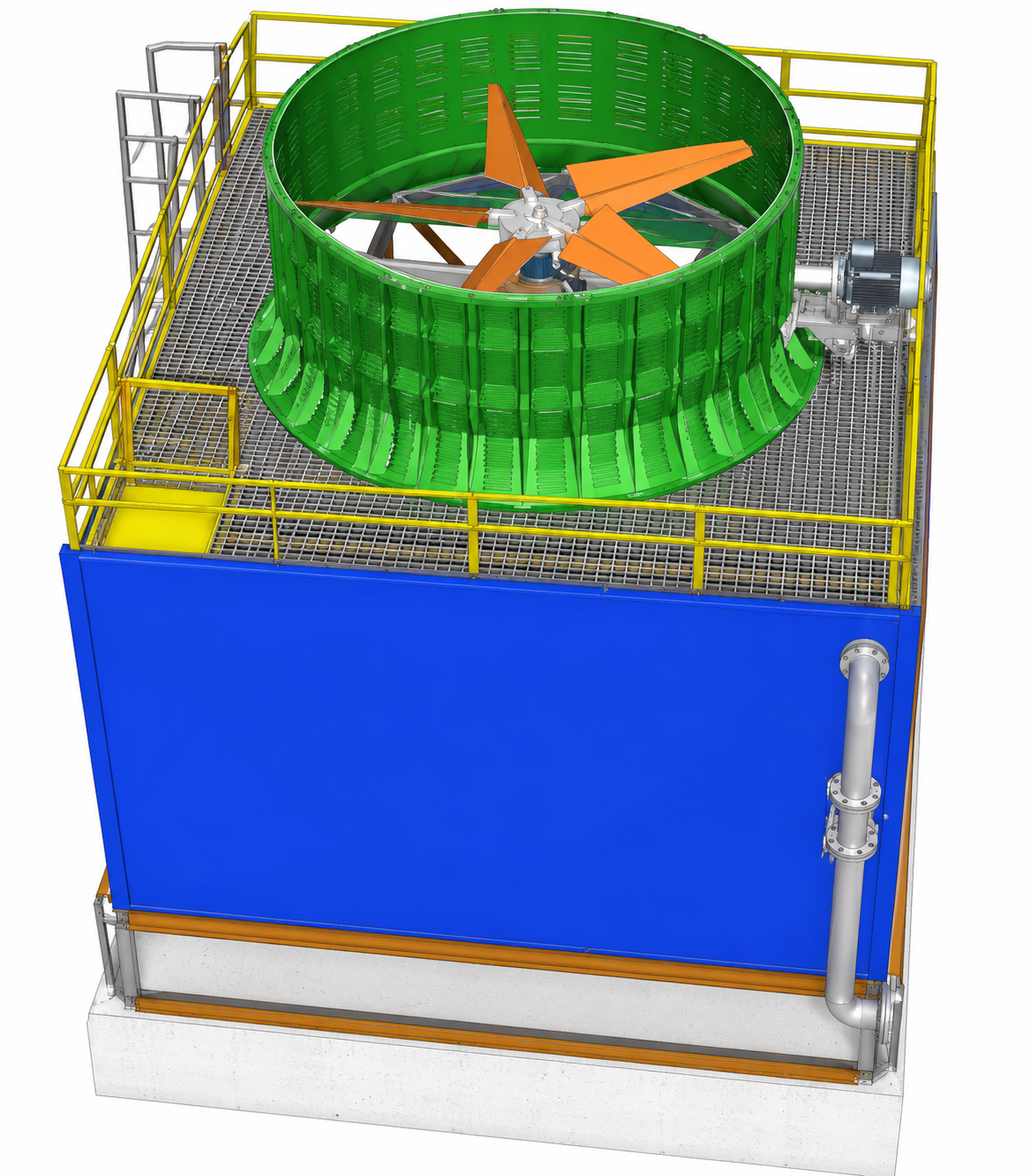
Forced-draft counter-flow package-type cooling tower

In a counterflow design, the air flow is directly opposite to the water flow (see diagram at left). Air flow first enters an open area beneath the fill media, and is then drawn up vertically. The water is sprayed through pressurized nozzles near the top of the tower, and then flows downward through the fill, opposite to the air flow.

Advantages of the counterflow design:

- Spray water distribution makes the tower more freeze-resistant.
- Breakup of water in spray makes heat transfer more efficient.

Disadvantages of the counterflow design:

- Typically higher initial and long-term cost, primarily due to pump requirements.
- Difficult to use variable water flow, as spray characteristics may be negatively affected.
- Typically noisier, due to the greater water fall height from the bottom of the fill into the cold water basin

=== Common aspects ===
Common aspects of both designs:

- The interactions of the air and water flow allow a partial equalization of temperature, and evaporation of water.
- The air, now saturated with water vapor, is discharged from the top of the cooling tower.
- A "collection basin" or "cold water basin" is used to collect and contain the cooled water after its interaction with the air flow.

Both crossflow and counterflow designs can be used in natural draft and in mechanical draft cooling towers.

== Wet cooling tower material balance ==
Quantitatively, the material balance around a wet, evaporative cooling tower system is governed by the operational variables of make-up volumetric flow rate, evaporation and windage losses, draw-off rate, and the concentration cycles.

In the adjacent diagram, water pumped from the tower basin is the cooling water routed through the process coolers and condensers in an industrial facility. The cool water absorbs heat from the hot process streams which need to be cooled or condensed, and the absorbed heat warms the circulating water (C). The warm water returns to the top of the cooling tower and trickles downward over the fill material inside the tower. As it trickles down, it contacts ambient air rising up through the tower either by natural draft or by forced draft using large fans in the tower. That contact causes a small amount of the water to be lost as windage or drift (W) and some of the water (E) to evaporate. The heat required to evaporate the water is derived from the water itself, which cools the water back to the original basin water temperature and the water is then ready to recirculate. The evaporated water leaves its dissolved salts behind in the bulk of the water which has not been evaporated, thus raising the salt concentration in the circulating cooling water. To prevent the salt concentration of the water from becoming too high, a portion of the water is drawn off or blown down (D) for disposal. Fresh water make-up (M) is supplied to the tower basin to compensate for the loss of evaporated water, the windage loss water and the draw-off water.

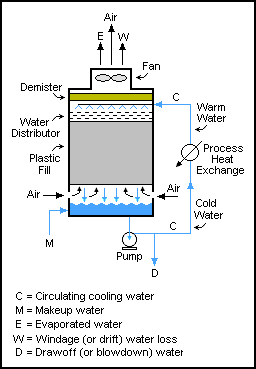
Fan-induced draft, counter-flow cooling tower

Using these flow rates and concentration dimensional units:

| M | = Make-up water in m^{3}/h |
| C | = Circulating water in m^{3}/h |
| D | = Draw-off water in m^{3}/h |
| E | = Evaporated water in m^{3}/h |
| W | = Windage loss of water in m^{3}/h |
| X | = Concentration in ppmw (of any completely soluble salts ... usually chlorides) |
| X_{M} | = Concentration of chlorides in make-up water (M), in ppmw |
| X_{C} | = Concentration of chlorides in circulating water (C), in ppmw |
| Cycles | = Cycles of concentration = X_{C} / X_{M} (dimensionless) |
| ppmw | = parts per million by weight |

A water balance around the entire system is then:

M = E + D + W

Since the evaporated water (E) has no salts, a chloride balance around the system is:

MX_{M} = DX_{C} + WX_{C} = X_{C}(D + W)
$$M X_M = D X_C + W X_C = X_C (D + W)$$

and, therefore:

$${X_C \over X_M} = \text{Cycles of concentration} ={ M \over (D + W)} = {M \over (M - E)} = 1 + {E \over (D + W)}$$

From a simplified heat balance around the cooling tower:

$$E = {C \Delta T c_p \over H_V}$$

| where: |
| H_{V} | = latent heat of vaporization of water = 2260 kJ / kg |
| ΔT | = water temperature difference from tower top to tower bottom, in °C |
| c_{p} | = specific heat of water = 4.184 kJ / (kg$\cdot$°C) |

Windage (or drift) losses (W) is the amount of total tower water flow that is entrained in the flow of air to the atmosphere. From large-scale industrial cooling towers, in the absence of manufacturer's data, it may be assumed to be:

W = 0.3 to 1.0 percent of C for a natural draft cooling tower without windage drift eliminators
W = 0.1 to 0.3 percent of C for an induced draft cooling tower without windage drift eliminators
W = about 0.005 percent of C (or less) if the cooling tower has windage drift eliminators
W = about 0.0005 percent of C (or less) if the cooling tower has windage drift eliminators and uses sea water as make-up water.

=== Cycles of concentration ===
Cycle of concentration represents the accumulation of dissolved minerals in the recirculating cooling water. Discharge of draw-off (or blowdown) is used principally to control the buildup of these minerals.

The chemistry of the make-up water, including the amount of dissolved minerals, can vary widely. Make-up waters low in dissolved minerals such as those from surface water supplies (lakes, rivers etc.) tend to be aggressive to metals (corrosive). Make-up waters from ground water supplies (such as wells) are usually higher in minerals, and tend to be scaling (deposit minerals). Increasing the amount of minerals present in the water by cycling can make water less aggressive to piping; however, excessive levels of minerals can cause scaling problems.

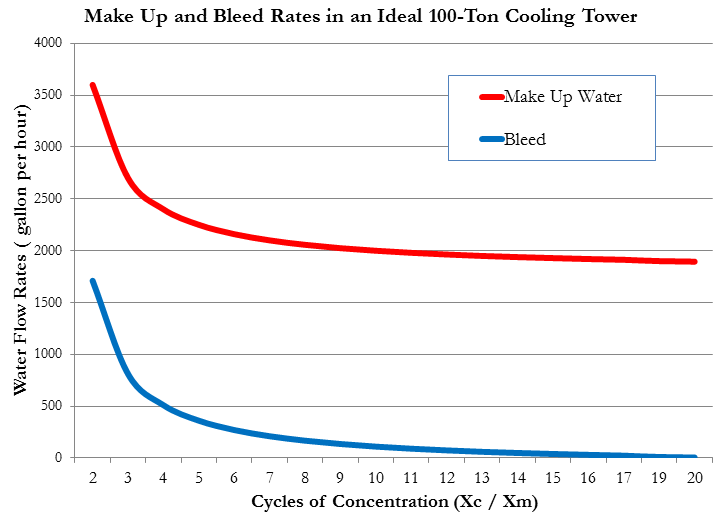
Relationship between cycles of concentration and flow rates in a cooling tower

As the cycles of concentration increase, the water may not be able to hold the minerals in solution. When the solubility of these minerals have been exceeded they can precipitate out as mineral solids and cause fouling and heat exchange problems in the cooling tower or the heat exchangers. The temperatures of the recirculating water, piping and heat exchange surfaces determine if and where minerals will precipitate from the recirculating water. Often a professional water treatment consultant will evaluate the make-up water and the operating conditions of the cooling tower and recommend an appropriate range for the cycles of concentration. The use of water treatment chemicals, pretreatment such as water softening, pH adjustment, and other techniques can affect the acceptable range of cycles of concentration.

Concentration cycles in the majority of cooling towers usually range from 3 to 7. In the United States, many water supplies use well water which has significant levels of dissolved solids. On the other hand, one of the largest water supplies, for New York City, has a surface rainwater source quite low in minerals; thus cooling towers in that city are often allowed to concentrate to 7 or more cycles of concentration.

Since higher cycles of concentration represent less make-up water, water conservation efforts may focus on increasing cycles of concentration. Highly treated recycled water may be an effective means of reducing cooling tower consumption of potable water, in regions where potable water is scarce.

== Maintenance ==
Clean visible dirt & debris from the cold water basin and surfaces with any visible biofilm (i.e., slime).

Disinfectant and other chemical levels in cooling towers and hot tubs should be continuously maintained and regularly monitored.

Regular checks of water quality (specifically the aerobic bacteria levels) using dipslides should be taken as the presence of other organisms can support legionella by producing the organic nutrients that it needs to thrive.

=== Water treatment ===
Besides treating the circulating cooling water in large industrial cooling tower systems to minimize scaling and fouling, the water should be filtered to remove particulates, and also be dosed with biocides and algaecides to prevent growths that could interfere with the continuous flow of the water. Under certain conditions, a biofilm of micro-organisms such as bacteria, fungi and algae can grow very rapidly in the cooling water, and can reduce the heat transfer efficiency of the cooling tower. Biofilm can be reduced or prevented by using sodium chlorite or other chlorine based chemicals. A normal industrial practice is to use two biocides, such as oxidizing and non-oxidizing types to complement each other's strengths and weaknesses, and to ensure a broader spectrum of attack. In most cases, a continual low level oxidizing biocide is used, then alternating to a periodic shock dose of non-oxidizing biocides.

==== Algaecides and biocides ====
Algaecides, as their name might suggest, are intended to kill algae and other related plant-like microbes in the water. Biocides can reduce other living matter that remains, improving the system, keeping the water clean and ensuring efficient water usage. One of the most common options for biocides in cooling towers is bromine.

==== Scale inhibitors ====
Scaling is among the issues that cause the most damage and strain to a water tower's systems. When an unwanted material or contaminant in the water builds up in a certain area, it can create deposits that grow over time. This can cause issues ranging from the narrowing of pipes to total blockages and equipment failures.

Cooling towers may lose water due to drift, bleed-off, and evaporation loss. This lost water is replenished with make-up water, which additionally makes machinery and equipment run safely and stably.

==== Legionnaires' disease ====
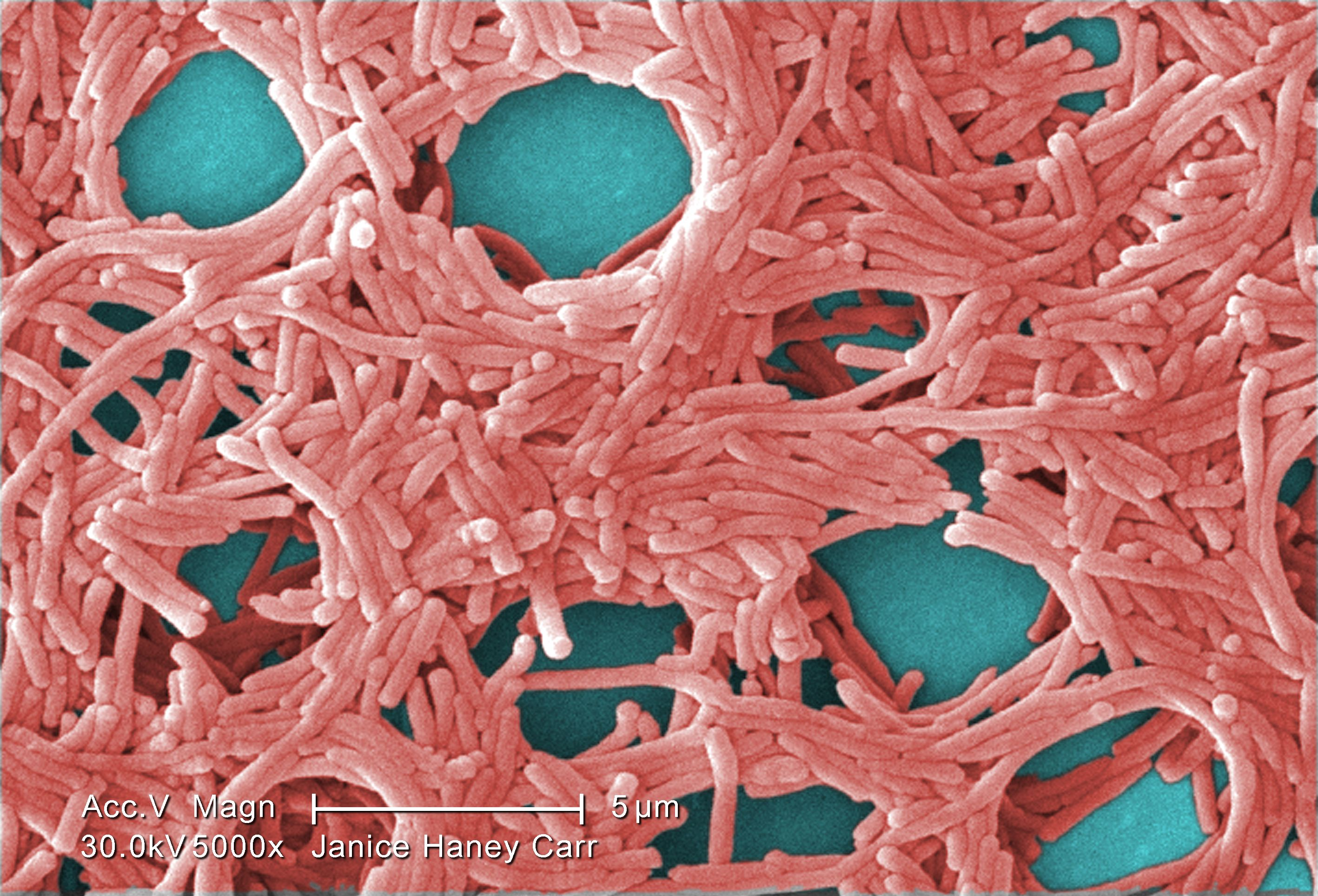
Legionella pneumophila (5000 × magnification)

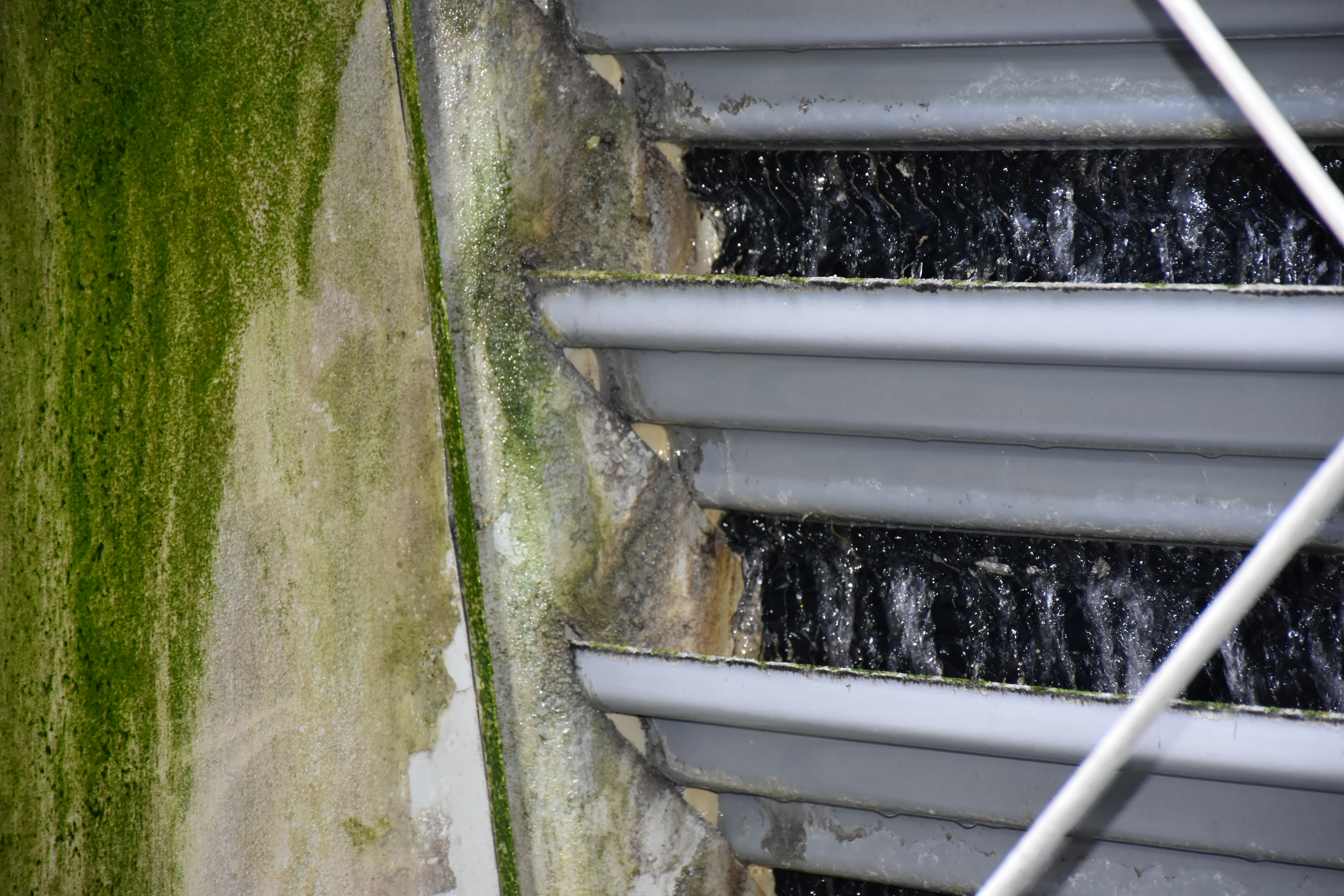
A multitude of microscopic organisms such as bacterial colonies, fungi, and algae can easily thrive within the moderately high temperatures present inside a cooling tower.

Another very important reason for using biocides in cooling towers is to prevent the growth of Legionella, including species that cause legionellosis or Legionnaires' disease, most notably L. pneumophila or Mycobacterium avium. The various Legionella species are the cause of Legionnaires' disease in humans and transmission is via exposure to aerosols—the inhalation of mist droplets containing the bacteria. Common sources of Legionella include cooling towers used in open recirculating evaporative cooling water systems, domestic hot water systems, fountains, and similar disseminators that tap into a public water supply. Natural sources include freshwater ponds and creeks.

French researchers found that Legionella bacteria travelled up to 6 kilometres (3.7 mi) through the air from a large contaminated cooling tower at a petrochemical plant in Pas-de-Calais, France. That outbreak killed 21 of the 86 people who had a laboratory-confirmed infection.

Drift (or windage) is the term for water droplets of the process flow allowed to escape in the cooling tower discharge. Drift eliminators are used in order to hold drift rates typically to 0.001–0.005% of the circulating flow rate. A typical drift eliminator provides multiple directional changes of airflow to prevent the escape of water droplets. A well-designed and well-fitted drift eliminator can greatly reduce water loss and potential for Legionella or water treatment chemical exposure. Also, about every six months, inspect the conditions of the drift eliminators making sure there are no gaps to allow the free flow of dirt.

The US Centers for Disease Control and Prevention (CDC) does not recommend that health-care facilities regularly test for the Legionella pneumophila bacteria. Scheduled microbiologic monitoring for Legionella remains controversial because its presence is not necessarily evidence of a potential for causing disease. The CDC recommends aggressive disinfection measures for cleaning and maintaining devices known to transmit Legionella, but does not recommend regularly scheduled microbiologic assays for the bacteria. However, scheduled monitoring of potable water within a hospital might be considered in certain settings where persons are highly susceptible to illness and mortality from Legionella infection (e.g. hematopoietic stem cell transplantation units, or solid organ transplant units). Also, after an outbreak of legionellosis, health officials agree that monitoring is necessary to identify the source and to evaluate the efficacy of biocides or other prevention measures.

Studies have found Legionella in 40% to 60% of cooling towers.

== Terminology ==
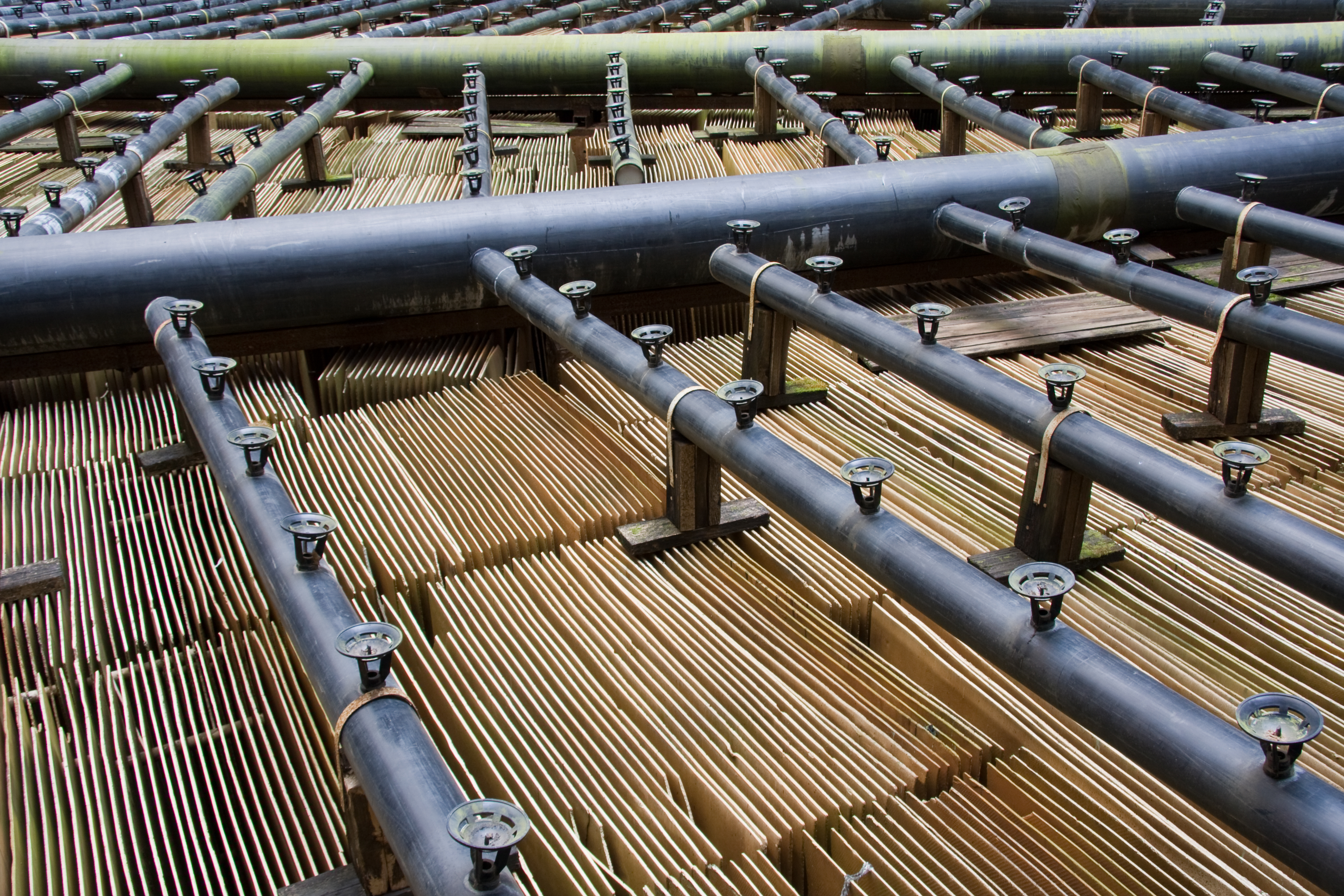
Fill plates at the bottom of the Iru Power Plant cooling tower (Estonia). Tower is shut down, revealing numerous water spray heads.

- Windage or drift – Water droplets that are carried out of the cooling tower with the exhaust air. Drift droplets have the same concentration of impurities as the water entering the tower. The drift rate is typically reduced by employing baffle-like devices, called drift eliminators, through which the air must travel after leaving the fill and spray zones of the tower. Drift can also be reduced by using warmer entering cooling tower temperatures.

- Blow-out – Water droplets blown out of the cooling tower by wind, generally at the air inlet openings. Water may also be lost, in the absence of wind, through splashing or misting. Devices such as wind screens, louvers, splash deflectors and water diverters are used to limit these losses.

- Plume – The stream of saturated exhaust air leaving the cooling tower. The plume is visible when water vapor it contains condenses in contact with cooler ambient air, like the saturated air in one's breath fogs on a cold day. Under certain conditions, a cooling tower plume may present fogging or icing hazards to its surroundings. Note that the water evaporated in the cooling process is "pure" water, in contrast to the very small percentage of drift droplets or water blown out of the air inlets.

- Draw-off or blow-down – The portion of the circulating water flow that is removed (usually discharged to a drain) in order to maintain the amount of total dissolved solids (TDS) and other impurities at an acceptably low level. Higher TDS concentration in solution may result from greater cooling tower efficiency. However the higher the TDS concentration, the greater the risk of scale, biological growth, and corrosion. The amount of blow-down is primarily regulated by measuring by the electrical conductivity of the circulating water. Biological growth, scaling, and corrosion can be prevented by chemicals (respectively, biocide, sulfuric acid, corrosion inhibitor). On the other hand, the only practical way to decrease the electrical conductivity is by increasing the amount of blow-down discharge and subsequently increasing the amount of clean make-up water.

- Zero bleed for cooling towers, also called zero blow-down for cooling towers, is a process for significantly reducing the need for bleeding water with residual solids from the system by enabling the water to hold more solids in solution.

- Make-up – The water that must be added to the circulating water system in order to compensate for water losses such as evaporation, drift loss, blow-out, blow-down, etc.

- Noise – Sound energy emitted by a cooling tower and heard (recorded) at a given distance and direction. The sound is generated by the impact of falling water, by the movement of air by fans, the fan blades moving in the structure, vibration of the structure, and the motors, gearboxes or drive belts.

- Approach – The approach is the difference in temperature between the cooled-water temperature and the entering-air wet bulb temperature (twb). Since the cooling towers are based on the principles of evaporative cooling, the maximum cooling tower efficiency depends on the wet bulb temperature of the air. The wet-bulb temperature is a type of temperature measurement that reflects the physical properties of a system with a mixture of a gas and a vapor, usually air and water vapor

- Range – The range is the temperature difference between the warm water inlet and cooled water exit.

- Fill – Inside the tower, fills are added to increase contact surface as well as contact time between air and water, to provide better heat transfer. The efficiency of the tower depends on the selection and amount of fill. There are two types of fills that may be used:
  - Film type fill (causes water to spread into a thin film)
  - Splash type fill (breaks up falling stream of water and interrupts its vertical progress)

- Full-flow filtration – Full-flow filtration continuously strains particulates out of the entire system flow. For example, in a 100-ton system, the flow rate would be roughly 300 gal/min. A filter would be selected to accommodate the entire 300 gal/min flow rate. In this case, the filter typically is installed after the cooling tower on the discharge side of the pump. While this is the ideal method of filtration, for higher flow systems it may be cost-prohibitive.

- Side-stream filtration – Side-stream filtration, although popular and effective, does not provide complete protection. With side-stream filtration, a portion of the water is filtered continuously. This method works on the principle that continuous particle removal will keep the system clean. Manufacturers typically package side-stream filters on a skid, complete with a pump and controls. For high flow systems, this method is cost-effective. Properly sizing a side-stream filtration system is critical to obtain satisfactory filter performance, but there is some debate over how to properly size the side-stream system. Many engineers size the system to continuously filter the cooling tower basin water at a rate equivalent to 10% of the total circulation flow rate. For example, if the total flow of a system is 1,200 gal/min (a 400-ton system), a 120 gal/min side-stream system is specified.

- Cycle of concentration – Maximum allowed multiplier for the amount of miscellaneous substances in circulating water compared to the amount of those substances in make-up water.

- Treated timber – A structural material for cooling towers which was largely abandoned in the early 2000s. It is still used occasionally due to its low initial costs, in spite of its short life expectancy. The life of treated timber varies a lot, depending on the operating conditions of the tower, such as frequency of shutdowns, treatment of the circulating water, etc. Under proper working conditions, the estimated life of treated timber structural members is about 10 years.

- Leaching – The loss of wood preservative chemicals by the washing action of the water flowing through a wood structure cooling tower.

- Pultruded FRP – A common structural material for smaller cooling towers, fibre-reinforced plastic (FRP) is known for its high corrosion-resistance capabilities. Pultruded FRP is produced using pultrusion technology, and has become the most common structural material for small cooling towers. It offers lower costs and requires less maintenance compared to reinforced concrete, which is still in use for large structures.

== Fog production ==
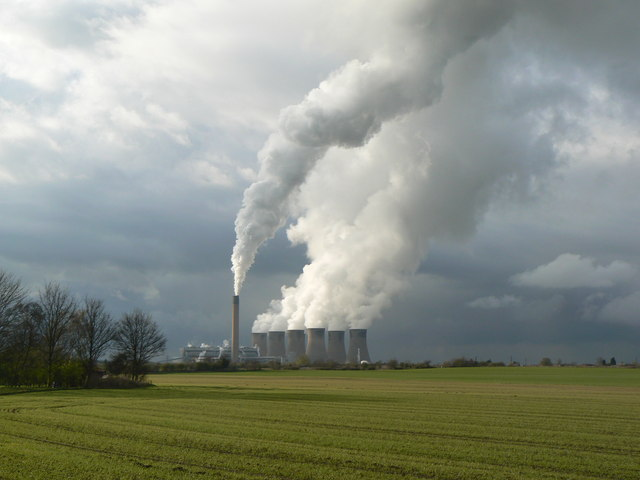
Fog produced by Eggborough power station in North Yorkshire; the towers have since been demolished

Under certain ambient conditions, plumes of water vapor can be seen rising out of the discharge from a cooling tower, and can be mistaken as smoke from a fire. If the outdoor air is at or near saturation, and the tower adds more water to the air, saturated air with liquid water droplets can be discharged, which is seen as fog. This phenomenon typically occurs on cool, humid days, but is rare in many climates. Fog and clouds associated with cooling towers can be described as homogenitus, as with other clouds of man-made origin, such as contrails and ship tracks.

This phenomenon can be prevented by decreasing the relative humidity of the saturated discharge air. For that purpose, in hybrid towers, saturated discharge air is mixed with heated low relative humidity air. Some air enters the tower above drift eliminator level, passing through heat exchangers. The relative humidity of the dry air is even more decreased instantly as being heated while entering the tower. The discharged mixture has a relatively lower relative humidity and the fog is invisible.

== Cloud formation ==
Issues related to applied meteorology of cooling towers, including the assessment of the impact of cooling towers on cloud enhancement were considered in a series of models and experiments. One of the results by Haman's group indicated significant dynamic influences of the condensation trails on the surrounding atmosphere, manifested in temperature and humidity disturbances. The mechanism of these influences seemed to be associated either with the airflow over the trail as an obstacle or with vertical waves generated by the trail, often at a considerable altitude above it.

== Salt emission pollution ==
When wet cooling towers with seawater make-up are installed in various industries located in or near coastal areas, the drift of fine droplets emitted from the cooling towers contain nearly 6% sodium chloride which deposits on the nearby land areas. This deposition of sodium salts on the nearby agriculture and vegetative lands can convert them into sodic saline or sodic alkaline soils depending on the nature of the soil and enhance the sodicity of ground and surface water. The salt deposition problem from such cooling towers aggravates where pollution control standards are not imposed or not implemented to minimize the drift emissions from wet cooling towers using seawater make-up.

Respirable suspended particulate matter, of less than 10 micrometers (μm) in size, can be present in the drift from cooling towers. Larger particles above 10 μm in size are generally filtered out in the nose and throat via cilia and mucus but particulate matter smaller than 10 μm, referred to as PM_{10}, can settle in the bronchi and lungs and cause health problems. Similarly, particles smaller than 2.5 μm, (PM_{2.5}), tend to penetrate into the gas exchange regions of the lung, and very small particles (less than 100 nanometers) may pass through the lungs to affect other organs. Though the total particulate emissions from wet cooling towers with fresh water make-up is much less, they contain more PM_{10} and PM_{2.5} than the total emissions from wet cooling towers with sea water make-up. This is due to lesser salt content in fresh water drift (below 2,000 ppm) compared to the salt content of sea water drift (60,000 ppm).

== Use as a flue-gas stack ==
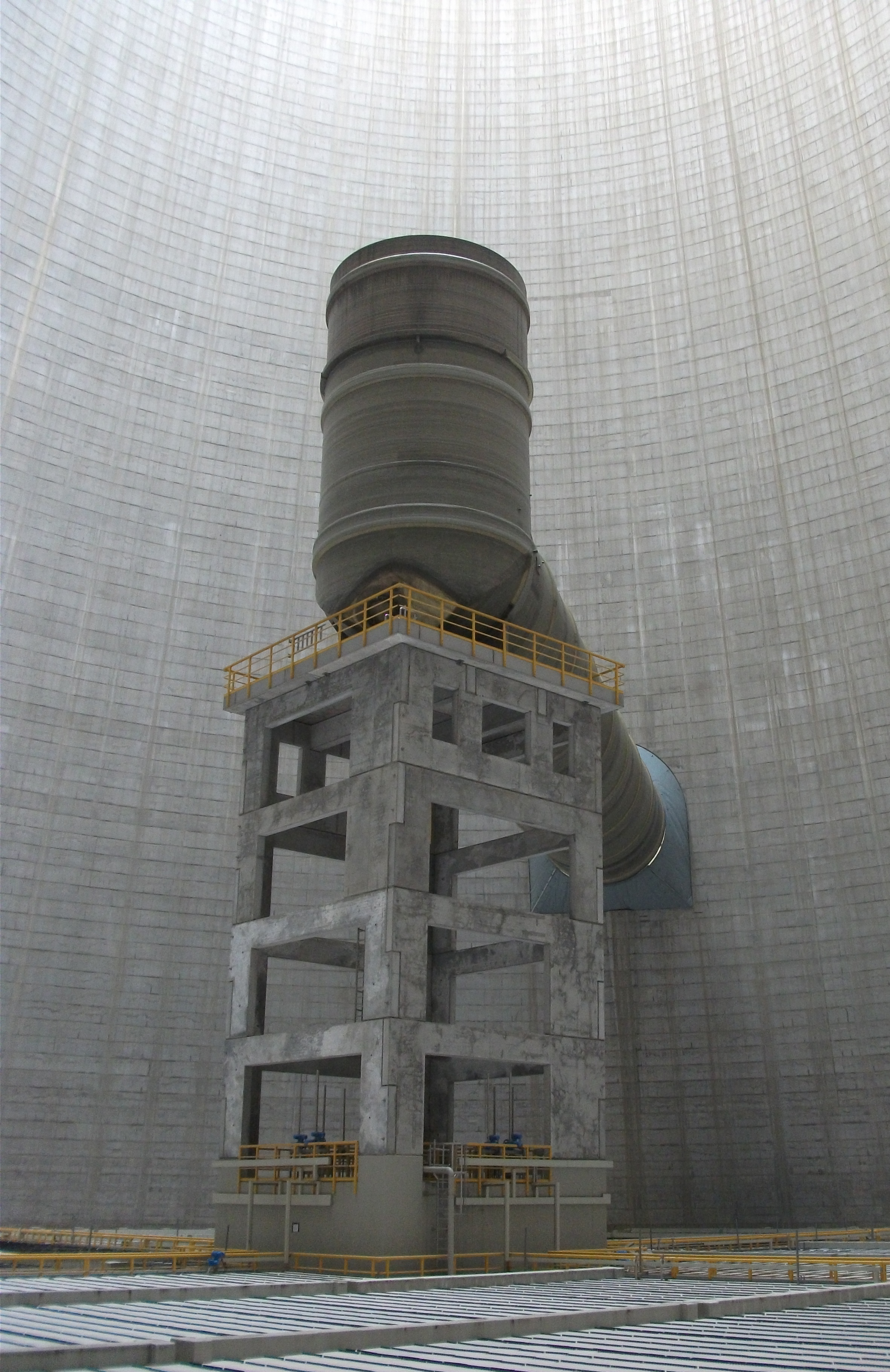
Flue-gas stack inside a natural draft wet cooling tower

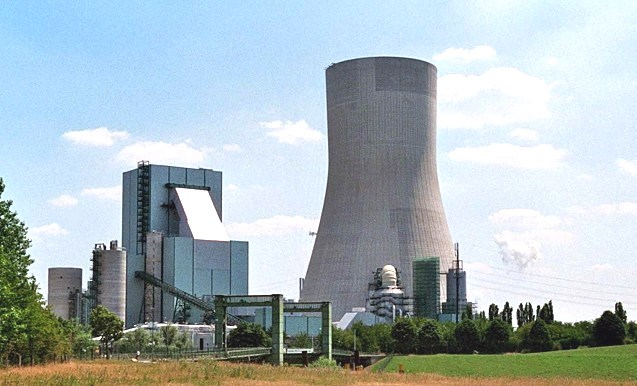
Flue gas stack connection into a natural draft wet cooling tower

At some modern power stations equipped with flue gas purification, such as the Großkrotzenburg Power Station and the Rostock Power Station, the cooling tower is also used as a flue-gas stack (industrial chimney), thus saving the cost of a separate chimney structure. At plants without flue gas purification, problems with corrosion may occur, due to reactions of raw flue gas with water to form acids.

Sometimes, natural draft cooling towers are constructed with structural steel in place of concrete (RCC) when the construction time of natural draft cooling tower is exceeding the construction time of the rest of the plant or the local soil is of poor strength to bear the heavy weight of RCC cooling towers or cement prices are higher at a site to opt for cheaper natural draft cooling towers made of structural steel.

== Operation in freezing weather ==
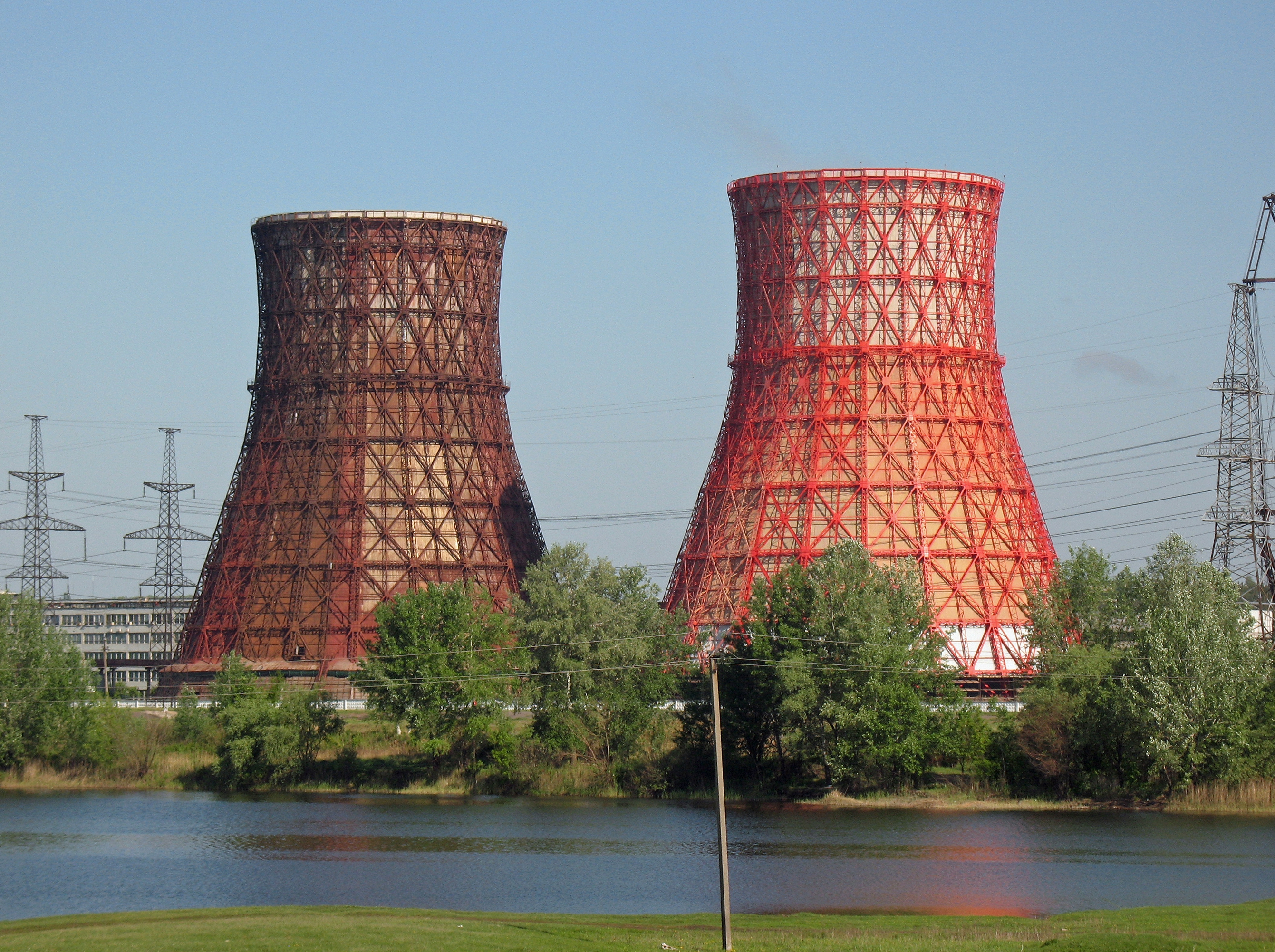
Large hyperboloid cooling towers made of structural steel for a power plant in Kharkiv (Ukraine)

Some cooling towers (such as smaller building air conditioning systems) are shut down seasonally, drained, and winterized to prevent freeze damage.

During the winter, other sites continuously operate cooling towers with 4 °C (39 °F) water leaving the tower. Basin heaters, tower draindown, and other freeze protection methods are often employed in cold climates. Operational cooling towers with malfunctions can freeze during very cold weather. Typically, freezing starts at the corners of a cooling tower with a reduced or absent heat load. Severe freezing conditions can create growing volumes of ice, resulting in increased structural loads which can cause structural damage or collapse.

To prevent freezing, the following procedures are used:

- The use of water modulating by-pass systems is not recommended during freezing weather. In such situations, the control flexibility of variable speed motors, two-speed motors, and/or two-speed motors multi-cell towers should be considered a requirement.
- Do not operate the tower unattended. Remote sensors and alarms may be installed to monitor tower conditions.
- Do not operate the tower without a heat load. Basin heaters may be used to keep the water in the tower pan at an above-freezing temperature. Heat trace ("heating tape") is a resistive heating element that is installed along water pipes to prevent freezing in cold climates.
- Maintain design water flow rate over the tower fill.
- Manipulate or reduce airflow to maintain water temperature above freezing point.

== Fire hazard ==
Cooling towers constructed in whole or in part of combustible materials can support internal fire propagation. Such fires can become very intense, due to the high surface-volume ratio of the towers, and fires can be further intensified by natural convection or fan-assisted draft. The resulting damage can be sufficiently severe to require the replacement of the entire cell or tower structure. For this reason, some codes and standards recommend that combustible cooling towers be provided with an automatic fire sprinkler system. Fires can propagate internally within the tower structure when the cell is not in operation (such as for maintenance or construction), and even while the tower is in operation, especially those of the induced-draft type, because of the existence of relatively dry areas within the towers.

== Structural stability ==
Being very large structures, cooling towers are susceptible to wind damage, and several spectacular failures have occurred in the past. At Ferrybridge power station on 1 November 1965, the station was the site of a major structural failure, when three of the cooling towers collapsed owing to vibrations in 85 mph (137 km/h) winds. Although the structures had been built to withstand higher wind speeds, the shape of the cooling towers caused westerly winds to be funneled into the towers themselves, creating a vortex. Three out of the original eight cooling towers were destroyed, and the remaining five were severely damaged. The towers were later rebuilt and all eight cooling towers were strengthened to tolerate adverse weather conditions. Building codes were changed to include improved structural support, and wind tunnel tests were introduced to check tower structures and configuration.

== See also ==
- List of tallest cooling towers
- Alkali soils
- Architectural engineering
- Deep lake water cooling
- Evaporative cooler
- Evaporative cooling
- Fossil fuel power plant
- Heating, ventilating and air conditioning
- Hyperboloid structure
- Mechanical engineering
- Nuclear power plant
- Power station
- Spray pond
- Water cooling
- Willow Island disaster
