= Staatsmijn Emma =

Coal mine in Hoensbroek, Limburg, Netherlands

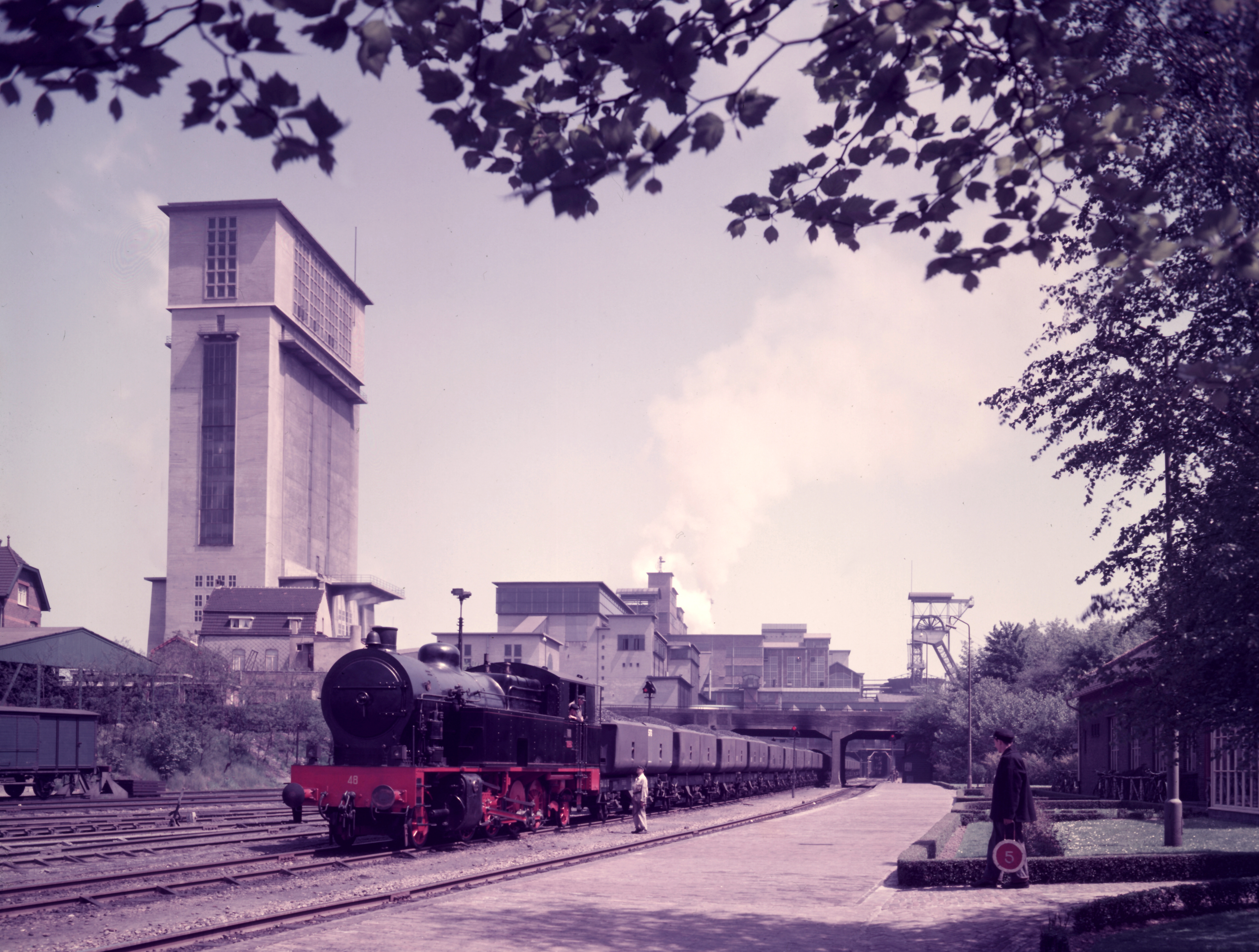
- Staatsmijn Emma seen from the west, with the 63m high tower of shaft 3 on the left, and the headframe of shaft 2 on the right

- Location within Netherlands
- Location: Hoensbroek, Limburg, Netherlands; 50°55′45″N 5°56′39″E
- Products: Coal
- Production: 109,032,000 tons
- Opened: 1911
- Closed: 1973
- Company: DSM

The Dutch State Mine (DSM) Emma, in Dutch Staatsmijn Emma, was a coal mine located in Treebeek, Heerlen (now part of Brunssum) run by the Dutch state through its company DSM. The mine was in operation from 1911 until 1973. It was the second-largest mine in the Netherlands, but it had the highest production of all Dutch mines at 109 megatonnes (120,000,000 short tons). Its deepest shaft III was 980 metres (3,220 ft) deep. After the 1963 merger with the DSM Hendrik the deepest shaft was 1,058 metres (3,471 ft) deep.

== Van Iterson cooling towers ==
DSM logo

In 1915 DSM decided to build a new cooling tower in order to cool water that was used at their coal-fired electrical power station. DSM director and engineer Frederik van Iterson made a new design of a concrete hyperboloid natural draught cooling tower, which evolved into the standard design that is used at modern power plants. The design was patented by Van Iterson and Gerard Kuypers in the Netherlands on August 16, 1916. The first Van Iterson cooling tower was built and put to use on the DSM Emma terrain in 1918. A whole series of the same and later evolved designs would follow. The towers were so iconic the Dutch State Mines decided to use them in their logo.
