= Spray pond =

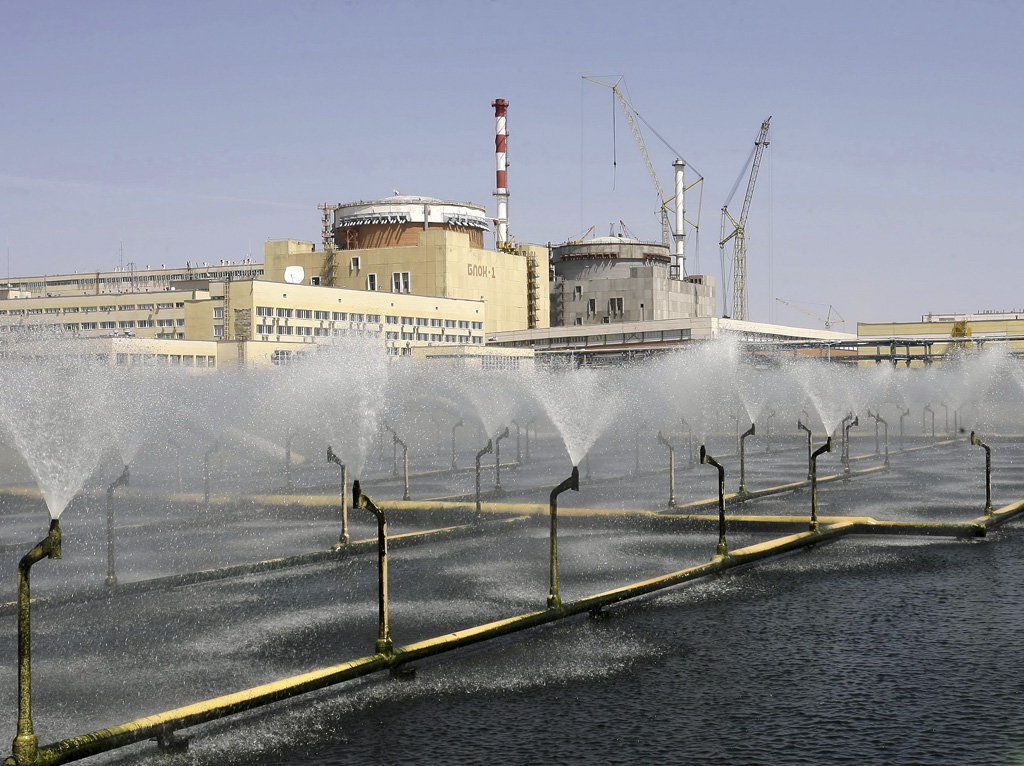
Spray ponds at Rostov Nuclear Power Plant

A spray pond is a reservoir in which warmed water (e.g. from a power plant) is cooled before reuse by spraying the warm water with nozzles into the cooler air. Cooling takes place by exchange of heat with the ambient air, involving both conductive heat transfer between the water droplets and the surrounding air and evaporative cooling (which provides by far the greatest portion, typically 85 to 90%, of the total cooling). The primary purpose of spray pond design is thus to ensure an adequate degree of contact between the hot injection water and the ambient air, so as to facilitate the process of heat transfer.

The spray pond is the predecessor to the natural draft cooling tower, which is much more efficient and takes up less space but has a much higher construction cost. A spray pond requires between 25 and 50 times the area of a cooling tower. However, some spray ponds are still in use today.

== Spray nozzles ==
The height of each spray nozzle above the surface of the pond should be between 1.5 m and 2.0 m. The spray nozzles themselves should be chosen so as to provide the desired spray pattern diameter at the pond surface, while yielding a maximum spray height of 2.5 m or more above the nozzle. This will provide an adequate contact time between the air and water and should be achievable with a delivery pressure of between 50 and 75 kPa across the nozzles. The performance of a spray pond depends to a large degree on the effectiveness of the spray nozzles which are installed. Ideally, the chosen nozzles should provide a fine, evenly distributed spray in conical form, be capable of passing small particles of suspended matter without blocking and be readily dismantled for cleaning. Typical droplet sizes which are achieved by spray pond nozzles vary between 3 mm and 6 mm. While providing better cooling performance because of their increased surface-to-volume ratios, the generation of droplets of smaller size would require an excessive pressure drop across the nozzles and could lead to increased wind-drift losses from the pond.

== Pond size ==
Specific spray pond surface areas tend to range between 1.2 and 1.7 m^{2} per m^{3}/h of water to be cooled. The width chosen for a drift channel around the active zone of the pond (containing the sprays) is dependent on a number of factors, including the prevailing wind strength, the average size of the spray droplets produced by the nozzles, and the presence of any nearby structures which may be sensitive to fogging or water drift, such as roads, houses, etc. Drift channel widths between 3 and 4 m are typically recommended.

In order to be most effective in terms of heat transfer, spray ponds should always be oriented with their longer sides at right angles to the direction of the prevailing wind. Additionally, spray ponds should be made as long and narrow as possible (i.e. with a width-to-length ratio as low as possible), so as to decrease the path length which the ambient air must travel across the pond.

The depth of a spray pond has very little influence on its thermal performance. However, the pond should contain sufficient water to fill all flumes, seal wells and pump suctions during plant startup. Typically, spray pond depths of between 0.9 m and 1.5 m are recommended in the literature, with a depth of 0.9 m being most common. Additionally, sufficient additional volume above the normal operating level should be provided within the spray pond to accept all water drainage from these flumes, seal wells and pump suctions when the plant is stopped.

Drift and evaporative losses from spray ponds of conventional design range between 3 and 5%

== Thermal performance ==
The thermal efficiency of a spray pond may be calculated based on its approach to the saturation (wet bulb) temperature of the air: (T_{H} - T_{C}) / (T_{H} - T_{W}), where the subscripts H and C refer to the temperatures of the hot and cold water streams, while the subscript W refers to the wet bulb temperature of the air. Typically, spray ponds achieve thermal efficiencies of between 50% and 70%. Further details of performance estimation may be found in the engineering literature.

== Examples ==
In the UK in the 1950s there were nine public electricity supply power stations using spray ponds. Pond throughput is in million gallons per hour (mgph). 1 mgph = 1.263 m^{3}/s.

UK electricity industry spray ponds (1950s)
Power station	Electricity output MW	Pond throughput mgph
Barugh	10	0.45
Blackburn Meadows	12	0.37
Bolton	96	4 × 0.75
Epsom	1.0	
Finchley	4.7	
Harrogate	8	0.75
Hartshead	124	0.4
Scarborough	7.0	0.35
Sutton Coldfield	1.0	0.07
