= Frederik van Iterson =

Frederik Karel Theodoor van Iterson
- Born: 12 March 1877; Roermond, Netherlands
- Died: 11 December 1957 (aged 80)
- Education: Delft University of Technology
- Engineering career
- Discipline: Mechanical engineering
- Institutions: Delft University of Technology

Frederik Karel Theodoor van Iterson (12 March 1877 – 11 December 1957) was a Dutch mechanical engineering professor, who largely developed the typical design of power station natural draught cooling tower, being built from 1918.

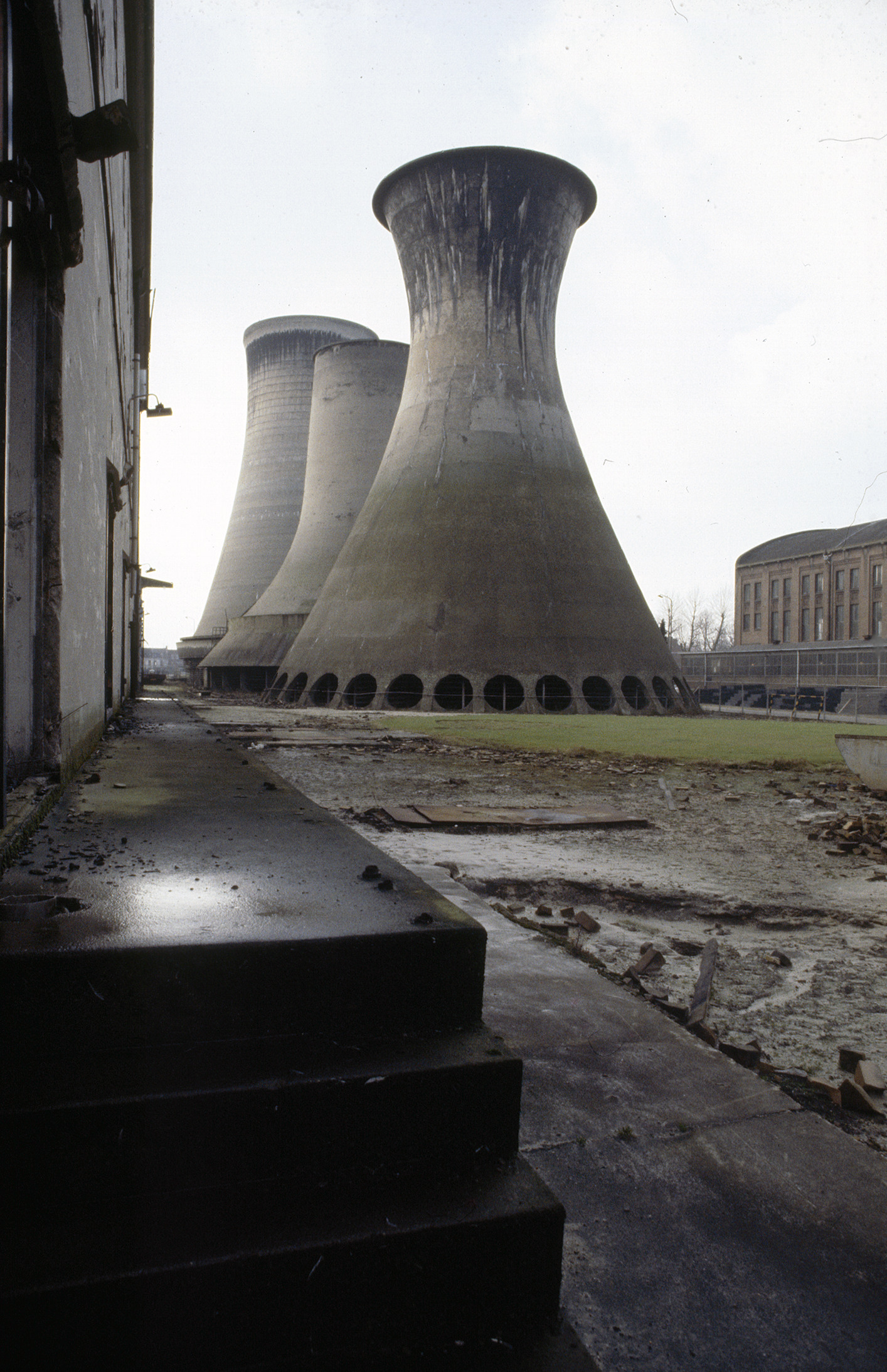
The evolution of cooling tower design was visible at the Dutch States Mine Emma, January 1st, 1984.

A hyperbolic hyperboloid design, a ruled surface developed from the hyperbolic function; the intrinsic strength in the hyperboloid design is similar to that of an eggshell in the surprisingly small wall thickness

== Early life ==
He was born in Roermond. He was the son of Gerrit van Iterson and Aghate Henrietta van Woelderen. He attended the Delft University of Technology (Technische Universiteit Delft or TU Delft). In 1899 he gained a diploma in Engineering (ingenieursdiploma).

== Career ==
In 1910 he began teaching at the technical high school in Delft. He became Director of the Dutch State Mines (DSM).

=== Cooling towers ===
He began work into the design of cooling towers. Previously, designs of cooling towers were more-or-less the same as chimneys, in octagonal planform. On 12 February 1915, the Dutch State Mines decided to build a new concrete cooling tower. This led to his work producing the hyperboloid design of cooling towers at the Staatsmijn Emma in 1918; the towers were demolished on 26 June 1985. This design of cooling towers was the world's first, and nearly all cooling towers now follow this hyperboloid design, with concrete structure. On 16 August 1916, he took out the UK patent (108,863) for Improved Construction of Cooling Towers of Reinforced Concrete; the patent was filed on 9 August 1917, and published on 11 April 1918.

The Emma coal mine, named after Emma of Waldeck and Pyrmont, was the second-largest in the Netherlands, with the Staatsmijn Maurits the largest. The Delft University of Technology still conducts much research on coal technology.

In 1931 he won an award from the Koninklijk Instituut van Ingenieurs. In 1934 he was elected member of the Royal Netherlands Academy of Arts and Sciences. In 1945 he helped to establish Tebodin Consultants & Engineers, bought by Hollandse Beton Groep (HBS) in 2002, and now owned by Bilfinger of Germany since 2012.

== Personal life ==
He married Jennie Woutera Rotgans on 24 December 1910. They had two daughters and a son. He lived at Heerlen.

== See also ==
- List of hyperboloid structures
- Vladimir Shukhov, a Russian engineer also known for hyperboloid structures
