= Air-cooled heat exchanger =

Type of heat exchanger that uses ambient air as the cooling medium

An air-cooled heat exchanger (ACHE) is a finned-tube heat exchanger that uses ambient air as the cooling medium. It consists of tubes that conduct heat with optional fins to increase its surface, and a fan to provide an airflow that cools these tubes. Usually axial fans are used to move air through the heat exchanger as air cooled heat exchangers are mostly installed outside of facilities if possible. While air is the medium to which the heat gets dissipated, air cooled heat exchangers usually work using coolants inside the tubes for convection of the heat from the heat source to the heat exchanger.
