= Cave temples in Asia =

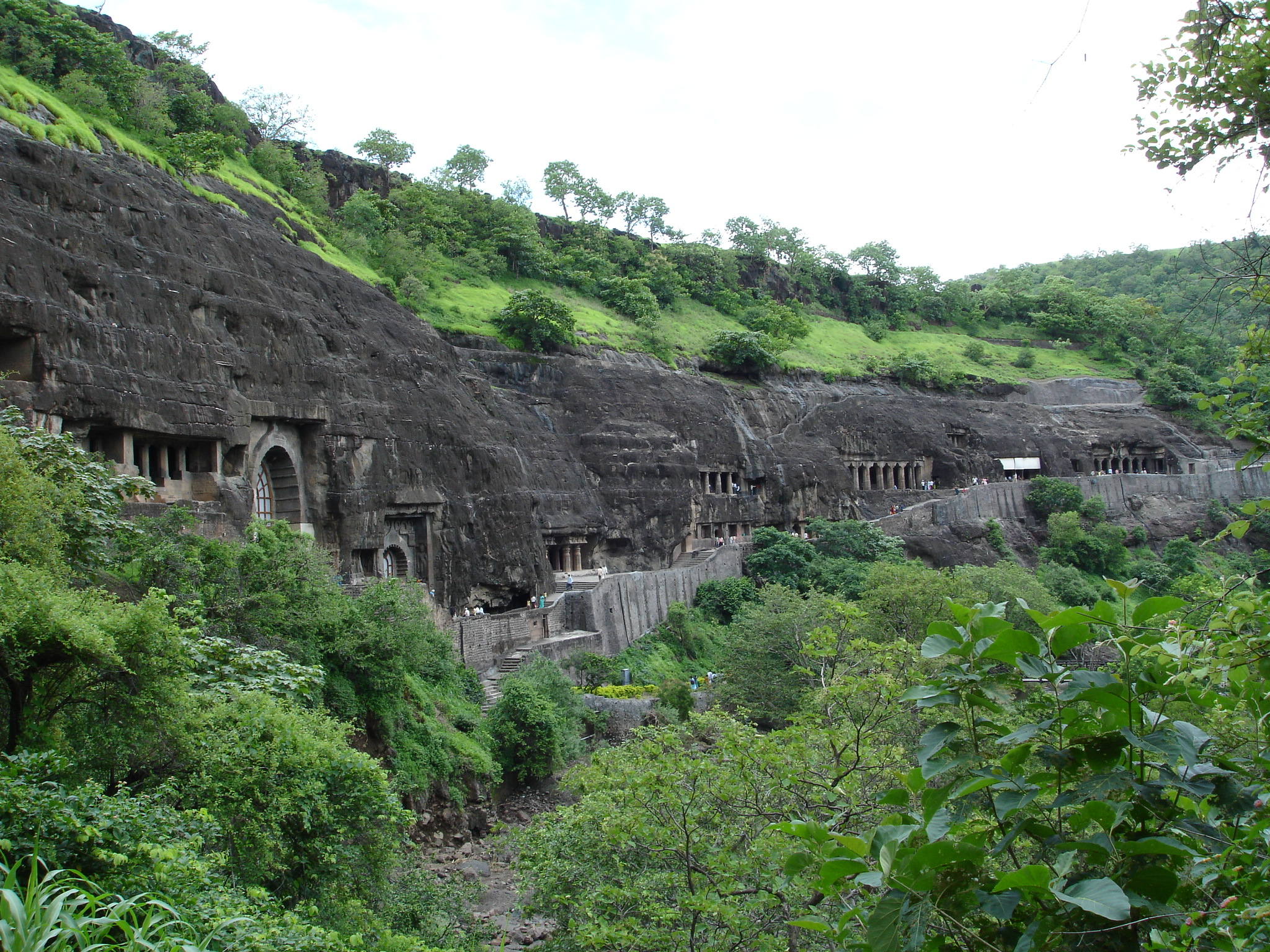
Ajanta in Maharashtra, India

Cave temples are subterranean sacred buildings carved into the rock or created in a natural cave. Cave temples and monolithic rock temples carved out of the stone are a form of early natural architecture and rock construction, a building technique in solid rock closely related to sculpture. The most extensive artificially created cave temple complexes (subterranea) originated in India, where about 1200 complexes are documented, and in the neighboring regions of Asia.

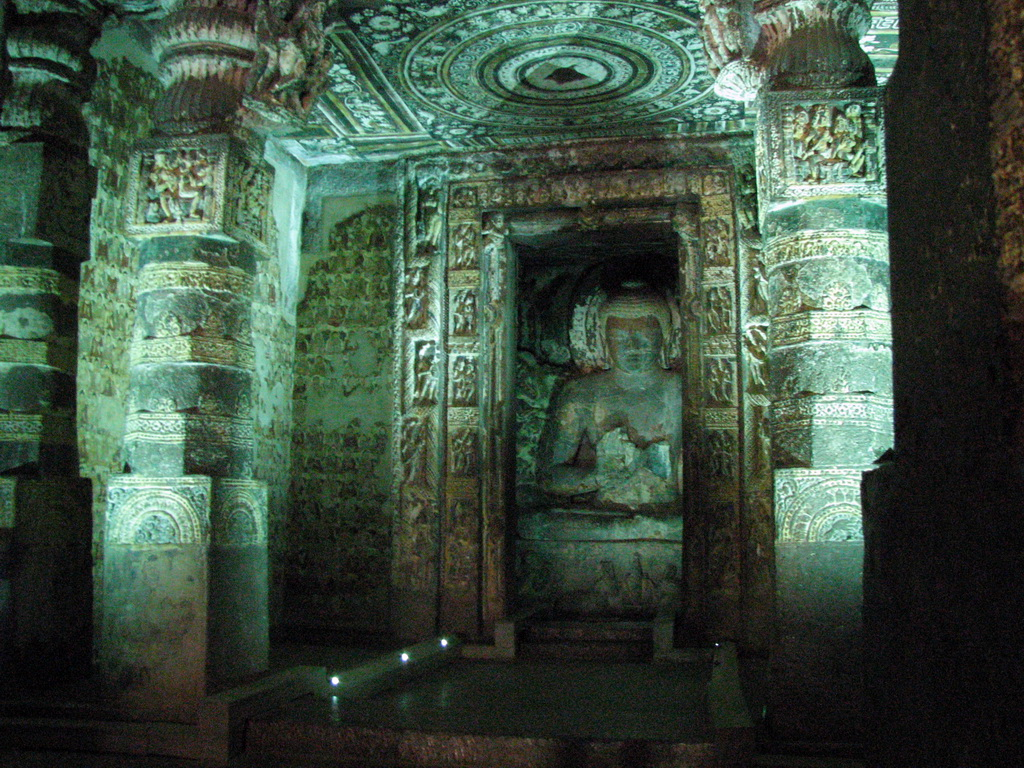
Chapel with Buddha statue in Ajanta (Cave 1)

The basic form of cave temples in Asia was developed from the second century BCE in western India from the prefiguration of the mountain hermitage of the world-weary Śramaṇa Movement (Sanskrit, m., श्रमण, śramaṇa, Pali, m., samaṇa, mendicant monk), a detached hut or cave used as a dwelling for ascetics. Central design principles are probably derived from the model of wooden open-air buildings that no longer exist today.

Along long-distance trade routes, cave temples spread from South Asia to Central and East Asia. In Southeast Asia, natural caves were predominantly used as underground sanctuaries instead of artificial caves. The UNESCO World Heritage List includes numerous cave temples in Asia, including Ajanta, Elephanta, Ellora and Mamallapuram in India, the Mogao, Longmen and Yungang Grottoes in China, Dambulla in Sri Lanka and Seokguram in South Korea.

In addition to the Asian lines of development, cave temples and other, sometimes significantly older, rock structures also appear in other ancient cultures, such as Egypt, Assyria, the Hittites, Lycia, and the Nabataeans.

== Precursors and rock architecture worldwide ==
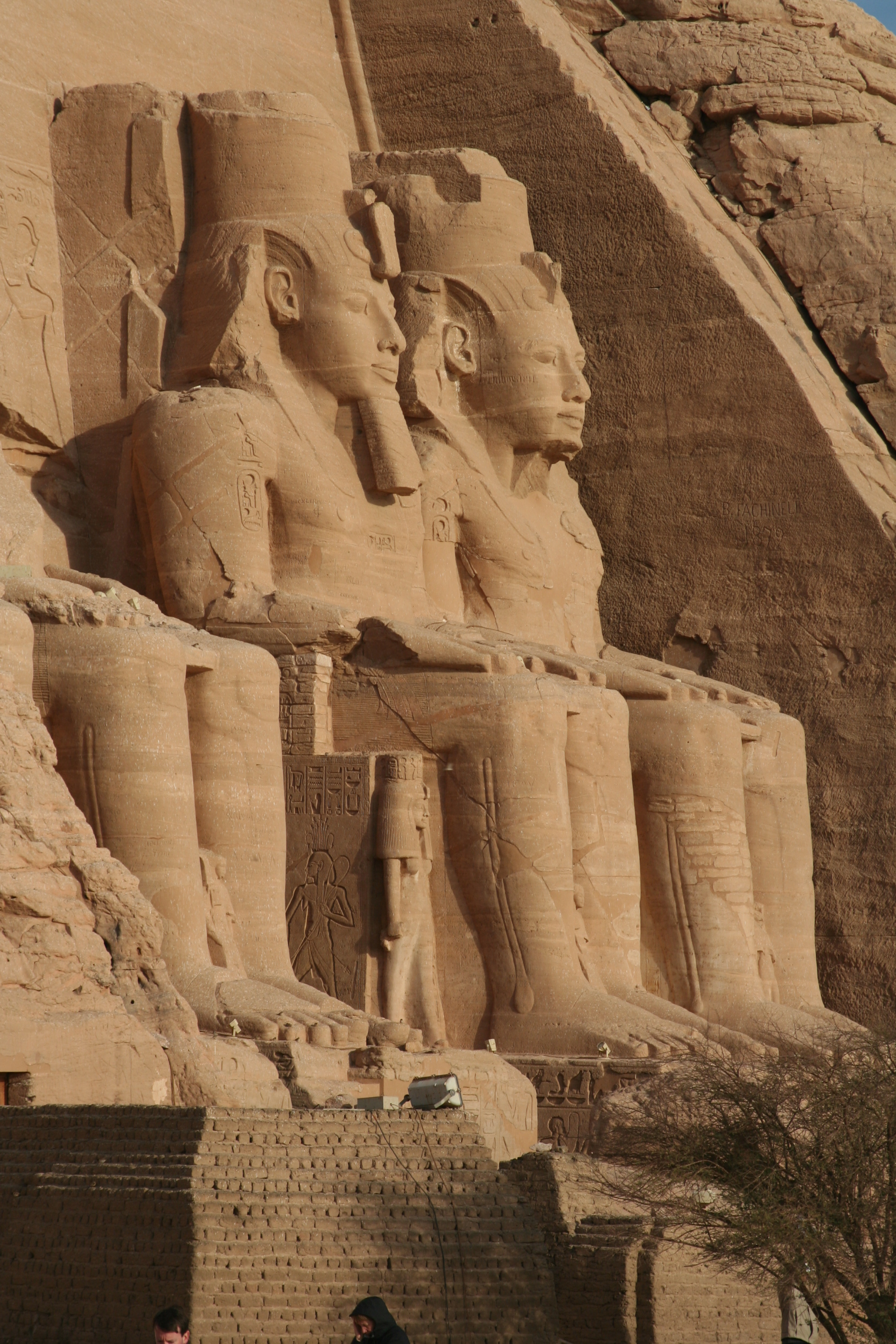
Great Temple of Ramses II (detail), Abu Simbel, Egypt

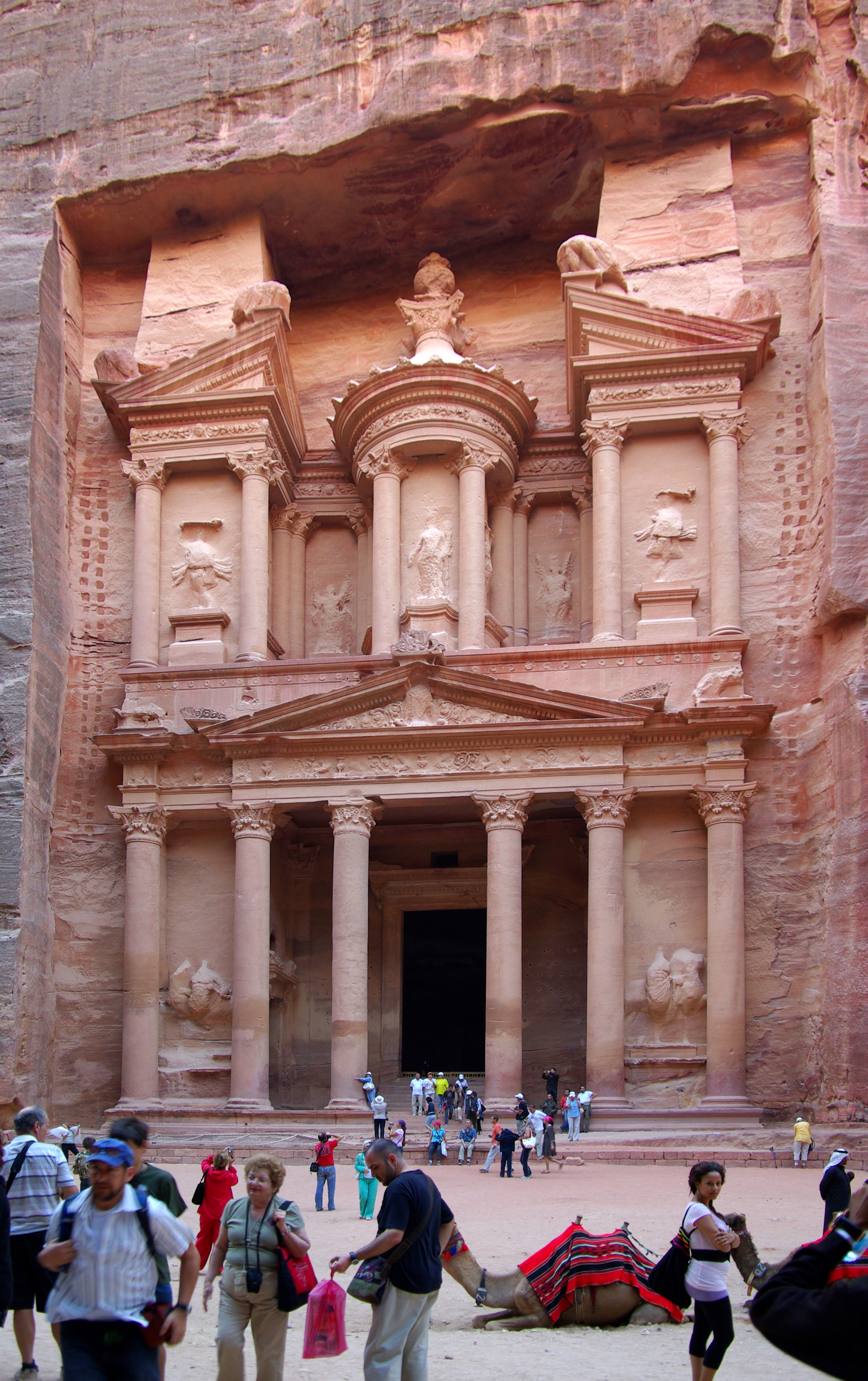
The so-called "Pharaoh's treasure house" in Petra, Jordan

Already in prehistoric times, caves served people as places of refuge, burial or worship. The marking of the cave transformed it from a fascinating place to a sacred site. During the Upper Paleolithic and Mesolithic, cultic use included ritual dedication, permanent marking (for example, in the form of cave paintings), and regularly repeated rites. Prehistoric rock art is found at about 700,000 sites in 120 countries and is recorded with more than 20 million figural representations.

Since the time of the early advanced civilizations, artificial rock structures appeared as a new construction method in North Africa, Asia Minor, the Near East, Central Asia, South Asia and East Asia. They served as dwellings, shelters and depots (Cappadocia in present-day Turkey), as burial caves (Petra in Jordan) or as temples and monasteries (India). Rock structures of the pre-Columbian advanced civilizations of the Americas are also occasionally referred to as cave temples, for example Kenko with a puma altar near Cusco or the Cuauhcalli temple near Malinalco in State of Mexico (16th century).

Among the most striking complexes in the world are the monumental rock temples of the Egyptian pharaonic empire, the temples of Abu Simbel (also known here as Speos). The Great Temple of Ramesses II at Abu Simbel on the western bank of the Nile was built as early as 1280 B.C. The temple complex, which includes a sanctuary and various chambers, was cut completely into the rock massif.

Other rock-cut structures are preserved mainly in Asia Minor and the Near East. Hittite sanctuaries were carved from rock in the 15th-13th centuries BCE at Yazılıkaya in what is now the Turkish province of Çorum. In the 5th century BC, the Lycians built hundreds of rock-cut tombs in southern Anatolia (for example, at Dalyan, Muğla Province, Turkey). The Nabataeans also carved temples and tombs into the rock at Petra (Jordan) between 100 B.C. and A.D. 150. Christian cave settlements with extensive dugout and rock churches were created at Göreme in Turkish Cappadocia (from the 4th century), at Matera in southern Italy (early medieval), and at Lalibela in northern Ethiopia in the 12th-13th centuries.

== Buddhist cave temples in India ==
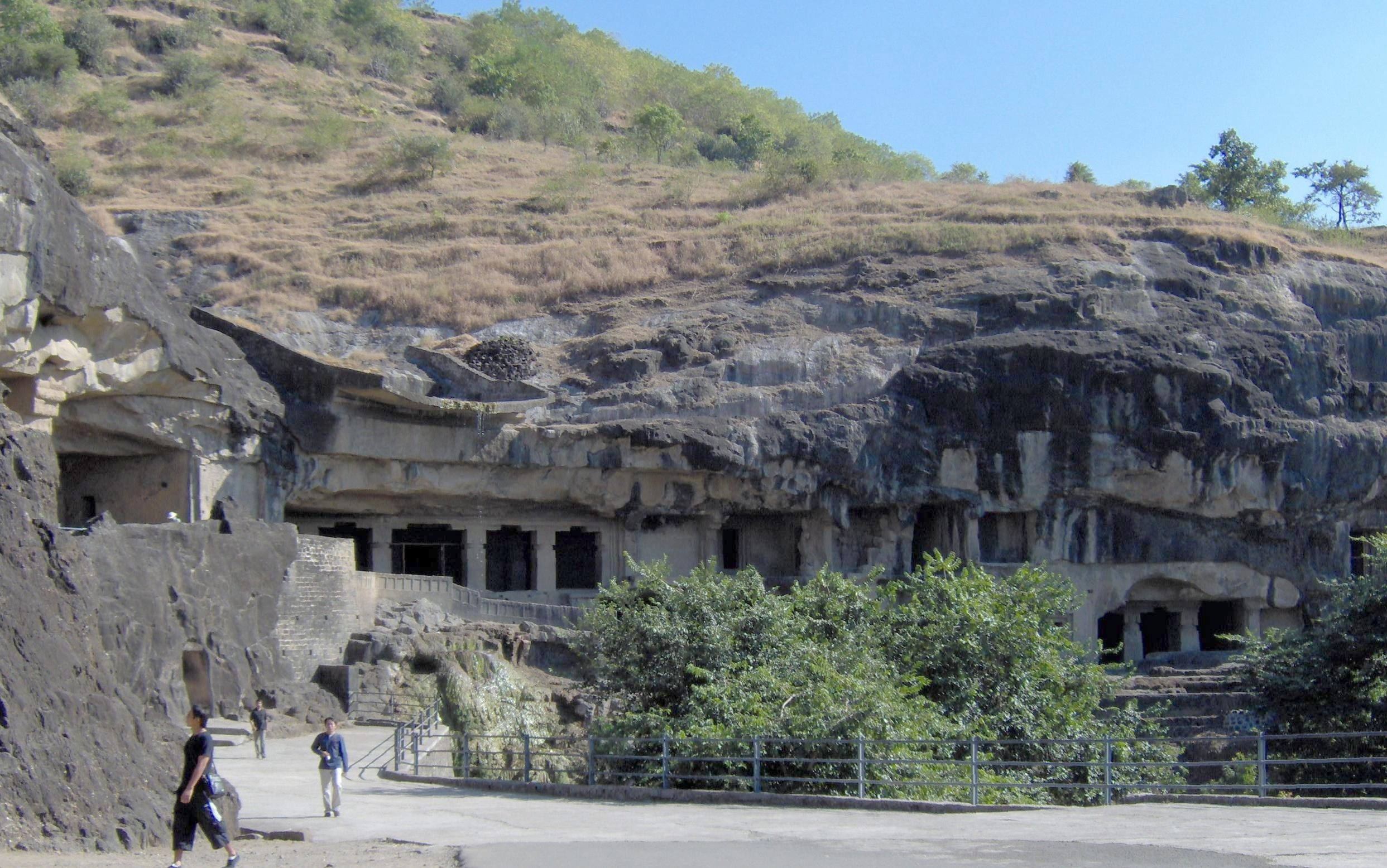
The Buddhist Caves of Ellora, India

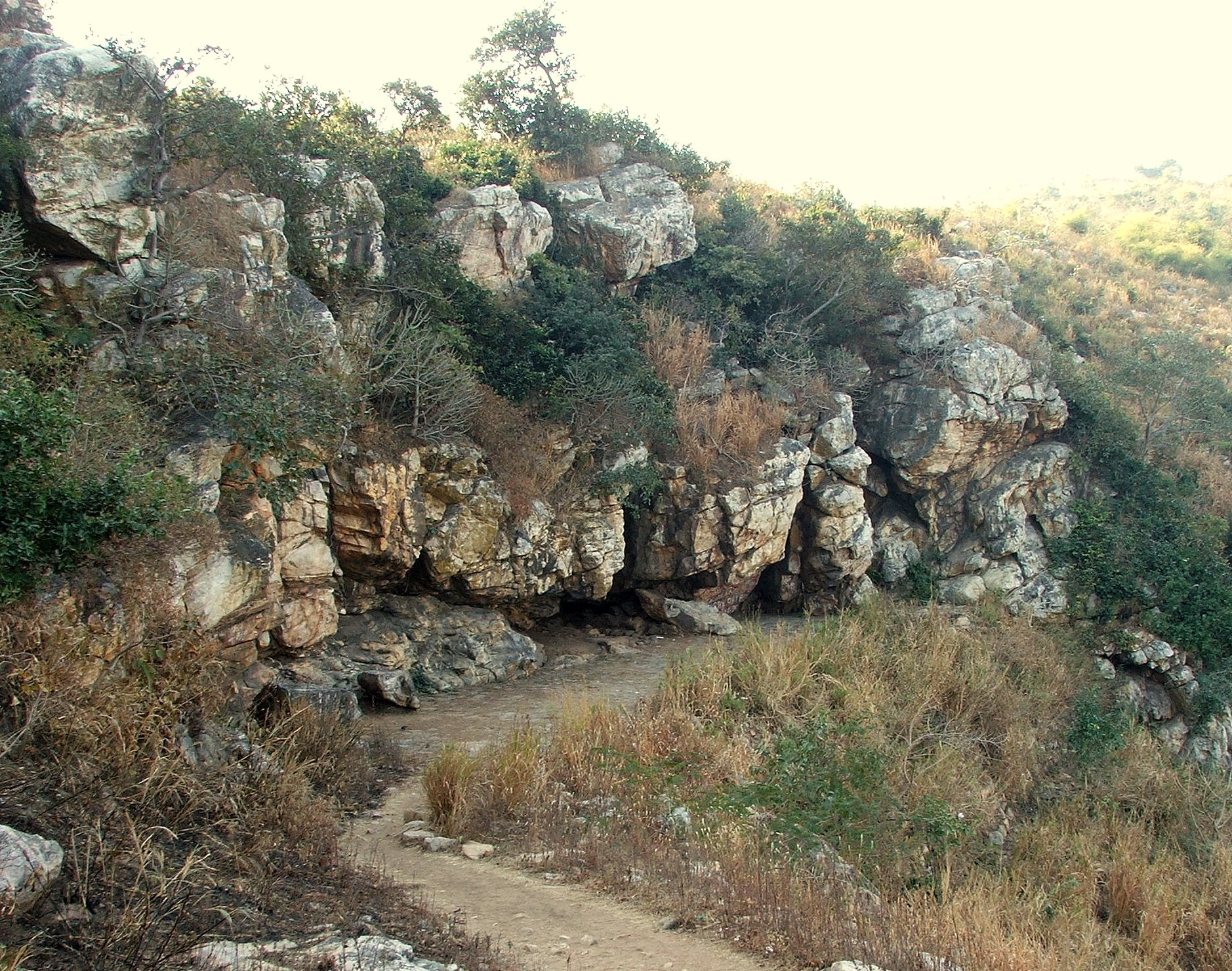
Sattapanni Cave in Rajagriha, Bihar, India, Site of the First Buddhist Council

=== Caves in early Buddhism ===
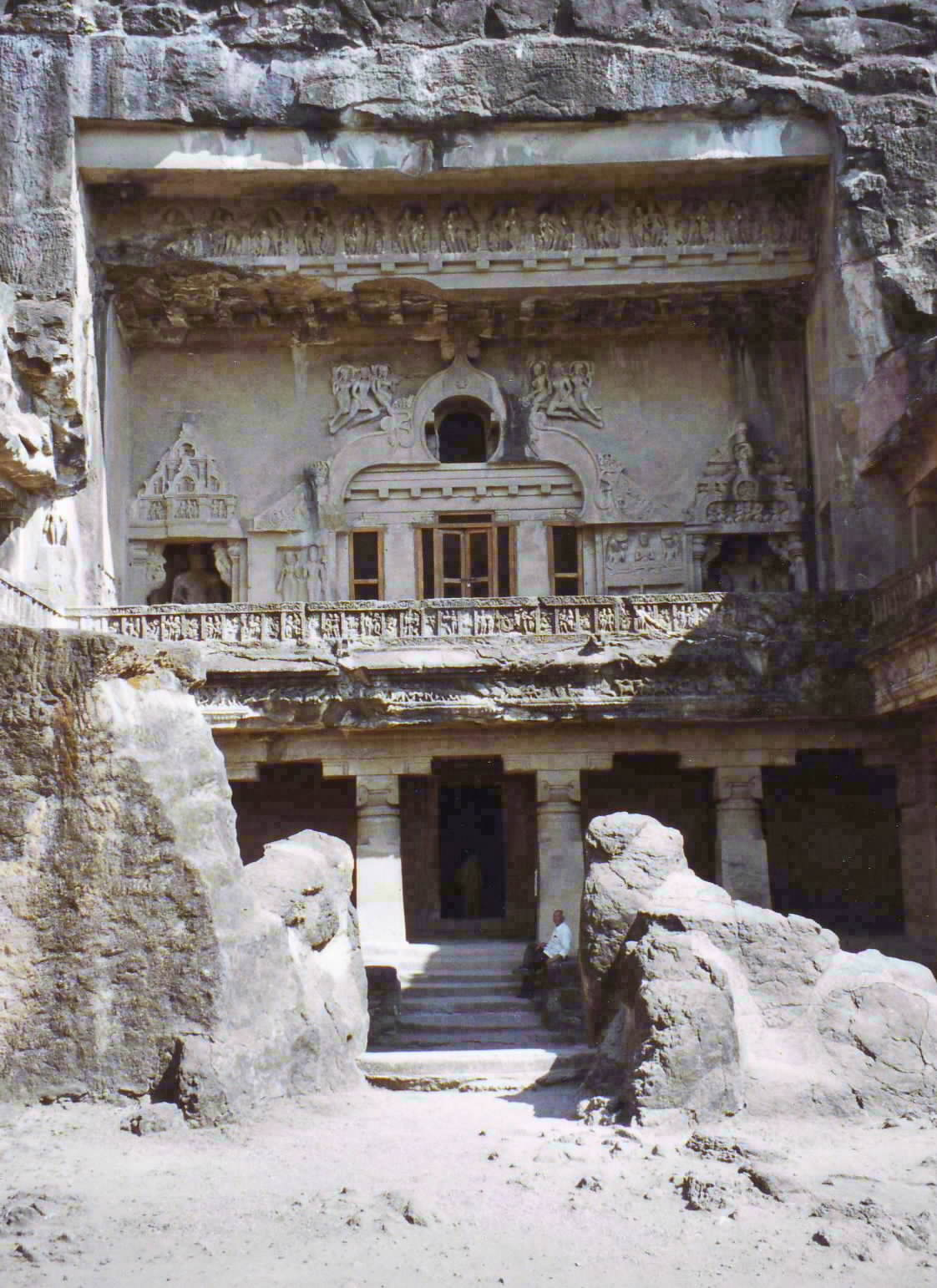
Only Chaitya hall of Ellora (Cave 10) with portico, balcony and horseshoe-shaped window

Buddhist cave temples represent an underground variant of the Buddhist monastery and temple complex, which dates back to the dwelling of the ascetic Śramana Movement since the epoch of the Upanishads (8th to 7th century BC) as well as to urbuddhist meditation sites. The historical Siddhartha Gautama, even as a young wandering ascetic before attaining enlightenment, retreated to caves for meditation (according to tradition, for example, to the Dungeshwari Cave near Bodh Gaya in Bihar). As Buddha, he occasionally used a cave near Rajagriha as a meditation site, as recorded in the Pali Canon, an early record of Buddha's doctrinal discourses from the 1st century BC (DN, ch. 16.3, chs. 21 and 25). This cave was identified by the Chinese pilgrim monk Faxian in the 5th century A.D. as Pippala Cave on Mount Vebhara (Vulture Mountain).

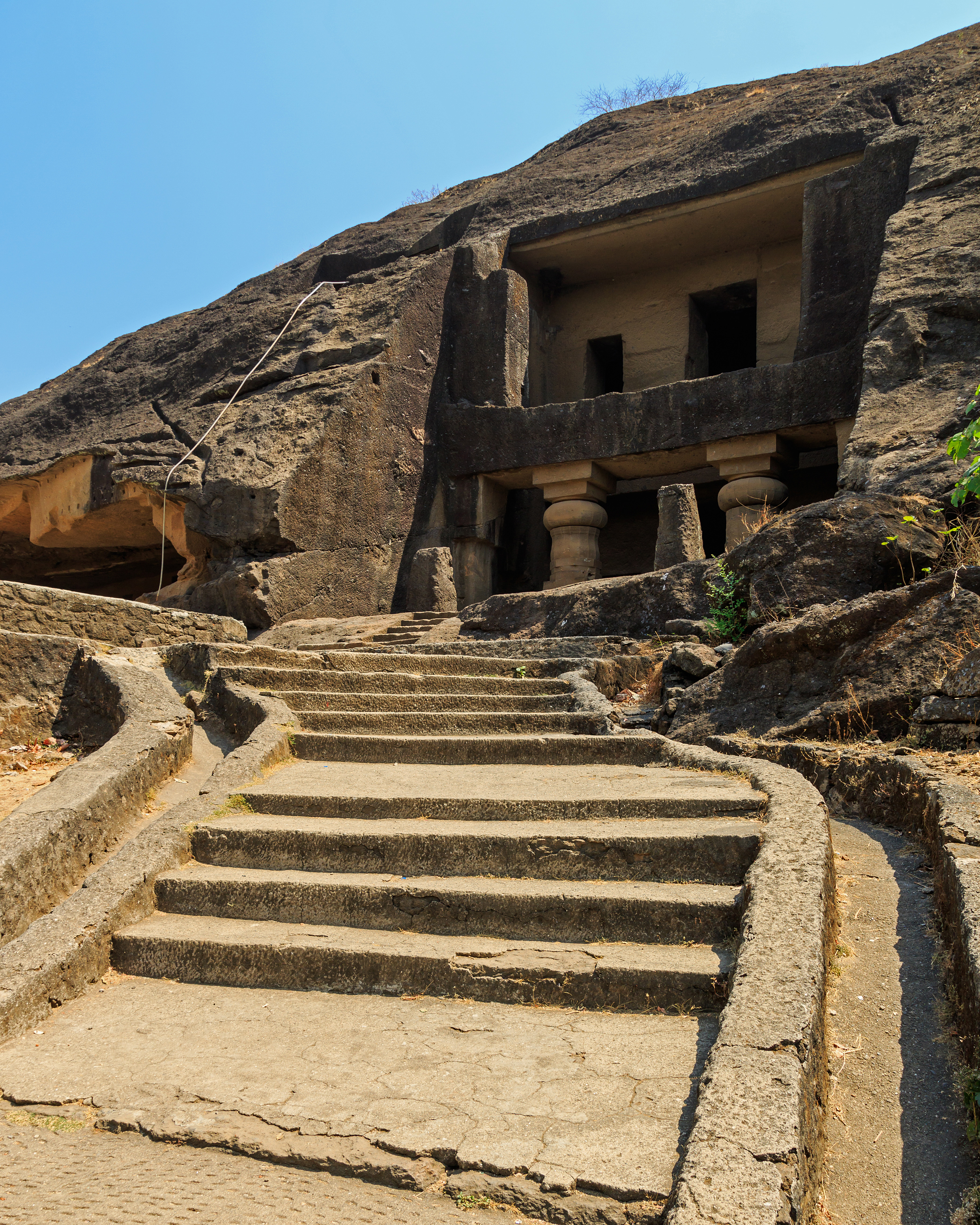
Kanheri near Mumbai, temple complex with 109 caves

The Pali Canon cites natural caves (Pali, kandara) as common retreats for members of the Buddhist order (MN, chs. 27, 38, 39 and more), who could meditate there largely shielded from sensory stimuli. The First Buddhist council, held at Rajagriha shortly after the Buddha's death in the 5th century B.C., is also said by Buddhist tradition to have taken place in a hall outside the Sattapanni cave on the northern slope of Mount Vebhara. Given the principle of "houselessness" of the Buddhist order, the natural protective function of caves contributed to the development of Buddhist cave temples. Cave temples provided better protection against the elements than the homemade freestanding rain huts made of bamboo and mats that served as refuges during the rainy monsoon season and were torn down at the end of the monsoon.

=== The era of Emperor Ashoka ===
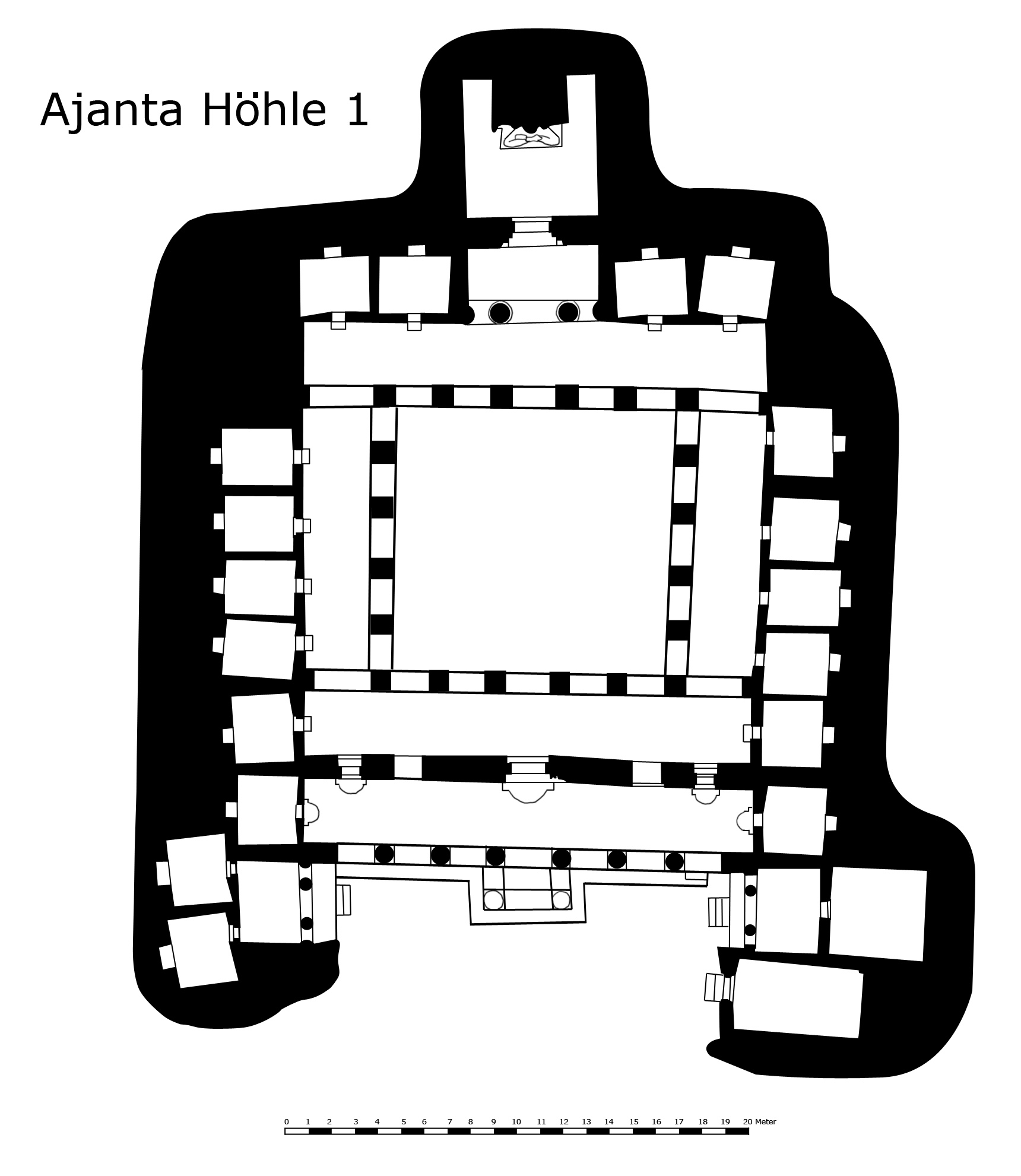
Ajanta (Cave 1), Vihara or (Rock) monastery with antechamber, main hall and cult chapel, about 40 meters long

The actual construction of artificial cave temples made of "grown" rock was not initiated until the era of Maurya emperor Ashoka, who in the 3rd century B.C. donated corresponding, initially still quite elementary facilities for the ascetic community of the Ajivika (for example, the Lomas Rishi cave near Barabar). The Buddhists further developed these preliminary forms into elaborate centers of monastic life with increasingly rich relief decoration. With the support of wealthy Buddhist laymen, they created the basic form of Indian rock architecture during the centuries before and after the birth of Christ, which spread widely along the trade routes during the following millennium. A connection between the older Egyptian, Hittite or Lycian rock architecture of the West and the younger, considerably more numerous Indian rock buildings has not yet been clearly demonstrated.

=== Context of origin ===
The emergence of Indian cave temple complexes, after restrained beginnings in the 3rd and 2nd centuries BC, took off considerably with the growing prosperity of the artisan classes of western India. A major reason for this was the increased trade with the Roman Empire since the first century AD. Especially on the Indian artisans (Skt., m., शूद्र, shudra), who formed the lower castes within the impermeable Brahmanical society, Buddhism exercised considerable attraction due to its appreciation also of lay confessors as fully valid aspirants to salvation, due to the de facto devaluation of caste membership (Skt., वर्ण, varnas) and the rejection of costly Vedic sacrificial rituals.

In contrast to Hinduism, Buddhism with its monastic communities relied primarily on urban culture. Influential urban merchant guilds donated the money for the construction and endowment of entire monasteries, as endowment inscriptions attest. For their part, the monasteries financed the local merchants through loans. In addition, the endowment of temples in Hinduism and Buddhism counts among the spiritually meritorious acts (Skt., puṇya). The competition between different craft guilds for the decoration of their foundations led to a considerable upsurge in Indian rock art, sculpture and painting, especially during the period of the Gupta dynasty, which ruled over northern and central India from 320 to 650 AD, whose works survived the test of time in the cave temples, many of which were later abandoned.

The cave monasteries, which were given to the religious on permanent loan, were supplied by the lay Buddhist followers of the surrounding villages and settlements, who offered food, medicine and clothing to the begging monks. The daily routine in the Buddhist monasteries was strictly structured. After waking before sunrise, the monks rose with a song or the recitation of an edifying verse, cleaned the monastery, and procured the necessary drinking water. The daily routine also included offering flowers in common assembly, a round of begging to acquire food, a meal, meditation exercises, the study of texts, and attendance at doctrinal presentations.

=== Building structure and technology ===
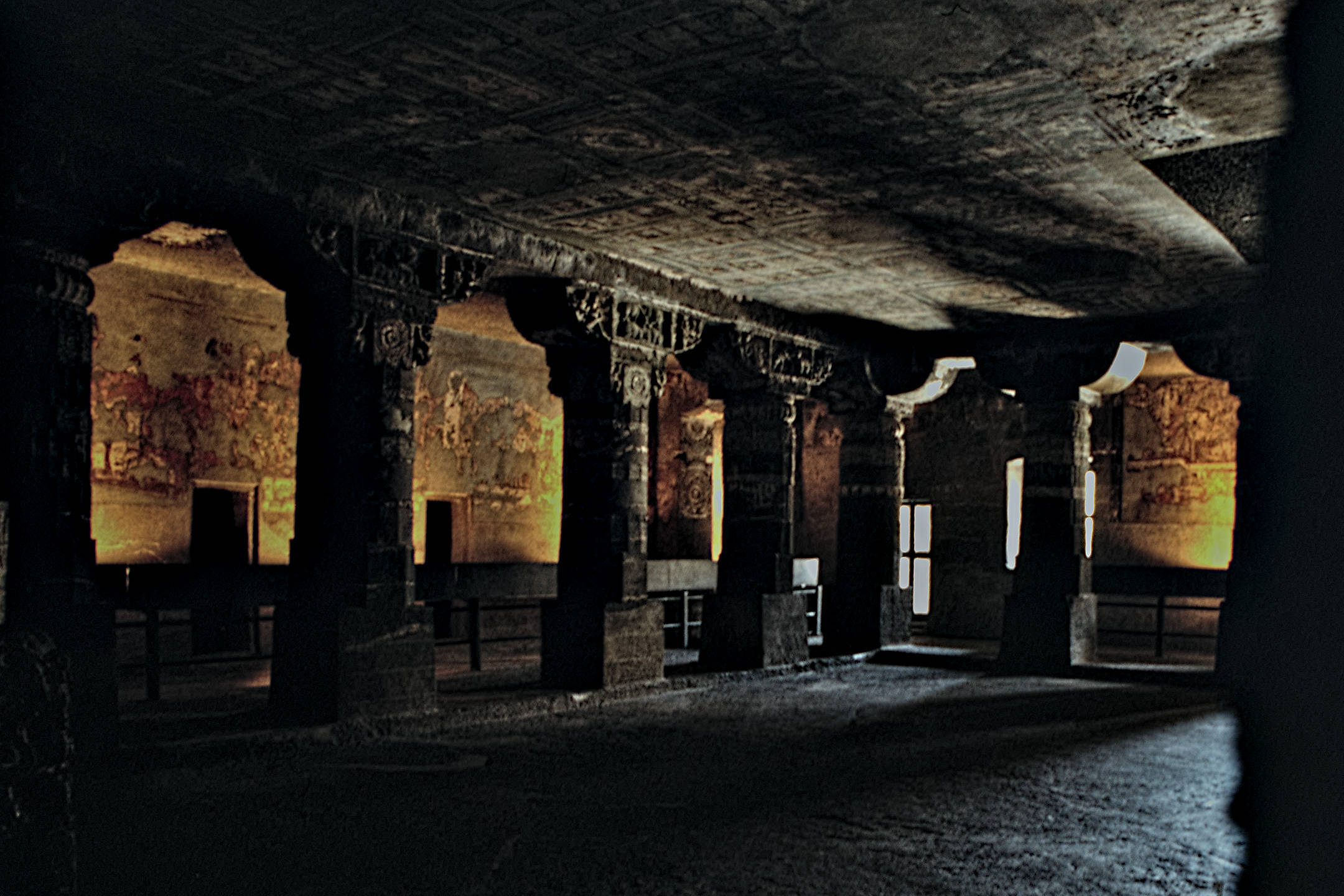
Ajanta (Cave 1), Vihara, India

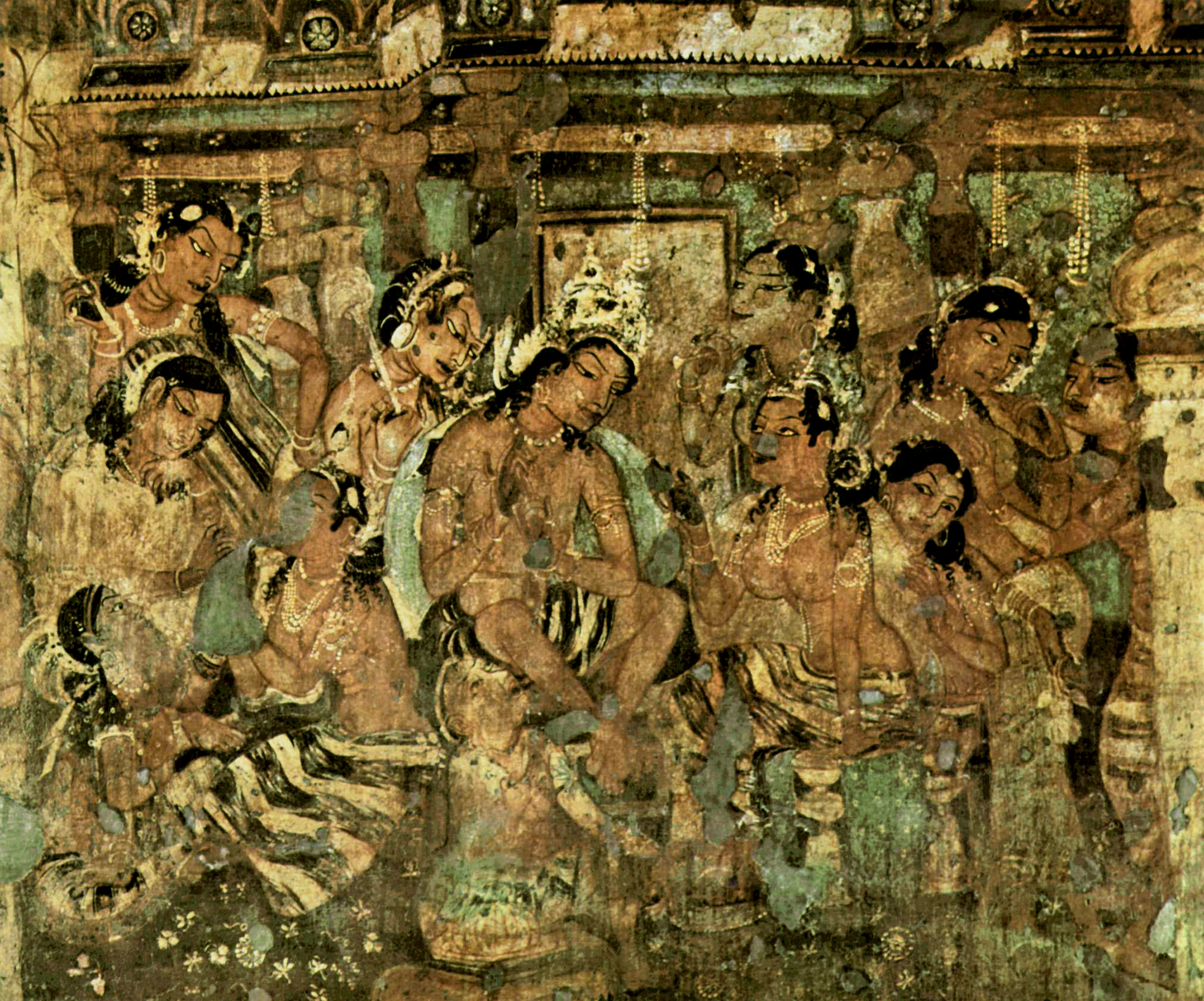
Gupta-period mural painting in Ajanta (Cave 1) on the Mahâjanaka-Jātaka: a raja declares the renunciation of the world

Strictly speaking, early Buddhist rock architecture is not temples in a traditional sense of facilities "that appear comparable in terms of their structural form (monumentality, stone construction) or their religious function (dwelling place of a god or goddess)." Early Buddhism does not recognize sanctuaries and structures dedicated to a divine power. Despite the primary function of Buddhist rock buildings as monastic complexes, the generic designation cave temple has become equally accepted for Buddhist and Hindu underground sacred buildings. In the case of Buddhist rock buildings, it ties in with the temple-like structure of the chaitya hall and its orientation toward a blessed sacrament.

The Buddhist cave monasteries and cave temples of South, Central, and East Asia are characterized by two central building types: Buildings housing or enclosing Buddhist sacred objects, and buildings of monastic life.

- The first type of construction includes the three-nave basilica-like prayer hall (Chaitya Hall), which serves the meritorious transformation of the bell-shaped central shrine (stupa).
- The second type of construction includes the meditation and residential halls of the Buddhist monks (vihara) and their ancillary facilities.

Common structural elements in the exterior of Buddhist temple and monastery caves include porticoes (porches), side chapels, columned porches, atria, and open stairways.

The Chaitya or Prayer Hall (from Skt., caitya-gṛha; Pali, cetiya, sanctuary) stands in the center of the Buddhist temple complex. The three-nave Chaitya Hall is separated by two rows of columns into a central nave, whose ceiling is a barrel vault with a wooden or stone ribbed ceiling, and two side naves. The hall serves to house a usually richly decorated reliquary casket (Skt., स्तूप, stūpa; Pali, thupa, mound, originally in the sense of burial mound) surrounded by a walkway for ritual circumambulation. An elaborate wooden facade with one or more gates was originally set in front of the Chaitya hall. In conjunction with a horseshoe-shaped window above the hall's entrance gate, the wooden facade caused the stupa niche in the semicircular apse at the end of the hall to be enveloped in atmospheric lighting effects.

In the vicinity of the Chaitya Hall are the monastery rooms. The monks' living quarters (Skt./Pali, n., विहार, vihāra, abode, residence) include a number of narrow living cells (Skt., bhikṣu-gṛha) for two persons each, in addition to common rooms. The monk cells are arranged around a courtyard or central pillared hall (skt., मण्डप, maṇḍapa). Other elements of monastic construction include cisterns, magazines, and other ancillary rooms for practical purposes. The cave monasteries of Mahayana Buddhism, the second main school of Buddhism, which were built between the 5th and 8th centuries CE, contain richly decorated rows of columns as well as cult image chapels or smaller hemispherical stupas. They are decorated with large-scale murals depicting the life and pre-existences of the historical Buddha. In many cases, the layers of paint that decorated the temple complex over large areas were later removed by weathering.

In terms of construction, the rock face was first worked vertically across the width of the planned cave. Then the facade was marked and chiselling into the rock from above began. The excavation work proceeded in stages. The top step always reached deepest into the rock. When the back wall was reached, the ceiling was completed, making scaffolding unnecessary. While the stonemasons worked their way down through the rock, cutting out planned columns and sculptures, the facades were completed at the same time. The only tools available to the stonemasons were a pickaxe, hammer and chisel.

=== Development into a monumental building ===
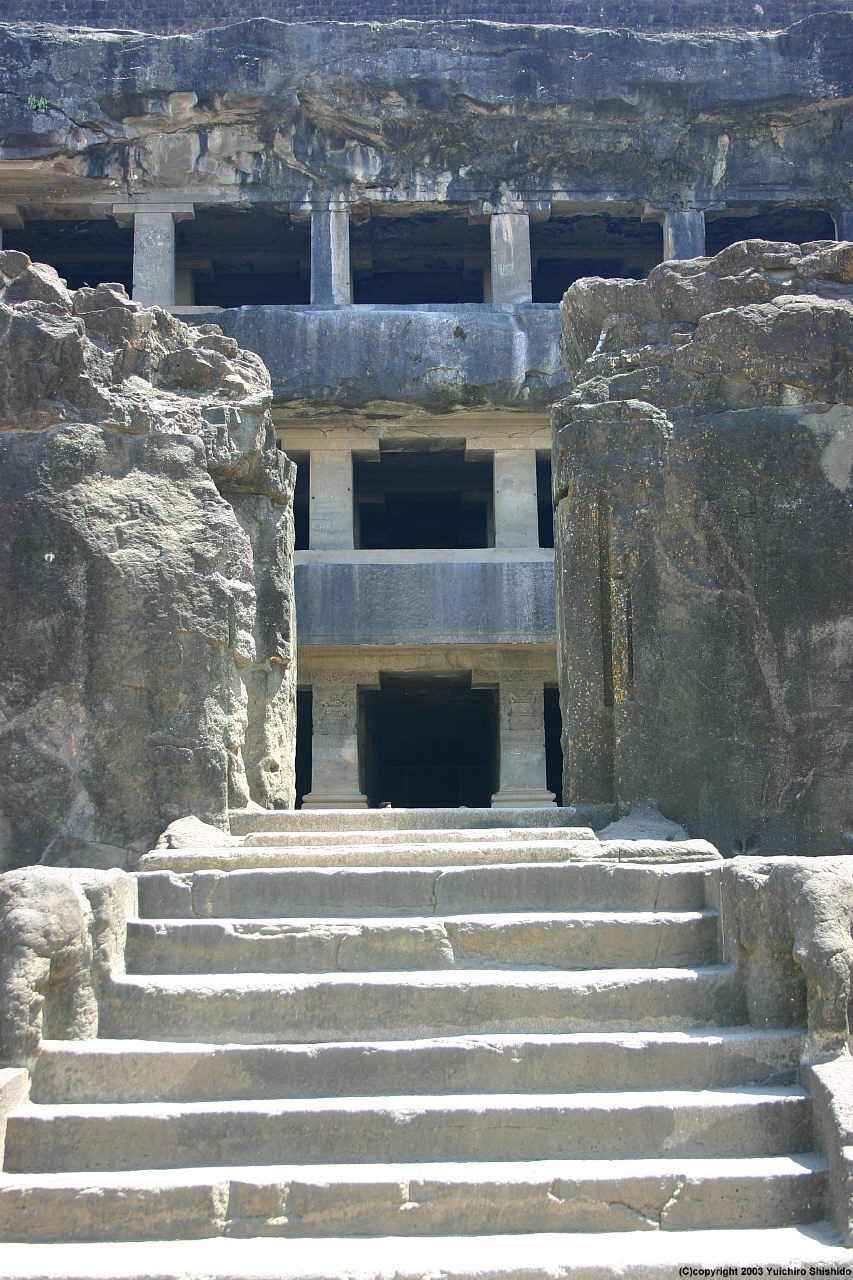
Three-story monastic school Tin Thal in Ellora (Cave 12)

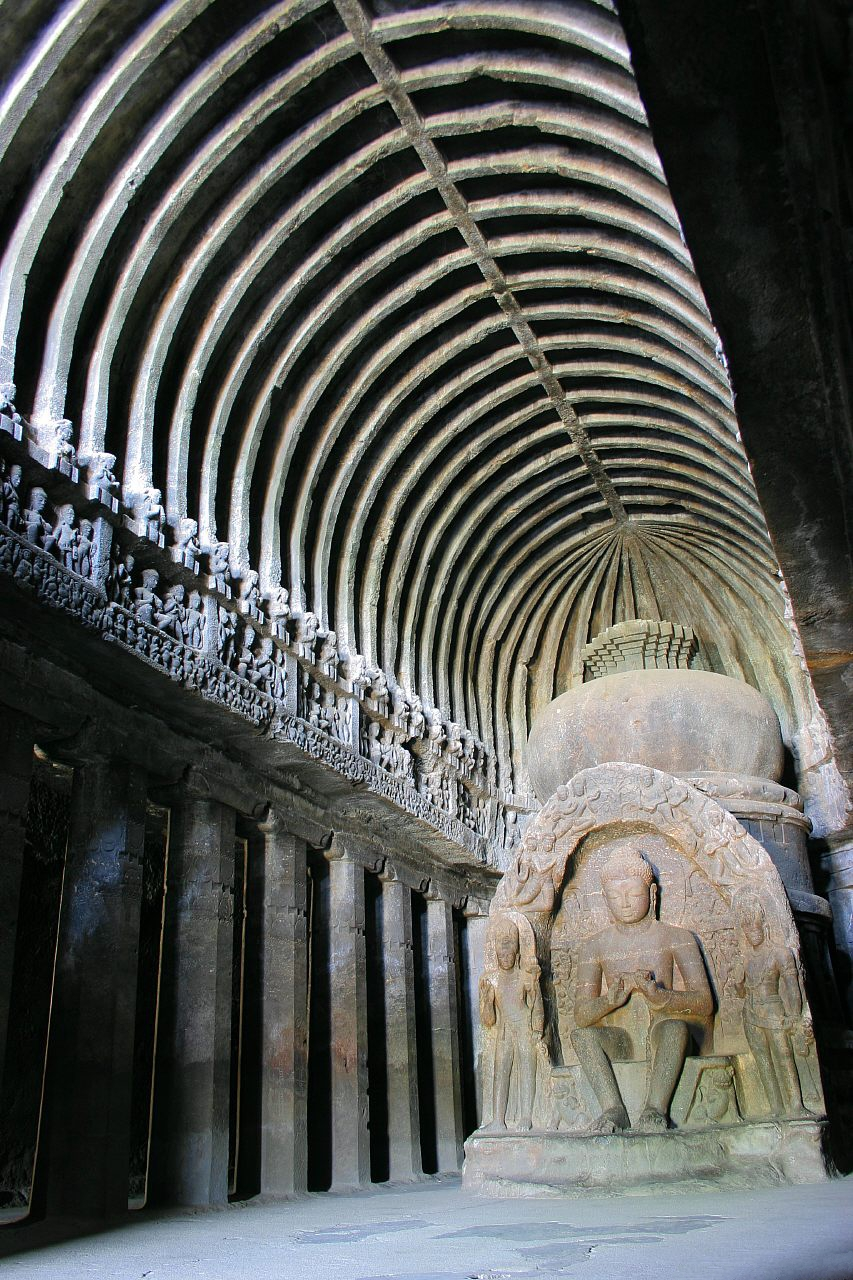
Temple hall (Ellora, Cave 10) with bell-shaped stupa in the apse

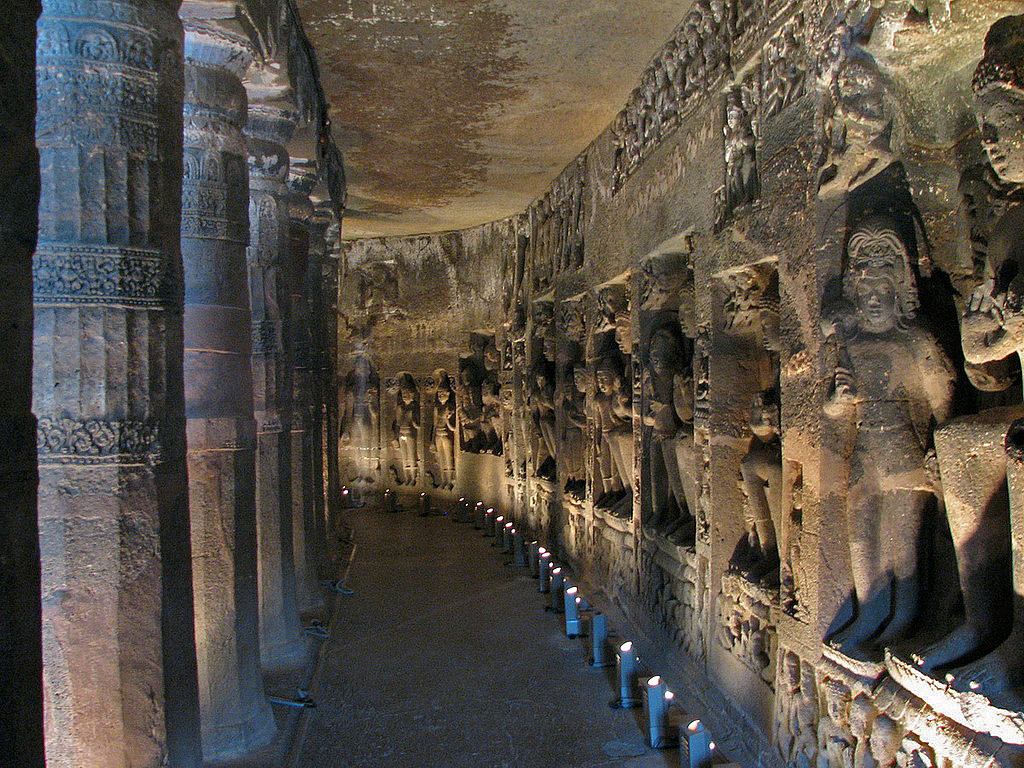
Side corridor of a Chaitya hall in Ajanta

In view of the increasing strength of the Vedic-Brahman religion, the development of the cave temples led to the expansion of the Buddhist cave temple into a monastic school. Already in Ajanta (caves 6 and 27), a multi-story cave had been carved out of the stone - probably in imitation of non-preserved wooden monastic free buildings. Besides the Chaitya hall and the vihara, a large chapter house (Dharmashala, Skt., dharma, teaching [Buddha's]; shala, place of teaching) occurs, for example, in Ellora (three-story cave 12, Tin Thal, and cave 11, Do Thal), Bagh (No. 5), Dhamnar (No. 11), and Kholvi (No. 10).

While the Chaitya and temple halls were primarily used for ceremonies such as the Pradakshina (Skt.), that is, the ritual transformation of the stupa with the intention of acquiring spiritual merit, and the monastic rooms of the viharas were primarily used for meditation and living, the Dharmashala, with long rows of stone benches, is laid out as a large Buddhist teaching and preaching hall. On one level of the Ellora monastic school, up to 30 listeners seated in rows between the pillars could follow the interpretations of a Buddhist teacher.

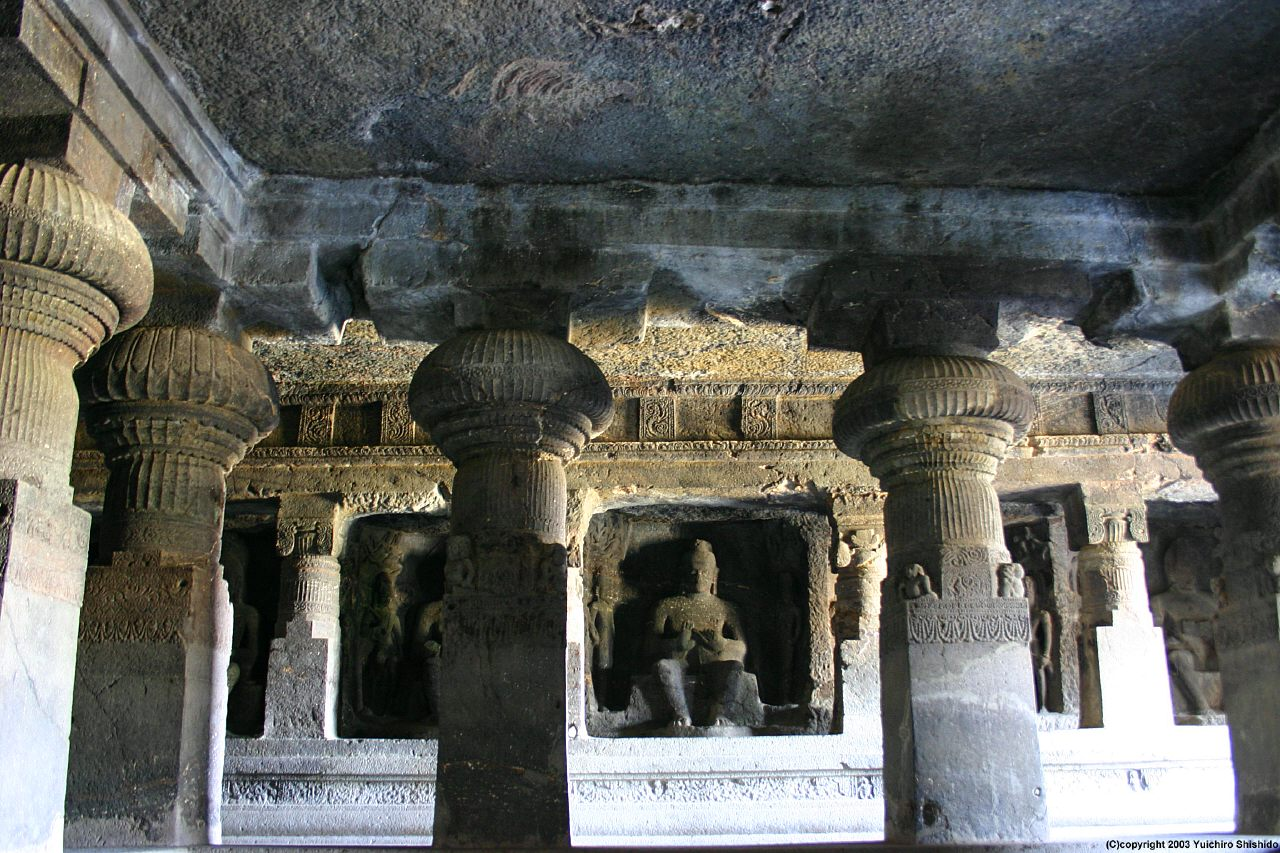
Monastery with cult chapel in Ellora (Cave 3)

=== Distribution in India ===
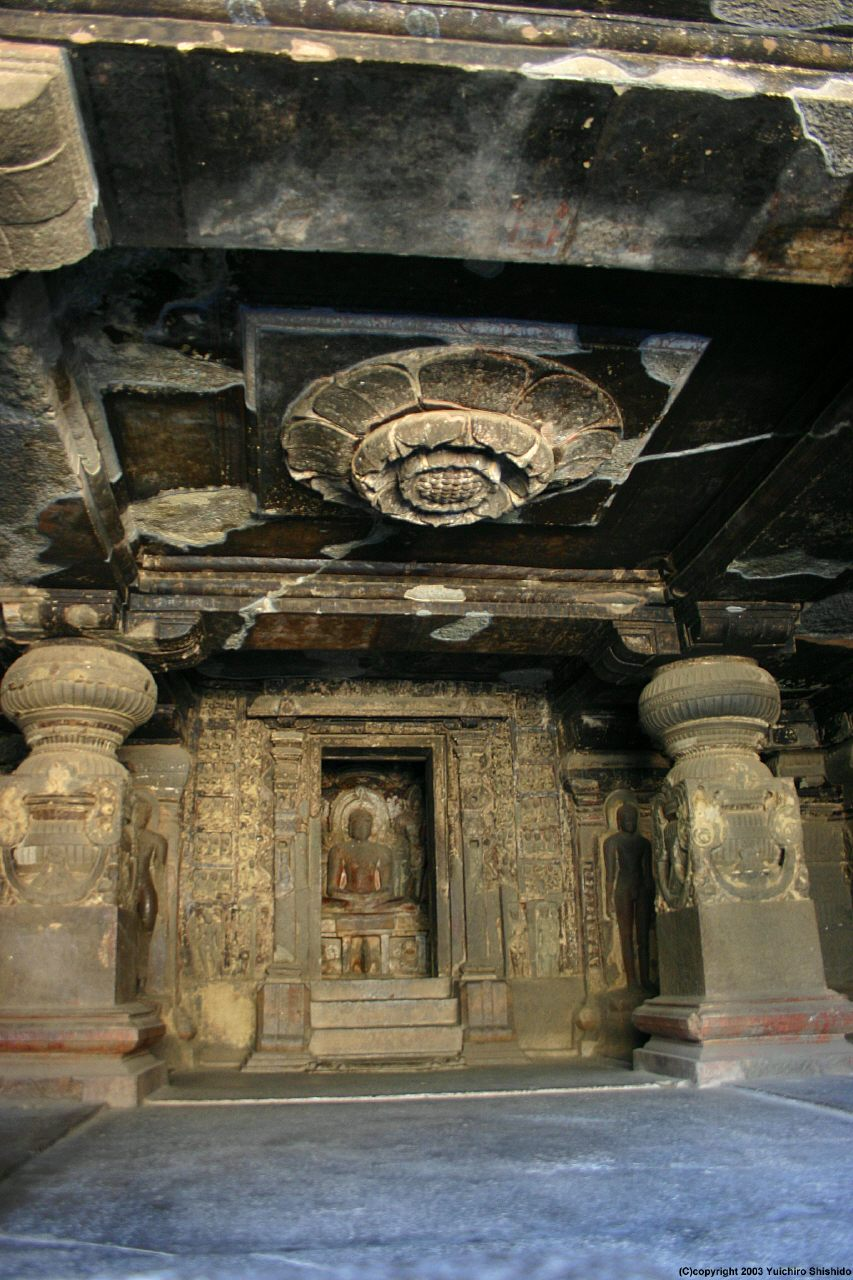
Monastery with cult chapel in Ellora (Cave 32)

To date, approximately 1,200 Buddhist, Hindu, and Jain temple caves are known in India, of which about 1,000 are located in the state of Maharashtra, others in Andhra Pradesh, southeast of Maharashtra, and in the northwestern states of Gujarat, Rajasthan, and Madhya Pradesh. The oldest known cave temples originated in the context of the Shramana movement around the 3rd century BCE in the later northeastern state of Bihar (eight caves at Barabar, Nagarjuni, and Sita Marhi near Rajagriha, now Rajgir).

Several archaeologically and touristically intensively developed cave and rock temple complexes of different religious character are included in the UNESCO World Heritage List:

- Ajanta (Buddhist, 2nd century BC-7th century AD, 29 caves), located in the extensive Wagora River Valley and accidentally rediscovered by a British cavalry officer in 1819,
- Ellora (Buddhist, Shivaite-Hindu, Jain, c. 6th-12th century CE, 34 caves), carved out of a basaltic cliff face over 2 kilometers in length,
- Elephanta on Gharapuri Island near Mumbai (Hindu, 9th-13th century, dating disputed, four caves), all in the Indian state of Maharashtra,
- The temple district of Mamallapuram on the Coromandel Coast near Chennai, Tamil Nadu (Hindu, 7th-9th century CE, 17 monolithic rock temples), whose beacons served as navigational aids for Pallava dynasty sailors.

More Buddhist cave temples of India:

Federal State	City	Cave temple	Date of origin	Notes
Andhra Pradesh	Kamavarapukota	Guntupalli	2nd century BC	
	Vijayawada	Undavalli	4th/5th century AD.	
Bihar	Jehanabad	Barabar Caves	2nd century BC	
	Rajgir	Son Bhandar Caves	2nd c.	2 small Jain Caves
Gujarat	Junagadh	Uparkot, Khapra Kodiya and Baba Pyare Caves	1st-4th c.	
	Talaja	Talaja Caves	1st-4th c.	
Madhya Pradesh	Chandwasa	Dhamnar	4th-6th c.	almost 50 caves, a Hindu monolith temple
	Dhar	Bagh	5th-7th c.	9 caves, formerly extensive wall painting
Maharashtra	Aurangabad	Aurangabad Caves	6th/7th c.	10 caves in two groups
	Bhomarwadi	Pitalkhora Caves	2nd-1st century BC.	
	Junnar region	Lenyadri, Manmodi, Shivneri and Tulja Caves	1st-3rd c.	over 200 caves in total
	Konkan region	Kuda, Karhad, Mahad, Sudhagarh and others		
	Lonavla	Bhaja and Karla Caves	2nd century B.C. to 5th century A.D.	Bhaja: 18 caves
	Maval (Kamshet)	Bedsa Caves	1st century BC	
	Mumbai	Jogeshwari, Kanheri, Mahakali, Mandapeshwar Caves	1st c. BC to 2nd c. / to 9th c.	over 100 caves
	Mumbai (Salsette)	Mahakali Caves (also: Kondivita Caves)		about 20 caves in basalt rock
	Nashik	Pandu Lena (Pandavleni)	1st/2nd c.	33 caves
	Raigad (district)	Kondana Caves	1st century BC	
Rajasthan	Jhalawar	Kolvi and Binnayaga Monastery	5th c.	

== Hindu cave temples in India ==
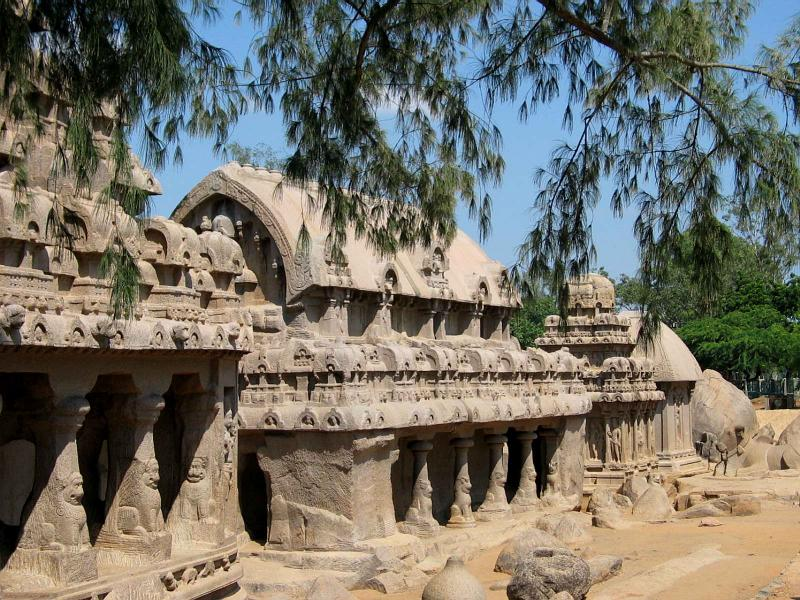
The Five Rathas ("Processional Chariots") in Mamallapuram, Tamil Nadu, India

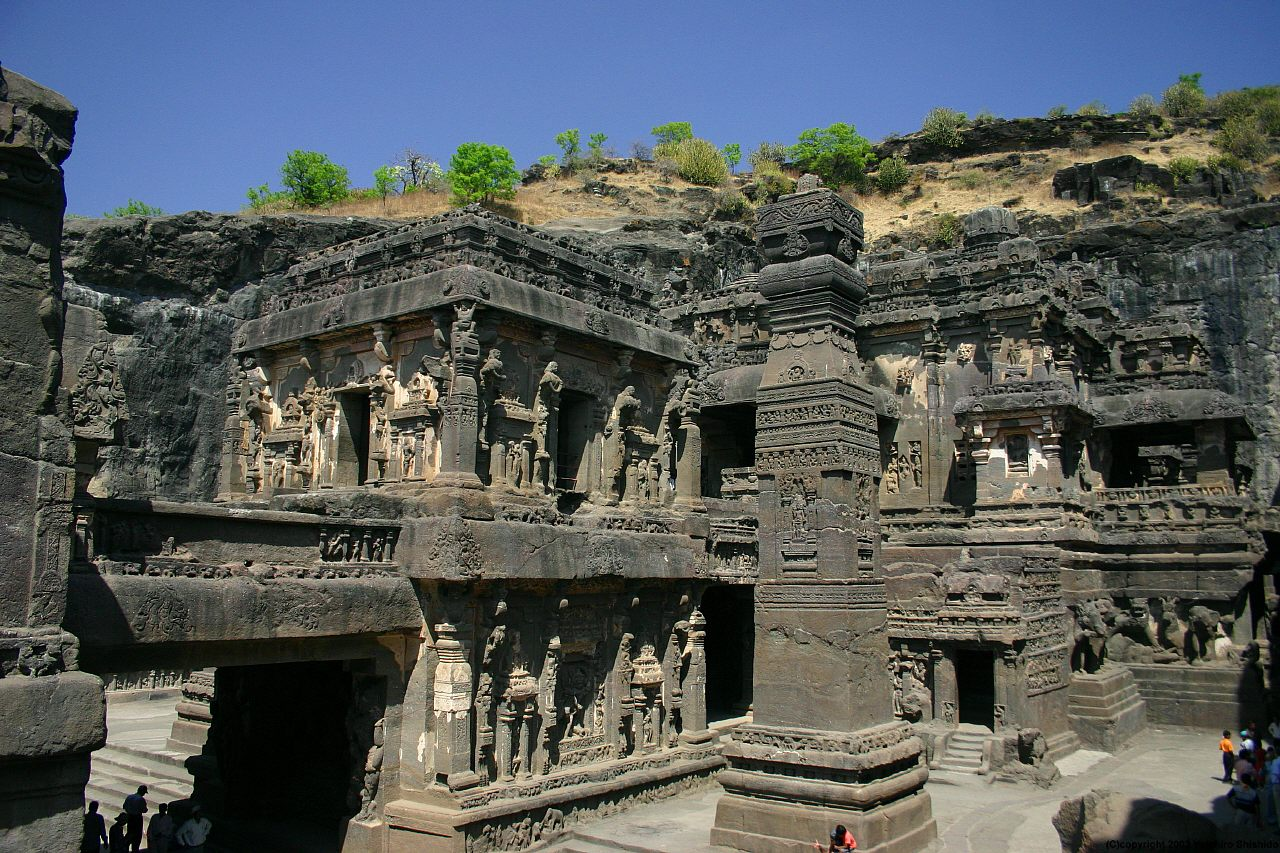
Ellora, rock temple 16, Kailasanatha, is considered the largest rock-hewn Hindu temple

=== Hindu Counter-Reformation ===
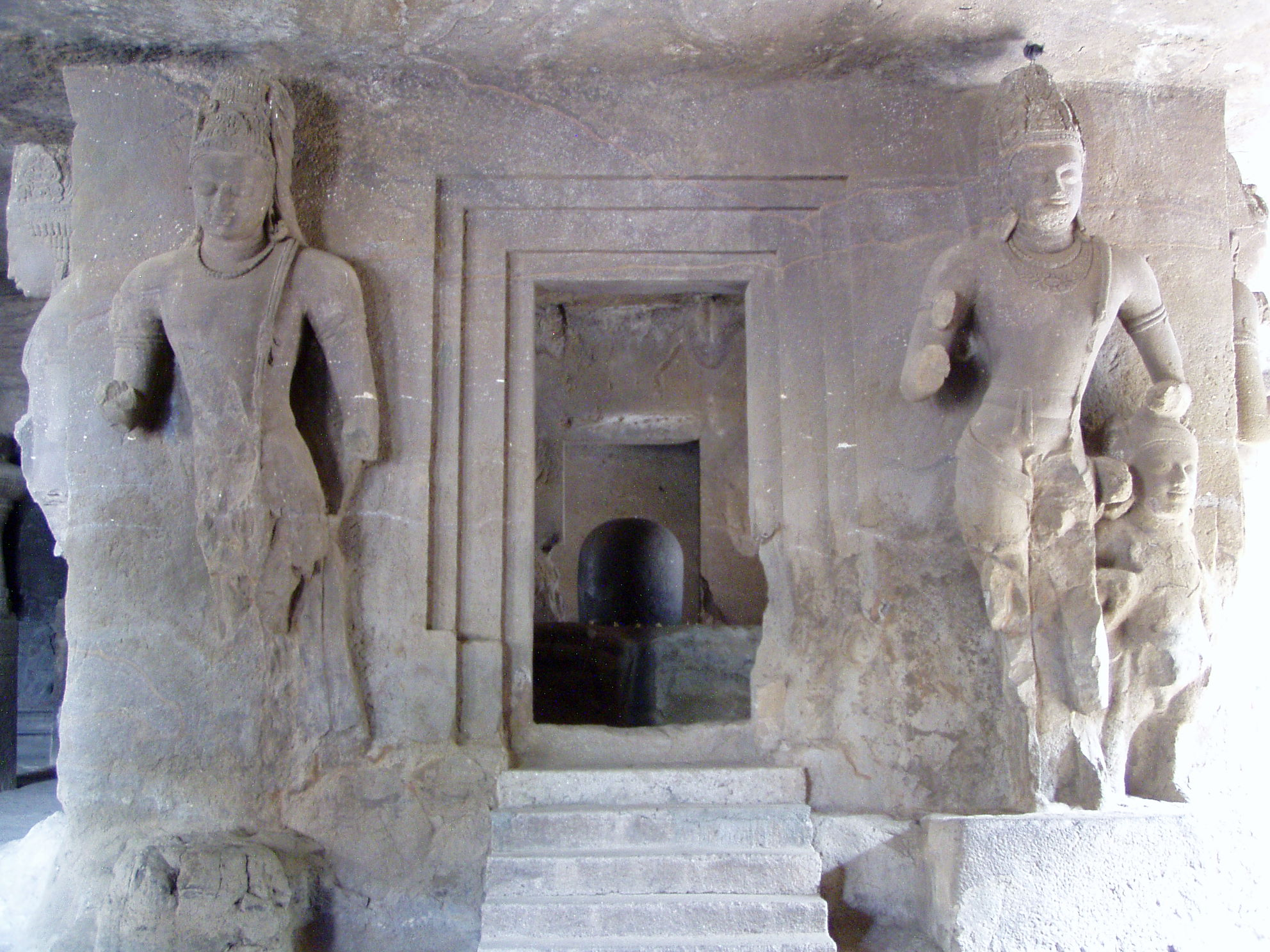
Chapel with Linga, Elephanta near Mumbai, India (Cave 1)

Under the influence of the Hindu Bhakti doctrine (Skt., f., भक्ति, bhakti, devotion, love) tantric, i.e. esoteric elements had found their way into the Buddhist cave temples. In a Buddhist cave of Ellora (No. 12), Buddha statues are joined by the four-armed goddess Cunda as a new element. The Buddhist temple hall in Aurangabad, cave 7, adapts the spatial confinement of the Hindu temple and features a chapel decorated with erotic dance scenes. This far-reaching adaptation to the Hindu formal language was related to the strengthening of Hinduism from the 4th century AD. The Hindu "counter-reformation" resulting from the weakening of the great Indian empires was accompanied by the development of a vital Hindu rock architecture and finally brought building activity on Buddhist cave temples to a large extent to a standstill in the 7th and 8th centuries AD.

Hindu temples had been built exclusively of less durable building materials, mainly wood and clay, until the first post-Christian centuries. The first Hindu cave temples and freestanding stone temples, however, echoed the style of their predecessors. The influx of funds from Hindu benefactors enabled more Hindu cave temples to be modeled out of rock in several Indian regions beginning in the 7th century CE, including in present-day Karnataka (Badami, Buddhist, Hindu, Jain, 6th-8th century CE, four cave temples), Madhya Pradesh (Udaigiri), Maharashtra (Pataleshwar in Pune), Orissa (Gupetswar), and in Tamil Nadu (see Pallava architecture). In addition to Elephanta and Ellora in the northwest of the Indian subcontinent, the UNESCO World Heritage Site includes Mamallapuram near Chennai in southern India, which is also Hindu. Some Jaina temples built in the same period are located in Maharashtra (Ellora), Madhya Pradesh (Udayagiri and Gwalior) and eastern Orissa (Udayagiri and Khandagiri in natural caves).

=== Classic temple structure ===
The function of Hindu cave temples as sanctuaries and ritual sites for holding a puja (Skt., f., पूजा, pūjā, obeisance), fire and sacrificial ceremonies, recitations, and other religious acts led to the development of numerous different forms of construction, all of which center on the divine as the object of worship. Hindu cave temples are also characterized by tendencies developed in the field of free building. The Hindu temple is spatially divided into garbhagriha as the main room and mandapa as the vestibule. The garbhagriha (Skt., garbha, womb) forms a mostly unlit cult chapel that contains the holy of holies, the image of the deity or the linga, a symbol closely associated with the Hindu deity Shiva. In front of the garbhagriha, one or more mandapas are lined up in an axis as entrance or temple halls with colonnade of columns. The monk cells of Buddhist complexes are omitted in Hindu cave temples.

On the basis of the extensive Hindu cave temples of Ellora in Maharashtra, according to Herbert and Ingeborg Plaeschke, several central construction types of Hindu cave temples can be distinguished, which have wide distribution:

- Buildings derived from a cave porch, with direct access to the holy of holies (for example, at Badami and Ellora),
- temples that mimic the plan of a courtyard house with an inner square of columns (at Elephanta, Ellora, and Mamallapuram), and
- Cave temples derived directly from contemporary Hindu open-air construction (Ellora and Mamallapuram).

Due to the triumphant advance of Hindu temple construction in western India since the 7th century AD, the last variant acquires special significance. Hindu cave temples of the last construction type largely follow the ground plan of the Hindu temple open-air of South Indian type with holy of holies (Garbhagriha), temple tower (Skt., विमान, vimāna), entrance and temple hall (Mandapa) and occasionally a small pavilion isolated from the main building with the image of the humpback bull Nandi, the mount of Shiva. A further development of this variant of Hindu cave temples is the Kailasanatha temple, a monolithic rock temple at Ellora. This free-standing rock temple in a rock pit, which is closed off to the outside by a monumental two-story Gopuram, is considered to be probably the most impressive Hindu rock temple with a side length of 46 meters.

== Cave temples in other regions of Asia ==
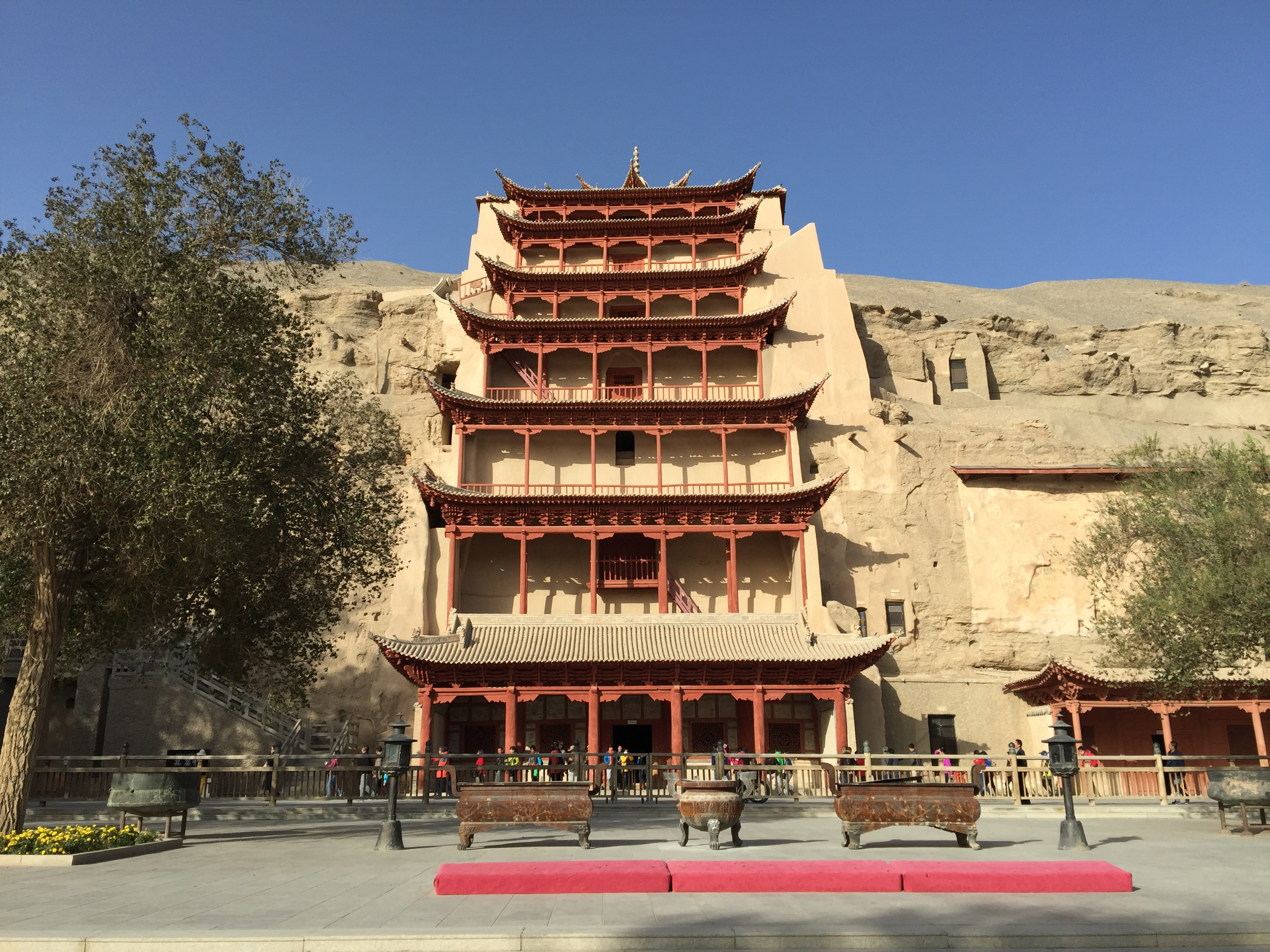
The Mogao Grottoes near Dunhuang, Gansu Province, China

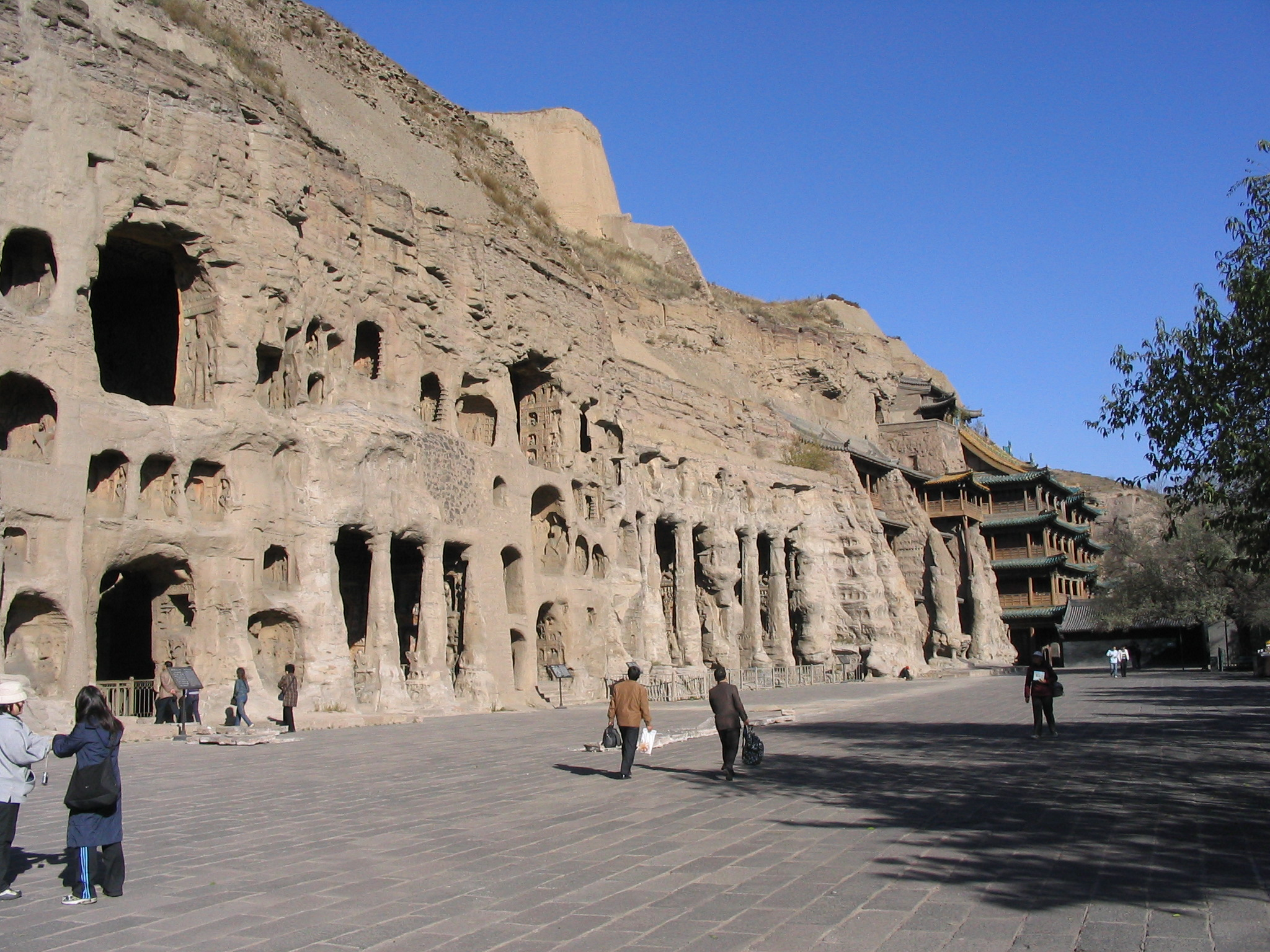
The Yungang Grottoes near Datong, China

=== Spread via the Silk Road ===
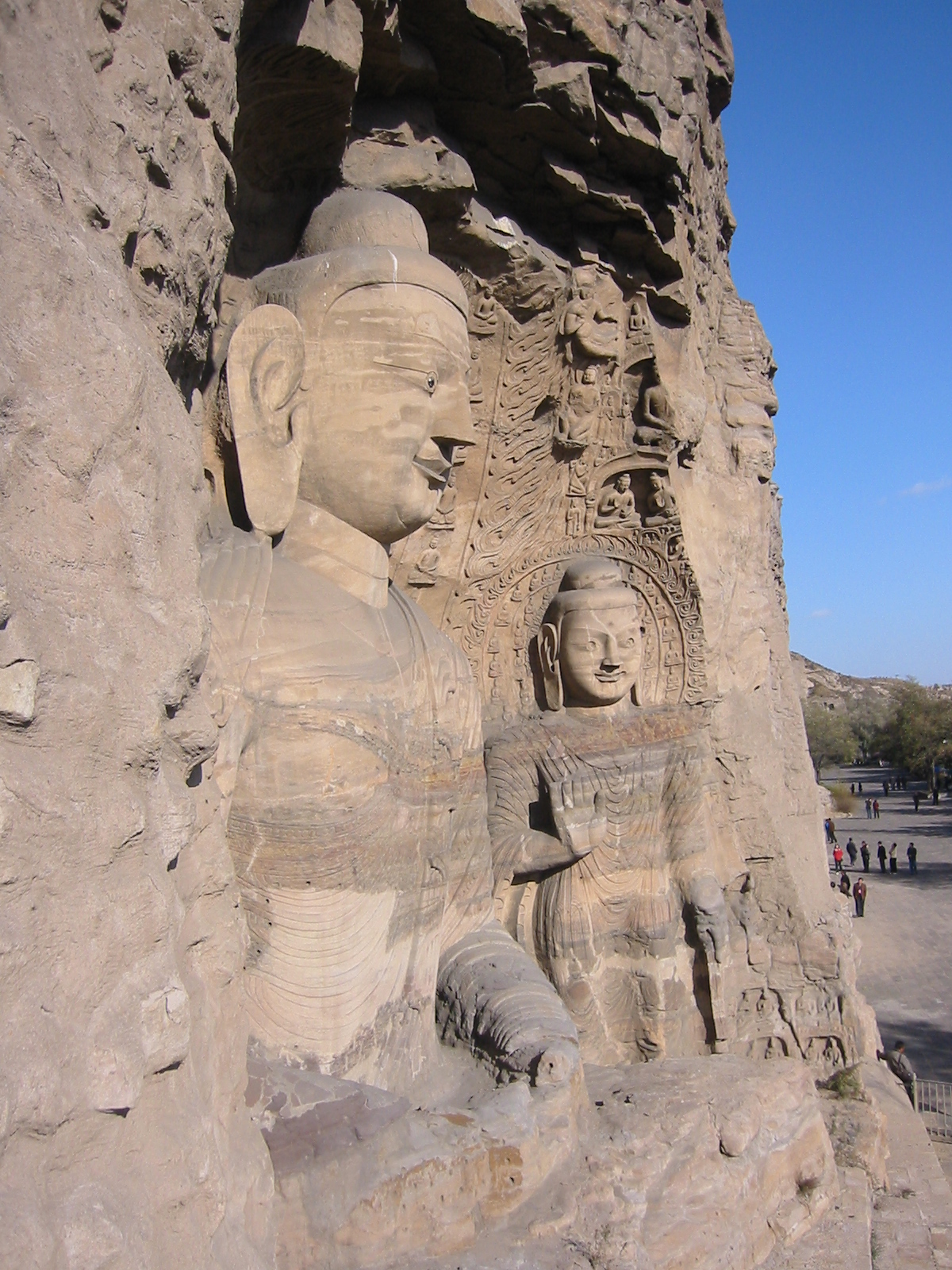
Buddha statues of the Yungang Grottoes near Datong, China

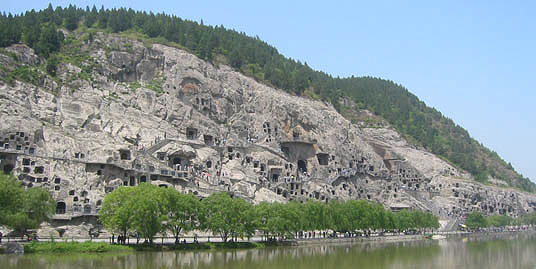
The Longmen Grottoes near Luoyang viewed from Manshui Bridge, China, 2,345 caves.

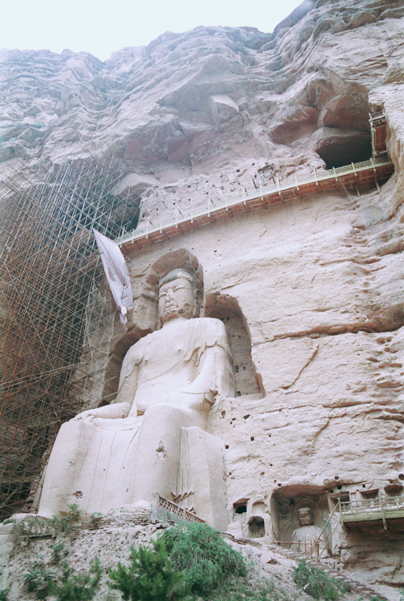
Bingling Temple, great Maitreya Buddha, China

The extensive Buddhist and Hindu cave temple complexes of ancient India have been imitated in numerous regions of Asia since the second century AD. Buddhism came to Central Asia from India along long-distance trade routes, especially the northern route of the Silk Road. On the territory of today's Afghanistan, Persian-influenced cave temples developed on a large scale in and around the Bamiyan valley with its side valleys Kakrak and Foladi (Koh-i-Baba mountains, since 2nd century, about 20. 000 caves), near Haibak in Bactria (Hazar Sam, since 2nd century, about 200 caves) as well as near Jalalabad (Haddah, Allahnazar, Baswal, 2nd-5th century, 150 caves, Dauranta, since 2nd century, Kajitulu as well as Siah-Kok).

Cave temples spread to China via Central Asia, most intensively during the Northern Wei Dynasty in the 4th and 5th centuries. In the course of this northward spread, numerous extensive Buddhist temple complexes (Dunhuang, Kuqa, Turfan, and others) emerged along the Silk Road and the basins of the Yellow River and Yangtze River between the 4th and 9th centuries (Northern Wei Dynasty, Sui Dynasty, and Tang Dynasty), emancipating themselves from their Indian models.

=== Construction features ===
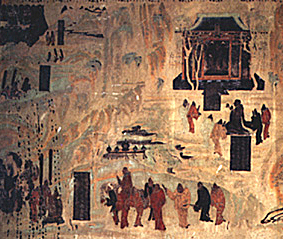
Mural painting in the Mogao Grottoes, Dunhuang, China

The cave temples that developed along the Silk Road are also characterized, in addition to cult and teaching niches and monk cells, by a stupa placed in the center, often represented by a square central pillar. This bears Buddhist statues and was ritually circumambulated (pradakshina) by monks and lay Buddhist followers with the intention of accumulating salvation. The ceiling designs of Chinese cave temples are particularly varied, including ceilings in the shape of an inverted bucket, an octagon, or a flat checkerboard ceiling.

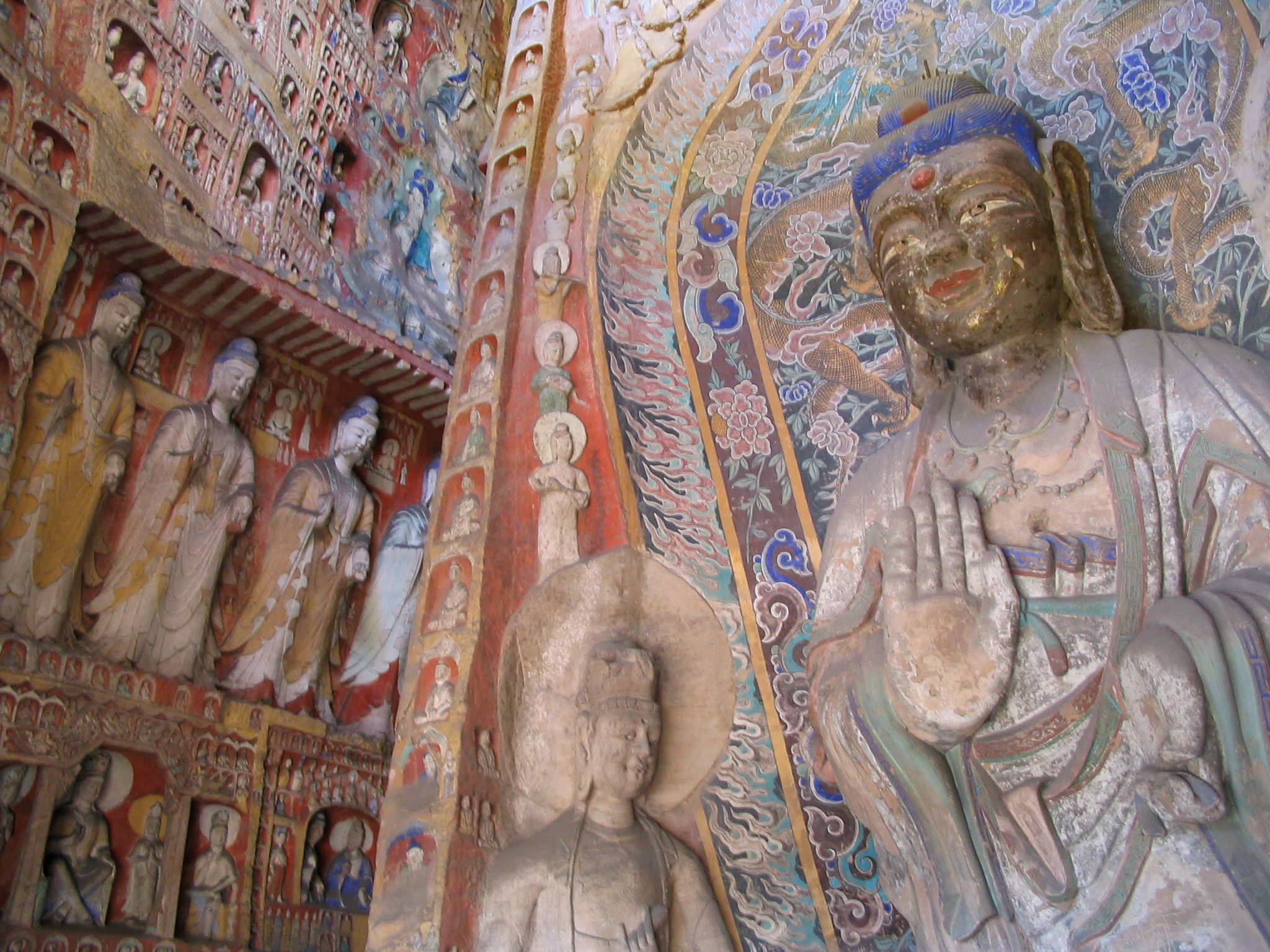
Yungang Grottoes near Datong (Cave 11), China

In the well-preserved Mogao grottoes, the ceiling panels are often filled with painting, embodying the cosmological idea of the sky dome. Overall, the Chinese cave temples are characterized by more numerous wall and ceiling paintings than their Indian models. In the cave temples of Kizil and in Bamiyan, the popularity of the "lantern ceiling," a central ceiling field filled with squares that diminish upward, is striking.

The interiors of Central and East Asian cave temples are usually completely covered with groups of carved stone figures, reliefs, and ornaments. From this rich array of figures, larger configurations in niches stand out, especially the colossal statues of the seated Buddha as world ruler and his standing companion figures that dominate in Yungang and Longmen.

=== Flowering in Central and East Asia ===
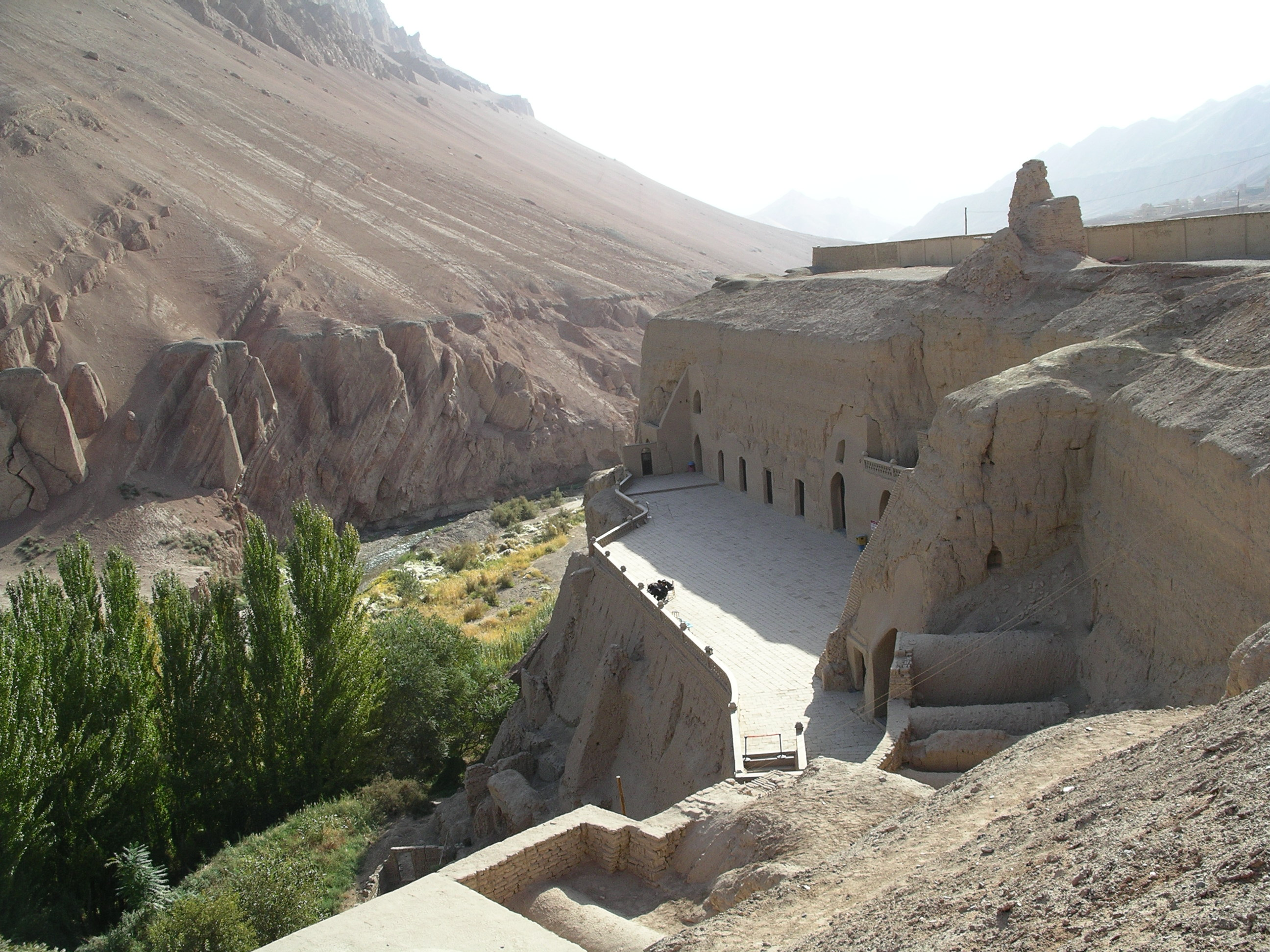
Bezeklik Caves near Turfan in Xinjiang, China

Numerous cave temple complexes in Central and East Asia survive, including three Chinese sites with UNESCO World Heritage status:

- the Mogao Grottoes or "Thousand Buddha Caves," part of the Dunhuang Grottoes near Dunhuang (Gansu Province, 4th-14th centuries, 492 caves preserved), where a Daoist monk discovered some 50,000 ancient text documents dating from the 4th to 11th centuries in 1900 (now partly owned by the British Museum in London),
- the Yungang or "Cloud Ridge Grottoes" near Datong (Shaanxi Province, 5th/6th century, 252 caves), modeled after the Mogao Grottoes and featuring 51,000 statues and wooden shelters dating back to 1621 that still stand today,
- the Longmen or "Dragon Gate Grottoes" near Luoyang (Henan Province, 5th-8th centuries, 2345 caves), whose more than 10,000 sculptures were severely damaged during the Chinese Cultural Revolution between 1966 and 1976.

The total of over 250 Buddhist and quite rare Daoist cave temple complexes throughout China also include:

Province	City	Cave temple	Date of origin	Notes
Gansu province	50 km southwest of Lánzhōu	Bingling Temple	since 5th c.	183 caves
	Wuwei	Tiantishan Caves	6th c.	
	Guazhou (formerly Anxi)	Yulin Caves	since the 5th century	42 caves
	45 km southeast of the city of Tianshui	Maijishan Grottoes	ca. since the 5th century	194 caves
Hebei province	Handan	Xiangtangshan Caves	6th c.	
Henan province	Gongyi	Gongxian Grottoes	since 6th c.	
Ningxia Autonomous region	Guyuan	Xumishan Grottoes		
Shaanxi province	Binxian	Dafosi Grottoes	7th c.	107 caves
Shandong province	Qingzhou	Tuoshan Grottoes	6th/7th c.	5 caves
Shanxi province	Taiyuan	Tianlongshan Grottoes	6th c.	25 caves, over 500 sculptures
Sichuan province	Guangyuan	Huangze Temple		6 caves
Tibet Autonomous region	Zanda County	Donggar Ruins, Piyang Grottoes		200 caves, 1000 caves
Xinjiang Autonomous region	Turfan near Taklamakan Desert	Bezeklik Caves	5th-9th c.	67 caves
	Kizil and Kuqa	Kizil Caves	3rd-8th/9th c.	236 caves recorded (Kizil)
Zhejiang province	Hangzhou	Feilaifeng Rock Sculptures (Lingyin Temple)	10th-14th c.	over 470 sculptures in limestone

Only isolated cave temples exist in other regions of East Asia, including South Korea (Seokguram near Gyeongju, 8th century, a cave with 37 sculptures, listed as a UNESCO World Heritage Site) and Japan (Usuki on Kyūshū Island, 12th century, Buddha statues in tuff). In Japanese, Buddhist cave temples are called sekkutsu jiin (石窟寺院).

=== Use of natural caves in South and Southeast Asia ===
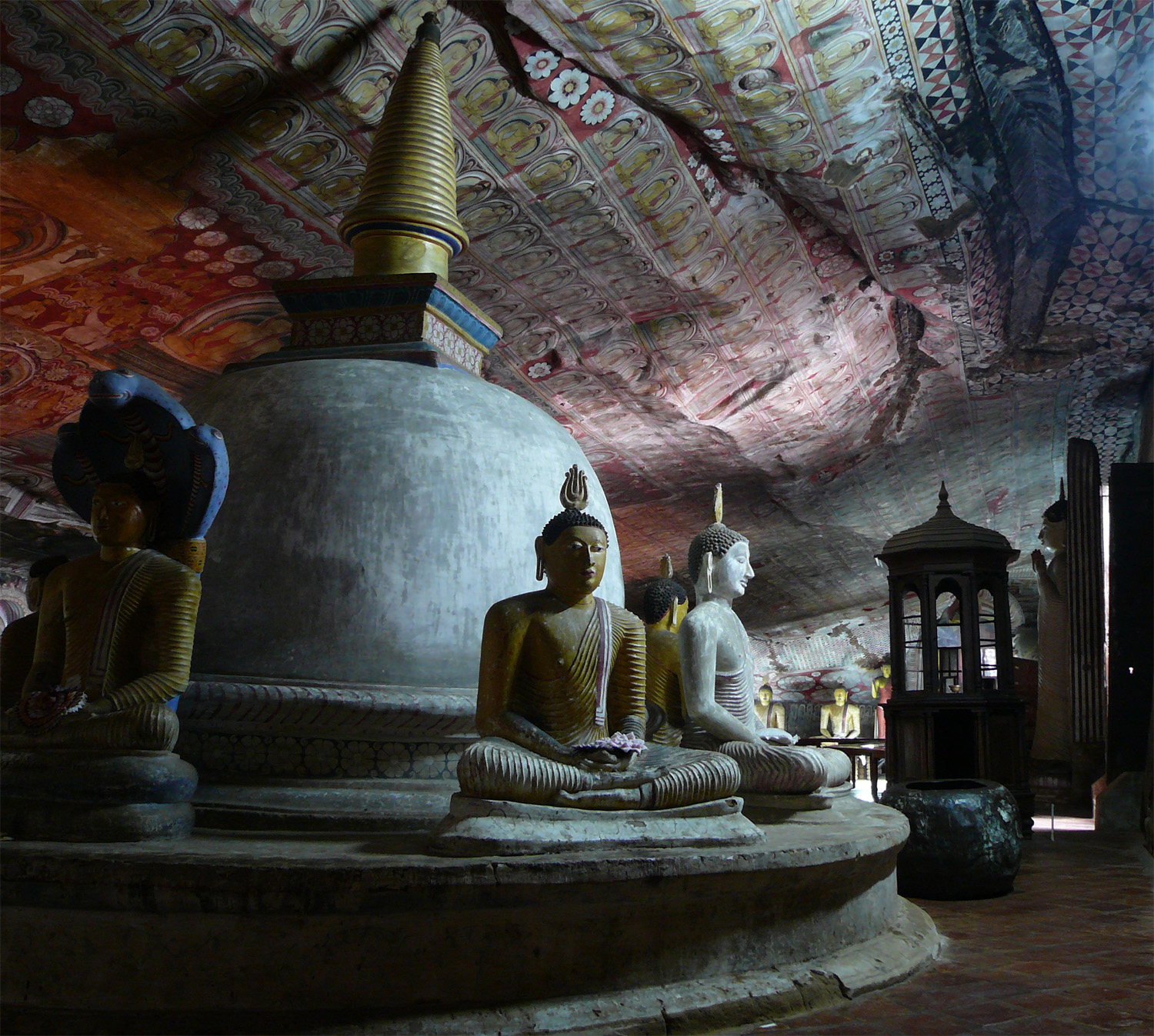
Dambulla Caves, Central Province, Sri Lanka

The spread of Theravada Buddhism (Skt., स्थविरवाद, sthaviravāda; Pali, theravāda, school of elders) was from northeast and southeast India to south and southeast Asia. A second strand of expansion ran north across Myanmar. Both strands eventually met with Mahayana Buddhism spreading from the north. The cave sanctuaries of Sri Lanka as well as the countries of Southeast Asia developed largely independently and adopted from their Indian pendants mainly the stupas, Buddha statues, lavish murals or the atmospheric lighting effects.

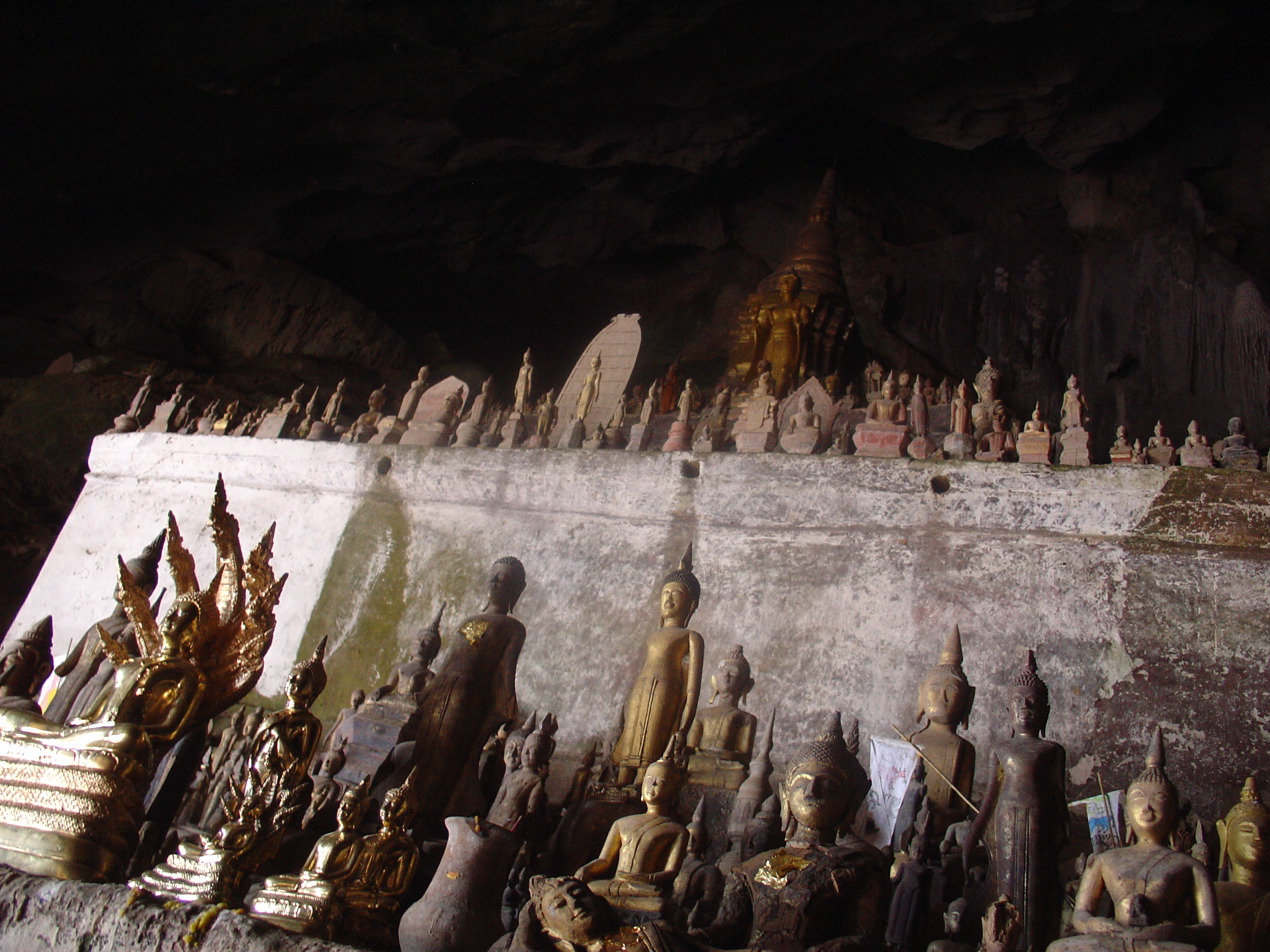
Some of the 4,000 Buddha statues in the Pak Ou caves near Luang Prabang, Laos

While subterranean sanctuaries in Myanmar and Indonesia, for example, continued to be built as artificial caves in accordance with the Indian and Chinese type, temples in Southeast Asia were predominantly built in or near natural caves, forgoing costly rock construction work. These cave temples were equipped with numerous Buddha statues or Hindu deities, other sculptures and elaborate murals. In many cases, these sanctuaries replaced older animistic places of worship and sacrifice that had existed in pre-Buddhist times (for example, Goa Gajah in Bali or Huyen Khong in Vietnam).

This variant of cave sanctuaries is found sporadically in other regions, but primarily in Southeast Asia. Of particular importance is the Aluvihara cave temple near Matale (Central Province of Sri Lanka, from about the 3rd century BCE, 13 caves with murals and Buddha statues), which in the 1st century BCE, under the patronage of King Vaṭṭagāmaṇī Abhaya, was the site of the 4th Buddhist Council of the Theravada tradition. During the council, the Buddha's teachings, which up to that time had been transmitted exclusively orally for centuries, were put down in writing for the first time in the form of the Pali Canon.

=== Highly frequented pilgrimage destinations ===
Quite a few of the sanctuaries created in natural caves today form highly frequented pilgrimage and sacrificial sites (for example, the Pak Ou caves in Laos or Pindaya in Myanmar, where Buddha statues are traditionally left as offerings), places of historical remembrance (Dambulla in Sri Lanka, a former refuge of King Vaṭṭagāmaṇī Abhaya), extensive teaching and meditation centers (Wat Suwan Kuha and Pha Plong in Thailand or Pindaya in Myanmar), burial sites (Pak Ou Caves in Laos), art and museum space (Batu Caves in Malaysia), or imposing vantage points with restaurant operations (Sam Poh Tong and Kek Lok Tong in Malaysia).

Significant examples of sanctuaries in natural caves are:

State	City (province)	Cave temple	Date of origin	Notes
Indonesia	at Padangbai	Goa Lawah (Bat Cave)	11th c.	Hindu, "with thousands of bats considered sacred".
	also plants in artificial caves near Ubud on Bali	Goa Gajah (Elephant Cave)	11th c.	probably former hermitage of Shivaite hermits; Buddhist caves destroyed
Laos	at Luang Prabang	Pak Ou Caves (Tham Ting)	5th-7th c.	two caves, accessible only via Mekong
Malaysia	Selangor at Kuala Lumpur	Batu Caves		Hindu
	at Gunung Rapat near Ipoh	the great Sam Poh Tong as well as Kek Lok Tong		there a total of 14 Buddhist and Hindu cave temples in limestone rocks
Myanmar	near Hpa-an (Kayin State)	Kawgun Cave	about 15th century	in limestone rocks
	Pindaya (Shan State)	Pindaya		more than 8000 Buddha figurines
	also artificial caves: at Monywa (Sagaing Region)	Po Win Daung (Po-Win-Berge)	17th c.	947 caves with, according to Burmese data, 446,444 Buddha statues
	Pyin Oo Lwin	Peik Kinn Myaing		Hindu-Buddhist
Sri Lanka	Dambulla (Central Province)	Dambulla	since 1st century BC	About 80 caves, largest temple complex in Sri Lanka (2,100 m^{2}), UNESCO World Heritage Site
Thailand	Phang Nga province	Wat Suwan Kuha (Monkey Cave)		two caves in limestone rocks
	Chiang Dao	Wat Tham (= cave temple) Pha Plong		Meditation Center
	at Krabi	Wat Tham Sua (Tiger Cave)		Meditation center with over 260 ordained
Vietnam	Ngu Hanh Son Mountains (Marble Mountains) at Đà Nẵng	Huyen Khong Cave		formerly Hindu-Buddhist

== Cave temple in modern times ==
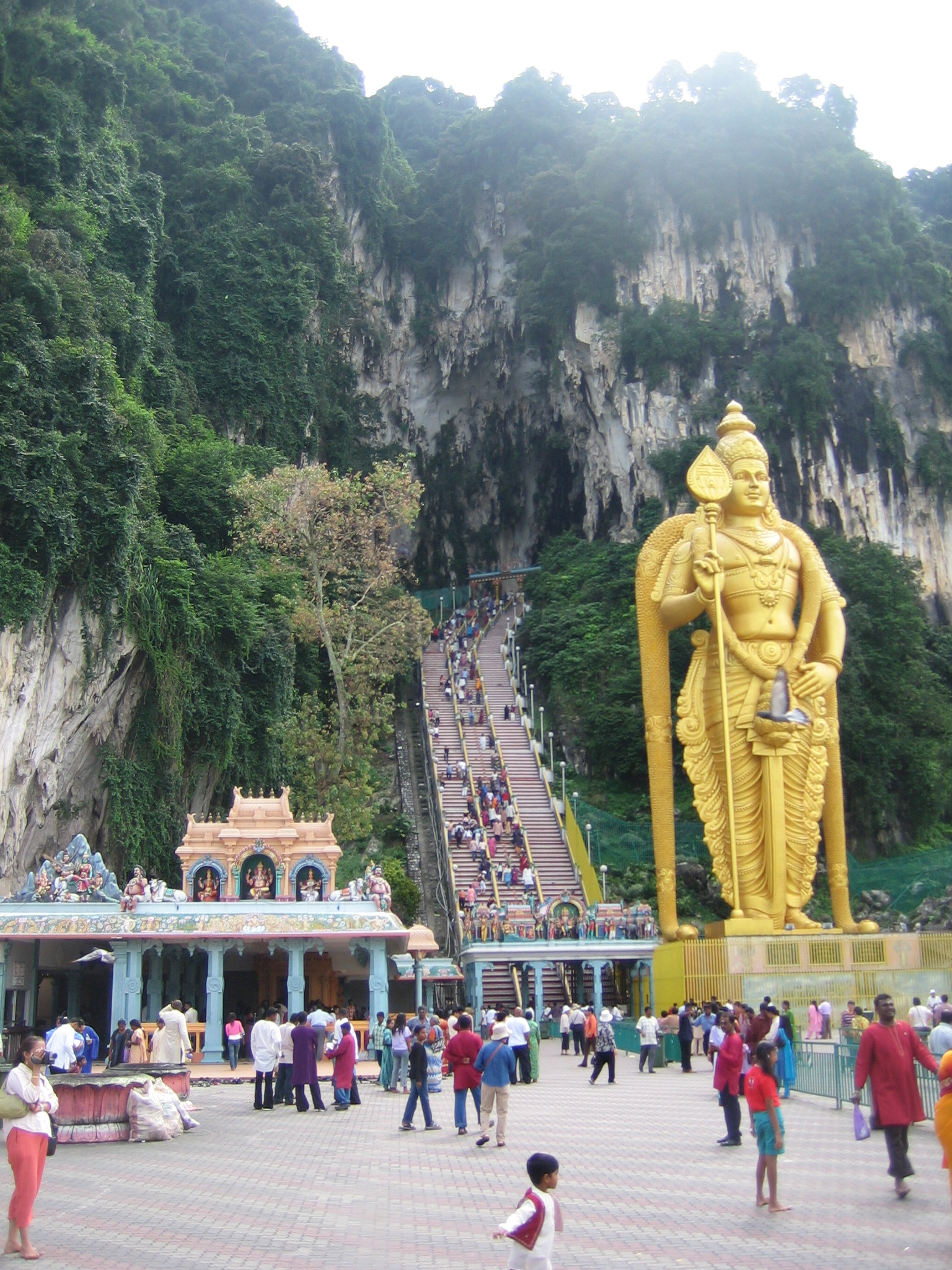
Batu Caves (Hindu) with Murugan statue near Kuala Lumpur, Malaysia

=== Relocation of a tradition ===
The Arab conquests of the 8th century, monastery destructions and the expulsion of monk and nun communities drastically limited the expansion of Indian cave temples. At the same time, as mendicant monks and nuns, the religious depended on lay followers to provide them with clothing, food, and medicine on a permanent basis. In many cases, however, lay followers had converted to Hinduism over time. With exceptions such as Dhamnar in Madhya Pradesh and Kholvi in Rajasthan, active use of Buddhist cave temples declined due to diminishing sponsorship by ruling houses and surrounding communities. The gradual decline of Buddhism in India brought monastery and temple construction to a halt. Existing sites were threatened with destruction in the wake of renewed invasions by Central Asian powers beginning in the 12th century.

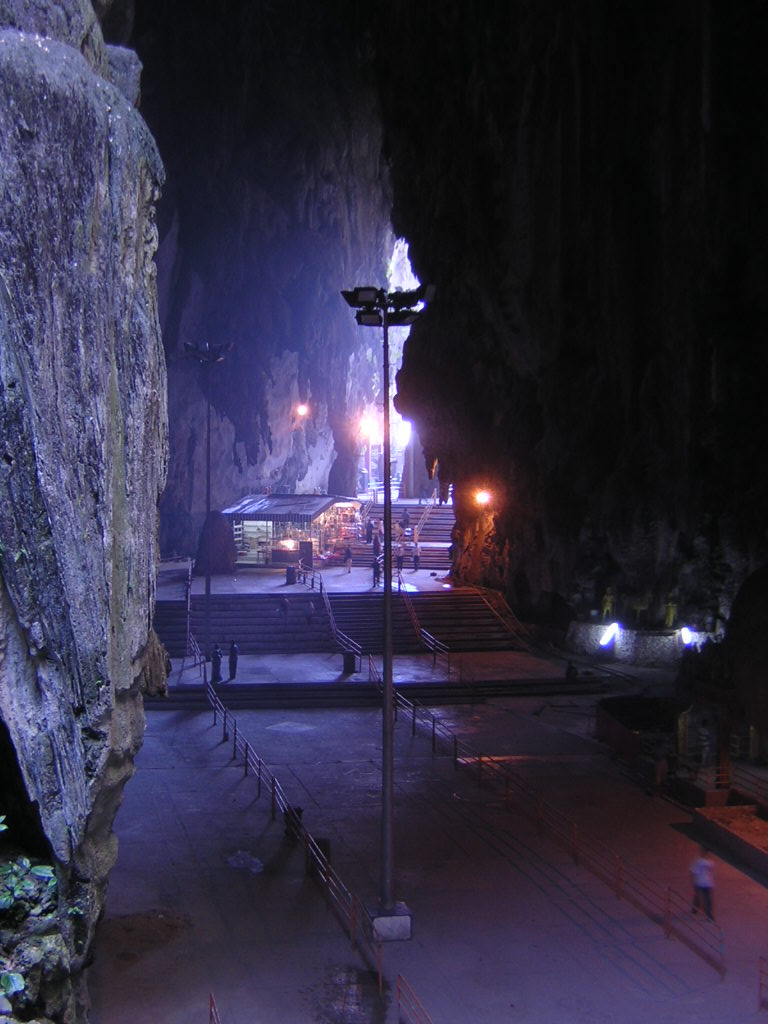
Interior of Batu Caves near Kuala Lumpur

The use of meditation caves remained a living Buddhist tradition across the boundaries of individual doctrines. In late esoteric Buddhism (Vajrayana), the Tibetan Kagyu school revived the practice of hermiting. The tantric master Milarepa, considered one of Tibet's greatest poets, retreated as an ascetic yoga to cool mountain caves for several years of meditation in the 11th century and found numerous imitators. A meditation direction characteristic of the Kagyüpa is the meditation of "inner heat" (gTum mo, Tummo), which increases the meditator's body heat. Tummo is said to have protected hermits such as Milarepa from extreme cold in the mountain caves of Tibetan snow country, whose average altitude is 4,500 meters.

The highly developed Indian tradition of rock architecture, which had been influential for a long time, also lived on outside India. A focus of the development and expansion of cave temples in modern times was South Asia (excluding India) and Southeast Asia. This is evidenced by numerous large rock and cave temples in Sri Lanka (Degaldoruwa Vihraya, Kandy, 17th century CE and an expansion of the Dambulla cave temples in the 18th century CE to three other caves), in present-day Myanmar (Po Win Daung, Tilawkaguru), and in Thailand (Khao Luang near Phetchaburi), which were first built or significantly expanded in the 17th and 18th centuries.

=== Rediscoveries and repurposing ===
In modern times, some of the most important cave sanctuaries, whose existence had been forgotten, were rediscovered. Hidden wall paintings, stone reliefs, stupas, statues and sometimes valuable text documents came to public attention through the spectacular discovery of individual sites such as Ajanta in Maharashtra by a British officer in 1819 and the Mogao Grottoes near Dun Huang in China by a Daoist monk in 1900 and again by the British archaeologist Aurel Stein in 1907. Goa Gajah in Bali was rediscovered by a Dutch official in 1923 and Bingling Temple in the Chinese province of Gansu in 1953. Art theft and looting by foreign expeditions were often the immediate result.

In varying forms, cave temples have continued to be a part of Buddhist and Hindu traditions in modern times. In the Aluvihara temple on Sri Lanka, the Fourth Buddhist Council of the Theravada tradition is commemorated annually with the Aluvihara Sangayana Perahara, during which the Buddha's teachings were recorded in writing for the first time on site. On the occasion of the Sixth Buddhist councils (Theravada tradition), a replica of the Sattapanni Cave, where the First Council had taken place immediately after the death of the Buddha, was built in the capital of Myanmar in the middle of the 20th century. The monumental Maha Pasana Guha accommodated a total of 2,500 Buddhist monks and 7,500 lay people during the Sixth Council in Yangon between 1954 and 1956.

In addition to spiritual use, individual cave temples were also used for political or military purposes in times of war and crisis. The Goa Lawah Cave in Indonesia was the site of a political conference held in 1904 to defend against the advancing Dutch. Huyen Khong Cave in Vietnam served as a hospital and shelter for local fighters during the Vietnam War, as remains evident from numerous damages to the cave walls. According to a plaque, a Viet Cong women's unit shot down 19 American fighter planes from here.

=== Cave temple in Islamic environment ===
In the 19th and 20th centuries, new cave temples were completed, especially in Malaysia. Mahayana Buddhists and Daoists from China who had immigrated to Malaysia emerged as initiators of such sacred buildings. The richly decorated Perak Tong Temple (1926) in the Malaysian city of Ipoh, which is predominantly inhabited by ethnic Chinese, was donated and designed by Buddhist immigrants from China, as was the cave temple Ling Xian Yan (since 1967) near Gunung Rapat near Ipoh. The construction of the Daoist Chin Swee Cave Temple on Malaysia's Genting Plateau was financed by a Chinese businessman between 1976 and 1993. A wave of Islamization that Malaysia underwent in the 1970s did not detract from this construction activity, which was mainly supported by wealthy immigrants.

Individual complexes were further developed over the decades. The first of the extensive Hindu Batu Caves near the Malaysian capital Kuala Lumpur was consecrated as a temple in 1891. In 1920, an elaborate wooden staircase was added. A 42.7-meter statue of the Hindu god Murugan was completed in 2006 after three years of construction and has been the center of the Tamil Thaipusam festival every February since. This "most ecstatic penitential and thanksgiving festival" of the Hindus commemorates the mythical victory of Murugan, the son of the Hindu deities Shiva and Parvati, over three demons.

While the Asian cave temples in their Indian beginnings were mainly lonely retreats for world-weary ascetics and Buddhist mendicant monks, several millennia later during Thaipusam in Malaysia they are the focus of one of the most dazzling spiritual events of modern times. The secluded and contemplative life of monks and nuns in impassable areas has given way to a popular intoxicating mass procession and its trance-like flagellation rites.

== Bibliography ==
Outside Asia

- Johannes Dümichen: Der ägyptische Felsentempel von Abu Simbal. Hempel, Berlin 1869.
- Rosemarie Klemm: Vom Steinbruch zum Tempel: Beobachtungen zur Baustruktur einiger Felstempel der 18. und 19. Dynastie im ägyptischen Mutterland. In: Zeitschrift für Ägyptische Sprache und Altertumskunde, Bd. 115 (1988), pp. 41–51.
- Heinrich und Ingrid Kusch: Kulthöhlen in Europa: Götter, Geister und Dämonen. vgs, Köln 2001.
- Hans J. Martini: Geologische Probleme bei der Rettung der Felsentempel von Abu Simbel. Vandenhoeck u. Ruprecht, Göttingen 1970.

South Asia

- K. V. Soundara Rajan: Cave Temples of the Deccan. Archaeological Survey of India, Delhi 1981.
- K. V. Soundara Rajan: Rock-Cut Temple Styles. Somaiya, Mumbai 1998.
- Carmel Berkson: The Caves at Aurangabad. Early Buddhist Tantric Art in India. Mapin Int., New York 1986.
- Herbert Plaeschke und Ingeborg Plaeschke: Indische Felsentempel und Höhlenklöster. Köhler & Amelang, Leipzig 1982. [zu Ajanta und Ellora]
- Bernd Rosenheim: Die Welt des Buddha. Frühe Stätten buddhistischer Kunst in Indien. Philipp von Zabern, Mainz 2006.
- Dietrich Seckel: Kunst des Buddhismus. Werden, Wanderung und Wandlung. Holle, Baden-Baden 1962.

Central, East and Southeast Asia

- Dunhuang Institute of Cultural Relics (Hrsg.): Die Höhlentempel von Dunhuang. Klett-Cotta, Stuttgart 1982.
- Reza: Der verborgene Buddha. Knesebeck 2003. [zu Xinjiang]
- William Simpson: The Buddhist Caves of Afghanistan. JRAS, N.S. 14, pp. 319–331.
- Pindar Sidisunthorn, Simon Gardner, Dean Smart: Caves of Northern Thailand. River, Bangkok 2007.
- Michael Sullivan: The Cave Temples of Maichishan. University of California Press, Berkeley 1969.
