= Binnayaga Buddhist Caves =

Caves in Rajasthan, India

Binnayaga Caves
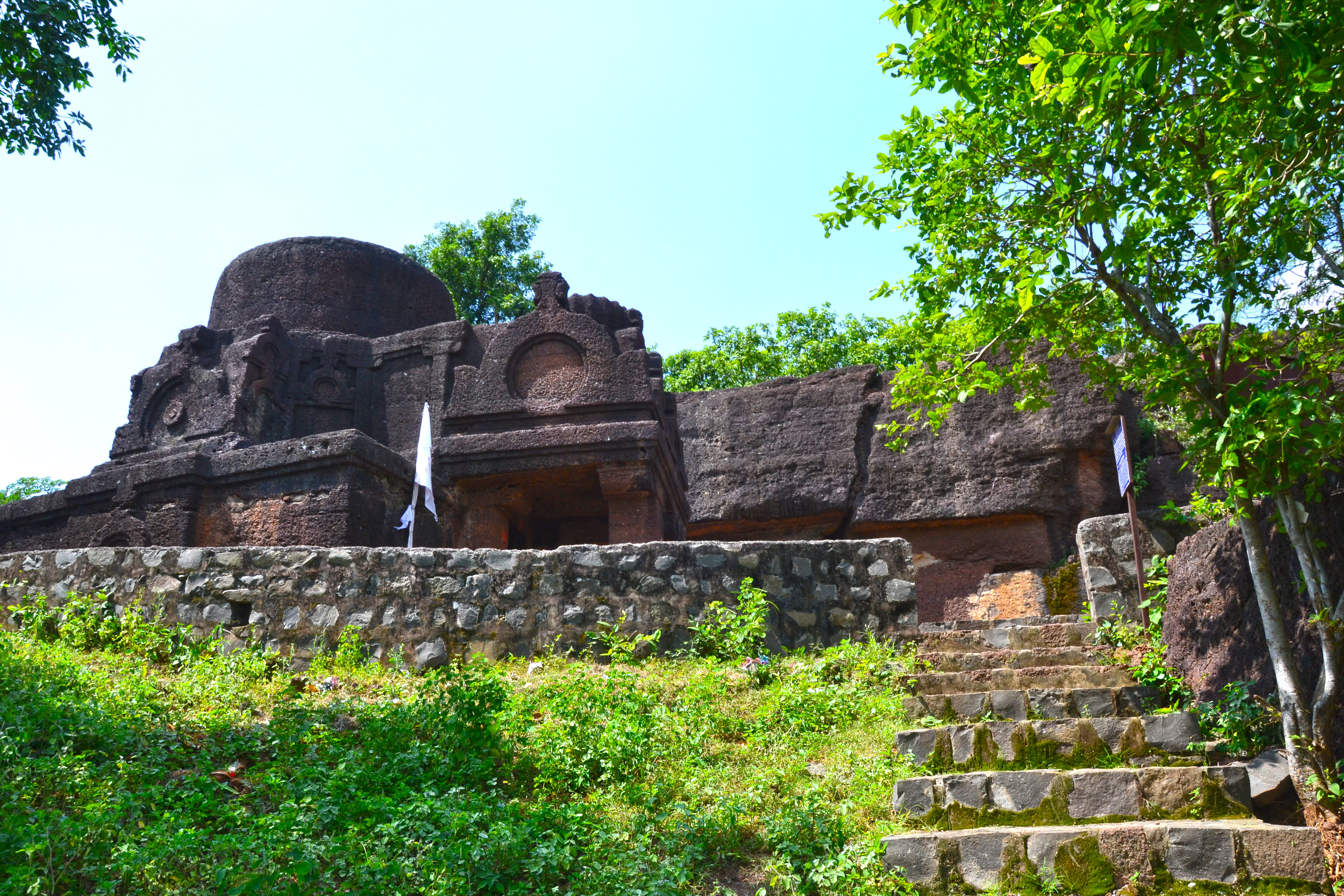
- Binnayaga Caves

- Location within India Location within Rajasthan
- Coordinates: 24.062657°N 75.8925667°E

Binnayaga Buddhist Caves also known as Vinayaka or Vinayaga are located at village Binnayaga in the state of Rajasthan, India. The excavation has around 20 laterite caves facing south from east to west. This is monastic complex, the cells are smaller than Kolvi Caves cell. The stupa shaped sanctuary is the highlight of these caves. It has chaitya which bears windows. Another significant cave has two wings of an open courtyard. "It has at the back a closed lobby with vaulted ceiling and a central door flanked by a cell on either side. The moulded pedestal against the back wall is now empty."

These caves are located 8 miles away from Kolvi.

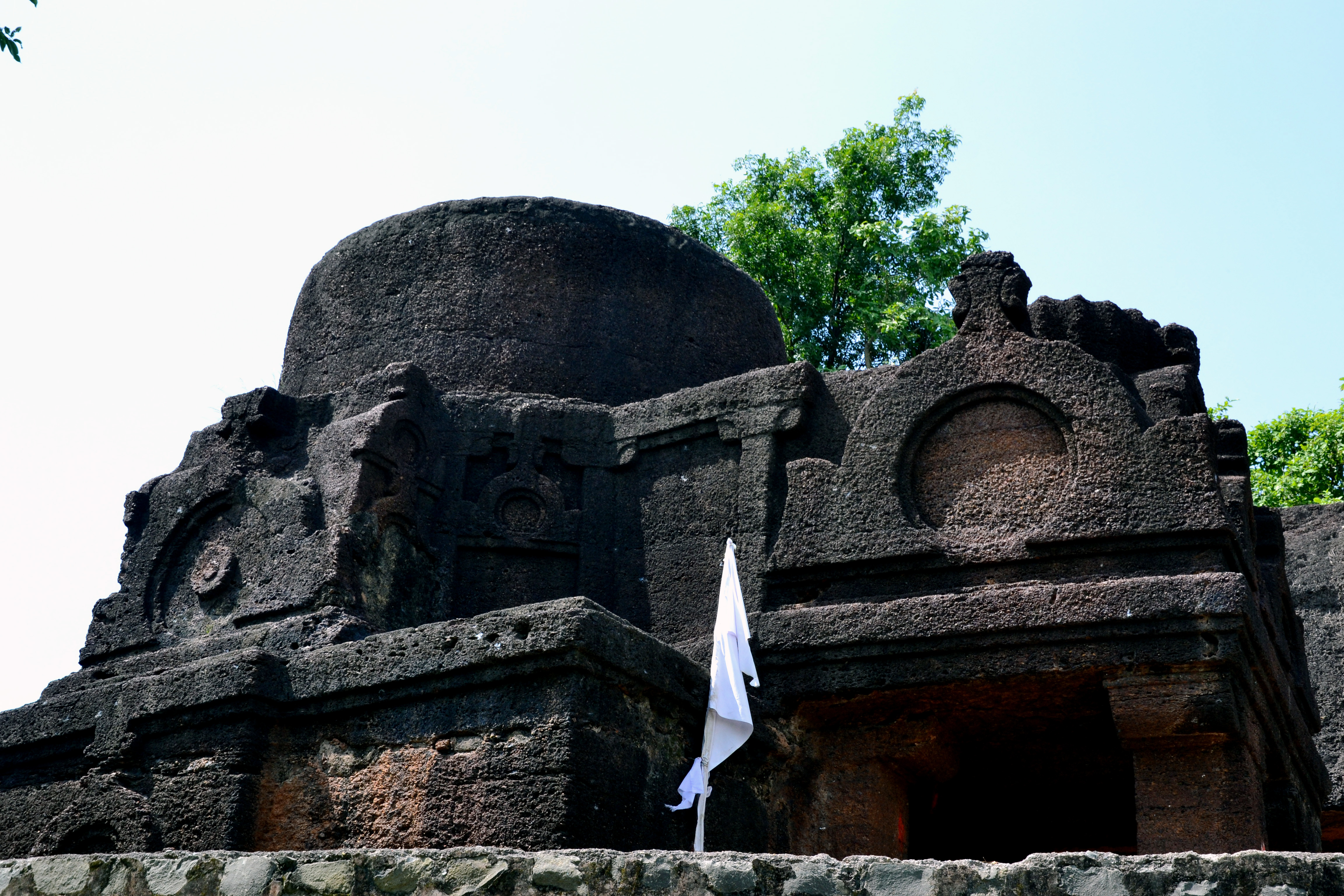
