= Armenian Egyptology Centre =

The Armenian Egyptology Centre (AEC) was established in Armenia on December 25, 2006, under the initiative of director, Dr. Christian Tutundjian de Vartavan, with the support of Prof. Aram Simonyan rector of the Yerevan State University, as well as many personalities of Armenian science and education. Proposal validated, as per the rules of university, by an historic unanimous vote of the High Scientific Committee of Yerevan State University in the Spring of 2007, with over 60 members present. The centre is composed of three full-time staff member with a fourth one in the process of integration.

Dr. Vartavan resigned as director in February, 2015.

The centre is primarily a research centre and one of two main area of specialization is devoted to the plants of ancient Egypt, and all related subfields or fields, including: The landscape of Ancient Egypt, its flora, its agriculture, its vegetal economy otherwise known as economic botany, and in particular plant foods and plant materials. Ancient trade of plant products, perfumes, varnishes, religious oils, and in effect any "plant-related" topic.

Since 2009 a research program has been launched concerning the ancient Egyptian language (hieroglyphs). This is now the second main area of research of AEC.

Yet another specialization is devoted to interconnective studies, including the contribution of the Egyptian civilization to the Armenian Church and Armenian culture. When the last Egyptian temples close their doors (around 392 AD), the Armenian Church has opened hers since several decades (314 AD). In the course of this time overlap, and in view of its close links with the Alexandrian and other oriental churches, it inherited much from Egypt – if not the oldest existing version of Manetho’s classification of Egyptian dynasties (currently in the Matenadaran, Armenia’s national depository of manuscripts). Relations between Egypt and Armenia, on another hand, exist since more than two millennia, with the presence of Armenians in Egypt increasing drastically over centuries; and to the point when Armenians ended occupying the highest political positions, and in one instance even gave to Egypt a female sovereign. Cultural interactions between the two nations, particularly during the Middle-Age have led to many exchanges, in particular linguistics.

== Discoveries ==
1. 2007: Discovery (in collaboration with Dr. D.Meeks of Montpellier University) that one of the two unknown ingredients mentioned by Maanakhtef (New Kingdom) to make a sarcophagus’ varnish is "beeswax" (mnH), opening the door to the pending first reconstruction of an ancient Egyptian varnish.

2. 2007: Discovery that ancient Egyptians had reached the knowledge of "complex-media varnishes "over one thousand years before expected. This discovery changing the history of art and technology as we know it. In fact, it is proposed that these varnishes be labelled as "imperial" [Source: https://journals.uair.arizona.edu/index.php/jaei/article/view/19].

3. 2008: Re-discovery of the art of making various grades of ancient Egyptian blue (pigment). Further opening the door for the rediscovery of the art of sarcophagus making for the "Sarcophagus Project".

4. 2009: Discovery that the widely used word snTr does not mean "incense" but "scent", forcing the retranslation of thousands of inscriptions and a revision of the understanding of major theological texts such as the Daily Ritual, as only practised by the pharaoh or the 1st Prophet.

5. 2009: Discovery that Chapter 36 of the Daily Ritual hides a highly complex and previously unseen multilevel rhyming, anaphoric and chiasmic literary composition. Opening the door for the necessity to re-translate and organise the Daily Ritual and forcing revision of knowledge of ancient Egyptian literature.

6. 2010: General discovery that several Ancient Egyptian numerals are shared with their equivalents in various Indo European languages, as well as with Proto Indo European. Aspects of this discovery have since then been found to have already been seen by a few scholars across history.

7. 2010-2011: Discovery that the above is also the case for a substantial part of the ancient Egyptian vocabulary, as well as for verbal forms, pronouns, adverbs, etc....leading to the conclusion that and ancestral language must have been common to AE and I.E. languages; perhaps that called Nostratic by some linguists. Although, it has just been discovered that the above had been previously stated by one Egyptologist and various linguists; these conclusions have been reached independently and through other means. The preliminary results of this research have now appeared in the form of three articles, two in Advances in Egyptology 2 (one by Vartavan, and one by Arakelyan), as well as one in the centre's AEC Fundamental Research Papers Series (by Vartavan).

8. 2013. Breakthrough in the vocalisation of Ancient Egyptian (https://www.academia.edu/2449061/AEC_Egyptology_Newsletter_No._26_January_23_2013)
