= Emittance =

Emittance may refer to:

- Beam emittance, the area occupied by a beam in a position-and-momentum phase space
- Radiant emittance, the radiant flux emitted by a surface per unit area
- Thermal emittance, emissivity of a surface
