= Reflective surfaces (climate engineering) =

Form of climate engineering

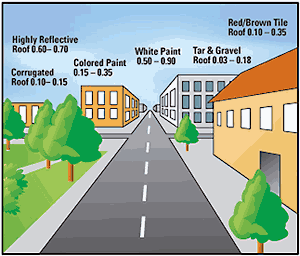
The albedo of several types of roofs (lower values means higher temperatures)

Reflective Surfaces, or ground-based albedo modification (GBAM), is a solar radiation management method of enhancing Earth's albedo (the ability to reflect the visible, infrared, and ultraviolet (UV) wavelengths of the Sun, reducing heat transfer to the surface). The IPCC described GBAM as "whitening roofs, changes in land use management (e.g., no-till farming), change of albedo at a larger scale (covering glaciers or deserts with reflective sheeting and changes in ocean albedo)."

The most well-known type of reflective surface is the cool roof. Cool roofs are primarily associated with white roofs, although they come in a variety of colors and materials and are available for commercial and residential buildings, as well as bus roofs. Painting roofs in white or pale colors is encouraged by legislation in some areas (e.g., California).

This technique is limited in its ultimate effectiveness by the surface area available for treatment. This technique can give between 0.01 and 0.19 W/m^{2} of globally averaged negative forcing, depending on whether cities or all settlements are so treated. This is small relative to the 3.7 W/m^{2} of positive forcing from a doubling of atmospheric carbon dioxide. Moreover, while in small cases, it can be achieved at little or no cost by simply selecting different materials, it can be costly if implemented on a larger scale.

A 2009 Royal Society report states that "the overall cost of a 'white roof method' covering an area of 1% of the land surface (about 10^{12} m^{2}) would be about $300 billion/yr, making this one of the least effective and most expensive methods considered." However, it can reduce the need for air conditioning, which emits carbon dioxide and contributes to global warming.

== Method ==
As a method to address global warming, the IPCC 2018 report indicated that the potential for global temperature reduction was "small," yet was in high agreement over the recognition of temperature changes of 1 – 3 °C on a regional scale. Limited application of reflective surfaces can mitigate urban heat island effect.

Reflective surfaces can be used to change the albedo of agricultural and urban areas, noting that a 0.04 – 0.10 albedo change in urban and agricultural areas could potentially reduce global temperatures by overshooting 1.0 °C.

The reflective surfaces approach is similar to passive daytime radiative cooling (PDRC) in that they are both ground-based. Yet, PDRC focuses on "increasing the radiative heat emission from the Earth rather than merely decreasing its solar absorption."

== Types of reflective surfaces ==
=== Cool roofs ===
Heat from the sun is one of the most potent factors that affect roof durability. High temperatures and temperature variations reduce the longevity of roofing materials. Reducing the extremes of temperature change reduce the damage. Covering roofs with materials that reflect ultraviolet and infrared radiation reduce damage.

White surfaces reflect more than half of the radiation that reaches them, while black surfaces absorb almost all. In 2026, researchers introduced a paint that reflects 93% of sunlight (commercial white paint reflects 84%). This paint can emit more heat (from other sources) than it absorbs from the sun.

==== Benefits ====
Cool roofs in hot climates can offer both immediate and long-term benefits, including:

- Savings of up to 15% of the annual air-conditioning energy use for a single-story building
- Help in mitigating the urban heat island effect
- Reduced air pollution and greenhouse gas emissions, as well as a significant offsetting of the warming impact of greenhouse gas emissions

Cool roofs achieve cooling energy savings in hot summers but can increase heating energy load during cold winters. Therefore, the net energy saving of cool roofs varies depending on climate. However, a 2010 energy efficiency study looking at this issue for air-conditioned commercial buildings across the United States found that the summer cooling savings typically outweigh the winter heating penalty even in cold climates near the Canada–United States border, giving savings in both electricity and emissions. Without a proper maintenance program to keep the material clean, the energy savings of cool roofs can diminish over time due to albedo degradation and soiling.

A modelling study of the impacts of reductions in temperature due to cool roofs in London during the 2018 British Isles heatwave found that heat-related mortality in this period (estimated 655 – 920) could have been reduced by 249 (32%) in scenarios where all buildings are assumed to have cool roofs installed. Using the value of statistical life, the benefits in terms of avoided deaths for cool were estimated at a saving of £615 million.

A 2024 modeling study of two hot days in Greater London found that widespread deployment of cool roofs could reduce average outdoor air temperatures by approximately 1.2°C.

If all urban, flat roofs in warm climates were whitened, the resulting 10% increase in global reflectivity would offset the warming effect of 24 gigatonnes of greenhouse gas emissions, equivalent to taking 300 million cars off the road for 20 years. This is because a 93-square-metre (1,000 sq ft) white roof will offset 10 tons of carbon dioxide over its 20-year lifetime. In a real-world 2008 case study of large-scale cooling from increased reflectivity, it was found that the Province of Almeria, Southern Spain, has cooled 1.6 °C (2.9 °F) over a period of 20 years compared to surrounding regions, as a result of polythene-covered greenhouses being installed over a vast area that was previously open desert. In the summer, the farmers whitewash these roofs to cool their plants down.

When sunlight falls on a white roof, much of it is reflected and passes back through the atmosphere into space. But when sunlight falls on a dark roof, most of the light is absorbed and re-radiated as much longer wavelengths, which are absorbed by the atmosphere. (The gases in the atmosphere that most strongly absorb these long wavelengths have been termed "greenhouse gases"). Findings of a study conducted by Syed Ahmad Farhan et al. from Universiti Teknologi PETRONAS and Universiti Teknologi MARA in 2021, which is based on the hot and humid climate of Malaysia, suggest that the selection of white roof tiles significantly reduces the peaks of heat conduction transfer and roof-top surface temperature as well as the values of heat conduction transfer and roof-top surface temperature throughout diurnal profiles. Contrarily, the results also reveal that it does not influence the nocturnal profiles, as a release of heat to the sky takes place throughout the night. The release of heat from the building occurs due to the absence of solar radiation, which reduces the sky temperature and enables the sky to act as a heat sink that promotes the transfer of heat from the building to the sky to achieve thermal equilibrium.

A 2012 study by researchers at Concordia University included variables similar to those used in the Stanford study (e.g., cloud responses) and estimated that worldwide deployment of cool roofs and pavements in cities would generate a global cooling effect equivalent to offsetting up to 150 gigatonnes of carbon dioxide emissions— enough to take every car in the world off the road for 50 years.

==== Types ====
Albedo of some roof types: (1) Tar & gravel 0,03-0,18; (2) Corrugated roof 0,10-0,15; (3) Red / brown tile roof 0,10-0,35; (4) Colored paint 0,15-0,35; (5) Grass roof 0,30-0,50; (6) White paint 0,50-0,90; (7) Highly reflective roof 0,60-0,70

White thermoplastic membrane roofs (PVC and TPO) are inherently reflective, achieving some of the highest reflectance and emittance measurements of which roofing materials are capable. A roof made of white thermoplastic, for example, can reflect 80% or more of the sun's rays and emit at least 70% of the solar radiation that the roof absorbs. An asphalt roof only reflects between 6 and 26% of solar radiation.

In addition to the white thermoplastic PVC and TPO membranes used in many commercial cool roof applications, there is also research in the field of cool asphalt shingles. Asphalt shingles make up the majority of the North American residential roofing market, and consumer preferences for darker colors make creating solar-reflective shingles a particular challenge, causing asphalt shingles to have solar reflectances of only 4–26%. When these roofs are designed to reflect an increased amount of solar radiation, the urban heat island effect can be reduced through the reduced need for cooling costs in the summer. Though a more reflective roof can lead to higher heating costs in the colder months, studies have shown that the increased winter heating costs are still lower than the summer cooling cost savings. To satisfy the consumer demands for darker colors which still reflect significant amounts of sunlight, different materials, coating processes, and pigments are used. Since only 43% of light occurs in the visible light spectrum, reflectance can be improved without affecting color by increasing the reflectance of UV and IR light. High surface roughness can also contribute to the low solar reflectances of asphalt shingles, as these shingles are made of many small approximately spherical granules which have a high surface roughness. To decrease this, other granule materials are being investigated, such as flat rock flakes, which could reduce the reflectance inefficiencies due to surface roughness. Another alternative is to coat the granules using a dual coat process: the outer coating would have the desired color pigment, though it may not be very reflective, while the inner coating is a highly reflective titanium dioxide coating.

Natural white gravel covering can be seen as an alternative option to obtain cool roofing and cool pavements.

The highest SRI rating and the coolest roofs are stainless steel roofs, which are just several degrees above ambient under medium wind conditions. Their SRIs range from 100 to 115. Some are also hydrophobic, so they stay clean and maintain their original SRI even in polluted environments. [A]

===== Coated roofs =====
An existing (or new) roof can be made reflective by applying a solar reflective coating to its surface. The reflectivity and emissivity ratings for over 500 reflective coatings can be found in the Cool Roofs Rating Council. In a 2025 study in Singapore, researchers found that the surface of a concrete roof with a reflective coating was up to 22 °C cooler than the surface of an uncoated roof.

===== Blue and red roofs =====
Researchers at the Lawrence Berkeley National Laboratory have determined that a pigment used by the ancient Egyptians known as "Egyptian blue" absorbs visible light and emits light in the near-infrared range. It may be useful in construction materials to keep roofs and walls cool.

They have also developed fluorescent ruby red coatings, which have reflective properties similar to white roofs.

===== Green roofs =====
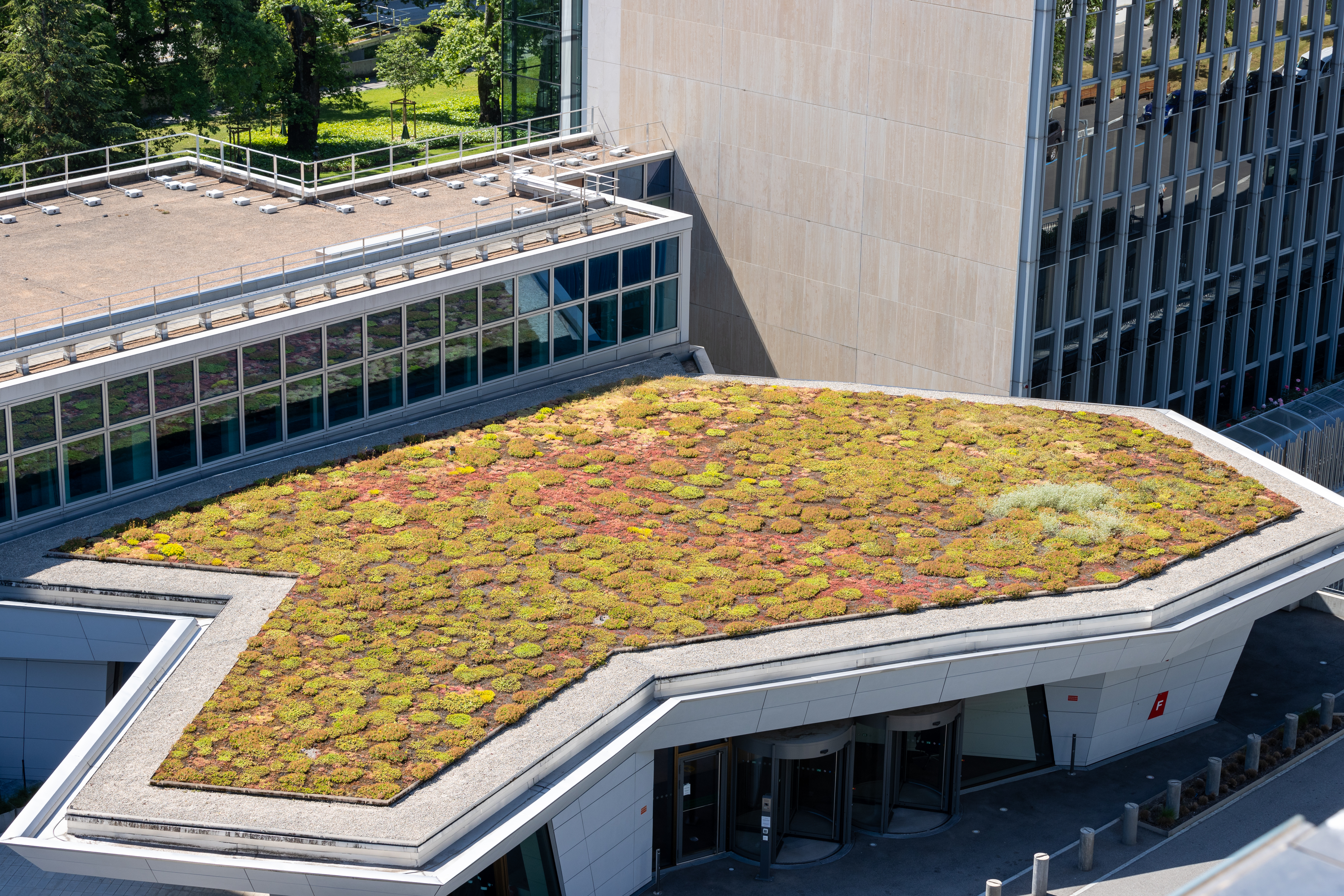
Green Roof at WIPO Headquarters in Geneva, Switzerland

Green roofs provide a thermal mass layer, which helps reduce the flow of heat into a building. The solar reflectance of green roofs varies depending on the plant types (generally 0.3–0.5). Green roofs may not reflect as much as a cool roof but do have other benefits such as evapotranspiration which cools the plants and the immediate area around the plants, aiding in lowering rooftop temperatures but increasing humidity, naturally. Moreover, some Green roofs need maintenance, such as regular watering.

==== Disadvantages ====
A 2011 study by researchers at Stanford University suggested that although reflective roofs decrease temperatures in buildings and mitigate the "urban heat island effect", they may increase global temperature. The study noted that it did not account for the reduction in greenhouse gas emissions that results from building energy conservation (annual cooling energy savings less annual heating energy penalty) associated with cool roofs (meaning that one will need to use more energy to heat the living space due to reduction in heat from sunlight in winter.) However, this applies only to those areas with low winter temperatures – not tropical climates. Also, homes in areas receiving snow in winter months are unlikely to receive significantly more heat from darker roofs, as they will be snow-covered most of the winter. A response paper titled "Cool Roofs and Global Cooling," by researchers in the Heat Island Group at Lawrence Berkeley National Laboratory, raised additional concerns about the validity of these findings, citing the uncertainty acknowledged by the authors, statistically insignificant numerical results, and insufficient granularity in analysis of local contributions to global feedbacks.

Also, 2012 research at University of California, San Diego's Jacobs School of Engineering into the interaction between reflective pavements and buildings found that, unless the nearby buildings are fitted with reflective glass or other mitigation factors, solar radiation reflected off light-colored pavements can increase the temperature in nearby buildings, increasing air conditioning demands and energy usage.

In 2014, a team of researchers led by Matei Georgescu, an assistant professor in Arizona State University's School of Geographical Sciences and Urban Planning and a senior sustainability scientist in the Global Institute of Sustainability, explored the relative effectiveness of some of the most common adaptation technologies aimed at reducing warming from urban expansion. Results of the study indicate that the performance of urban adaptation technologies can counteract this increase in temperature, but also varies seasonally and is geographically dependent.

Specifically, what works in California's Central Valley, such as cool roofs, does not necessarily provide the same benefits to other regions of the country, like Florida. Assessing consequences that extend beyond near-surface temperatures, such as rainfall and energy demand, reveals important trade-offs that are often unaccounted for. Cool roofs are particularly effective for certain areas during summertime. However, during winter, these same urban adaptation strategies, when deployed in northerly locations, further cool the environment and consequently require additional heating to maintain comfort levels. "The energy savings gained during the summer season, for some regions, is nearly entirely lost during the winter season," Georgescu said. In Florida, and to a lesser extent, southwestern states, there is a very different effect caused by cool roofs. "In Florida, our simulations indicate a significant reduction in precipitation," he said. "The deployment of cool roofs results in a 2 to 4 millimeter per day reduction in rainfall, a considerable amount (nearly 50 percent) that will have implications for water availability, reduced stream flow, and negative consequences for ecosystems. For Florida, cool roofs may not be the optimal way to battle the urban heat island because of these unintended consequences." Overall, the researchers suggest that judicious planning and design choices should be considered in trying to counteract rising temperatures caused by urban sprawl and greenhouse gases. They add that "urban-induced climate change depends on specific geographic factors that must be assessed when choosing optimal approaches, as opposed to one-size-fits-all solutions."

A series of Advanced Energy Design Guides were developed in cooperation with ASHRAE (American Society of Heating, Refrigerating and Air-Conditioning Engineers), AIA (The American Institute of Architects), IESNA (Illuminating Engineering Society of North America), USGBC (United States Green Building Council) and US DOE (United States Department of Energy) in 2011. These guides were aimed at achieving 50% Energy Savings Toward a Net zero-energy building. They covered the building types of Small to Medium Office Buildings, Medium to Big Box Retail Buildings, Large Hospitals, and K-12 School Buildings. In Climate Zones 4 and above, the recommendation is to follow the ASHRAE 90.1 standard for roof reflectance, which does not require roofs to be reflective in these zones. In Climate Zones 4 and above, Cool Roofs are not a recommended Design Strategy.

A series of Advanced Energy Retrofit Guides for "Practical Ways to Improve Energy Performance" were developed in cooperation with the US DOE (United States Department of Energy) and PNNL (Pacific Northwest National Laboratory) in 2011. These guides were aimed at improvements to existing Retail and Office buildings, which could improve their energy efficiency. Cool roofs were not recommended for all locations. "This measure is likely more cost-effective in the hot and humid climate zone, which has a long cooling season, than in the very cold climate zone, for example. For buildings located in warm climates, this measure is worth consideration."

The Copper Development Association has conducted several studies, beginning in 2002, which examined the elevated temperatures of wiring inside conduits at and above various color roof materials. The findings concluded that the temperatures above cool roofs were higher than those of a darker-colored roof material. This illustrates the idea that deflected solar radiation, when impeded by rooftop equipment, piping, or other materials, will be subjected to the heat gain of the radiation.

According to the US DOE's "Guidelines for Selecting Cool Roofs": "Cool roofs must be considered in the context of your surroundings. It is relatively easy to specify a cool roof and predict energy savings, but some thinking ahead can prevent other headaches. Ask this question before installing a cool roof: Where will the reflected sunlight go? A bright, reflective roof could reflect light and heat into the higher windows of taller neighboring buildings. In sunny conditions, this could cause uncomfortable glare and unwanted heat for you or your neighbors. Excess heat caused by reflections increases air conditioning energy use, negating some of the energy saving benefits of the cool roof."

According to the US DOE's "Guidelines for Selecting Cool Roofs" on the subject of cool roof maintenance: "As a cool roof becomes dirty from pollution, foot traffic, wind-deposited debris, ponded water, and mold or algae growth, its reflectance will decrease, leading to higher temperatures. Especially dirty roofs may perform substantially worse than product labels indicate. Dirt from foot traffic may be minimized by specifying designated walkways or by limiting access to the roof. Steep-sloped roofs have less of a problem with dirt accumulation because rainwater can more easily wash away dirt and debris. Some cool roof surfaces are "self-cleaning" which means they shed dirt more easily and may better retain their reflectance. Cleaning a cool roof can restore solar reflectance close to its installed condition. Always check with your roof manufacturer for the proper cleaning procedure, as some methods may damage your roof. While it is generally not cost-effective to clean a roof just for the energy savings, roof cleaning can be integrated as one component of your roof's routine maintenance program. It is, therefore, best to estimate energy savings based on weathered solar reflectance values rather than clean roof values."

==== Properties ====
When the sunlight strikes a dark rooftop, about 15% of it gets reflected into the sky, but most of its energy is absorbed into the roof system in the form of heat. Cool roofs reflect significantly more sunlight and absorb less heat than traditional dark-colored roofs.

Two properties are used to measure the effects of cool roofs:

- Solar reflectance, also known as albedo, is the ability to reflect sunlight. It is expressed either as a decimal fraction or a percentage. A value of 0 indicates that the surface absorbs all solar radiation, and a value of 1 (or 100%) represents total reflectivity.
- Thermal emittance is the ability for a material to radiate thermal energy as heat. It is also expressed either as a decimal fraction between 0 and 1 or a percentage.

Another method of evaluating coolness is the solar reflectance index (SRI), which incorporates both solar reflectance and emittance in a single value. SRI measures the roof's ability to reject solar heat, defined such that a standard black (reflectance 0.05, emittance 0.90) is 0 and a standard white (reflectance 0.80, emittance 0.90) is 100.

A perfect SRI is approximately 122. Such a material would reflect all sunlight (not absorb) and have very high emissivity (emissivity of 1.0). High-reflectivity, low-emissivity roofs maintain a temperature very close to ambient at all times, preventing heat gains in hot climates and minimizing heat loss in cold climates. High emissivity roofs have much higher heat loss in cold climates for the same insulation values.

==== Roof Savings Calculator ====
The Roof Savings Calculator (RSC) is a tool developed by the U.S. Department of Energy's Oak Ridge National Laboratory, which estimates cooling and heating savings for low-slope roof applications with white and black surfaces.

This tool was the collaboration of both Oak Ridge National Laboratory and Lawrence Berkeley National Laboratory in order to provide industry-consensus roof savings for both residential and commercial buildings. It reports the net annual energy savings (cooling energy savings minus heating penalties) and thus is only applicable to the buildings with a heating and/or cooling system.

=== Cars ===
Solar reflective cars or cool cars reflect more sunlight than dark cars, reducing the amount of heat that is transmitted into the car's interior. Therefore, it helps decrease the need for air conditioning, fuel consumption, and emissions of greenhouse gases and urban air pollutants.

=== Cool pavements ===
Cool color parking lots are parking lots made with a reflective layer of paint. Cool pavements which are designed to reflect solar radiation may use modified mixes, reflective coatings, permeable pavements, and vegetated pavements.

=== Mirrors ===
Mirrors are being explored as a reflective surface to reflect solar radiation and cool temperatures. MEER is a nonprofit proposing the use of recycled materials to manufacture mirrors and polymer reflective films for potential widespread use on rooftops and in open spaces such as farmland. Trials have been undertaken in California and further application opportunities are developing in New Hampshire, India, and Africa.

=== Specific thermal emitters ===
Some papers have proposed the deployment of specific thermal emitters (whether via advanced paint, or printed rolls of material) which would simultaneously reflect sunlight and also emit energy at longwave infrared (LWIR) lengths of 8–20 μm, which is too short to be trapped by the greenhouse effect and would radiate into outer space. It has been suggested that to stabilize Earth's energy budget and thus cease warming, 1–2% of the Earth's surface (area equivalent to over half of Sahara) would need to be covered with these emitters, at the deployment cost of $1.25–2.5 trillion. While low next to the estimated $20 trillion saved by limiting the warming to 1.5 °C (2.7 °F) rather than 2 °C (3.6 °F), it does not include any maintenance costs.

== Climatic variables ==
In some climates where there are more heating days than cooling days, white reflective roofs may not be effective in terms of energy efficiency or savings because the savings on cooling energy use can be outweighed by heating penalties during winter. According to the U.S. Energy Information Administration, 2003 Commercial Buildings Energy Consumption Survey, heating accounts for 36% of commercial buildings' annual energy consumption, while air conditioning only accounts for 8% in United States. Energy calculators generally show a yearly net savings for dark-colored roof systems in cool climates.

A perfect roof would absorb no heat in the summer and lose no heat in the winter. To do this it would need a very high SRI to eliminate all radiative heat gains in summer and losses in winter. High SRI roofs act as a radiant barrier, providing a thermos-bottle effect. High emissivity cool roofs carry a climate penalty due to winter radiative heat losses, which reflective bare metal roofs, such as stainless steel, do not.

== Applications ==
In a 2001 federal study, the Lawrence Berkeley National Laboratory (LBNL) measured and calculated the reduction in peak energy demand associated with a cool roof's surface reflectance. LBNL found that, compared to the original black rubber roofing membrane on the Texas retail building studied, a retrofitted vinyl membrane delivered an average decrease of 24 °C (43 °F) in surface temperature, an 11% decrease in aggregate air conditioning energy consumption, and a corresponding 14% drop in peak hour demand. The average daily summertime temperature of the black roof surface was 75 °C (167 °F), but once retrofitted with a white reflective surface, it measured 52 °C (126 °F). Without considering any tax benefits or other utility charges, annual energy expenditures were reduced by $7,200 or $0.07/square foot.(This figure is for energy charges as well as peak demand charges).

Instruments measured weather conditions on the roof, temperatures inside the building and throughout the roof layers, and air conditioning and total building power consumption. Measurements were taken with the original black rubber roofing membrane and then after replacement with a white vinyl roof with the same insulation and HVAC systems in place.

Though a full year of actual data was collected, due to aberrations in the data, one month of data was excluded along with several other days which didn't meet the parameters of the study. Only 36 continuous pre-retrofit days were used and only 28 non-continuous operating days were used for the post-retrofit period.

Another case study, conducted in 2009 and published in 2011, was completed by Ashley-McGraw Architects and CDH Energy Corp for Onondaga County Dept. of Corrections, in Jamesville, New York, evaluated energy performance of a green or vegetative roof, a dark EPDM roof and a white reflective TPO roof. The measured results showed that the TPO and vegetative roof systems had much lower roof temperatures than the conventional EPDM surface. The reduction in solar absorption reduced solar gains in the summer but also increased heat losses during the heating season. Compared to the EPDM membrane, the TPO roof had 30% higher heating losses and the vegetative roof had 23% higher losses.

=== Promotional programs ===
==== Across the U.S. federal government ====
In July 2010, the United States Department of Energy announced a series of initiatives to more broadly implement cool roof technologies on DOE facilities and buildings across the country. As part of the new efforts, DOE will install a cool roof, whenever cost-effective over the lifetime of the roof, during construction of a new roof or the replacement of an old one at a DOE facility.

In October 2013, the United States Department of Energy ranked Cool Roofs as a 53 out of 100 (0 to 100 weighted average) for a cost-effective energy strategy. "Climate issues can affect cool roof performance. Cool roofs are more beneficial in warmer climates and may cause energy consumption for heating applications to rise in colder climates. Cool roofs have a lower impact the more insulation is used. The Secretary of Energy directed all U.S. Department of Energy (DOE) offices to install cool roofs, when life-cycle cost-effectiveness is demonstrated, when constructing new roofs, or when replacing old roofs at DOE facilities. Other Federal agencies were also encouraged to do the same."

==== Energy Star ====
Energy Star is a joint program of the U.S. Environmental Protection Agency and the U.S. Department of Energy designed to reduce greenhouse gas emissions and help businesses and consumers save money by making energy-efficient product choices.

For low-slope roof applications, a roof product qualifying for the Energy Star label under its Roof Products Program must have an initial solar reflectivity of at least 0.65, and weathered reflectance of at least 0.50, in accordance with EPA testing procedures. Warranties for reflective roof products must be equal in all material respects to warranties offered for comparable non-reflective roof products, either by a given company or relative to industry standards.

Unlike other Energy Star-rated products, such as appliances, this rating system does not look at the entire roof assembly, but only the exterior surface. Consumers (i.e. building owners) may believe that the Energy Star label means their roof is energy-efficient; however, the testing is not as stringent as their appliance standard and does not include the additional components of a roof (i.e. roof structure, fire rated barriers, insulation, adhesives, fasteners, etc.). A disclaimer is posted on their website "Although there are inherent benefits in the use of reflective roofing, before selecting a roofing product based on expected energy savings consumers should explore the expected calculated results that can be found on the Department of Energy's "Roof Savings Calculator" website at www.roofcalc.com. Please remember the Energy Savings that can be achieved with reflective roofing is highly dependent on facility design, insulation used, climatic conditions, building location, and building envelope efficiency."

Certification requirements for different cool roof programs
Slope	Min. solar reflectance	Min. emittance	Min. solar reflectance index
ENERGY STAR
Low, initial	0.65		
Low, aged	0.50		
Steep, initial	0.25		
Steep, aged	0.15		
Green Globes
Low slope			78
Steep slope			29
USGBC LEED
Low slope			78
Steep slope			29

==== Cool Roof Rating Council ====
Cool Roof Rating Council (CRRC) has created a rating system for measuring and reporting the solar reflectance and thermal emittance of roofing products. This system has been put into an online directory of more than 850 roofing products and is available for energy service providers, building code bodies, architects and specifiers, property owners and community planners. CRRC conducts random testing each year to ensure the credibility of its rating directory.

CRRC's rating program allows manufacturers and sellers to appropriately label their roofing products according to specific CRRC measured properties. The program does not, however, specify minimum requirements for solar reflectance or thermal emittance.

==== Green Globes ====
The Green Globes system is used in Canada and the United States. In the U.S., Green Globes is owned and operated by the Green Building Initiative (GBI). In Canada, the version for existing buildings is owned and operated by BOMA Canada under the brand name 'Go Green' (Visez vert).

Green Globe uses performance benchmark criteria to evaluate a building's likely energy consumption, comparing the building design against data generated by the EPA's Target Finder, which reflects real building performance. Buildings may earn a rating of between one and four globes. This is an online system; a building's information is verified by a Green Globes-approved and trained licensed engineer or architect. To qualify for a rating, roofing materials must have a solar reflectance of at least 0.65 and thermal emittance of at least 0.90. As many as 10 points may be awarded for 1–100 percent roof coverage with either vegetation or highly reflective materials or both. The basis in physics of a high emittance is quite questionable, since it merely describes a material which easily radiates infrared wavelength heat to the environment, contributing to the greenhouse effect. Highly reflective, low-emittance materials are much better at reducing energy consumption.

==== LEED ====
The U.S. Green Building Council's Leadership in Energy and Environmental Design (LEED) rating system is a voluntary, continuously evolving national standard for developing high performance sustainable buildings. LEED provides standards for choosing products in designing buildings, but does not certify products.

Unlike a building code, such as the International Building Code, only members of the USGBC and specific "in-house" committees may add, subtract or edit the standard, based on an internal review process. Model Building Codes are voted on by members and "in-house" committees, but allow for comments and testimony from the general public during each and every code development cycle at Public Review hearings, generally held multiple times a year.

Under the LEED 2009 version, to receive Sustainable Sites Credit 7.2 Heat Island Effect-Roof, at least 75% of the surface of a roof must use materials having a solar reflective index (SRI) of at least 78. This criterion can also be met by installing a vegetated roof for at least 50% of the roof area, or installing a high albedo and vegetated roof in combination that meets this formula: (Area of Roof meeting Minimum SRI Roof/0.75) + (Area of vegetated roof/0.5) ≥ Total Roof Area.

Examples of LEED-certified buildings with white reflective roofs are below.

Building name	Owner	Location	LEED level
Wildomar Service Center	Southern California Edison	Wildomar, California	Platinum
Donald Bren School of Environmental Science & Management	University of California, Santa Barbara	Santa Barbara, California	Platinum
Frito-Lay Jim Rich Service Center	Frito-Lay, Inc.	Rochester, New York	Gold
Edifice Multifunction	Travaux Public et Services Gouvernementaux Canada	Montreal, Quebec	Gold
Seattle Central Library	City of Seattle	Seattle, Washington	Silver
National Geographic Society Headquarters Complex	National Geographic Society	Washington, D.C.	Silver
Utah Olympic Oval	Salt Lake City Olympic Winter Games 2002 Organizing Committee	Salt Lake City, Utah	Certified
Premier Automotive Group North American Headquarters	Ford Motor Company	Irvine, California	Certified

==== Cool Roofs Europe and other countries ====
This project is co-financed by the European Union in the framework of the Intelligent Energy Europe Programme.

The aim of the proposed action is to create and implement an Action Plan for the cool roofs in EU. The specific objectives are: to support policy development by transferring experience and improving understanding of the actual and potential contributions by cool roofs to heating and cooling consumption in the EU; to remove and simplify the procedures for cool roofs integration in construction and building's stock; to change the behaviour of decision-makers and stakeholders so to improve acceptability of the cool roofs; to disseminate and promote the development of innovative legislation, codes, permits and standards, including application procedures, construction and planning permits concerning cool roofs. The work will be developed in four axes: technical, market, policy, and end-users.

In tropical Australia, zinc-galvanized (silvery) sheeting (usually corrugated) do not reflect heat as well as the truly "cool" color of white, especially as metallic surfaces fail to emit infrared back to the sky. European fashion trends are now using darker-colored aluminium roofing, to pursue consumer fashions.

==== NYC °CoolRoofs ====
NYC °CoolRoofs is a New York City initiative to coat rooftops white with volunteers. The program began in 2009 as part of PlaNYC, and has coated over 5 million square feet of NYC rooftops white. On Wednesday, September 25, 2013 Mayor Michael R. Bloomberg declared it "NYC °CoolRoofs Day" in New York City with the coating of its 500th building and reducing the carbon footprint by over 2000 tons. Volunteers use paintbrushes and rollers to apply an acrylic, elastomeric coating to the roof membrane. A 2011 Columbia University study of roofs coated through the program found that white roofs showed an average temperature reduction of 43 degrees Fahrenheit when compared to black roofs.

==== White Roof Project ====
White Roof Project is a U.S. nationwide initiative that educates and empowers individuals to coat rooftops white. The program's outreach has helped complete white roof projects in more than 20 US states and five countries, engaged thousands in volunteer projects, and sponsored the coating of hundreds of nonprofit and low-income rooftops.

== Urban heat island effect ==
An urban heat island occurs where the combination of heat-absorbing infrastructure such as dark asphalt parking lots and road pavement and expanses of black rooftops, coupled with sparse vegetation, raises air temperature by 1 to 3 °C (1.8 to 5.4 °F) higher than the temperature in the surrounding countryside.

Green building programs advocate the use of cool roofing to mitigate the urban heat island effect and the resulting poorer air quality (in the form of smog) the effect causes. By reflecting sunlight, light-colored roofs minimize the temperature rise and reduce cooling energy use and smog formation. A study by LBNL showed that, if strategies to mitigate this effect, including cool roofs, were widely adopted, the Greater Toronto Area could save more than $11 million annually on energy costs.

== See also ==
- Blue roof
- Building insulation
- Cool pavement
- Green roof
- Insulative paint
- Metal roof
- Passive cooling
- Passive daytime radiative cooling
- Passive solar building design
- Passive solar design
- Thermal insulation
- Weatherization
