= Passive daytime radiative cooling =

Management strategy for global warming

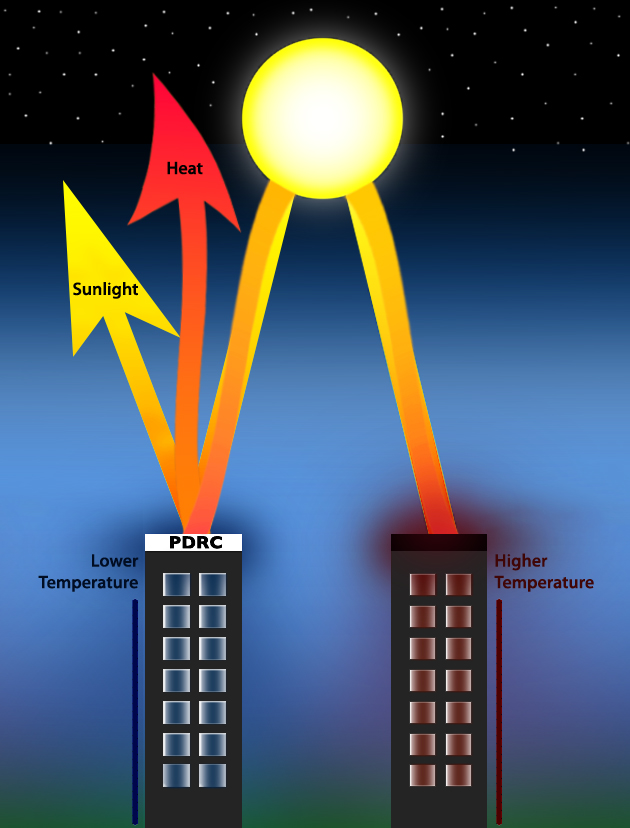
PDRC can lower temperatures with zero energy consumption or pollution by radiating heat into outer space. Widespread application has been proposed as a solution to global warming.

Passive daytime radiative cooling (PDRC)—also called passive radiative cooling, daytime passive radiative cooling, radiative sky cooling, photonic radiative cooling, and terrestrial radiative cooling—is the use of surfaces that are highly reflective and have high thermal emissivity to reduce the temperature of a building or other object.

It has been proposed as a method of reducing temperature increases caused by greenhouse gases by reducing the energy needed for air conditioning, reducing the urban heat island effect, and human body temperatures.

PDRC can aid systems that are more efficient at lower temperatures, such as photovoltaic systems, dew collection devices, and thermoelectric generators.

Some estimates propose that dedicating 1–2% of the Earth's surface area to PDRC would stabilize surface temperatures. Regional variations provide different cooling potentials with desert and temperate climates benefiting more than tropical climates, attributed to the effects of humidity and cloud cover. PDRC can be included in adaptive systems, switching from cooling to heating to mitigate any potential overcooling effects. PDRC applications for indoor space cooling is growing with an estimated "market size of ~$27 billion in 2025".

PDRC surfaces are designed to be high in solar reflectance to minimize heat gain and strong in longwave infrared (LWIR) thermal radiation heat transfer matching the atmosphere's infrared window (8–13 μm). This allows the heat to pass through the atmosphere into space.

PDRC leverages the natural process of radiative cooling, in which the Earth cools by releasing heat to space. PDRC operates during daytime. On a clear day, solar irradiance can reach 1000 W/m^{2} with a diffuse component between 50 and 100 W/m^{2}. The average PDRC has an estimated cooling power of ~100–150 W/m^{2}.

PDRC applications are deployed as sky-facing surfaces. Low-cost scalable PDRC materials with potential for mass production include coatings, thin films, metafabrics, aerogels, and biodegradable surfaces.

While typically white, other colors can also work, although generally offering less cooling potential.

Research, development, and interest in PDRC has grown rapidly since the 2010s, attributable to a breakthrough in 2014 in the use of photonic metamaterials to increase daytime cooling, along with growing concerns over energy use and global warming. PDRC can be contrasted with conventional compression-based cooling systems (e.g., air conditioners) that consume substantial amounts of energy, have a net heating effect (heating the outdoors more than cooling the indoors), require ready access to electric power and often employ coolants that deplete the ozone layer or have a strong greenhouse effect.

Unlike solar radiation management, PDRC increases heat emission beyond simple reflection.

== Implementation ==
A 2019 study reported that "widescale adoption of radiative cooling could reduce air temperature near the surface, if not the whole atmosphere". To address global warming, PDRC materials must be designed "to ensure that the emission is through the atmospheric transparency window and out to space, rather than just to the atmosphere, which would allow for local but not global cooling".

Currently the Earth is absorbing ~1 W/m^{2} more than it is emitting, which leads to an overall warming of the climate. By covering ... a small fraction [of the Earth with] thermally emitting materials, the heat flow away from the Earth can be increased, and the net radiative flux can be reduced to zero (or even made negative), thus stabilizing (or cooling) the Earth. ... If only 1%–2% of the Earth’s surface were instead made to radiate at [~100 W/m^{2}] rather than its current average value, the total heat fluxes into and away from the entire Earth would be balanced and warming would cease. ... To offset 1 W/m^{2} globally, we need approximately 5×10^{12} m^{2} of surface coverage with 100 W/m^{2} radiative emitters .... If used as one continuous area, it corresponds to a little more than half the size of the Sahara Desert. Ideally this area would be broken into several small regions globally (including roofs and other sky-facing surfaces).

— Jeremy Munday

Desert climates have the highest radiative cooling potential due to low year-round humidity and cloud cover, while tropical climates have less potential due to higher humidity and cloud cover. Costs for global implementation have been estimated at $1.25 to $2.5 trillion, or about 3% of annual gross world product (global GDP), with expected economies of scale. Low-cost scalable materials have been developed for widescale implementation, although some challenges toward commercialization remain.

Some studies recommended efforts to maximize solar reflectance, or albedo, of surfaces, with a goal of thermal emittance of 90%. For example, increasing reflectivity from 0.2 (typical rooftop) to 0.9 has a much greater effect than improving an already more reflective surface, such as from 0.9 to 0.97.

== Benefits ==
Studies have reported many PDRC benefits:

- Advancing toward a carbon-neutral future and achieving net-zero emissions.
- Alleviating electrical grids and renewable energy sources from devoting electric energy to cooling.
- Balancing the Earth's energy budget.
- Cooling human body temperatures during extreme heat.
- Improving atmospheric water collection systems and dew harvesting techniques.
- Improving performance of solar energy systems.
- Mitigating energy crises.
- Mitigating urban heat island effect.
- Reducing greenhouse gas emissions by replacing fossil fuel energy use devoted to cooling.
- Reducing local and global temperature increases associated with global warming.
- Reducing thermal pollution of water resources.
- Reducing water consumption for wet cooling processing.

== Other geoengineering approaches ==
PDRC has been claimed to be more stable, adaptable, and reversible than stratospheric aerosol injection (SAI).

Wang et al. claimed that SAI "might cause potentially dangerous threats to the Earth's basic climate operations" that may not be reversible, and thus preferred PDRC. Munday noted that although "unexpected effects will likely occur" with the global implementation of PDRC, that "these structures can be removed immediately if needed, unlike methods that involve dispersing particulate matter into the atmosphere, which can last for decades".

When compared to the reflective surfaces approach of increasing surface albedo, such as through painting roofs white, or the space mirror proposals of "deploying giant reflective surfaces in space", Munday claimed that "the increased reflectivity likely falls short of what is needed and comes at a high financial cost". PDRC differs from the reflective surfaces approach by "increasing the radiative heat emission from the Earth rather than merely decreasing its solar absorption".

== Function ==
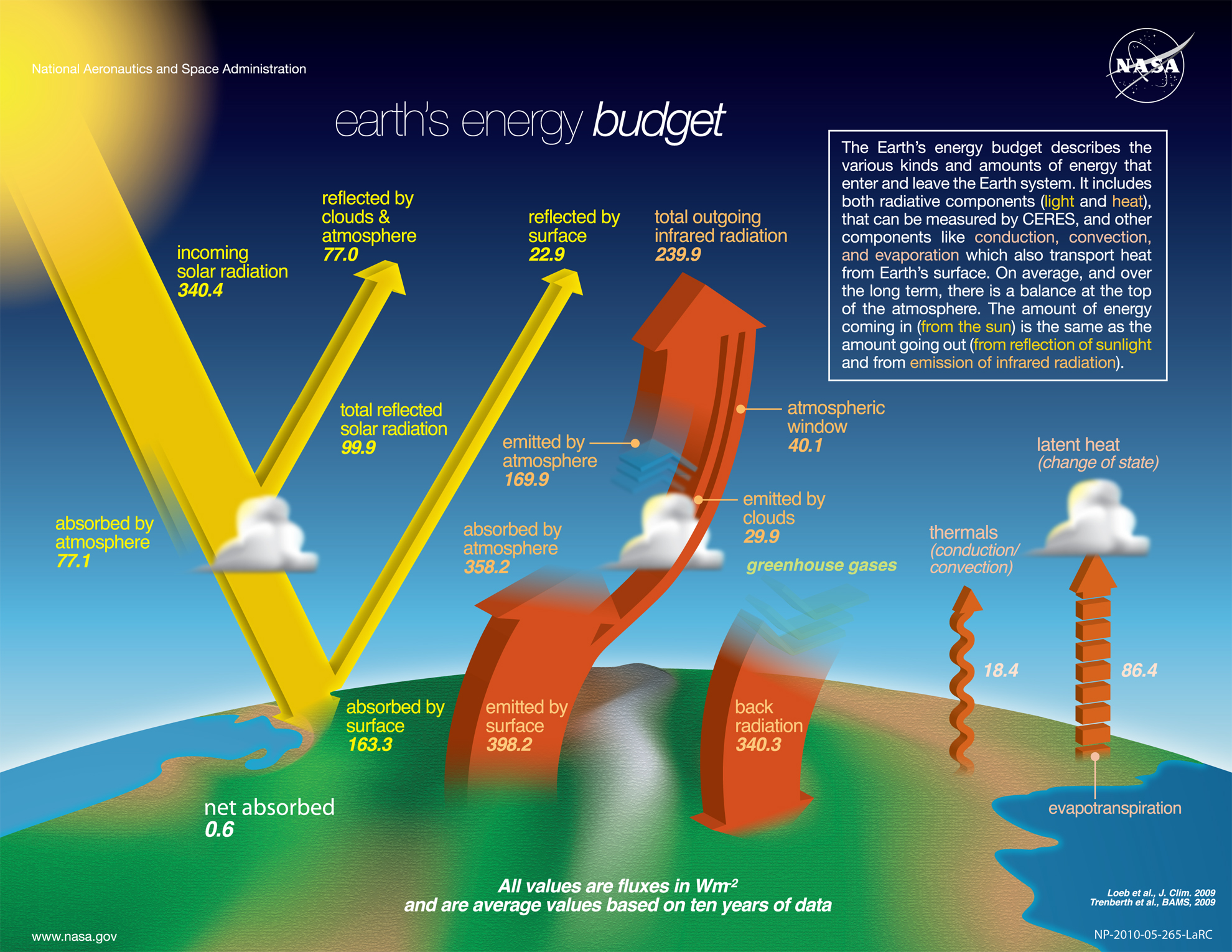
PDRC maximizes outgoing infrared radiation (shown in orange) and minimizes the absorption of solar radiation (shown in yellow).

The basic measure of PDRC is its solar reflectivity (in 0.4–2.5 μm) and heat emissivity (in 8–13 μm), to maximize "net emission of longwave thermal radiation" and minimize "absorption of downward shortwave radiation". PDRC uses the infrared window (8–13 μm) for heat transfer with the coldness of outer space (~2.7 K) to radiate heat and subsequently lower ambient temperatures passively, i.e. with zero energy input.

PDRC mimics the natural process of radiative cooling, in which the Earth cools itself by releasing heat to outer space (Earth's energy budget), although during the daytime lowering ambient temperatures under direct solar intensity. On a clear day, solar irradiance can reach 1000 W/m^{2} with a diffuse component between 50 and 100 W/m^{2}. As of 2022 the average PDRC had a cooling power of ~100–150 W/m^{2}. Cooling power is proportional to the installation's surface area.

=== Measuring effectiveness ===
The most useful measurements come in a real-world setting. Standardized devices have been proposed.

Evaluating atmospheric downward longwave radiation based on "the use of ambient weather conditions such as the surface air temperature and humidity instead of the altitude-dependent atmospheric profiles" may be problematic since "downward longwave radiation comes from various altitudes of the atmosphere with different temperatures, pressures, and water vapor contents" and "does not have uniform density, composition, and temperature across its thickness".

=== Broadband emitters (BE) vs. selective emitters (SE) ===
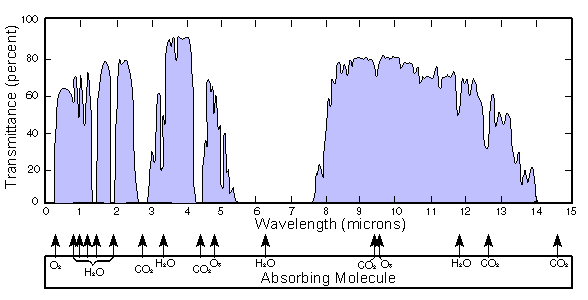
Broadband PDRC emitters emit in both the infrared window (8–14 μm) and the solar spectrum, while selective PDRC emitters only emit in the infrared window.

Broadband emitters exhibit high emittance in both the atmospheric LWIR window (8 to 14 μm) and the solar spectrum, whereas selective emitters only emit longwave infrared radiation.

In theory, selective thermal emitters can achieve higher cooling power. However, selective emitters face challenges in real-world applications that can weaken their performance, such as from dropwise condensation (common even in semi-arid climates) that can accumulate on even hydrophobic surfaces and reduce emission. Broadband emitters outperform selective materials when "the material is warmer than the ambient air, or when its sub-ambient surface temperature is within the range of several degrees".

Each type can be advantageous for certain applications. Broadband emitters may be better for horizontal applications, such as roofs, whereas selective emitters may be more useful on vertical surfaces such as building façades, where dropwise condensation is inconsequential and their stronger cooling power can be achieved.

Broadband emitters can be made angle-dependent to potentially enhance performance. Polydimethylsiloxane (PDMS) is a common broadband emitter. Most PDRC materials are broadband, primarily due to their lower cost and higher performance at above-ambient temperatures.

=== Hybrid systems ===
Combining PDRC with other systems may increase cooling power. When included in a system combining thermal insulation, evaporative cooling, and radiative cooling consisting of "a solar reflector, a water-rich and IR-emitting evaporative layer, and a vapor-permeable, IR-transparent, and solar-reflecting insulation layer", cooling power was quadruple that of "a state-of-the-art radiative cooler". This could extend the shelf life of food by 40% in humid climates, and more than triple it in dry climates, without refrigeration. The system, however, requires water to maintain cooling power.

A dual-mode asymmetric photonic mirror (APM) consisting of silicon-based diffractive gratings could achieve all-season cooling, even under cloudy and humid conditions, as well as heating. The cooling power of an APM can exceed that of standalone radiative coolers by more than 80%. Under cloudy sky, it could achieve 8 °C more cooling and, for heating, 5.7 °C.

== Climatic variations ==
The cooling potential of various areas varies primarily based on climate zones, weather patterns, and events. Dry and hot regions generally have higher radiative cooling power (up to 120 W/m^{2}), while colder regions and those with high humidity or cloud cover generally have less. Cooling potential changes seasonally due to shifts in humidity and cloud cover. Studies mapping daytime radiative cooling potential have been done for China, India, and the United States and across Europe.

=== Deserts ===
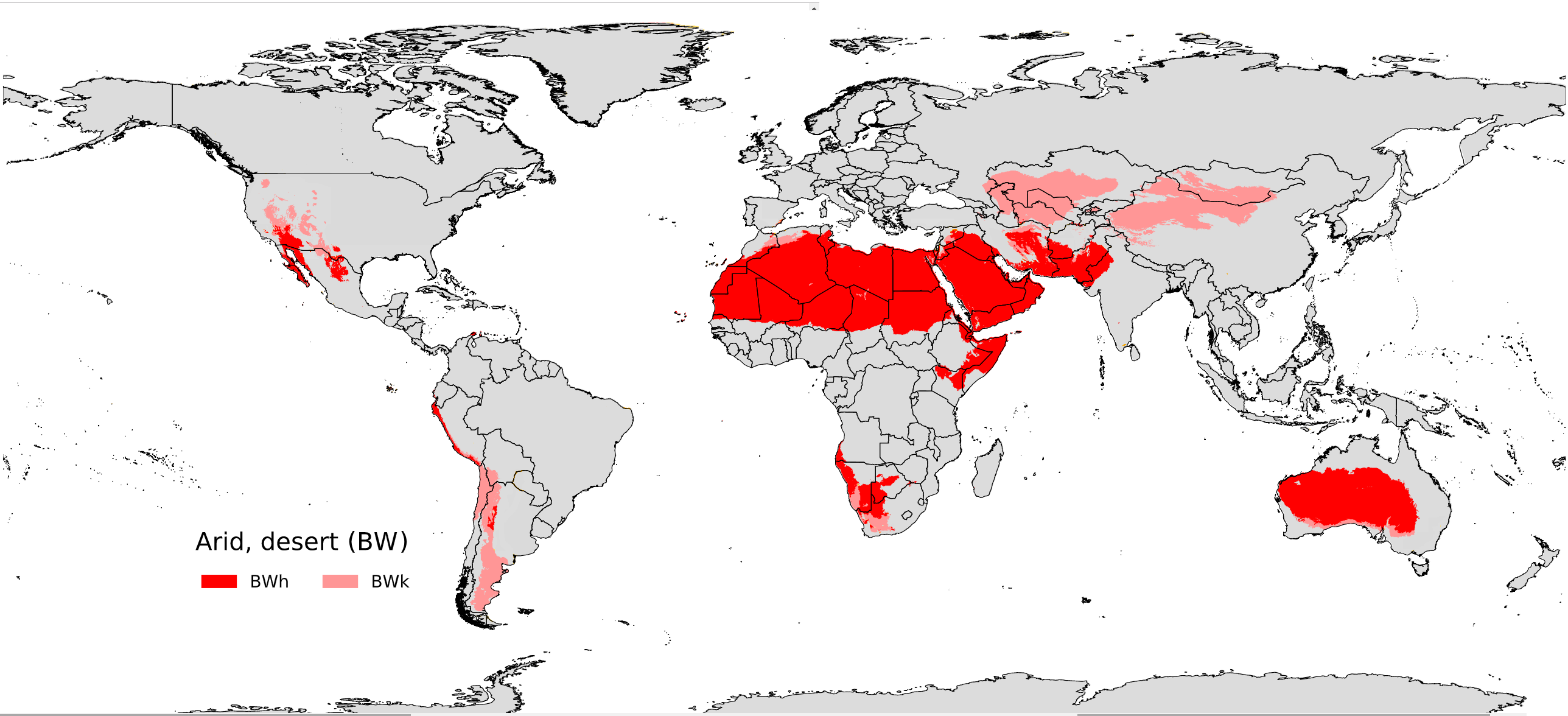
Desert climates have the highest radiative cooling potential due to low humidity and cloud cover.

Dry regions such as western Asia, north Africa, Australia and the southwestern United States are ideal for PDRC due to the relative lack of humidity and cloud cover across the seasons. The cooling potential for desert regions has been estimated as "in the higher range of 80–110 W/m^{2}" and as 120 W/m^{2}. The Sahara Desert and western Asia is the largest area on earth with such a high cooling potential.

The cooling potential of desert regions is likely to remain relatively unfulfilled due to low population densities, reducing demand for local cooling, despite tremendous cooling potential.

=== Temperate climates ===
Temperate climates have moderate to high radiative cooling potentials.

Temperate climates have moderate to high radiative cooling potential and greater population density, which may increase interest in PDRC. These zones tend to be transitional zones between dry and humid climates. High-population areas in temperate zones may be susceptible to an overcooling effect from PDRC due to temperature shifts from summer to winter, which can be overcome with modifications.

=== Tropics ===
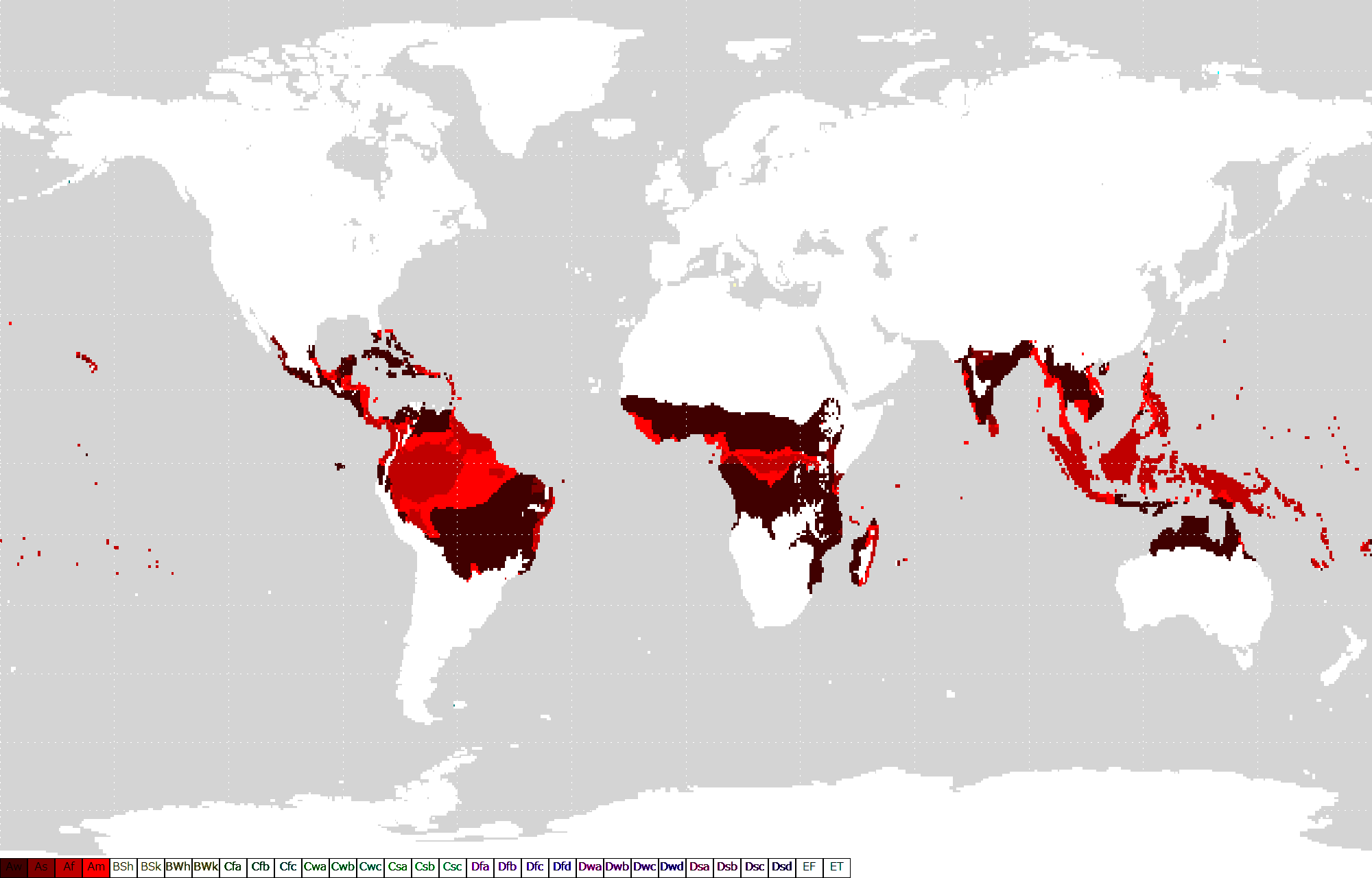
Tropical climates have a lower radiative cooling potential due to high humidity and cloud cover.

While PDRC has proven successful in temperate regions, reaching the same level of performance is more difficult in tropical climes. This has primarily been attributed to the higher solar irradiance and atmospheric radiation. The average cooling potential of tropical climates varies between 10 and 40 W/m^{2}, significantly lower than hot and dry climates.

For example, the cooling potential of most of southeast Asia and the Indian subcontinent is significantly diminished in the summer due to a dramatic increase in humidity, dropping as low as 10–30 W/m^{2}. Other similar zones, such as tropical savannah areas in Africa, see a more modest decline during summer, dropping to 20–40 W/m^{2}. However, tropical regions generally have a higher albedo, or radiative forcing, due to sustained cloud cover and thus their land surface contributes less to planetary albedo.

A 2022 study reported that a PDRC surface in tropical climates should have a solar reflectance of at least 97% and an infrared emittance of at least 80% to reduce temperatures. The study applied a BaSO_{4}–K_{2}SO_{4} coating with a "solar reflectance and infrared emittance (8–13 μm) of 98.4% and 95% respectively" in the tropical climate of Singapore and achieved a sustained daytime temperature 2 °C below ambient under direct solar intensity of 1000 W/m^{2}.

=== Variables ===
==== Humidity and cloud coverage ====
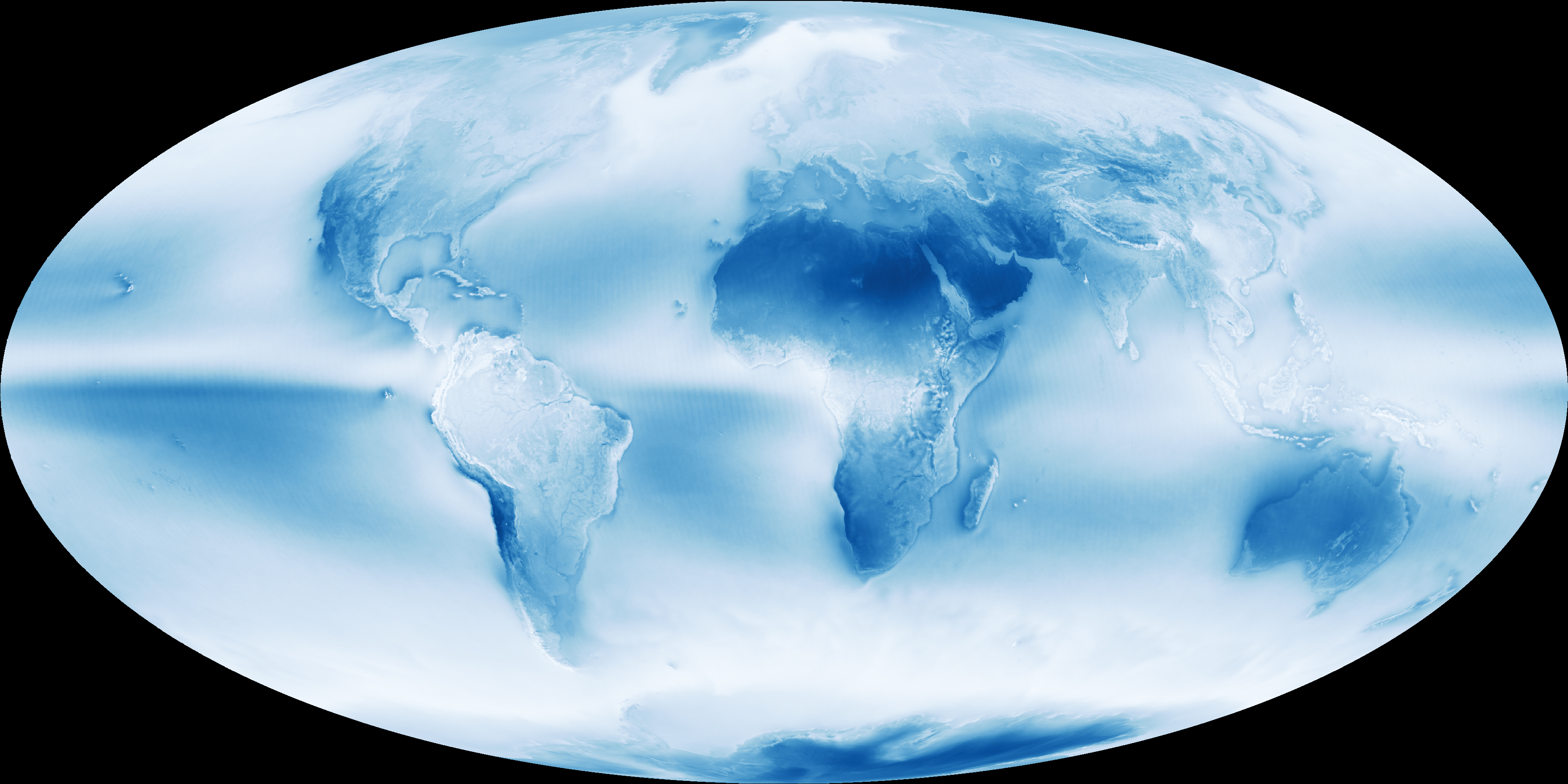
Global map of cloud cover. Data taken from 2002 to 2015. The darker the color, the clearer the sky.

Humidity and cloud coverage significantly weaken PDRC effectiveness. A 2022 study noted that "vertical variations of both vapor concentration and temperature in the atmosphere" can have a considerable impact on radiative coolers. The authors reported that aerosol and cloud coverage can weaken the effectiveness of radiators and thus concluded that adaptable "design strategies of radiative coolers" are needed to maximize effectiveness under these climatic conditions.

==== Dropwise condensation ====
The formation of dropwise condensation on PDRC surfaces can alter the infrared emittance of selective PDRC emitters, which can weaken their performance. Even in semi-arid environments dew can form. Another 2022 study reported that "dropwise condensation may broaden the narrowband emittances of [a] selective emitter and reduce their sub-ambient cooling power and their supposed cooling benefits over broadband emitters" and that:

Our work shows that the assumed benefits of selective emitters are even smaller when it comes to the largest application of radiative cooling – cooling roofs of buildings. However, recently, it has been shown that for vertical building facades experiencing broadband summertime terrestrial heat gains and wintertime losses, selective emitters can achieve seasonal thermoregulation and energy savings. Since dew formation appears less likely on vertical surfaces even in exceptionally humid environments, the thermoregulatory benefits of selective emitters will likely persist in both humid and dry operating conditions.

==== Rain ====
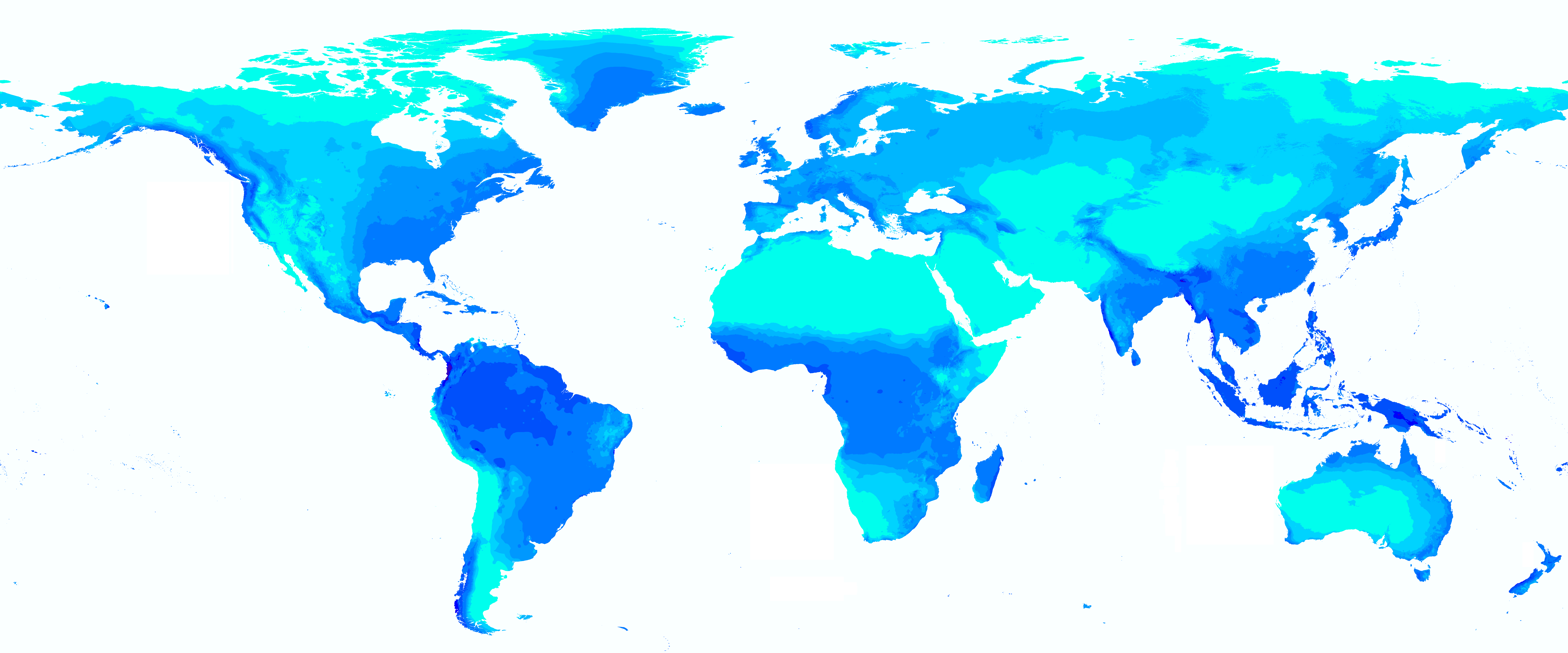
Global map of average annual precipitation. The darker the color, the higher the precipitation.

Rain can generally help clean PDRC surfaces covered with dust, dirt, or other debris. However, in humid areas, consistent rain can result in water accumulation that can hinder performance. Porous PDRC materials can mitigate these conditions. Another response is to make hydrophobic self-cleaning PDRC materials. Scalable and sustainable hydrophobic materials that avoid VOCs can repel rainwater and other liquids.

==== Wind ====
Wind may alter the efficiency of passive radiative cooling surfaces and technologies. A 2020 study proposed using a "tilt strategy and wind cover strategy" to mitigate wind effects. The researchers reported regional differences in China, noting that "85% of China's areas can achieve radiative cooling performance with wind cover" whereas in northwestern China wind cover effects would be more substantial. Bijarniya et al. similarly proposes the use of a wind shield in areas susceptible to high winds.

== Materials and production ==
PDRC surfaces can be made of various materials. However, for widespread application, PDRC materials must be inexpensive, available for mass production, and applicable in many contexts. Most research has focused on coatings and thin films, which tend to be more available for mass production, less expensive, and more applicable in a wider range of contexts, although other materials may provide potential for specific applications.

PDRC research has identified more sustainable material alternatives, even if not fully biodegradable. A 2023 study reported that "most PDRC materials now are [substances] which will cause excessive CO_{2} emissions by consuming fossil fuels and go against the global carbon neutrality goal. Environmentally friendly bio-based renewable materials should be [...] ideal [for] PDRC systems".

=== Multilayer and complex structures ===
Advanced photonic materials and structures, such as multilayer thin films, micro- and nanoparticles, photonic crystals, metamaterials, and metasurfaces, have been reported as potential approaches. However, while multilayer and complex nano-photonic structures have proven successful in experimental scenarios and simulations, a 2022 study reported that widespread application "is severely restricted because of the complex and expensive processes of preparation". Similarly, a 2020 study reported that "scalable production of artificial photonic radiators with complex structures, outstanding properties, high throughput, and low cost is still challenging". This has advanced research of simpler structures for PDRC materials possibly better suited for mass production.

=== Coatings ===
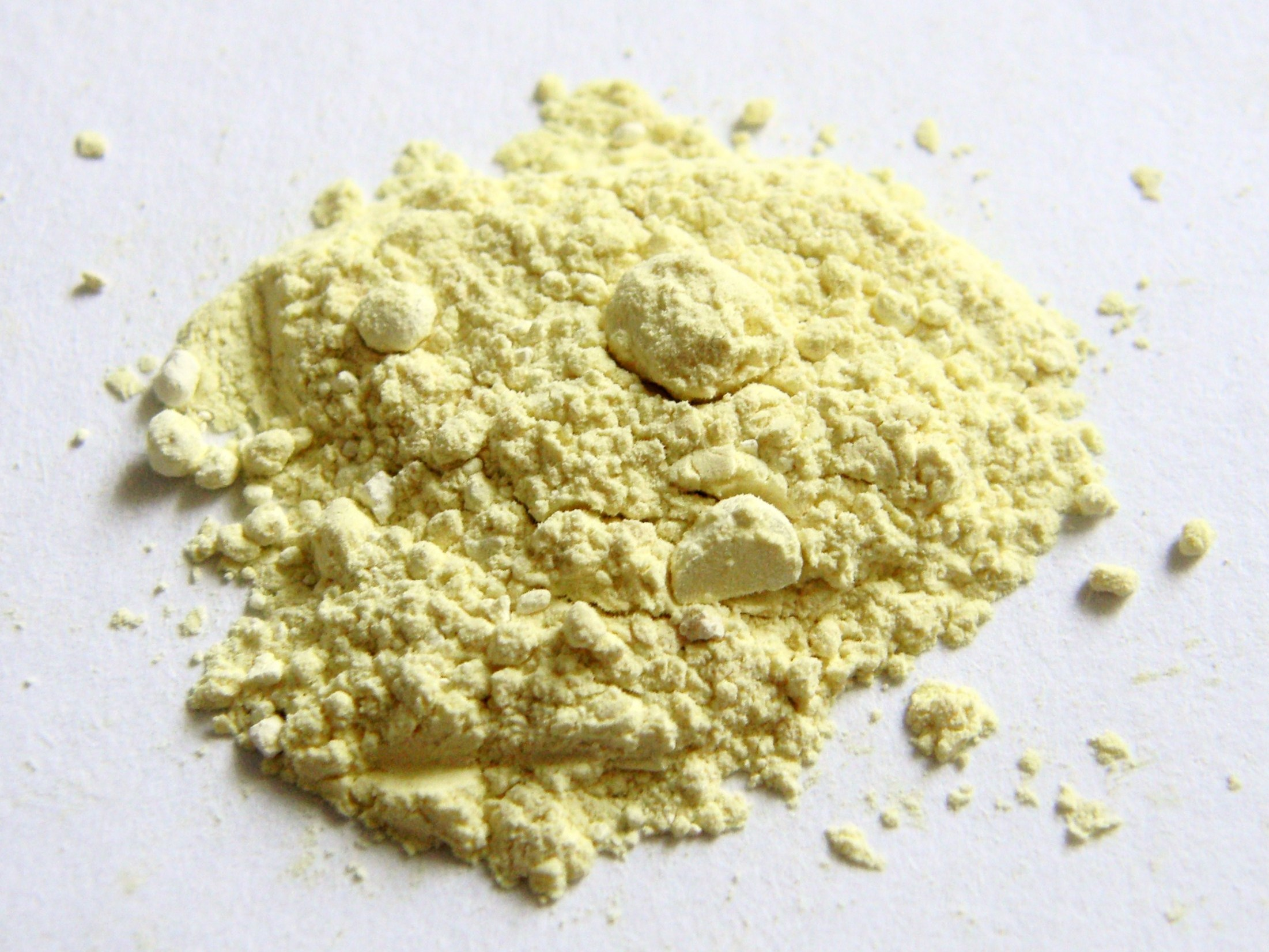
A scalable colored PDRC coating using bismuth oxide (pictured) was developed by Zhai et al.

PDRC coatings such as paints may be advantageous given their direct application to surfaces, simplifying preparation and reducing costs, although not all coatings are inexpensive. A 2022 study stated that coatings generally offer "strong operability, convenient processing, and low cost, which have the prospect of large-scale utilization". PDRC coatings have been developed in colors other than white while still demonstrating high solar reflectance and heat emissivity.

Coatings must be durable and resistant to soiling, which is achievable with porous materials or hydrophobic topcoats that can withstand cleaning, although hydrophobic coatings use polytetrafluoroethylene or similar compounds to be water-resistant. Negative environmental effects can be mitigated by limiting use of toxic solvents common in paints, such as acetone. Non-toxic and water-based paints have been developed.

Porous polymer coatings (PPCs) exhibit excellent PDRC performance. These polymers have high concentrations of tiny pores, which scatter light effectively at the boundary between the polymer and the air. This scattering enhances both solar reflectance (yielding more than 96%) and thermal emittance (to 97%), lowering surface temperatures six degrees below the surroundings at noon in Phoenix. This process is solution-based, aiding scalability. Dye of the desired color is coated on the polymer. Compared to traditional dye in porous polymer, in which the dye is mixed in the polymer, the new design can cool more effectively.

A 2018 study reported significantly lowered coating costs, stating that "photonic media, when properly randomized to minimize the photon transport mean free path, can be used to coat a black substrate and reduce its temperature by radiative cooling". This coating could "outperform commercially available solar-reflective white paint for daytime cooling" without expensive manufacturing steps or materials.

Candidate coatings
Coating	Reflectance	Emittance	Temperature reduction	Commercial coating	Notes
Aluminum phosphate	97%	90%	~4.2 °C	~4.8 °C	Predicted estimated cost by Dong et al. at $1.2/m^{2}, tested in Guangzhou (daytime humidity 41%), selective emitter (SE)
Ultrawhite BaSO_{4}	98.1%	95%	~4.5 °C		Paint with 60% volume concentration, "providing great reliability, convenient paint form, ease of use, and compatibility with the commercial paint fabrication process"
Porous polydimethylsiloxane	95%	96.5%	~8 °C		Sponge emitter template method for coatings, avoids hazardous etching agents (e.g., hydrofluoric acid, hydrogen peroxide, acetic acid) or VOCs (e.g., acetone, dimethylformamide, tetrahydrofuran, hexane), "compatibility with large-scale production", tested in Hangzhou (daytime humidity ~61%)
Waterborne thermochromic resins	96%	94%	~7.1 °C		Free of ecotoxic and carcinogenic titanium dioxide, "can be produced at a large scale and conveniently coated on various substrates through traditional drop casting, spraying, roller painting, or spin-coating methods" and "switchable [between] solar heating and radiative cooling", tested in Shanghai (daytime humidity ~28%)
Barium sulphate, calcium carbonate, and silicon dioxide particle coating	97.6%	89%	~8.3 °C	~5.5 °C lower than white paints	"For large-scale commercial production" with a predicted estimated cost of $0.5/m^{2}, tested in Weihai (daytime humidity 40%)
α-Bismuth(III) oxide	99%	97%	~2.31 °C		Average cooling power 68 W/m^{2} "low cost of raw oxide materials, and simple preparation process", tested in Nanjing (daytime humidity 54%)

=== Films ===
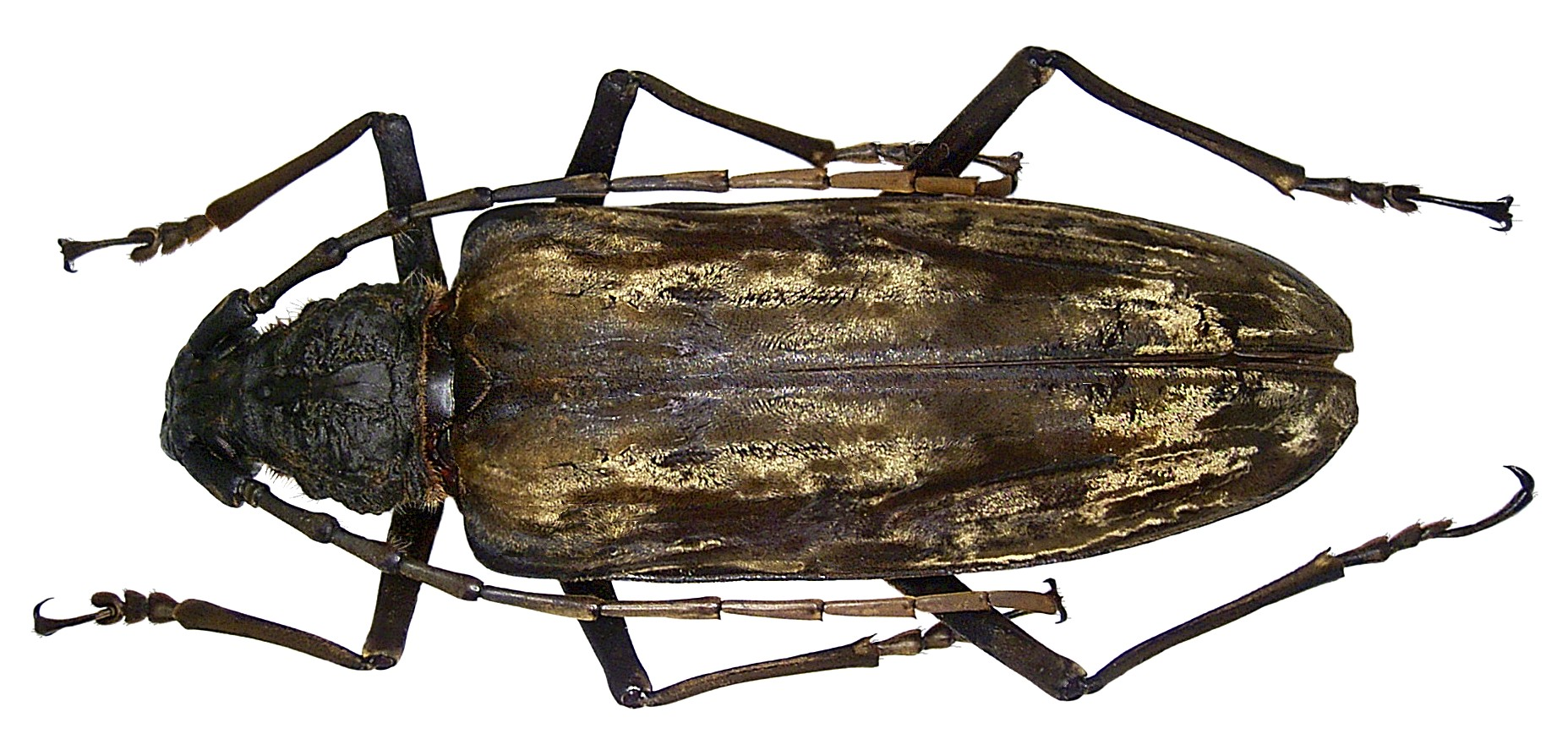
A photonic radiator film based on the longicorn beetle Neocerambyx gigas exhibited 95% solar irradiance and 96% emissivity.

Many thin films offer high solar reflectance and heat emittance. However, films with precise patterns or structures are not scalable "due to the cost and technical difficulties inherent in large-scale precise lithography" (2022), or "due to complex nanoscale lithography/synthesis and rigidity" (2021).

The polyacrylate hydrogel film from the 2022 study has broader applications, including potential uses in building construction and large-scale thermal management systems. This research focused on a film developed for hybrid passive cooling. The film uses sodium polyacrylate, a low-cost industrial material, to achieve high solar reflectance and high mid-infrared emittance. A significant feature of this material is its ability to absorb atmospheric moisture, aiding evaporative cooling. This tripartite mechanism allows for efficient cooling under varying atmospheric conditions, including high humidity or limited access to clear skies.

Candidates
Coating	Reflectance	Emittance	Temperature reduction	Commercial coating	Notes
Facile microstamping method, film on low-cost polymer PDMS	95%	96%	5.1 °C		"Promising for scale-up production"
Phase inversion process using cellulose acetate and calcium silicate	97.3%	97.2%	7.3 °C		90.7 W⋅m^{−2}), "a low-cost, scalable composite film with novel dendritic cell-like structures", tested in Qingdao
Superhydrophobic porous PDMS			11.52 °C		"The film is promising to be widely used for long-term cooling for outdoor applications."
Fluorine-free reagents and SiO_{2} particle composite film	85%	95%	12.2 °C		Manufactured with "a simple preparation process, which has characteristics of low-cost environmental friendliness and excellent machinal durability", tested in Hubei
Hierarchical flexible fibrous cellulose (wood pulp) film	93.8%	98.3%	to 11.3 °C		"The first time to realize high crystallinity and hierarchical microstructures in regenerated cellulose materials by the self-assembly of cellulose macromolecules at the molecular level", which "will provide new perspectives for the development of flexible cellulose materials"
Periodic pyramid-textured PDMS radiative film			2 °C.		Commercial silicon solar cells
Nanoporous anodic aluminum oxide film					Improved flat solar cell efficiency by ~2.72%, concentrated solar cell by ~16.02%

=== Metafabrics ===
PDRCs can be made of metafabrics, which can be used in clothing to regulate body temperatures. Most metafabrics are made of petroleum-based fibers. For instance, 2023 study reported that a that "new flexible cellulose fibrous films with wood-like hierarchical microstructures need to be developed for wearable PDRC applications".

A 2021 study chose a composite of titanium oxide and polylactic acid (TiO_{2}–PLA) with a polytetrafluoroethylene (PTFE) lamination. The fabric underwent optical and thermal characterization, measuring reflectivity and emissivity. Numerical simulations, including Lorenz–Mie theory and Monte Carlo simulations, were crucial in predicting the fabric's performance and guiding optimization. Mechanical testing was conducted to assess the fabric's durability, strength, and practicality.

The study reported exceptional ability to facilitate radiative cooling. The fabric achieved 94.5% emissivity and 92.4% reflectivity. This combination of high emissivity and reflectivity is central to its cooling capabilities, significantly outperforming traditional fabrics. Additionally, the fabric's mechanical properties, including strength, durability, waterproofness, and breathability, confirmed its suitability for clothing.

Candidates
Coating	Reflectance	Emittance	Notes	
Eco-friendly bio-derived regenerable polymer alginate to modify cotton fiber and then in-matrix generate CaCO_{3} nano- or other micro-particles	90%	97%	5.4 °C	"Fully compatible with industrial processing facilities" and with "effective UV protection properties with a UPF value of 15, is fast-dry, and is stable against washing"
Wearable hat constructed of a radiative cooling paper with SiO_{2} fibers and fumed SiO_{2}	97%	91%		Reduced temperatures for the hair of the wearer by 12.9 °C when compared with a basic white cotton hat (and 19 °C when compared with no hat), waterproof and air-permeable, "suitable for the manufacture of radiative cooling hat to achieve the thermal management of human head"

=== Aerogels ===
Aerogels offer a potential low-cost material scalable for mass production. Some aerogels can be considered a more environmentally friendly alternative to other materials, with degradable potential and the absence of toxic chemicals. Aerogels can be useful as thermal insulation to reduce solar absorption and parasitic heat gain to improve the cooling performance of PDRC.

Candidates
Coating	Reflectance	Emittance	Temperature reduction	Notes
Superhydrophobic waste-paper–based (cellulose) aerogel	93%	91%	8.5 °C	In a building energy simulation the aerogel "showed that 43.4% of cooling energy on average could be saved compared to the building baseline consumption" in China if widely implemented.
Degradable and superhydrophobic stereo-complex poly (lactic acid) aerogel with low thermal conductivity	89%	93%	3.5 °C	"Opens an environmentally sustainable pathway to radiative cooling applications"
Low-cost silica–alumina nanofibrous aerogels (SAFAs) synthesized by electrospinning	95%	93%	5 °C	"The SAFAs exhibit high compression fatigue resistance, robust fire resistance and excellent thermal insulation" with "low cost and high performance", shows potential for further studies
Clear SiO_{2} aerogel			7.7 °C	Used an optical modulator (n-hexadecane) in microparticles within a silicone elastomer matrix. Commercial silicon solar cells.

=== Nano bubbles ===
Pigments absorb light. Soap bubbles show a prism of different colors on their surfaces. These colors result from the way light interacts with differing thicknesses of the bubble's surface, termed structural color. One study reported that cellulose nanocrystals (CNCs), which are derived from the cellulose found in plants, could be made into iridescent, colorful films without added pigment. They made films with blue, green and red colors that, when placed under sunlight, were an average of nearly 7 °F cooler than the surrounding air. The film generated over 120 W⋅m^{−2} of cooling power.

=== Biodegradable surfaces ===
Many proposed radiative cooling materials are not biodegradable. A 2022 study reported that "sustainable materials for radiative cooling have not been sufficiently investigated".

Candidates
Coating	Reflectance	Emittance	Temperature reduction	Notes
Eco-friendly porous polymer structure via thermally induced phase separation	91%	92%	9 °C	Sufficient durability for use on buildings and highest cooling effect reported "among all organic-based passive radiation cooling emitters"

=== Micro-grating ===
A silica micro-grating photonic device cooled commercial silicon cells by 3.6 °C under solar intensity of 830–990 W⋅m^{−2}.

== Applications ==
Passive daytime radiative cooling has "the potential to simultaneously alleviate the two major problems of energy crisis and global warming" along with an "environmental protection refrigeration technology". PDRCs have an array of potential applications, but are now most often applied to various aspects of the built environment, such as building envelopes, cool pavements, and other surfaces to decrease energy demand, costs, and CO_{2} emissions. PDRC has been applied for indoor space cooling, outdoor urban cooling, solar cell efficiency, power plant condenser cooling, among other applications. For outdoor applications, PDRC durability is an important requirement.

=== Indoor space cooling ===
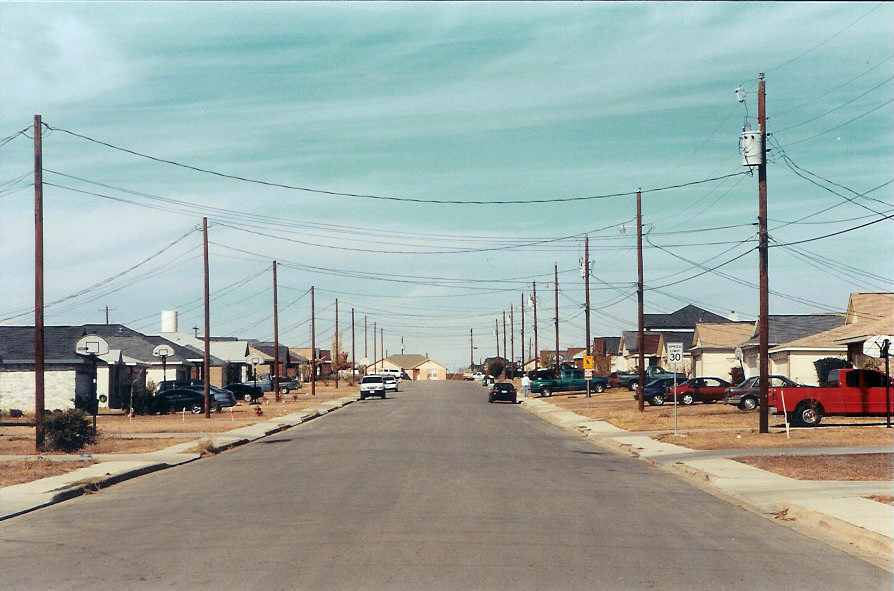
Single-family detached homes in the US suburbs are estimated to lower energy costs by 26% to 46% with PDRC implementation.

The most common application is on building envelopes, including cool roofs. A PDRC can double the energy savings of a white roof. This makes PDRCs an alternative or supplement to air conditioning that lowers energy demand and reduces air conditioning's release of hydrofluorocarbons (HFC) into the atmosphere. HFCs can be thousands of times more potent than CO_{2}.

Air conditioning accounts for 12%–15% of global energy usage, while CO_{2} emissions from air conditioning account for "13.7% of energy-related CO_{2} emissions, approximately 52.3 EJ yearly" or 10% of total emissions. Air conditioning applications are expected to rise. However, this can be significantly reduced with the mass production of low-cost PDRCs for indoor space cooling. A multilayer PDRC surface covering 10% of a building's roof can replace 35% of air conditioning used during the hottest hours of daytime.

In suburban single-family residential areas, PDRCs can lower energy costs by 26% to 46% in the United States and lower temperatures on average by 5.1 °C. With the addition of "cold storage to utilize the excess cooling energy of water generated during off-peak hours, the cooling effects for indoor air during the peak-cooling-load times can be significantly enhanced" and air temperatures may be reduced by 6.6–12.7 °C.

In cities, PDRCs can produce significant energy and cost savings. In a study on US cities, Zhou et al. found that "cities in hot and arid regions can achieve high annual electricity consumption savings of >2200 kilowatt-hours (kW⋅h), while <400 kW⋅h is attainable in colder and more humid cities", ranking from highest to lowest by electricity consumption savings as follows: Phoenix (~2500 kW⋅h), Las Vegas (~2250 kW⋅h), Austin (~2100 kW⋅h), Honolulu (~2050 kW⋅h), Atlanta (~1500 kW⋅h), Indianapolis (~1200 kW⋅h), Chicago (~1150 kW⋅h), New York City (~900 kW⋅h), Minneapolis (~850 kW⋅h), Boston (~750 kW⋅h), Seattle (~350 kW⋅h). In a study projecting energy savings for Indian cities in 2030, Mumbai and Kolkata had a lower energy savings potential, Jaisalmer, Varansai, and Delhi had a higher potential, although with significant variations from April to August dependent on humidity and wind cover.

The growing interest and rise in PDRC application to buildings has been attributed to cost savings related to "the sheer magnitude of the global building surface area, with a market size of ~$27 billion in 2025", as estimated in a 2020 study.

=== Outdoor urban space cooling ===
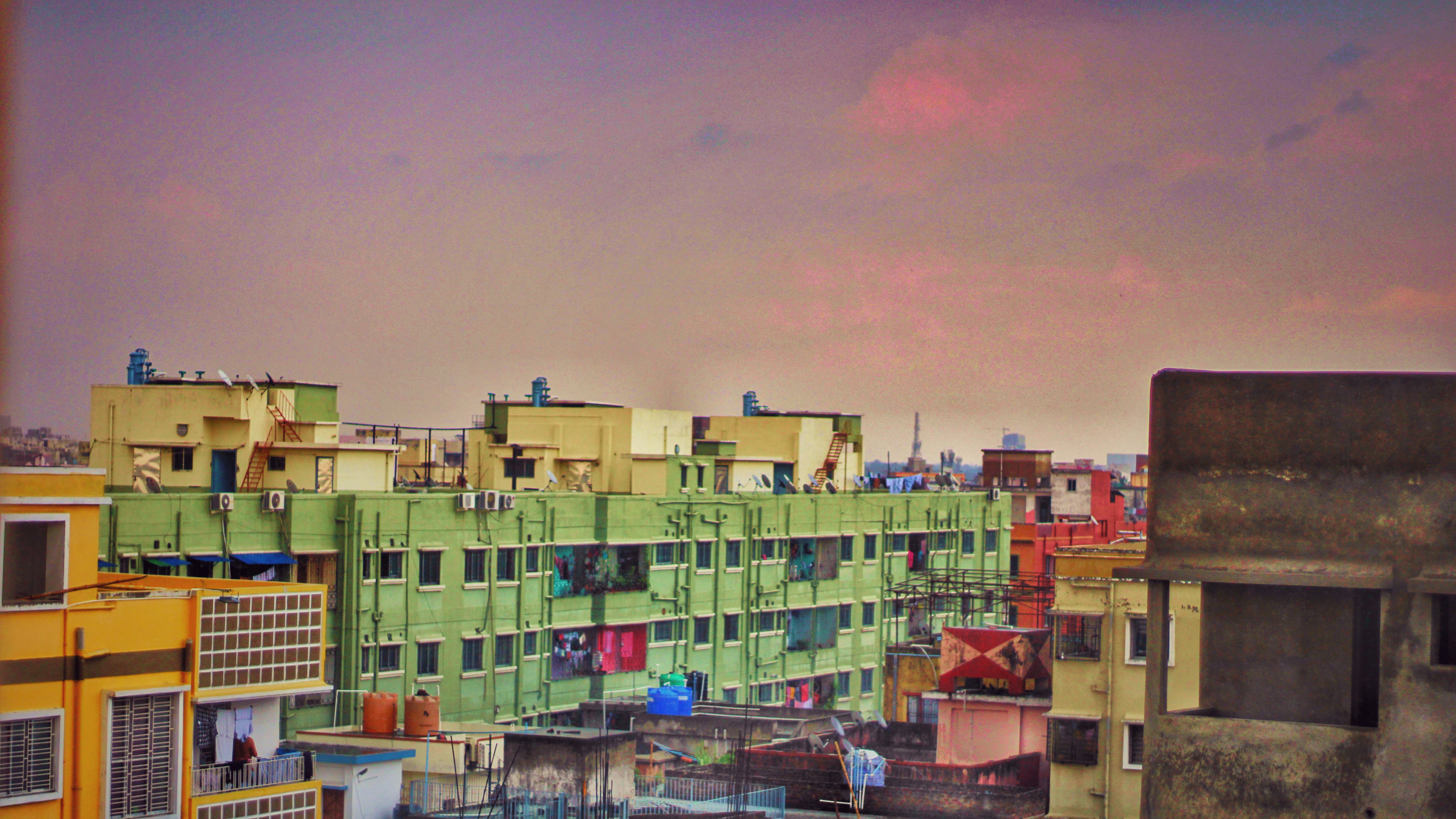
A PDRC installed on a roof in Kolkata exhibited a nearly 4.9 °C (8.8 °F) decrease in surface ground temperatures (with an average reduction of 2.2 °C or 4.0 °F).

PDRC surfaces can mitigate extreme heat from the urban heat island effect that occurs in over 450 cities worldwide. It can be as much as 10–12 °C (18–22 °F) hotter in urban areas than nearby rural areas. On an average hot summer day, the roofs of buildings can be 27–50 °C (49–90 °F) hotter than the surrounding air, warming air temperatures further through convection. Well-insulated dark rooftops are significantly hotter than all other urban surfaces, including asphalt pavements, further expanding air conditioning demand (which further accelerates global warming and urban heat island through the release of waste heat into the ambient air) and increasing risks of heat-related disease and fatal health effects.

PDRCs can be applied to building roofs and urban shelters to significantly lower surface temperatures with zero energy consumption by reflecting heat out of the urban environment and into outer space. The primary obstacle to PDRC implementation is the glare that may be caused through the reflection of visible light onto surrounding buildings. Colored PDRC surfaces may mitigate glare. such as Zhai et al. "Super-white paints with commercial high-index (n~1.9) retroreflective spheres", or the use of retroreflective materials (RRM) may also mitigate glare. Surrounding buildings without PDRC may weaken the cooling power of PDRCs.

Even when installed on roofs in highly dense urban areas, broadband radiative cooling panels lower surface temperatures at the sidewalk level. A 2022 study assessed the effects of PDRC surfaces in winter, including non-modulated and modulated PDRCs, in the Kolkata metropolitan area. A non-modulated PDRC with a reflectance of 0.95 and emissivity of 0.93 decreased ground surface temperatures by nearly 4.9 °C (8.8 °F) and with an average daytime reduction of 2.2 °C (4.0 °F).

While in summer the cooling effects of broadband non-modulated PDRCs may be desirable, they could present an uncomfortable "overcooling" effect for city populations in winter and thus increase energy use for heating. This can be mitigated by broadband modulated PDRCs, which they found could increase daily ambient urban temperatures by 0.4–1.4 °C (0.72–2.52 °F) in winter. While in Kolkata "overcooling" is unlikely, elsewhere it could have unwanted impacts. Therefore, modulated PDRCs may be preferred in cities with warm summers and cold winters for controlled cooling, while non-modulated PDRCs may be more beneficial for cities with hot summers and moderate winters.

In a study on urban bus shelters, it was found that most shelters fail at providing thermal comfort for commuters, while a tree could provide 0.5 °C (0.90 °F) more cooling. Other methods to cool shelters often involve air conditioning or other energy intensive measures. Urban shelters with PDRC roofing can significantly reduce temperatures with zero energy input, while adding "a non-reciprocal mid-infrared cover" can increase benefits by reducing incoming atmospheric radiation as well as reflecting radiation from surrounding buildings.

For outdoor urban space cooling, a 2021 study recommended that PDRC in urban areas primarily focus on increasing albedo so long as emissivity can be maintained above 90%.

=== Solar energy efficiency ===
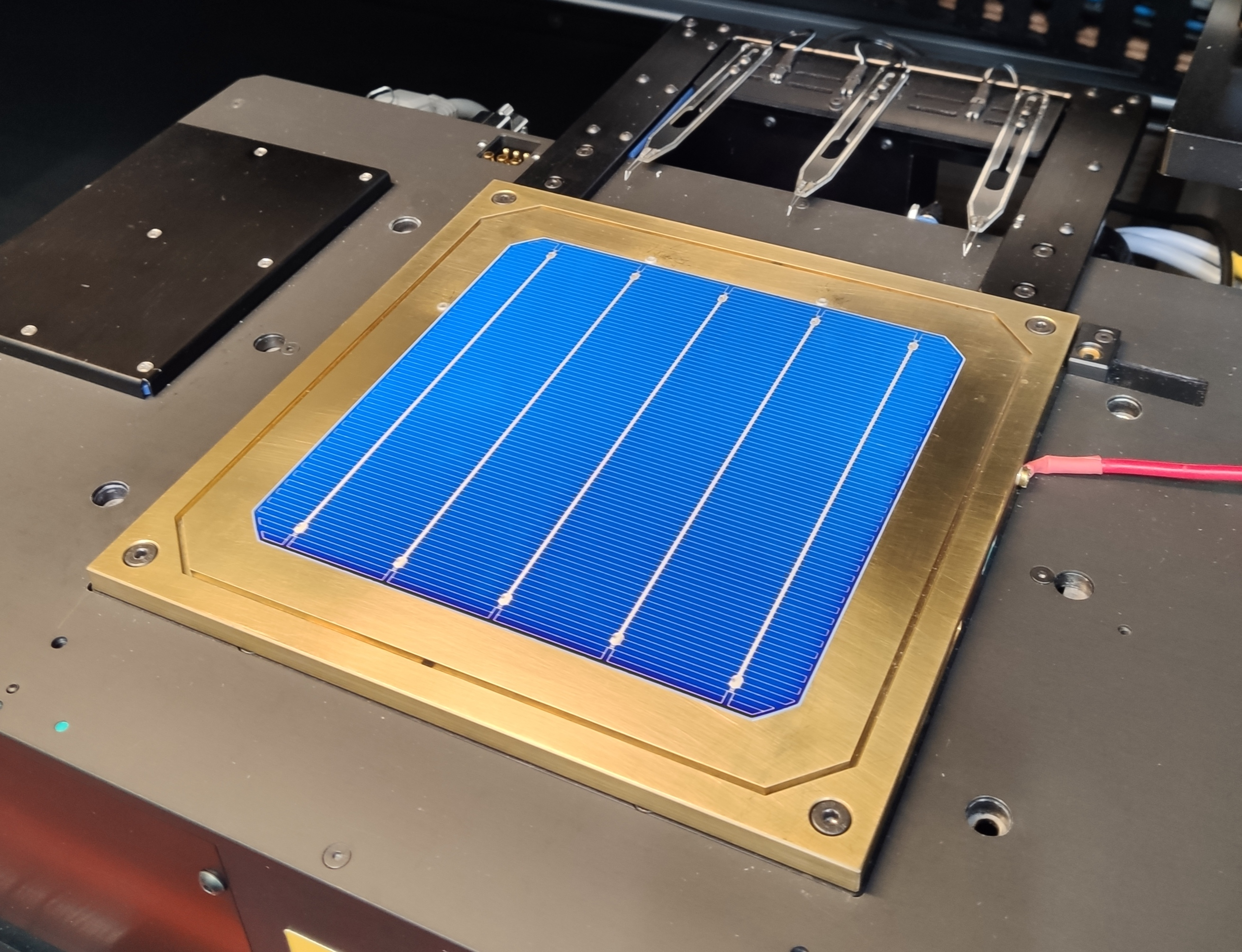
Solar cell efficiency can be improved with PDRC application to reduce overheating and degradation of cells.

PDRC surfaces can be integrated with solar energy plants, referred to as solar energy–radiative cooling (SE–RC), to improve functionality and performance by preventing solar cells from 'overheating' and thus degrading. Since silicon solar cells have a maximum efficiency of 33.7% (with the average commercial panel reaching around 20%), the majority of absorbed power produces excess heat and increases the operating temperature. Solar cell efficiency declines 0.4–0.5% for every 1 °C increase in temperature.

PDRC can extend the life of solar cells by lowering the operating temperature of the system. Integrating PDRCs into solar energy systems is also relatively simple, given that "most solar energy harvesting systems have a sky-facing flat plate structural design, which is similar to radiative cooling systems". Integration has been reported to increase energy gain per unit area while increasing the fraction of the day the cell operates.

Methods have been proposed to potentially enhance cooling performance. One 2022 study proposed using a "full-spectrum synergetic management (FSSM) strategy to cool solar cells, which combines radiative cooling and spectral splitting to enhance radiative heat dissipation and reduce the waste heat generated by the absorption of sub-BG photons".

=== Personal thermal management ===
Personal thermal management (PTM) employs PDRC in fabrics to regulate body temperatures during extreme heat. While other fabrics are useful for heat accumulation, they "may lead to heat stroke in hot weather". A 2021 study claimed that "incorporating passive radiative cooling structures into personal thermal management technologies could effectively defend humans against intensifying global climate change".

Wearable PDRCs can come in different forms and target outdoor workers. Products are at the prototype stage. Although most textiles are white, colored wearable materials in select colors may be appropriate in some contexts.

=== Power plant condenser cooling ===
Power plant condensers used in thermoelectric power plants and concentrated solar plants (CSP) can cool water for effective use within the heat exchanger. A study of a pond covered with a radiative cooler reported that 150 W/m^{2} flux could be achieved without loss of water. PDRC can reduce water use and thermal pollution caused by water cooling.

A review reported that supplementing the air-cooled condenser for radiative cooling panels in a thermoelectric power plant condenser achieved a 4096 kWhth/day cooling effect with a pump energy consumption of 11 kWh/day. A concentrated solar plant (CSP) on the CO_{2} supercritical cycle at 550 °C was reported to produce 5% net output gain over an air-cooled system by integration with 14 m2 /kWe capacity radiative cooler.

=== Thermal regulation of buildings ===
In addition to cooling, PDRC surfaces can be modified for bi-directional thermal regulation (cooling and heating). This can be achieved through switching thermal emittance between high and low values.

=== Thermoelectric generation ===
When combined with a thermoelectric generator, a PDRC surface can generate small amounts of electricity.

=== Automobile and greenhouse cooling ===
Thermally enclosed spaces, including automobiles and greenhouses, are particularly susceptible to harmful temperature increases. This is because of the heavy presence of windows, which are transparent to incoming solar radiation yet opaque to outgoing long-wave thermal radiation, which causes them to heat rapidly in the sun. Automobile temperatures in direct sunlight can rise to 60–82 °C when ambient temperatures is only 21 °C.

=== Water harvesting ===
Dew harvesting yields may be improved via with PDRC. Selective PDRC emitters that have a high emissivity and broadband emitters may produce varying results. In one study using a broadband PDRC, the device condensed ~8.5 mL day of water for 800 W/m^{2} of peak solar intensity. Whereas selective emitters may be less advantageous in other contexts, they may be superior for dew harvesting applications. PDRCs could improve atmospheric water harvesting by being combined with solar vapor generation systems to improve water collection rates.

=== Water and ice cooling ===
PDRC surfaces can be installed over the surface of a body of water for cooling. In a controlled study, a body of water was cooled 10.6 °C below the ambient temperature with the usage of a photonic radiator.

PDRC surfaces have been developed to cool ice and prevent ice from melting under sunlight. It has been proposed as a sustainable method for ice protection. This can also be applied to protect refrigerated food from spoiling.

== Side effects ==
Jeremy Munday writes that although "unexpected effects will likely occur", PDRC structures "can be removed immediately if needed, unlike methods that involve dispersing particulate matter into the atmosphere, which can last for decades". Stratospheric aerosol injection "might cause potentially dangerous threats to the Earth's basic climate operations" that may not be reversible, preferring PDRC. Zevenhoven et al. state that "instead of stratospheric aerosol injection (SAI), cloud brightening or a large number of mirrors in the sky ("sunshade geoengineering") to block out or reflect incoming (short-wave, SW) solar irradiation, long-wavelength (LW) thermal radiation can be selectively emitted and transferred through the atmosphere into space".

=== "Overcooling" and PDRC modulation ===
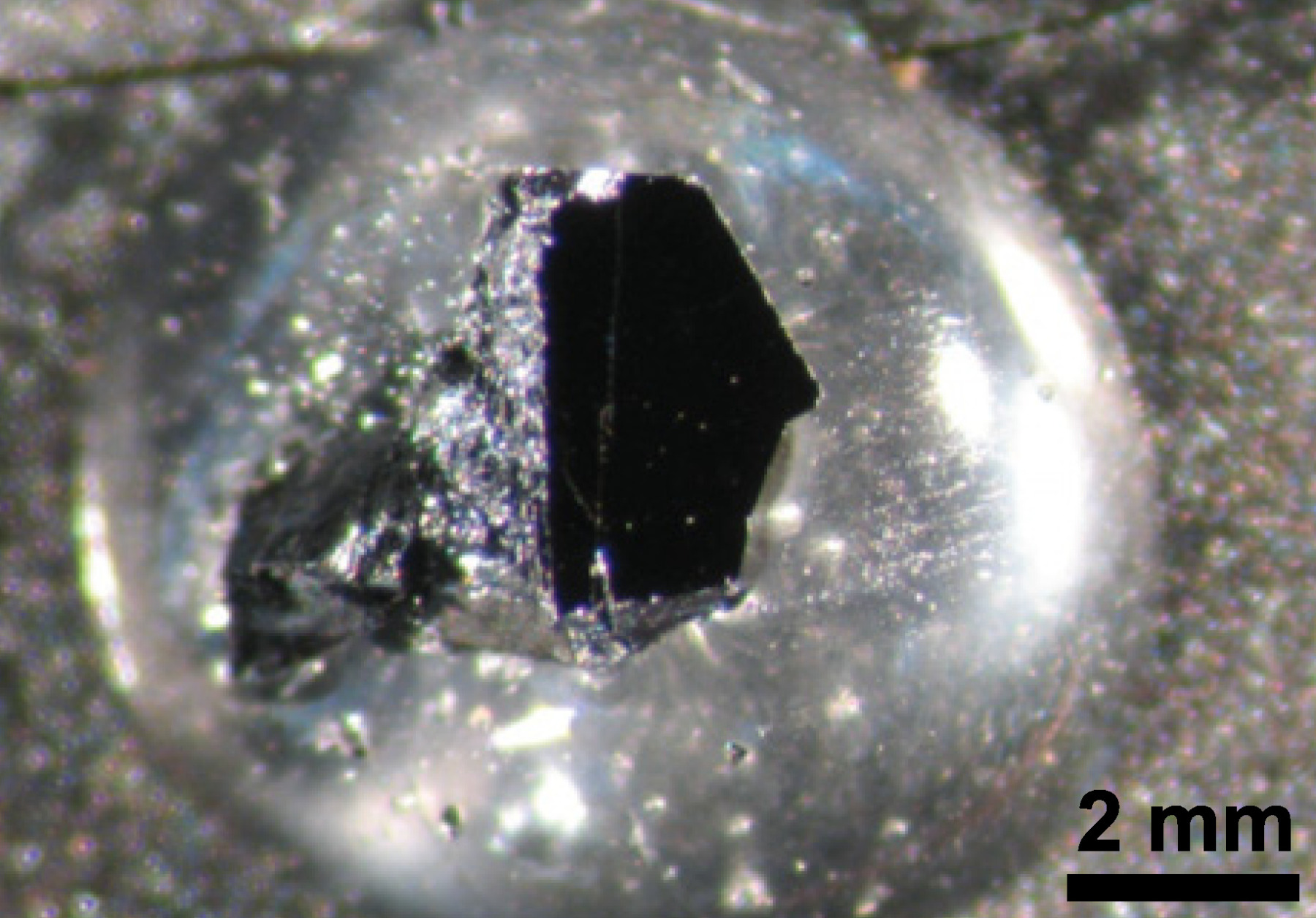
Modifying PDRCs with vanadium dioxide (pictured) can achieve temperature-based 'switching' from cooling to heating to mitigate the "overcooling" effect.

"Overcooling" is cited as a side effect of PDRCs that may be problematic, especially when PDRCs are applied in high-population areas with hot summers and cool winters, characteristic of temperate zones. While PDRC application in these areas can be useful in summer, in winter it can result in an increase in energy consumption for heating and thus may reduce the benefits of PDRCs on energy savings and emissions. As per Chen et al., "to overcome this issue, dynamically switchable coatings have been developed to prevent overcooling in winter or cold environments".

The detriments of overcooling can be reduced by modulation of PDRCs, harnessing their passive cooling abilities during summer, while modifying them to passively heat during winter. Modulation can involve "switching the emissivity or reflectance to low values during the winter and high values during the warm period". In 2022, Khan et al. concluded that "low-cost optically modulated" PDRCs are "under development" and "are expected to be commercially available on the market soon with high future potential to reduce urban heat in cities without leading to an overcooling penalty during cold periods".

There are various methods of making PDRCs 'switchable' to mitigate overcooling. Most research has used vanadium dioxide (VO2), an inorganic compound, to achieve temperature-based 'switchable' cooling and heating effects. While, as per Khan et al., developing VO2 is difficult, their review found that "recent research has focused on simplifying and improving the expansion of techniques for different types of applications". Chen et al. found that "much effort has been devoted to VO2 coatings in the switching of the mid-infrared spectrum, and only a few studies have reported the switchable ability of temperature-dependent coatings in the solar spectrum". Temperature-dependent switching requires no extra energy input to achieve both cooling and heating.

Other methods of PDRC 'switching' require extra energy input to achieve desired effects. One such method involves changing the dielectric environment. This can be done through "reversible wetting" and drying of the PDRC surface with common liquids such as water and alcohol. However, for this to be implemented on a mass scale, "the recycling, and utilization of working liquids and the tightness of the circulation loop should be considered in realistic applications".

Another method involves 'switching' through mechanical force, which may be useful and has been "widely investigated in [PDRC] polymer coatings owing to their stretchability". For this method, "to achieve a switchable coating in εLWIR, mechanical stress/strain can be applied in a thin PDMS film, consisting of a PDMS grating and embedded nanoparticles". One study estimated, with the use of this method, that "19.2% of the energy used for heating and cooling can be saved in the US, which is 1.7 times higher than the only cooling mode and 2.2 times higher than the only heating mode", which may inspire additional research and development.

=== Glare and visual appearance ===
Glare caused from surfaces with high solar reflectance may present visibility concerns that can limit PDRC application, particularly within urban environments at the ground level. PDRCs that use a "scattering system" to generate reflection in a more diffuse manner have been developed and are "more favorable in real applications", as per Lin et al.

Low-cost PDRC colored paint coatings, which reduce glare and increase the color diversity of PDRC surfaces, have also been developed. While some of the surface's solar reflectance is lost in the visible light spectrum, colored PDRCs can still exhibit significant cooling power, such as a coating by Zhai et al., which used a α-Bi_{2}O_{3} coating (resembling the color of the compound) to develop a non-toxic paint that demonstrated a solar reflectance of 99% and heat emissivity of 97%.

Generally it is noted that there is a tradeoff between cooling potential and darker colored surfaces. Less reflective colored PDRCs can also be applied to walls while more reflective white PDRCs can be applied to roofs to increase visual diversity of vertical surfaces, yet still contribute to cooling.

== History ==
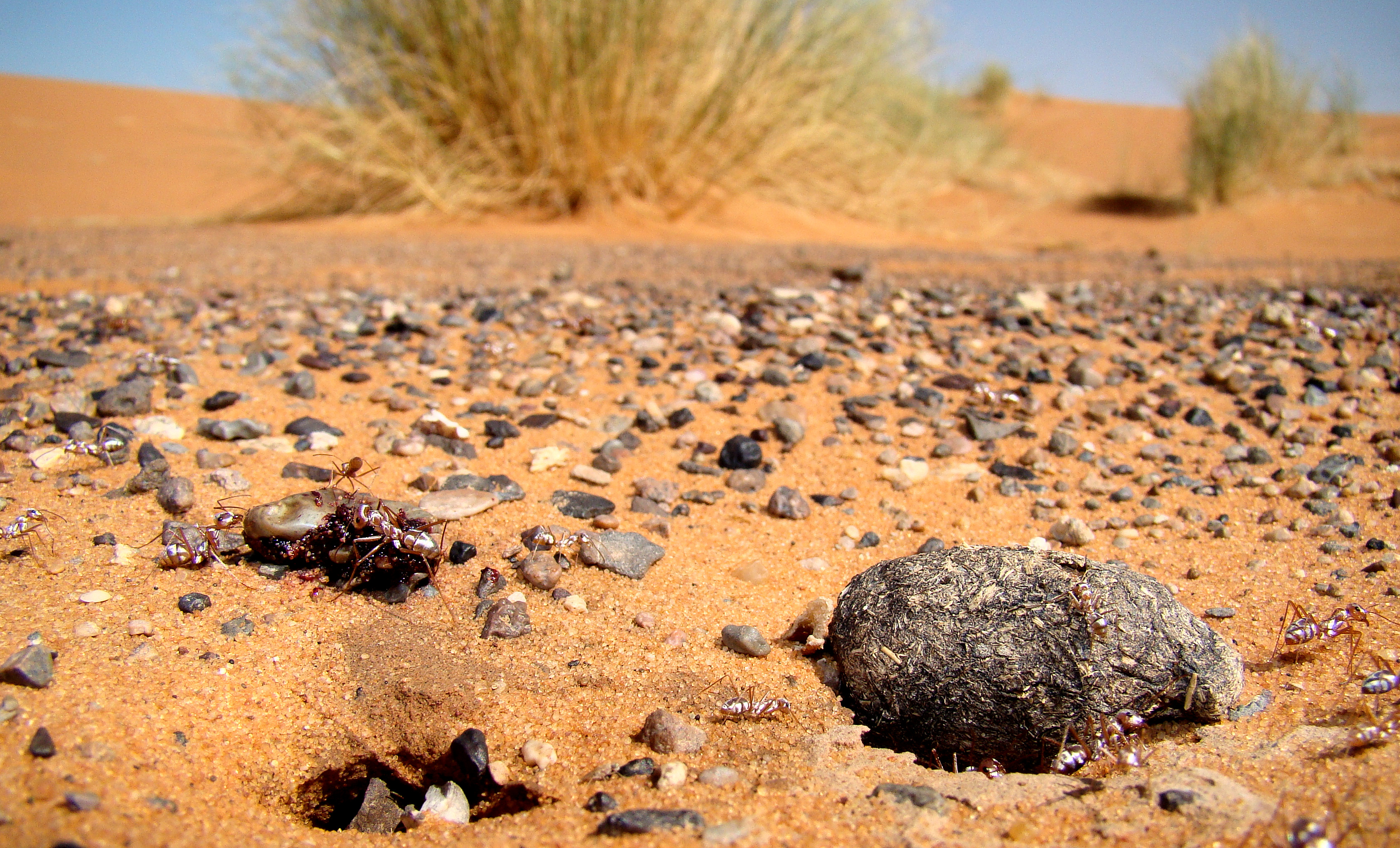
The Saharan silver ant's ability to cool its body temperature in extreme heat inspired early PDRC research.

Nocturnal passive radiative cooling has been recognized for thousands of years, with records showing awareness by the ancient Iranians, demonstrated through the construction of Yakhchāls, since 400 B.C.E.

PDRC was hypothesized by Félix Trombe in 1967. The first experimental setup was created in 1975, but was only successful for nighttime cooling. Further developments to achieve daytime cooling using different material compositions were not successful.

In the 1980s, Lushiku and Granqvist identified the infrared window as a potential way to access the ultracold outer space as a way to achieve passive daytime cooling.

Early attempts at developing passive radiative daytime cooling materials took inspiration from nature, particularly the Saharan silver ant and white beetles, noting how they cooled themselves in extreme heat.

Research and development in PDRC evolved rapidly in the 2010s with the discovery of the ability to suppress solar heating using photonic metamaterials, which widely expanded research and development in the field.

In 2024, Nissan introduced a paint that lowers car interior temperatures by up to 11.7 K (21 °F) in direct sunlight. It involves two types of particles, each operating at a different frequency. One reflects near-infrared light. The second converts other frequencies to match the infrared window, radiating the energy into space.

== See also ==
- Albedo
- Emissivity
- Energy conservation
- Low-energy building
- Passive cooling
- Passive house
- Passive solar building design
- Radiative cooling
- Reflective surfaces (climate engineering)
- Sustainable city
- Urban heat island
- Zero-energy building
