= Egyptian blue =

Pigment used in ancient Egypt

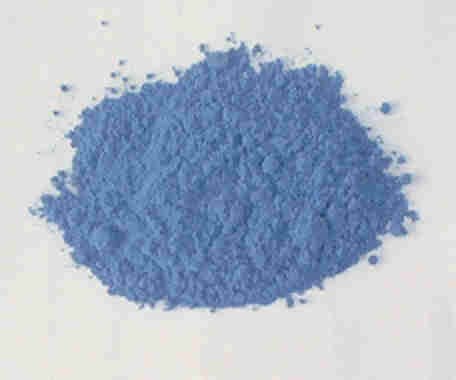

Color coordinates
- Hex triplet: #1034A6
- sRGB^{B} (r, g, b): (16, 52, 166)
- HSV (h, s, v): (226°, 90%, 65%)
- CIELCh_{uv} (L, C, h): (28, 82, 263°)
- ISCC–NBS descriptor: Vivid blue
- B: Normalized to [0–255] (byte)

Egyptian blue, also known as calcium copper silicate, calcium copper tetrasilicate, or cuprorivaite, is a pigment with the chemical formula CaCuSi_{4}O_{10} that was used in ancient Egypt for thousands of years. It is considered to be the first synthetic pigment.

Egyptian blue is produced from a mixture of silica, lime, copper, and an alkali. Its color is due to a calcium-copper tetrasilicate CaCuSi_{4}O_{10} of the same composition as the naturally occurring mineral cuprorivaite. It was first synthesized in Egypt during the Fourth Dynasty and used extensively until the end of the Roman period in Europe, after which its use declined significantly.

Apart from Egypt, it has also been found in the Near East, the Eastern Mediterranean, and the limits of the Roman Empire. It is unclear whether the pigment's existence elsewhere was a result of parallel invention or evidence of the technology's spread from Egypt to those areas.

After the Roman era, Egyptian blue fell out of use and, thereafter, the manner of its creation was forgotten. In modern times, scientists have been able to analyze its chemistry and reconstruct how to make it.

== History ==
The ancient Egyptians held the color blue in very high regard and were eager to present it on many media and in a variety of forms. They also desired to imitate the semiprecious stones turquoise and lapis lazuli, which were valued for their rarity and stark blue color. Use of naturally occurring minerals such as azurite to acquire this blue was impractical, as these minerals were rare and difficult to work. Therefore, to have access to the large quantities of blue color to meet demand, the Egyptians needed to manufacture the pigment themselves.

The earliest evidence for the use of Egyptian blue, identified by Egyptologist Lorelei H. Corcoran of The University of Memphis, is on an alabaster bowl dated to the late pre-dynastic period or Naqada III (circa 3250 BC), excavated at Hierakonpolis, and now in the Museum of Fine Arts, Boston. In the Middle Kingdom (2050–1652 BC) it continued to be used as a pigment in the decoration of tombs, wall paintings, furnishings, and statues, and by the New Kingdom (1570–1070 BC) began to be more widely used in the production of numerous objects. Its use continued throughout the Late period and Greco-Roman period, only dying out in the fourth century AD, when the secret to its manufacture was lost.

No written information exists in ancient Egyptian texts about the manufacture of Egyptian blue in antiquity, and it was first mentioned only in Roman literature by Vitruvius during the first century BC. He refers to it as caeruleum and describes in his work De architectura how it was produced by grinding sand, copper, and natron, and heating the mixture, shaped into small balls, in a furnace. Lime is necessary for the production as well, but probably lime-rich sand was used. Theophrastus gives it the Greek term κύανος (kyanos, blue), which originally probably referred to lapis lazuli. Finally, only at the beginning of the nineteenth century was interest renewed in learning more about its manufacture when it was investigated by Humphry Davy in 1815, and others such as W. T. Russell and F. Fouqué.

== Nomenclature ==
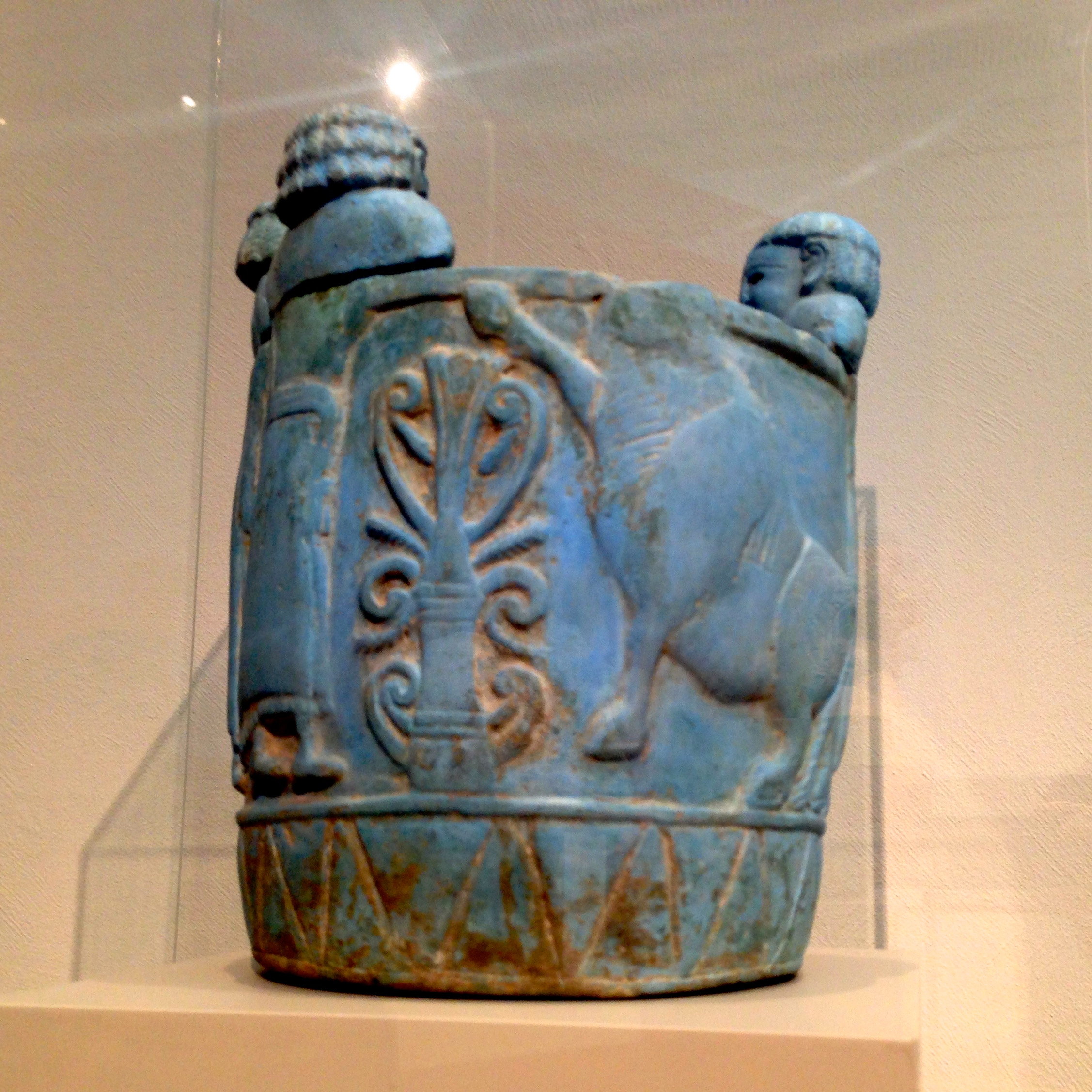
Pyxis made out of "Egyptian blue" faience: Imported to Italy from northern Syria, it was produced 750–700 BC. (Shown at Altes Museum in Berlin)

The ancient Egyptian word wꜣḏ signifies blue, blue-green, and green.

The term for the pigment in the Egyptian language is ḫsbḏ-jrjt (khesbedj irtiu), which referred to artificial lapis lazuli (ḫsbḏ). Sometimes, it is referred to in Egyptological literature as blue frit. Some have argued that this is an erroneous term that should be reserved for use to describe the initial phase of glass or glaze production, while others argue that Egyptian blue is a frit in both the fine and coarse form since it is a product of solid state reaction.

This pigment is attested among Ancient Greek writings, most notably from Theophrastus in De Lapidibus, where κύανος is described as having Egyptian, Scythian and Cyprian kinds. It was known to the Romans by the name caeruleum, derived from the Latin for sky or heaven, caelum. Vitruvius in De Architectura uses this name when outlining its recipe. Pliny the Elder also attests to this name in the Natural History.

The first recorded use of "Egyptian blue" as a color name in English was in 1809.

== Composition and manufacture ==
Several experiments have been carried out by scientists and archaeologists interested in analyzing the composition of Egyptian blue and the techniques used to manufacture it. It is now generally regarded as a multiphase material that was produced by heating together quartz sand, a copper compound, calcium carbonate, and a small amount of an alkali (ash from salt-tolerant, halophyte plants or natron) at temperatures ranging between 800 and 1,000 °C (1,470 and 1,830 °F) (depending on the amount of alkali used) for several hours. The result is cuprorivaite or Egyptian blue, carbon dioxide, and water vapor:

Cu_{2}CO_{3}(OH)_{2} + 8 SiO_{2} + 2 CaCO_{3} → 2 CaCuSi_{4}O_{10} + 3 CO_{2} + H_{2}O

In its final state, Egyptian blue consists of rectangular blue crystals together with unreacted quartz and some glass. From the analysis of a number of samples from Egypt and elsewhere, the weight percentage of the materials used to obtain Egyptian blue in antiquity was determined usually to range within these amounts:

- 60–70% silica (SiO_{2})
- 7–15% calcium oxide (CaO)
- 10–20% copper(II) oxide (CuO)

To obtain theoretical cuprorivaite, where only blue crystals occur, with no excess of unreacted quartz or formation of glass, these percentages would need to be used:

- 64% silica
- 15% calcium oxide
- 21% copper oxide

However, none of the analyzed samples from antiquity was made of this definitive composition, as all had excesses of silica, together with an excess of either CuO or CaO. This may have been intentional; an increase in the alkali content results in the pigment containing more unreacted quartz embedded in a glass matrix, which in turn results in a harder texture. Lowering the alkali content (less than 1%), though, does not allow glass to form and the resultant Egyptian blue is softer, with a hardness of 1–2 Mohs.

As with variations in component composition, the processing method employed also affected the texture of the resulting pigment, in terms of coarseness and fineness. Following a series of experiments, Tite et al. concluded that for fine-textured Egyptian blue, two stages were necessary to obtain uniformly interspersed crystals. First, the ingredients are heated, resulting in a coarse-textured product. This is then ground to a fine powder and water is added. The paste is then reshaped and fired again at temperatures ranging between 850 and 950 °C for one hour. These two stages were necessary to produce a paste with particles fine enough for the production of small objects. Coarse-textured Egyptian blue, however, would not have gone through the second stage. As the raw pigment was typically found in the form of slabs (in the dynastic periods) and balls (in the Greco-Roman period), these either could have been awaiting to further processing and refinement in texture, or they would have been ground as-is for use as a blue pigment.

The shade of blue reached was also related to the coarseness and fineness of Egyptian blue as it was determined by the degree of aggregation of the Egyptian blue crystals. Coarse Egyptian blue was relatively thick in form, due to the large clusters of crystals which adhere to the unreacted quartz. This clustering results in a dark blue color that is the appearance of coarse Egyptian blue. Alternatively, fine-textured Egyptian blue consists of smaller clusters that are uniformly interspersed between the unreacted quartz grains and tends to be light blue in color. Diluted light blue, though, is used to describe the color of fine-textured Egyptian blue that has a large amount of glass formed in its composition, which masks the blue color, and gives it a diluted appearance. It depends on the level of alkali added to the mixture, so with more alkali, more glass formed, and the more diluted the appearance. This type of Egyptian blue is especially evident during the eighteenth dynasty and later, and probably is associated with the surge in glass technology at this time.

If certain conditions were not met, the Egyptian blue would not be satisfactorily produced. For example, if the temperatures were above 1050 °C, it would become unstable. If too much lime was added, wollastonite (CaSiO_{3}) forms and gives the pigment a green color. Too much of the copper ingredients results in excesses of copper oxides cuprite and tenorite.

== Materials ==
The main component of Egyptian blue was the silica, and quartz sand found adjacent to the sites where Egyptian blue was being manufactured may have been its source, although no concrete evidence supports this hypothesis. The only evidence cited is by Jakcsh et al., who found crystals of titanomagnetite, a mineral found in desert sand, in samples collected from the tomb of Sabni (sixth dynasty). Its presence in Egyptian blue indicates that quartz sand, rather than flint or chert, was used as the silica source. This contrasts with the source of silica used for glass-making at Qantir (New Kingdom Ramesside site), which is quartz pebbles and not sand.

It is believed that calcium oxide was not added intentionally on its own during the manufacture of Egyptian blue, but introduced as an impurity in the quartz sand and alkali. As to whether the craftsmen involved in the manufacture realized the importance of adding lime to the Egyptian blue mixture is not clear from this.

The source of copper could have been either a copper ore (such as malachite), filings from copper ingots, or bronze scrap and other alloys. Before the New Kingdom, evidence is scarce as to which copper source was being used, but it is believed to have been copper ores. During the New Kingdom, evidence has been found for the use of copper alloys, such as bronze, due to the presence of varying amounts of tin, arsenic, or lead found in the Egyptian blue material. The presence of tin oxide could have come from copper ores that contained tin oxide and not from the use of bronze. However, no copper ores have been found with these amounts of tin oxide. Why a switch from the use of copper ores in earlier periods, to the use of bronze scrap during the Late Bronze Age is unclear as yet.

The total alkali content in analyzed samples of Egyptian blue is greater than 1%, suggesting the alkali was introduced deliberately into the mixture and not as an impurity from other components. Sources of alkali either could have been natron from areas such as Wadi Natroun and El-Kab, or plant ash. By measuring the amounts of potash and magnesia in the samples of Egyptian blue, it is generally possible to identify which source of alkali had been used, since the plant ash contains higher amounts of potash and magnesia than the natron. However, due to the low concentration of alkali in Egyptian blue, which is a mere 4% or less, compared to glass, for example, which is at 10–20%, identifying the source is not always easy. The alkali source likely was natron, although the reasons for this assumption are unclear. However, analysis by Jaksch et al. of various samples of Egyptian blue identified variable amounts of phosphorus (up to 2 wt %), suggesting the alkali source used was plant ash and not natron. Since the glass industry during the Late Bronze Age used plant ash as its source of alkali, a link in terms of the alkali used for Egyptian blue before and after the introduction of the glass industry might have been possible.

== Archaeological evidence ==
In the excavations at Amarna, Lisht, and Malkata at the beginning of the twentieth century, Flinders Petrie uncovered two types of vessels that he suggested were used in antiquity to make Egyptian blue: bowl-shaped pans and cylindrical vessels or saggers. In later excavations undertaken at Amarna by Barry Kemp in 1989, very small numbers of these "fritting" pans were uncovered, although various remaining pieces of Egyptian blue 'cake' were found, which allowed the identification of five different categories of Egyptian blue forms and the vessels associated with them: large round flat cakes, large flat rectangular cakes, bowl-shaped cakes, small sack-shaped pieces, and spherical shapes. No tin was found in the samples analyzed, which the authors suggest is an indication that use of scrap copper was possible instead of bronze.

In the 1930s, Mahmud Hamza excavated a number of objects related to the production of Egyptian blue at Qantir, such as Egyptian blue cakes and fragments in various stages of production, providing evidence that Egyptian blue was produced at the site. Recent excavations at the same site uncovered a large copper-based industry, with several associated crafts, namely bronze-casting, red-glass making, faience production, and Egyptian blue. Ceramic crucibles with adhering remains of Egyptian blue were found in the excavations, suggesting again it had been manufactured on site. These Egyptian blue 'cakes' possibly were later exported to other areas around the country to be worked, as a scarcity of finished Egyptian blue products existed on site. For example, Egyptian blue cakes were found at Zawiyet Umm el-Rakham, a Ramesside fort near the Libyan coast, indicating in fact that the cakes were traded, and worked at and reshaped away from their primary production site.

== Connections with other vitreous material and with metals ==
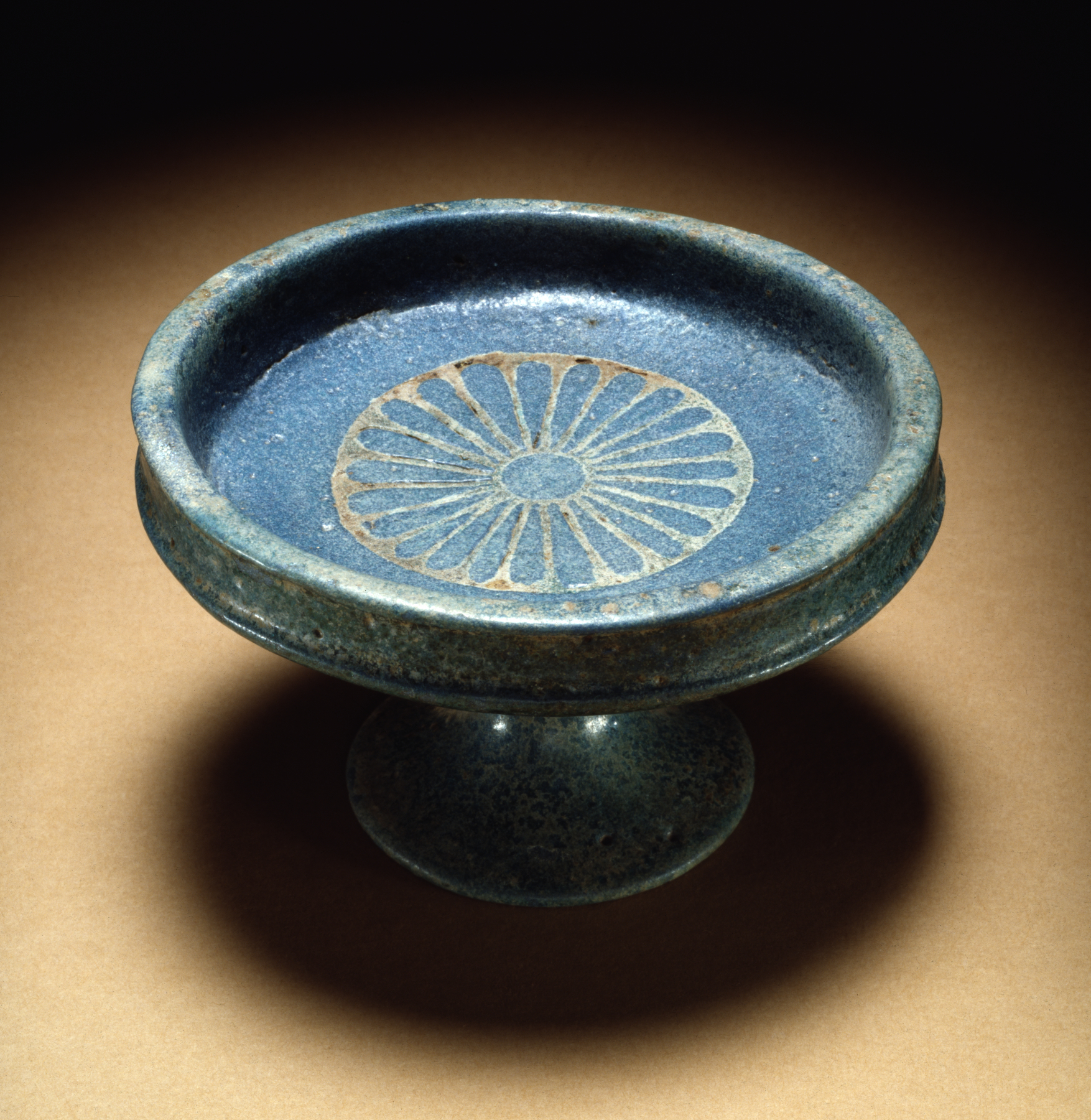
Blue faience saucer and stand, New Kingdom (1400–1325 BC)

Egyptian blue is closely related to the other vitreous materials produced by the ancient Egyptians, namely glass and Egyptian faience, and it is possible that the Egyptians did not employ separate terms to distinguish the three products from one another. Although it is easier to distinguish between faience and Egyptian blue, due to the distinct core of faience objects and their separate glaze layers, it sometimes is difficult to differentiate glass from Egyptian blue due to the very fine texture that Egyptian blue occasionally could have. This is especially true during the New Kingdom, as Egyptian blue became more refined and glassy and continued as such into the Greco-Roman period.

Since Egyptian blue, like faience, is a much older technology than glass, which only begins during the reign of Thutmose III (1479–1425 BC), changes in the manufacture of Egyptian blue undoubtedly were associated with the introduction of the glass industry.

Analysis of the source of copper used in the manufacture of Egyptian blue indicates a relationship with the contemporaneous metal industry. Whereas in the earlier periods, it is most probable that copper ores were used, during the reign of Tutmosis III, the copper ore is replaced by the use of bronze filings. This has been established by the detection of a specific amount of tin oxide in Egyptian blue, which only could have resulted from the use of tin bronze scraps as the source of copper, which coincides with the time when bronze became widely available in ancient Egypt.

== Occurrences outside Egypt ==
Egyptian blue was found in Western Asia during the middle of third millennium BC in the form of small artifacts and inlays, but not as a pigment. It was found in the Mediterranean area at the end of the Middle Bronze Age, and traces of tin were found in its composition suggesting the use of bronze scrap instead of copper ore as the source of copper. During the Roman period, use of Egyptian blue was extensive, as a pot containing the unused pigment, found in 1814 in Pompeii, illustrates. It was also found as unused pigment in the tombs of a number of painters. Etruscans also used it in their wall paintings. The related Chinese blue has been suggested as having Egyptian roots.

Later, Raphael used Egyptian blue in his Triumph of Galatea.

== Roman production ==
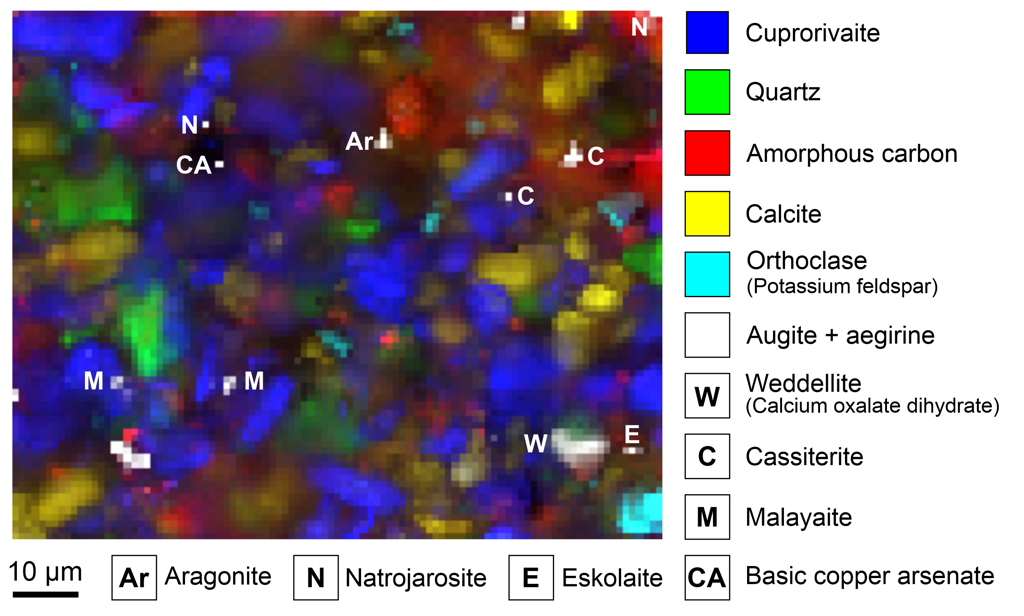
Raman microspectroscopic phase distribution map of a paint layer from the church of St. Peter above Gratsch showing several minor, major and trace compounds of Egyptian blue.

Around the turn of the eras, Roman sources report that a certain Vestorius transferred the production technology from Alexandria to Pozzuoli near Naples (Campania, Southern Italy). In fact, archaeological evidences confirm production sites in the northern Phlegraean Fields and seem to indicate a monopoly in the manufacture and trade of pigment spheres. Due to its almost exclusive use, Egyptian blue is the blue pigment par excellence of Roman antiquity; its art technological traces vanish in the course of the Middle Ages.

Early Medieval Egyptian blue (fifth/sixth century AD) was identified on a monochrome blue mural fragment from the church of St. Peter above Gratsch (South Tyrol, Northern Italy). By a new analytical approach based on Raman microspectroscopy, 28 different minerals with contents from the percent range down to 100 ppm were identified. Inclusion of knowledge from neighbouring disciplines made possible to read out the information about the type and provenance of the raw materials, synthesis and application of the pigment and ageing of the paint layer preserved in the previously not accessible trace components, and thus to reconstruct the individual "biography" of the Egyptian blue from St. Peter. This paradigm shift in the research history of Egyptian blue provided natural scientific evidences for the production in the northern Phlegraean fields (agreement with trace minerals found in the beach sands at the Gulf of Gaeta), the use of a sulphidic copper ore (instead of often-mentioned metallic copper or bronze), and plant ash as flux in the raw material mixture. Furthermore, indications for a synthesis predominated by solid state reactions were found, while the melting of the raw materials into glass most likely played a negligible role.

A follow-up study on Roman Imperial pigment balls excavated in Aventicum and Augusta Raurica (Switzerland; first to third century AD) confirmed the results in 2022. The consistent composition of around 40 identified minerals establishes a connection to the northern Phlegraean Fields; a sulphidic copper ore and plant ash have also left their marks. Thus, the Roman production monopoly probably existed for centuries. In addition, the analyses revealed unwanted by-products of the synthesis, locally limited to microparticles on the sphere's surfaces, which can be traced back to suboptimal burning times or mixing ratios, respectively: a cuprorivaite with crystal defects in its layer structure and a copper-bearing green glass phase, characterised by Raman spectroscopy for the first time.

== Modern applications ==
Egyptian blue's extremely powerful and long-lived infrared luminescence under visible light has enabled its presence to be detected on objects which appear unpainted to the human eye. This property has also been used to identify traces of the pigment on paintings produced as late as the sixteenth century, long after its use was presumed to have died out. The luminescence in the near-infrared, where neither fat nor hemoglobin show high absorption coefficients, in conjunction with the capacity of Egyptian blue to delaminate by splitting into nanosheets after immersion in water, also indicates it may have several high-technology applications, such as in biomedicine (e.g. bioimaging), telecommunications, laser technology, and security inks.

Egyptian blue pigment absorbs visible light, and emits light in the near-infrared range. This suggests that Egyptian blue pigment could be used in construction materials designed to cool rooftops and walls in sunny climates, and for tinting glass to improve photovoltaic cell performance.

Egyptian blue can be recreated by heating mixtures of silica, copper compounds, calcium, and alkali.

== See also ==
- Ancient Chinese glass – Glass made in China before the Qing dynasty (1644–1911)
- Blue pigments – Natural or synthetic materials
- Han purple and Han blue – Pigments developed in ancient China
- Lazurite – Alumino-silicate mineral whose blue colour is due to a sulfide species and not copper
- List of colors
- List of inorganic pigments
- Maya blue – Azure blue pigment made in pre-Columbian Mesoamerica
- Persian blue – Blue colour associated with Persian pottery
- Prussian blue – Synthetic pigment
- Egyptian blue shades – Variety of the color blue
