= Dropwise condensation =

In dropwise condensation the condensate liquid collects in the form of countless droplets of varying diameters on the condensing surface, instead of forming a continuous film, and does not wet the solid cooling surface. The droplets develop at points of surface imperfections (pits, scratches), called nucleation sites, and grow in size as more vapour condenses on its exposed surface. When the size of droplets is large there comes a time the droplet breakaway from the surface and knock off other droplets and carries it downstream. The moving droplet devours the droplets of smaller size. Dropwise condensation is one of the most effective mechanism of heat transfer and extremely large heat transfer coefficients can be achieved with this mechanism. In dropwise condensation, there is no liquid film to resist heat transfer, and as a result heat transfer coefficients can be achieved more than ten times larger than those associated with film condensation, although three to five times is more common. Heat transfer coefficients are large so designers can achieve a specified heat transfer rate with a smaller surface area and thus a smaller and less expensive condenser.

Dropwise condensation is achieved by adding a promoter chemical into the vapor or using roughened surfaces or surfaces coated with hydrophobic impurities like fatty acids or other organic compounds known as dropwise promoters. Dropwise condensation is induced artificially with the help of silicones, PTFE, waxes, and fatty acids. Most such materials are highly unstable and lose their effectiveness with time due to oxidation, fouling and wear. Dropwise condensation can be sustained by the combined effects of surface coating and periodic injection of the promoter into the vapor. When dropwise surfaces degrade, filmwise condensation occurs, so most condensers are designed on the assumption that film condensation will take place on the surface eventually. Dropwise condensation is useful in powerplant heat exchangers, thermal desalination, self-cleaning surfaces, and heating and air conditioning.

The total amount of heat transfer through a single droplet is a function of its radius and the size distribution over the condensation surface. The important factors involved in the mechanism of heat transfer through a single droplet are:

1. Thermal conduction through the droplet
2. Thermal conduction in the substrate material
3. Interphase matter transfer at the vapour–liquid interface
4. Curvature of the vapour–liquid interface
