= Air well =

An air well may refer to:

- Air well (condenser), a structure or device designed to promote the condensation of atmospheric moisture
- Air well (ventilation), an architectural feature designed to promote ventilation

== See also ==
- Atmospheric water generator
- Dew pond
- Fog fence
- Solar chimney
- Windcatcher
