= Kochavi =

Kochavi is a Hebrew surname – כּוֹכָבִי – which is also sometimes transliterated as Kohavi. Notable people with the surname include:

- Amit L. Kochavi (born 1997), Israeli entrepreneur
- Arye Kohavi (born 1967), Israeli entrepreneur
- Aviv Kochavi (born 1964), Israeli chief of military staff
- Doron Kochavi (born 1951), Israeli lawyer, businessperson, and philanthropist
- Moshe Kochavi (1928–2008), Israeli archeologist

It is also occasionally used as a personal name, e.g.:

- Kochavi Shemesh (1944-2019), Israeli lawyer, leader of Israeli Black Panthers
