= Al-Rantisi Hospital =

Hospital in Gaza Strip, Palestine

Geography
- Location: Nasser, Gaza City, Gaza Strip, Palestine
- Coordinates: 31°31′59″N 34°27′37″E

Organisation
- Type: Children's hospital

Abdel Aziz al-Rantisi Hospital (Arabic: مستشفى الرنتيسي) is a children's hospital in the Nasser neighborhood of Gaza City, Palestine. It is named after Abdel Aziz al-Rantisi, leader and co-founder of Hamas.

The hospital's pediatric palliative care unit, the Dr. Musa And Suhaila Nasir Pediatric Cancer Department, was created in 2019 by U.S. charity Palestine Children's Relief Fund.

As of November 2023, Bakr Gaoud was the head of the hospital.

== History ==
=== Water supply ===
In May 2020, the Israeli company Watergen installed a water-from-air device at the Al-Rantisi hospital. This initiative, a result of a collaboration with the Palestinian power company Mayet Al Ahel, aimed to provide clean and safe off-grid drinking water for the pediatric hospital's staff and patients. The project, led by Michael Mirilashvili, intended to address water scarcity in the Gaza Strip.

=== During the Gaza war ===
The hospital provided dialysis and other services prior to the Gaza war, when it was evacuated.

On November 11, 2023, Israeli forces were reported to have engaged with Hamas militants in the vicinity of a hospital. The Israeli army alleged that they had identified Hamas militants hiding among civilians in the area. Additionally, it was claimed that some militants utilized an evacuation corridor, which was opened for civilians, to flee the scene.

==== Claims of military use ====
The Israel Defense Forces (IDF) claim that Hamas has been using al-Rantisi hospital to store weapons and Israeli hostages, a claim that the United States, Israel's ally, supports. News agencies have not been able to independently verify IDF claims.

The IDF showed CNN a cache of weapons and explosives in the basement of the hospital, which was reportedly disconnected from the main medical facility. CNN quoted the International Committee of the Red Cross saying that "hospitals are given special protection under international humanitarian law in a time of war, but if militants store weapons there, or use them as a base of fire, then that protection falls away." Additionally, the IDF claimed that hostages had been held in this location. Evidence presented by the IDF for military use of the basement included a motorcycle with a bullet hole, ropes, and baby bottles. The IDF said the ropes indicated a hostage had been tied to a chair, and they said the baby bottles indicated a baby had been held hostage in the hospital basement. Improvised toilets were also found, which, according to the IDF, signified infrastructure to hold hostages, as well as an alleged tunnel entrance. Daniel Hagari, a spokesperson for the IDF, posted a video where he claimed that the IDF found weapons and technology belonging to Hamas and a document titled "Operation Al-Aqsa Flood" that contained a "list of terrorist names" and a schedule for agents guarding Israeli hostages under the Al-Rantisi Children's Hospital. A translation of the document showed that the Arabic words were a calendar of the days of the week.

The hospital basement and the nearby tunnel system were also shown to CNN journalist Nic Robertson. IDF said that forensic teams would begin investigations for evidence on the presence of hostages in the complex. The IDF also sent robots into tunnels to investigate the full length of the system. The Gaza Health Ministry and Gazan doctors denied the claims, stating that the basement complex was a shelter for hospital staff and refugees, while the tunnel shaft was an electrical wire assembly point.

In December, 2023, the IDF used explosives to destroy three tunnel access shafts located at or near Rantisi hospital, one of which had an elevator installed, and linked to a tunnel under the hospital.

== See also ==
- List of hospitals in the State of Palestine
