= Wolf Klaphake =

Wolf Klaphake (1900–1967) was a German-born scientist. He emigrated to Australia in 1935, where he was interred as an enemy alien from 1940 to 1944. He died in Sydney in 1967.

== Early life ==
Klaphake was born on 5 March 1900 in Zeitz, a small town in south-eastern Germany.

Klaphake's father, Josef Klaphake, was the director of the local abattoir; he died when Klaphake was just one year old. Klaphake, moved to Leipzig with his mother and his sister where he grew up. He was 2.03 metres (6.7 ft) tall, lean, with fair (later grey) hair and blue eyes. Most of the few surviving photographs depict an earnest-looking man.

After a brief period with an artillery regiment in Belgium, he returned to Leipzig to attend university. He obtained a doctorate in 1923 and moved to Berlin to work as a chemist.

== Life in Germany ==
Klaphake successfully worked as a chemist in Berlin during the 1920s and 30s. During this time, he was inspired by the works of Maimonides, a Sephardic Jew who wrote in Arabic about 1,000 years ago and who mentioned the use of water condensers or Air wells in Palestine. Kalphake went on to test several forms of air wells in Yugoslavia and on Vis Island in the Adriatic Sea.

Klaphake experimented with a very simple design: an area of mountain slope was cleared and smoothed with a watertight surface with a simple canopy supported by pillars or ridges. The sides of the structure were closed, but the top and bottom edges were left open. At nights, the mountain slope would cool and in the day moisture would collect on and run down the smoothed surface. Although the system apparently worked, it was expensive and Klaphake finally adopted a more compact design based on a masonry structure. This design was a sugarloaf-shaped building, about 15 metres (49 ft) high, with walls at least 2 metres (6 ft 7 in) thick, with holes on the top and at the bottom. The outer wall is made of concrete to give a high thermal capacity and the inner surface was made of a porous material such as sandstone. According to Klaphake:

The building produces water during the day and cools itself during the night; when the sun rises, the warm air is drawn through the upper holes into the building by the out-flowing cooler air, becomes cooled on the cold surface, deposits its water, which then oozes down and is collected somewhere underneath. It is wrong to think that this process works only on days with dew, as the inner surface becomes much cooler than one should expect. In Dalmatia, that day was a rare exception which failed to produce water.

Traces of Klaphake's condensers have been tentatively identified.

In 1933, the Nazi Party assumed power in the aftermath of decline of the Weimar Republic.

Klaphake was an individualist and quietly antagonistic towards the Nazi regime, but he kept his views to himself and he was not much troubled directly by the authorities. However, his wife Maria who was from Sweden was the subject of Nazi suspicion because she was a trained sexual psychologist who had been associated with an institute for sexual reform in Berlin. The Klaphakes' flat in Berlin was twice raided by the secret police. Maria was physically – and perhaps sexually – assaulted.

In 1935, Klaphake and his wife Maria emigrated to Australia, living at first in Melbourne and then moving to Sydney the following year. Klaphake worked first as a consultant chemist, and then for Industrial Microbiology Pty Ltd. This company was set up to fund Klaphake's research and then exploit the inventions he would make.

Klaphakes' decision to emigrate was probably primarily the result of Maria's encounters with the German secret police; their decision to settle in Australia (rather than, say, in Britain) was informed by Wolf's desire to develop a dew condenser. As a dry continent, Australia was likely to need alternative sources of fresh water and the Premier of South Australia, whom he had met in London, had expressed an interest. Klaphake made a specific proposal for a condenser at the small town of Cook where there was no supply of potable water. At Cook, the railway company had previously installed a large coal-powered active condenser, but it was prohibitively expensive to run, and it was cheaper to simply transport water. However, the Australian government turned down Klaphake's proposal and he lost interest in the project.

== Life in Australia ==
From 1940 to 1944, Klaphake was interned in the Orange, Tatura and Loveday camps. He considered his internment to be grossly unjust, but he remained in Australia and he applied for naturalisation soon after his release. He was naturalised in 1946.

After the war, Klaphake married his second wife Alice with whom he had two children.

Klaphake was a chemist by training, but also excelled in other branches of the natural sciences such as physics and botany. For a while he experimented with means of obtaining water from the atmosphere. He was a gifted linguist and a student of ancient Chinese cultures and religions.

== Legacy ==
Klaphake's life, particularly the story of his internment, was the subject of a radio play A doubtful character: Wolf Klaphake.
