= Air well (condenser) =

Building or device that collects water by condensing vapor

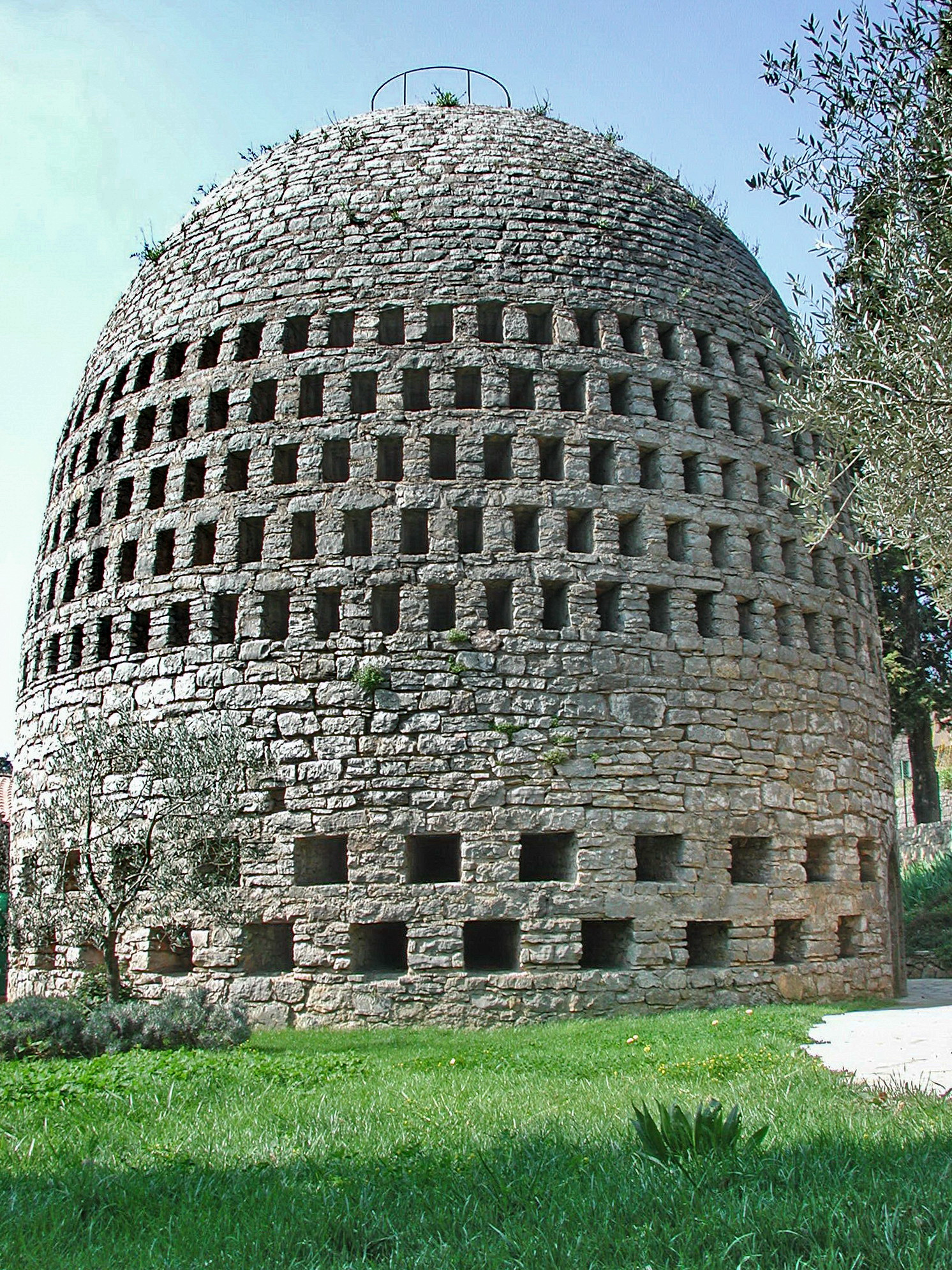
High-mass air well of Belgian engineer Achille Knapen in Trans-en-Provence.

An air well or aerial well is a structure or device that collects water by promoting the condensation of moisture from air. Designs for air wells are many and varied, but the simplest designs are completely passive, require no external energy source and have few, if any, moving parts.

Three principal designs are used for air wells, designated as high mass, radiative, and active:

- High-mass air wells: used in the early 20th century, but the approach failed.
- Low-mass, radiative collectors: Developed in the late 20th century onwards, proved to be much more successful.
- Active collectors: these collect water in the same way as a dehumidifier; although the designs work well, they require an energy source, making them uneconomical except in special circumstances. New designs seek to minimise the energy requirements of active condensers or make use of sustainable and renewable energy resources.

== Background ==
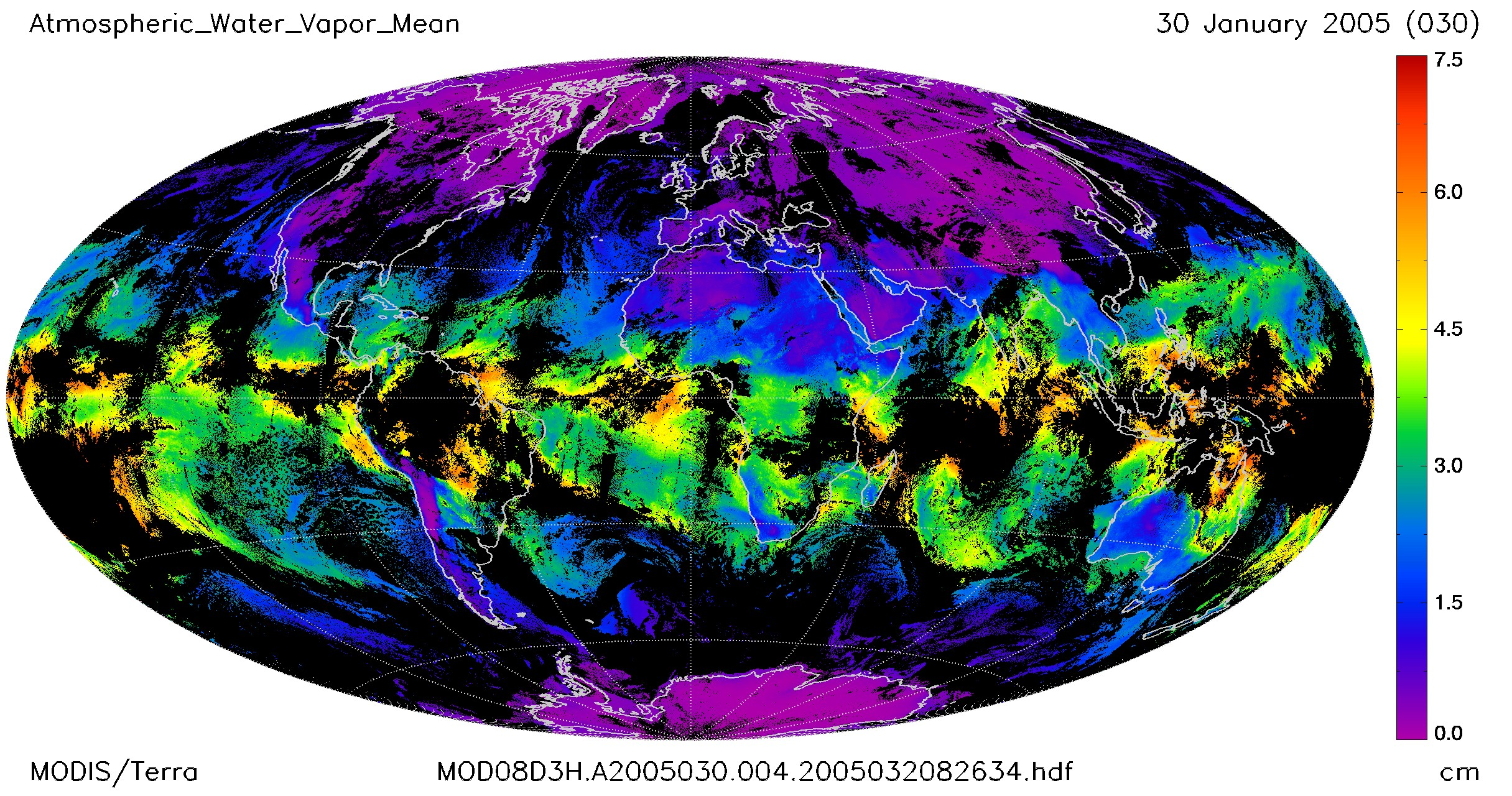
Global atmospheric water vapor for 30 January 2005. Northern hemisphere winter and southern hemisphere summer.

All air well designs incorporate a substrate with a temperature sufficiently low that dew forms. Dew is a form of precipitation that occurs naturally when atmospheric water vapour condenses onto a substrate. It is distinct from fog, in that fog is made of droplets of water that condense around particles in the air. Condensation releases latent heat which must be dissipated in order for water collection to continue.

An air well requires moisture from the air. Everywhere on Earth, even in deserts, the surrounding atmosphere contains at least some water. According to Beysens and Milimouk: "The atmosphere contains 12,900 cubic kilometres (3,100 cu mi) of fresh water, composed of 98 percent water vapour and 2 percent condensed water (clouds): a figure comparable to the renewable liquid water resources of inhabited lands (12,500 km^{3})." The quantity of water vapour contained within the air is commonly reported as a relative humidity, this depends on temperature, warmer air contains more water vapour than cooler air. When air is cooled to the dew point, it becomes saturated, and moisture will condense on a suitable surface. For instance, the dew point temperature of air at 20 °C (68 °F) and 80 percent relative humidity is 16 °C (61 °F). The dew point temperature falls to 9 °C (48 °F) if the relative humidity is 50 percent.

A related, but quite distinct, technique of obtaining atmospheric moisture is the fog fence.

An air well should not be confused with a dew pond. A dew pond is an artificial pond intended for watering livestock. The name dew pond (sometimes cloud pond or mist pond) derives from the widely held belief that the pond was filled by moisture from the air. In fact, dew ponds are primarily filled by rainwater.

A stone mulch can significantly increase crop yields in arid areas. This is most notably the case in the Canary Islands: on the island of Lanzarote there is about 140 millimetres (5.5 in) of rain each year and no permanent rivers. Despite this, substantial crops can be grown by using a mulch of volcanic stones, a trick discovered after volcanic eruptions in 1730. Some credit the stone mulch with promoting dew; although the idea has inspired some thinkers, it seems unlikely that the effect is significant. Rather, plants are able to absorb dew directly from their leaves, and the main benefit of a stone mulch is to reduce water loss from the soil and to eliminate competition from weeds.

== History ==
Beginning in the early 20th century, a number of inventors experimented with high-mass collectors. Notable investigators were the Russian engineer Friedrich Zibold (sometimes given as Friedrich Siebold), the French bioclimatologist Leon Chaptal, the German-Australian researcher Wolf Klaphake, and the Belgian inventor Achille Knapen.

=== Zibold's collector ===
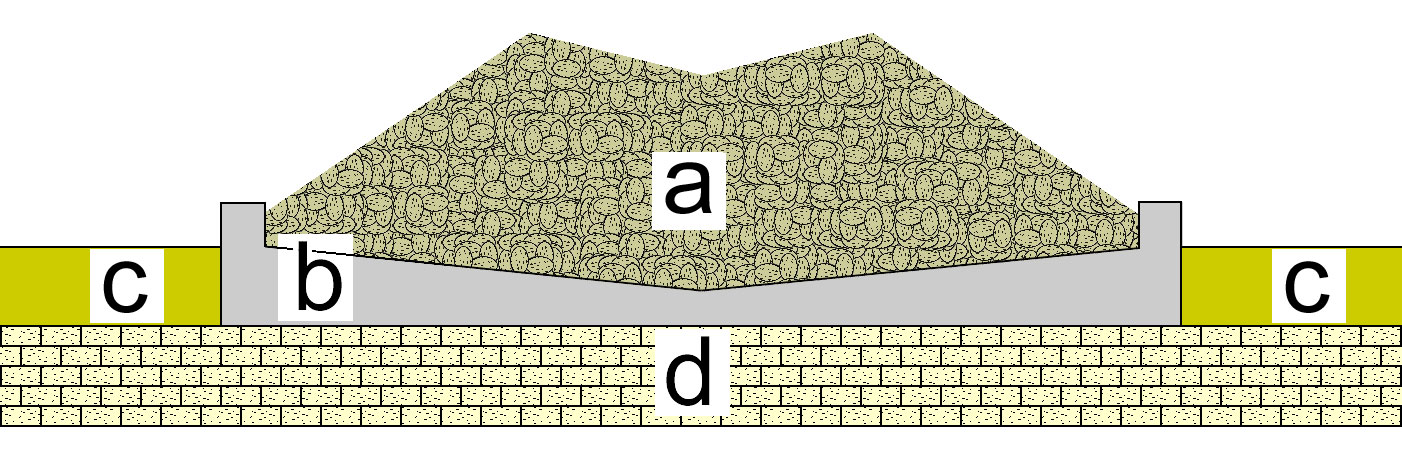
A section through Zibold's dew condenser. (a) is a truncated cone of beach pebbles 20 metres (66 ft) in diameter at the base and 8 metres (26 ft) in diameter at the top. (b) is a concrete bowl; a pipe (not shown) leads away from the base of the bowl to a collecting point. (c) is ground level and (d) is the natural limestone base.

In 1900, near the site of the ancient Byzantine city of Theodosia, thirteen large piles of stones were discovered by Zibold, who was a forester and engineer in charge of the area. Each stone pile covered just over 900 square metres (9,700 sq ft), and was about 10 metres (33 ft) tall. The finds were associated with the remains of 75-millimetre diameter (3.0 in) terracotta pipes that apparently led to wells and fountains in the city. Zibold concluded that the stacks of stone were condensers that supplied Theodosia with water and he calculated that each air well produced more than 55,400 litres (12,200 imp gal; 14,600 US gal) each day.

To verify his hypothesis, Zibold constructed a stone-pile condenser at an altitude of 288 metres (945 ft) on mount Tepe-Oba near the ancient site of Theodosia. Zibold's condenser was surrounded by a wall 1 metre (3 ft 3 in) high, 20 metres (66 ft) wide, around a bowl-shaped collection area with drainage. He used sea stones 10–40 centimetres (3.9–15.7 in) in diameter piled 6 metres (20 ft) high in a truncated cone that was 8 metres (26 ft) in diameter across the top. The shape of the stone pile allowed a good air flow with only minimal thermal contact between the stones.

Zibold's condenser began to operate in 1912 with a maximum daily production that was later estimated to have been 360 litres (79 imp gal; 95 US gal) – Zibold made no public record of his results at the time. The base developed leaks that forced the experiment to end in 1915 and the site was partially dismantled before being abandoned. (The site was rediscovered in 1993 and cleaned up.) Zibold's condenser was approximately the same size as the ancient stone piles that had been found, and although the yield was very much less than the yield Zibold had calculated for the original structures, the experiment was an inspiration for later developers.

=== Chaptal's collector ===
Inspired by Zibold's work, Chaptal built a small air well near Montpellier in 1929. Chaptal's condenser was a pyramidal concrete structure 3 metres (9.8 ft) square and 2.5 metres (8 ft 2 in) high, it was filled with 8 cubic metres (280 cu ft) of limestone pieces being about 7.5 centimetres (3.0 in) in diameter. Small vent holes ringed the top and bottom of the pyramid. These holes could be closed or opened as required to control the flow of air. The structure was allowed to cool during the night, and then warm moist air was let in during the day. Dew formed on the limestone pieces and collected in a reservoir below ground level. The amount of water obtained varied from 1 litre (0.22 imp gal; 0.26 US gal) to 2.5 litres (0.55 imp gal; 0.66 US gal) per day depending on the atmospheric conditions.

Chaptal did not consider his experiment a success. When he retired in 1946, he put the condenser out of order, possibly because he did not want to leave an improper installation to mislead those who might later continue studies on air wells.

=== Klaphake's collectors ===
Wolf Klaphake was a successful chemist working in Berlin during the 1920s and 1930s. During that time, he tested several forms of air wells in Yugoslavia and on Vis Island in the Adriatic Sea. Klaphake's work was inspired by Zibold and by the works of Maimonides, a known Jewish scholar who wrote in Arabic about 1,000 years ago and who mentioned the use of water condensers in Palestine.

Klaphake experimented with a very simple design: an area of mountain slope was cleared and smoothed with a watertight surface. It was shaded by a simple canopy supported by pillars or ridges. The sides of the structure were closed, but the top and bottom edges were left open. At night the mountain slope would cool, and in the day moisture would collect on and run down the smoothed surface. Although the system apparently worked, it was expensive, and Klaphake finally adopted a more compact design based on a masonry structure. This design was a sugarloaf-shaped building, about 15 metres (49 ft) high, with walls at least 2 metres (6 ft 7 in) thick, with holes on the top and at the bottom. The outer wall was made of concrete to give a high thermal capacity, and the inner surface was made of a porous material such as sandstone. According to Klaphake:

The building produces water during the day and cools itself during the night; when the sun rises, the warm air is drawn through the upper holes into the building by the out-flowing cooler air, becomes cooled on the cold surface, deposits its water, which then oozes down and is collected somewhere underneath. It is wrong to think that this process works only on days with dew, as the inner surface becomes much cooler than one should expect. In Dalmatia, that day was a rare exception which failed to produce water.

Traces of Klaphake's condensers have been tentatively identified.

In 1935, Wolf Klaphake and his wife Maria emigrated to Australia. The Klaphakes' decision to emigrate was probably primarily the result of Maria's encounters with Nazi authorities; their decision to settle in Australia (rather than, say, in Britain) was influenced by Wolf's desire to develop a dew condenser. As a dry continent, Australia was likely to need alternative sources of fresh water, and the Premier of South Australia, whom he had met in London, had expressed an interest. Klaphake made a specific proposal for a condenser at the small town of Cook, where there was no supply of potable water. At Cook, the railway company had previously installed a large coal-powered active condenser, but it was prohibitively expensive to run, and it was cheaper to simply transport water. However, the Australian government turned down Klaphake's proposal, and he lost interest in the project.

=== Knapen's aerial well ===
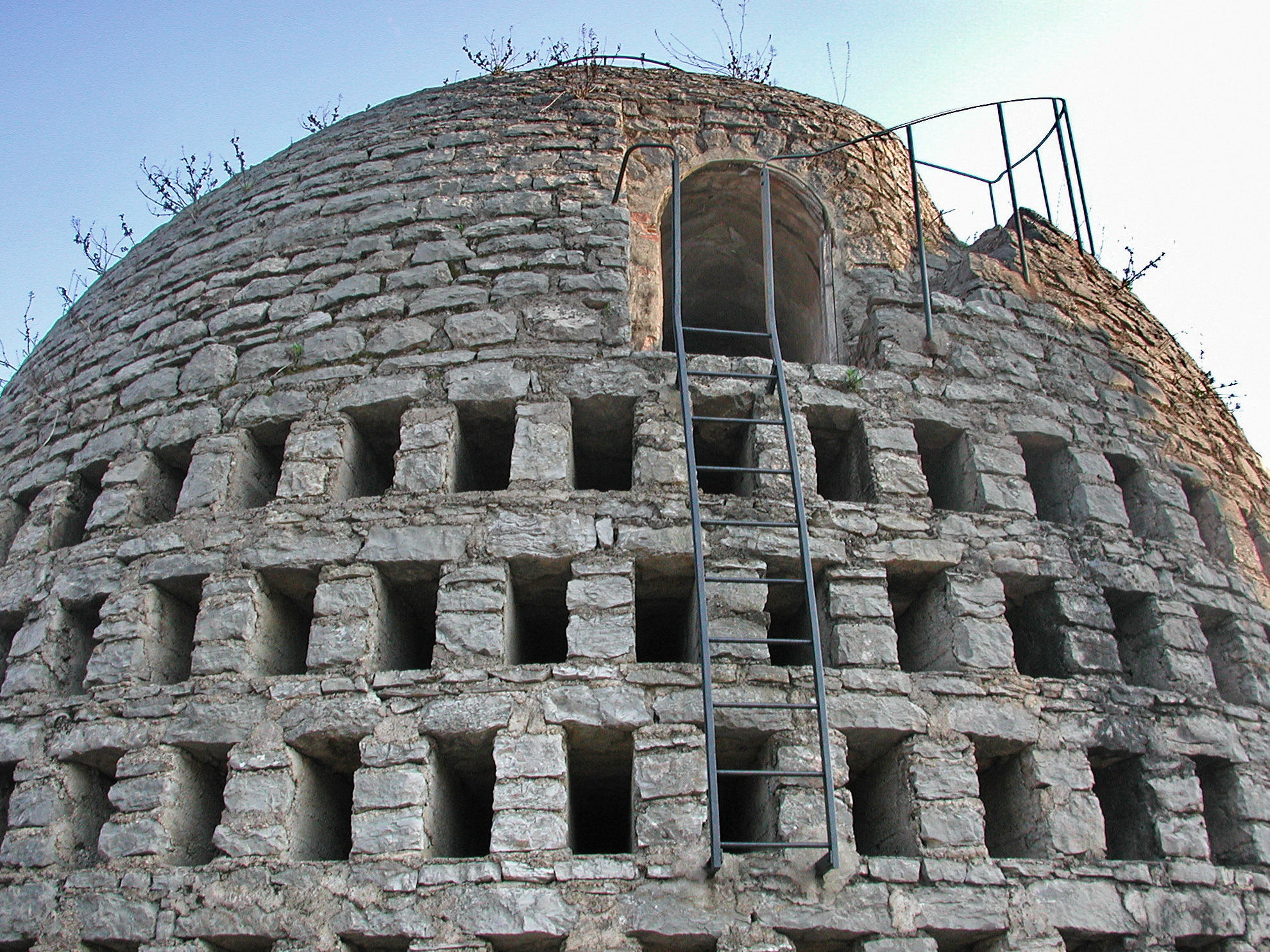
Exterior

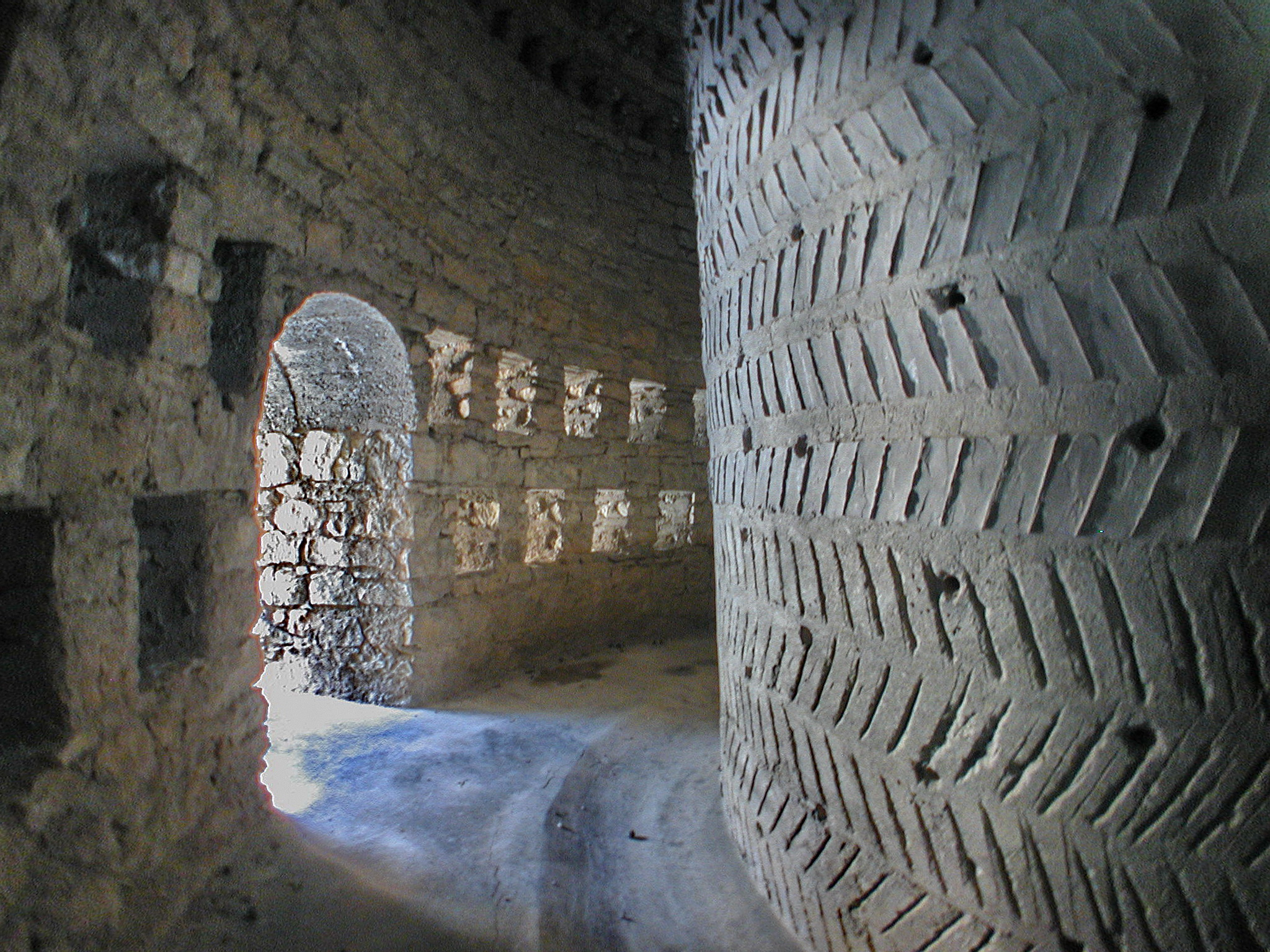
Interior.

Achille Knapen air well.

Knapen, who had previously worked on systems for removing moisture from buildings, was in turn inspired by Chaptal's work and he set about building an ambitiously large puits aerien (aerial well) on a 180 metres (590 ft) high hill at Trans-en-Provence in France. Beginning in 1930, Knapen's dew tower took 18 months to build; it still stands today, albeit in dilapidated condition. At the time of its construction, the condenser excited some public interest.

The tower is 14 metres (46 ft) high and has massive masonry walls about 3 metres (9.8 ft) thick with a number of apertures to let in air. Inside there is a massive column made of concrete. At night, the whole structure is allowed to cool, and during the day warm moist air enters the structure via the high apertures, cools, descends, and leaves the building by the lower apertures. Knapen's intention was that water should condense on the cool inner column. In keeping with Chaptal's finding that the condensing surface must be rough and the surface tension must be sufficiently low that the condensed water can drip, the central column's outer surface was studded with projecting plates of slate. The slates were placed nearly vertically to encourage dripping down to a collecting basin at the bottom of the structure. Unfortunately, the aerial well never achieved anything like its hoped-for performance and produced no more than a few litres of water each day.

=== International Organisation for Dew Utilization ===
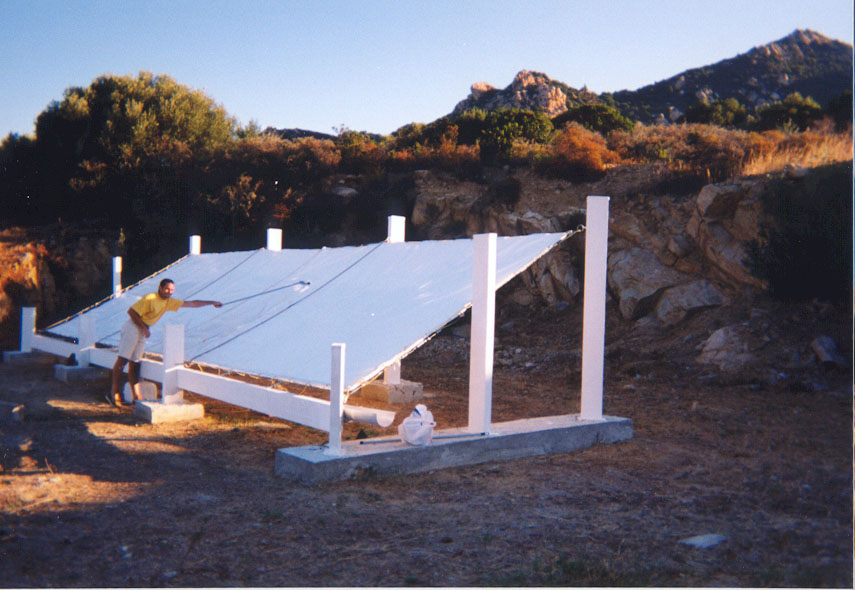
Big OPUR Dew Condenser in Corsica

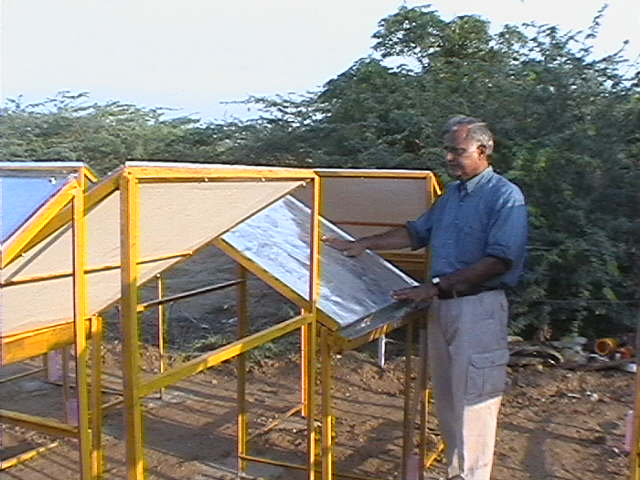
A radiative dew condenser test site at village Kothar in the north-west India near Arabian sea coast.

By the end of the twentieth century, the mechanics of how dew condenses were much better understood. The key insight was that low-mass collectors which rapidly lose heat by radiation perform best. A number of researchers worked on this method. In the early 1960s, dew condensers made from sheets of polyethylene supported on a simple frame resembling a ridge tent were used in Israel to irrigate plants. Saplings supplied with dew and very slight rainfall from these collectors survived much better than the control group planted without such aids – they all dried up over the summer. In 1986 in New Mexico condensers made of a special foil produced sufficient water to supply young saplings.

In 1992 a party of French academics attended a condensed matter conference in Ukraine where physicist Daniel Beysens introduced them to the story of how ancient Theodosia was supplied with water from dew condensers. They were sufficiently intrigued that in 1993 they went to see for themselves. They concluded that the mounds that Zibold identified as dew condensers were in fact ancient burial mounds (a part of the necropolis of ancient Theodosia) and that the pipes were medieval in origin and not associated with the construction of the mounds. They found the remains of Zibold's condenser, which they tidied up and examined closely. Zibold's condenser had apparently performed reasonably well, but in fact his exact results are not at all clear, and it is possible that the collector was intercepting fog, which added significantly to the yield. If Zibold's condenser worked at all, this was probably due to fact that a few stones near the surface of the mound were able to lose heat at night while being thermally isolated from the ground; however, it could never have produced the yield that Zibold envisaged.

Fired with enthusiasm, the party returned to France and set up the International Organisation for Dew Utilization (OPUR), with the specific objective of making dew available as an alternative source of water.

OPUR began a study of dew condensation under laboratory conditions; they developed a special hydrophobic film and experimented with trial installations, including a 30 square metres (320 sq ft) collector in Corsica. Vital insights included the idea that the mass of the condensing surface should be as low as possible so that it cannot easily retain heat, that it should be protected from unwanted thermal radiation by a layer of insulation, and that it should be hydrophobic, so as to shed condensed moisture readily.

By the time they were ready for their first practical installation, they heard that one of their members, Girja Sharan, had obtained a grant to construct a dew condenser in Kothara, India. In April 2001, Sharan had incidentally noticed substantial condensation on the roof of a cottage at Toran Beach Resort in the arid coastal region of Kutch, where he was briefly staying. The following year, he investigated the phenomenon more closely and interviewed local people. Financed by the Gujarat Energy Development Agency and the World Bank, Sharan and his team went on to develop passive, radiative condensers for use in the arid coastal region of Kutch. Active commercialisation began in 2006.

Sharan tested a wide range of materials and got good results from galvanised iron and aluminium sheets, but found that sheets of the special plastic developed by the OPUR just 400 micrometres (0.016 in) thick generally worked even better than the metal sheets and were less expensive. The plastic film, known as OPUR foil, is hydrophilic and is made from polyethylene mixed with titanium dioxide and barium sulphate.

== Types ==
There are three principal approaches to the design of the heat sinks that collect the moisture in air wells: high mass, radiative, and active. Early in the twentieth century, there was interest in high-mass air wells, but despite much experimentation including the construction of massive structures, this approach proved to be a failure.

From the late twentieth century onwards, there has been much investigation of low-mass, radiative collectors; these have proved to be much more successful.

=== High-mass ===
The high-mass air well design attempts to cool a large mass of masonry with cool nighttime air entering the structure due to breezes or natural convection. In the day, the warmth of the sun results in increased atmospheric humidity. When moist daytime air enters the air well, it condenses on the presumably cool masonry. None of the high-mass collectors performed well, Knapen's aerial well being a particularly conspicuous example.

The problem with the high-mass collectors was that they could not get rid of sufficient heat during the night – despite design features intended to ensure that this would happen. While some thinkers have believed that Zibold might have been correct after all, an article in Journal of Arid Environments discusses why high-mass condenser designs of this type cannot yield useful amounts of water:

We would like to stress the following point. To obtain condensation, the condenser temperature of the stones must be lower than the dew point temperature. When there is no fog, the dew point temperature is always lower than the air temperature. Meteorological data shows that the dew point temperature (an indicator of the water content of the air) does not change appreciably when the weather is stable. Thus wind, which ultimately imposes air temperature to the condenser, cannot cool the condenser to ensure its functioning. Another cooling phenomenon — radiative cooling — must operate. It is therefore at night-time, when the condenser cools by radiation, that liquid water can be extracted from air. It is very rare that the dew point temperature would increase significantly so as to exceed the stone temperature inside the stone heap. Occasionally, when this does happen, dew can be abundant during a short period of time. This is why subsequent attempts by L. Chaptal and A. Knapen to build massive dew condensers only rarely resulted in significant yields. [Emphasis as in original]

Although ancient air wells are mentioned in some sources, there is scant evidence for them, and persistent belief in their existence has the character of a modern myth.

=== Radiative ===
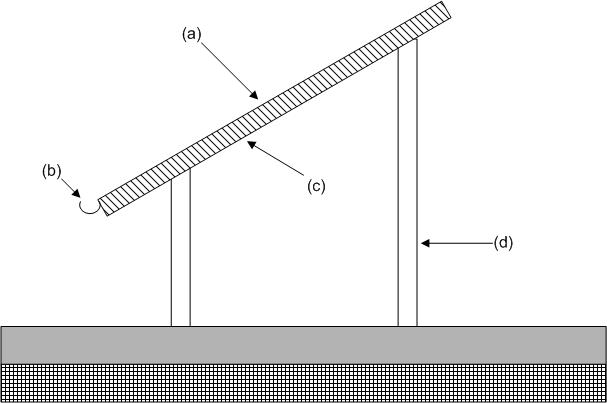
Diagram of a radiative collector. (a) radiating/condensing surface, (b) collecting gutter, (c) backing insulation, (d) stand.

A radiative air well is designed to cool a substrate by radiating heat to the night sky. The substrate has a low mass so that it cannot hold onto heat, and it is thermally isolated from any mass, including the ground. A typical radiative collector presents a condensing surface at an angle of 30° from the horizontal. The condensing surface is backed by a thick layer of insulating material such as polystyrene foam and supported 2–3 metres (7–10 ft) above ground level. Such condensers may be conveniently installed on the ridge roofs of low buildings or supported by a simple frame. Although other heights do not typically work quite so well, it may be less expensive or more convenient to mount a collector near to ground level or on a two-story building.

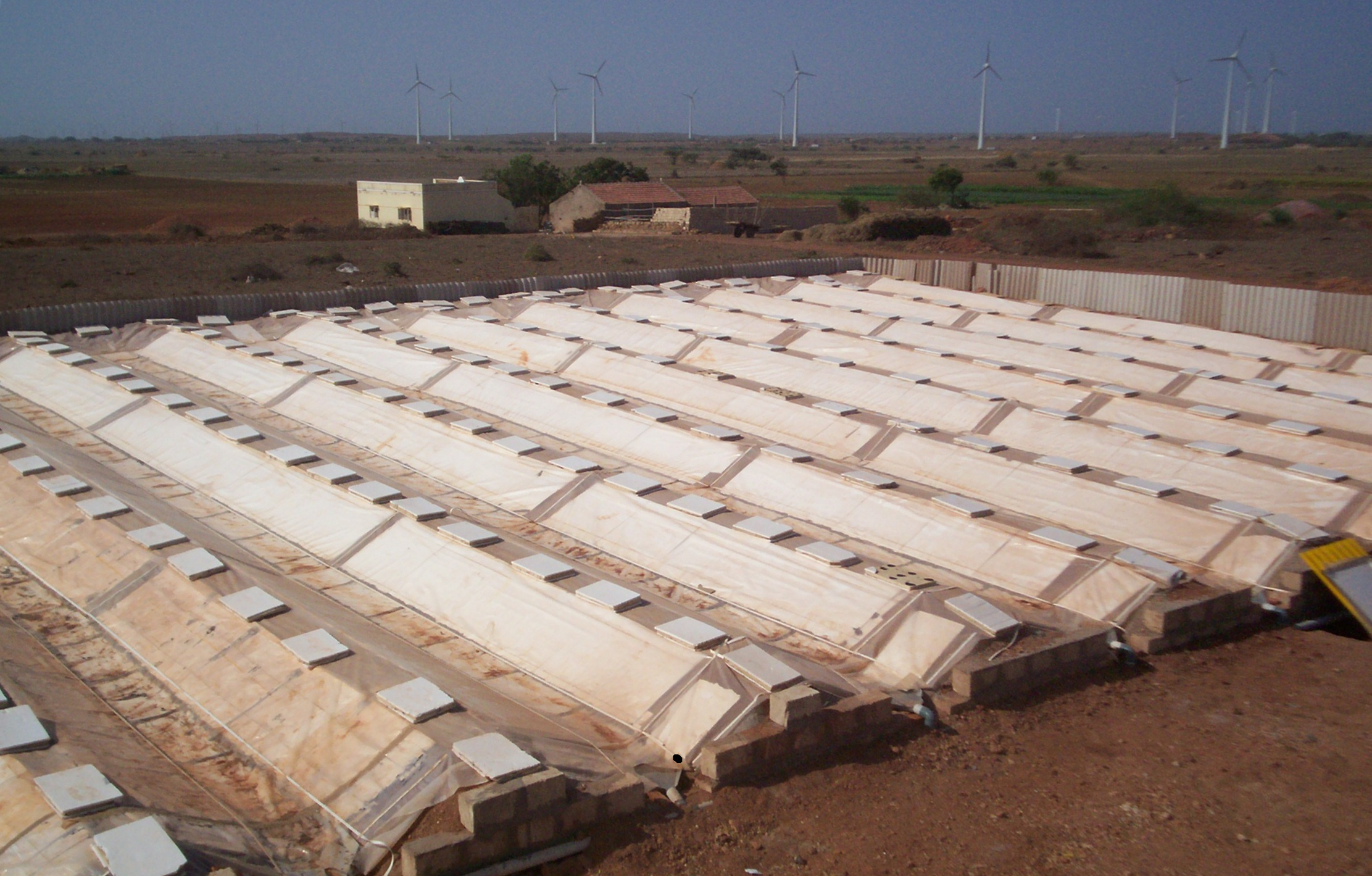
A 550 m^{2} (660 sq yd) radiative condenser in northwest India.

A 550 square metres (5,900 sq ft) radiative condenser illustrated to the left is built near the ground. In the area of northwest India where it is installed dew occurs for 8 months a year, and the installation collects about 15 millimetres (0.59 in) of dew water over the season with nearly 100 dew-nights. In a year it provides a total of about 9,000 litres (2,000 imp gal; 2,400 US gal) of potable water for the school which owns and operates the site.

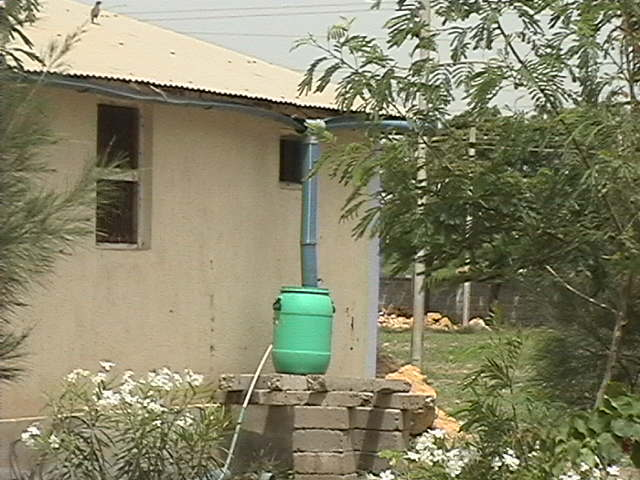
Structures with metal roofing, such as this one, can be used to harvest dew water simply by adding gutters and, for increased output, a layer of insulation underside. Without the insulation the output is nearly half of that from plastic condensers.

Although flat designs have the benefit of simplicity, other designs such as inverted pyramids and cones can be significantly more effective. This is probably because the designs shield the condensing surfaces from unwanted heat radiated by the lower atmosphere, and, being symmetrical, they are not sensitive to wind direction.

New materials may make even better collectors. One such material is inspired by the Namib Desert beetle, which survives only on the moisture it extracts from the atmosphere. It has been found that its back is coated with microscopic projections: the peaks are hydrophilic and the troughs are hydrophobic. Researchers at the Massachusetts Institute of Technology have emulated this capability by creating a textured surface that combines alternating hydrophobic and hydrophilic materials.

=== Active ===
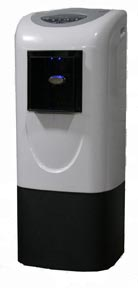
A commercial atmospheric water generator intended for residential use.

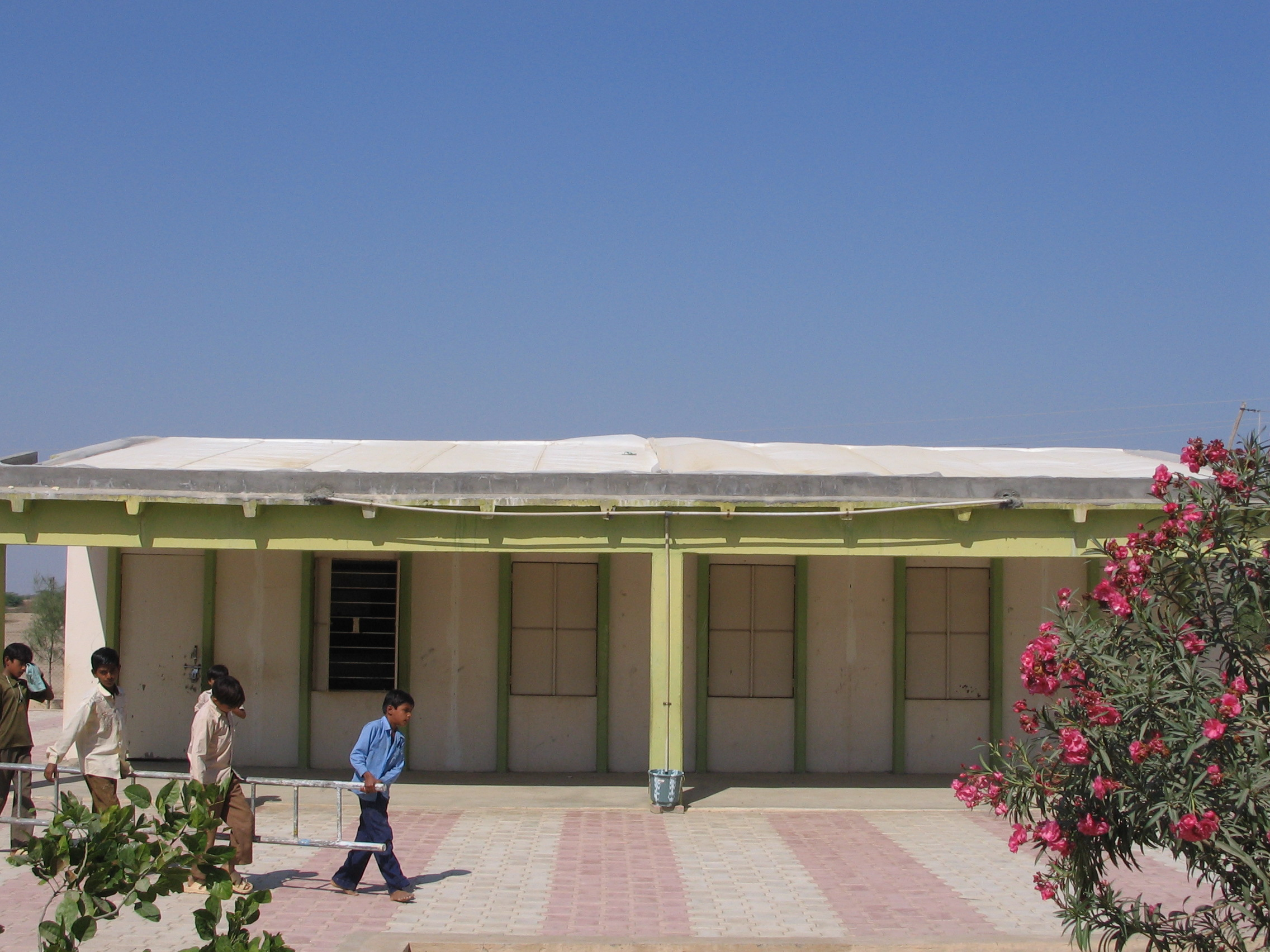
An example of a condenser-on-roof installation, condenser made of plastic film with special properties, with insulation layer between film and concrete roof surface. This installation is on school buildings at Sayara (Kutch, India). Unlike metal roofs, concrete roofs do not attract condensation without any treatment, hence the need for an external condenser. The output from such condensers is nearly two times higher than from a bare metal roof, all else remaining constant.

Active atmospheric water collectors have been in use since the commercialisation of mechanical refrigeration. Essentially, all that is required is to cool a heat exchanger below the dew point, and water will be produced. Such water production may take place as a by-product, possibly unwanted, of dehumidification. The air conditioning system of the Burj Khalifa in Dubai, for example, produces an estimated 15 million US gallons (57,000 m^{3}) of water each year that is used for irrigating the tower's landscape plantings.

Because mechanical refrigeration is energy intensive, active collectors are typically restricted to places where there is no supply of water that can be desalinated or purified at a lower cost and that are sufficiently far from a supply of fresh water to make transport uneconomical. Such circumstances are uncommon, and even then large installations such as that tried in the 1930s at Cook, South Australia failed because of the cost of running the installation – it was cheaper to transport water over large distances.

In the case of small installations, convenience may outweigh cost. There is a wide range of small machines designed to be used in offices that produce a few litres of drinking water from the atmosphere. However, there are circumstances where there really is no source of water other than the atmosphere. For example, in the 1930s, American designers added condenser systems to airships – in this case the air was that emitted by the exhaust of the engines, and so it contained additional water as a product of combustion. The moisture was collected and used as additional ballast to compensate for the loss of weight as fuel was consumed. By collecting ballast in this way, the airship's buoyancy could be kept relatively constant without having to release helium gas, which was both expensive and in limited supply.

More recently, on the International Space Station, the Zvezda module includes a humidity control system. The water it collects is usually used to supply the Elektron system that electrolyses water into hydrogen and oxygen, but it can be used for drinking in an emergency.

There are a number of designs that minimise the energy requirements of active condensers:

- One method is to use the ground as a heat sink by drawing air through underground pipes. This is often done to provide a source of cool air for a building by means of a ground-coupled heat exchanger (also known as Earth tubes), wherein condensation is typically regarded as a significant problem. A major problem with such designs is that the underground tubes are subject to contamination and difficult to keep clean. Designs of this type require air to be drawn through the pipes by a fan, but the power required may be provided (or supplemented) by a wind turbine.
- Cold seawater is used in the Seawater Greenhouse to both cool and humidify the interior of greenhouse-like structure. The cooling can be so effective that not only do the plants inside benefit from reduced transpiration, but dew collects on the outside of the structure and can easily be collected by gutters.
- Another type of atmospheric water collector makes use of desiccants which adsorb atmospheric water at ambient temperature, this makes it possible to extract moisture even when the relative humidity is as low as 14 percent. Systems of this sort have proved to be very useful as emergency supplies of safe drinking water. For regeneration, the desiccant needs to be heated. In some designs regeneration energy is supplied by the sun; air is ventilated at night over a bed of desiccants that adsorb the water vapour. During the day, the premises are closed, the greenhouse effect increases the temperature, and, as in solar desalination pools, the water vapour is partially desorbed, condenses on a cold part and is collected. Nanotechnology is improving these types of collectors, as well. One such adsorption-based device collected 0.25 L of water per kg of a metal-organic framework in an exceptionally arid climate with sub-zero dew points (Tempe, Arizona, USA).
- A French company has recently designed a small wind turbine that uses a 30 kW electric generator to power an onboard mechanical refrigeration system to condense water.

== See also ==
- Atmospheric water generator
- Condensation trap (Solar still)
- Dew pond
- Fog collection
- Fog drip
- Groasis Waterboxx
- Passive cooling, including fluorescent cooling, which can cool to below the ambient air temperature
- Rainwater harvesting
- Solar chimney
- Water potential
- Watermaker
