= Building-integrated fog collectors =

Integration of fog-harvesting systems into building envelopes

Building-integrated fog collectors (BIFCs) are systems that incorporate fog-harvesting functions into architectural elements such as façades, roofs, or shading devices. Unlike freestanding large fog collectors (LFCs) deployed in open terrain, BIFCs aim to capture airborne water droplets directly on the external skin of buildings. In this way, building envelopes perform a dual function: they provide protection from weather and climate while simultaneously acting as devices for collecting water. BIFCs belong to a broader class of building-integrated environmental technologies that seek multifunctional envelopes.

== Concept and terminology ==
The systematic consideration of building envelopes as potential fog-harvesting devices was introduced by Caldas et al. (2018), who proposed that ventilated double-skin façades could be designed to intercept airborne droplets and channel water into reservoirs. In a follow-up study, the same authors reported experiments with radiative condensers—surfaces that cool below ambient temperature at night to induce condensation—as complementary elements of water-harvesting façades. Expanding on this research, Di Bitonto, Kutlu and Zanelli (2023) developed the concept of smart façades, describing modular textile meshes that could provide both fog harvesting and shading functions.

== Operating principle ==
Fog collection generally proceeds through three stages: the interception of suspended droplets by a mesh or textured surface, the coalescence of these droplets into larger drops, and the downward drainage of liquid water into storage. The efficiency of this process depends on both aerodynamic and material factors. Numerical simulations demonstrate that collector geometry, porosity, and orientation influence aerodynamic collection efficiency (ACE) by altering how air and droplets flow around the surface, while surface chemistry is equally important: laboratory experiments with Janus meshes, composed of alternating hydrophilic and hydrophobic strips, indicate improved drainage and resistance to clogging compared with uniform meshes, although long-term outdoor durability remains untested.

In more intuitive terms, the process works like this: as fog-laden air encounters the mesh or textured surface built into the building, tiny water droplets in the air are caught (capture). These droplets collect and grow on the surface by merging with others (coalescence), forming larger drops that overcome adhesion forces. Once large enough, gravity causes them to run off into channels or troughs built into the façade or roofing system (collection). The choice of materials (how water-attracting or water-repelling the surface is), the geometry of the mesh (its porosity, thickness, pattern), the angle and spacing away from the wall, and how they handle wind flow all strongly influence how much water you get. Designs that let air flow smoothly without turbulence in front of the mesh, and let water drain quickly, tend to be much more effective.

== Historical development ==
The use of fog as a freshwater resource predates building integration. Large fog collectors employing Raschel meshes have long been used in arid coastal deserts, particularly in Chile, where Cereceda, Schemenauer and Suit (1992) reported their contribution as an alternative water supply for rural communities. In the architectural field, Suau (2010) discussed fog collection as part of sustainable design along the Atacama Coast. A more systematic framework for integration at the building scale was outlined by Caldas et al. (2018), who emphasized double-skin façades as potential fog-harvesting envelopes. Subsequent innovations have included kirigami-inspired collectors, which employ cut-and-fold patterns to generate vortices that increase droplet deposition. Li et al. (2021) demonstrated laboratory yields of 18–24 L·m⁻²·h⁻¹ at wind speeds of 0.8–2.4 m/s and reported that a one-square-metre module produced 3.51 kg of water per hour in outdoor humidifier tests, although these results cannot be directly equated with natural fog conditions.

== Typologies and design strategies ==
Several approaches to BIFC design have been documented in the literature. Fixed mesh screens can be attached to façades to provide shading while capturing droplets, while ventilated double-skin façades employ an external collecting layer separated from the structural wall. Di Bitonto et al. (2023) proposed smart façade concepts integrating modular textile panels that combine fog water harvesting with additional environmental benefits, such as shading and potential air purification when combined with vegetation. Some design proposals mention potential for integrating fog-harvesting meshes with adjustable or movable shading devices, but published literature has not yet documented such implementations. Recent studies extend the concept toward so-called “green–blue façades”: Dhaouadi and Abdelrahman (2024) examined the incorporation of fog-harvesting meshes into living green walls, proposing that the collected water could sustain vegetation while simultaneously improving air quality and thermal comfort in urban contexts. Hybrid approaches have also been explored: Alazzam et al. (2024) investigated the dual use of photovoltaic panels for both energy generation and water harvesting from fog and rain.

== Key performance factors ==
The performance of fog-harvesting systems depends primarily on meteorological conditions such as wind speed, fog frequency, and liquid water content. At the design level, collector geometry and orientation strongly affect aerodynamic efficiency, as demonstrated by three-dimensional simulations of airflow and droplet motion. Material properties also play a role: Janus and other wettability-patterned meshes have been shown to promote faster droplet removal in laboratory studies. Reviews emphasize that site-specific climate conditions and integration strategies must be carefully considered. Brambilla et al. (2022) concluded that façade-integrated atmospheric water harvesting technologies remain largely experimental, facing uncertainties related to weathering, cost, and maintenance when scaled to building envelopes.

== Applications ==
Applications of BIFCs are generally directed toward non-potable water uses, including irrigation, toilet flushing, and cleaning. Traditional LFC projects in Chile demonstrated that fog collection can supplement community water supply in regions without reliable alternatives. At the building scale, Di Bitonto et al. (2023) proposed that smart façades could contribute water for green roofs or courtyards, improving resilience in Mediterranean climates. Similarly, Dhaouadi and Abdelrahman (2024) argued that green façades equipped with fog-harvesting components could become partially self-sufficient, reducing irrigation demand while contributing environmental co-benefits such as cooling and noise reduction. Suau (2010) discussed fog collection as a design response within the ecological context of the Atacama Desert.

== Advantages and challenges ==
The potential advantages of BIFCs lie in their multifunctionality: a single building envelope can provide shading, aesthetic value, and supplementary water. Reviews note that façade integration is conceptually possible with lightweight meshes, but case-specific structural and maintenance considerations remain significant. Integration with other envelope systems, such as green walls or photovoltaic panels, suggests additional synergies. Challenges remain significant. Yields are strongly climate-dependent and fluctuate with seasonal fog availability, durability under fog–salt–dust exposure is poorly documented, and only limited long-term façade-scale trials have been reported. Lummerich and Tiedemann (2011) also noted that fog water harvesting remains only marginally competitive economically, and integration into building envelopes may increase costs further. For these reasons, BIFCs are widely discussed as promising but still-emerging technologies requiring further experimental validation.

== See also ==
- Fog collection
- Atmospheric water generator
- Building-integrated photovoltaics
- Green wall
