= Condensation =

Change of state of matter from a gas phase into a liquid phase

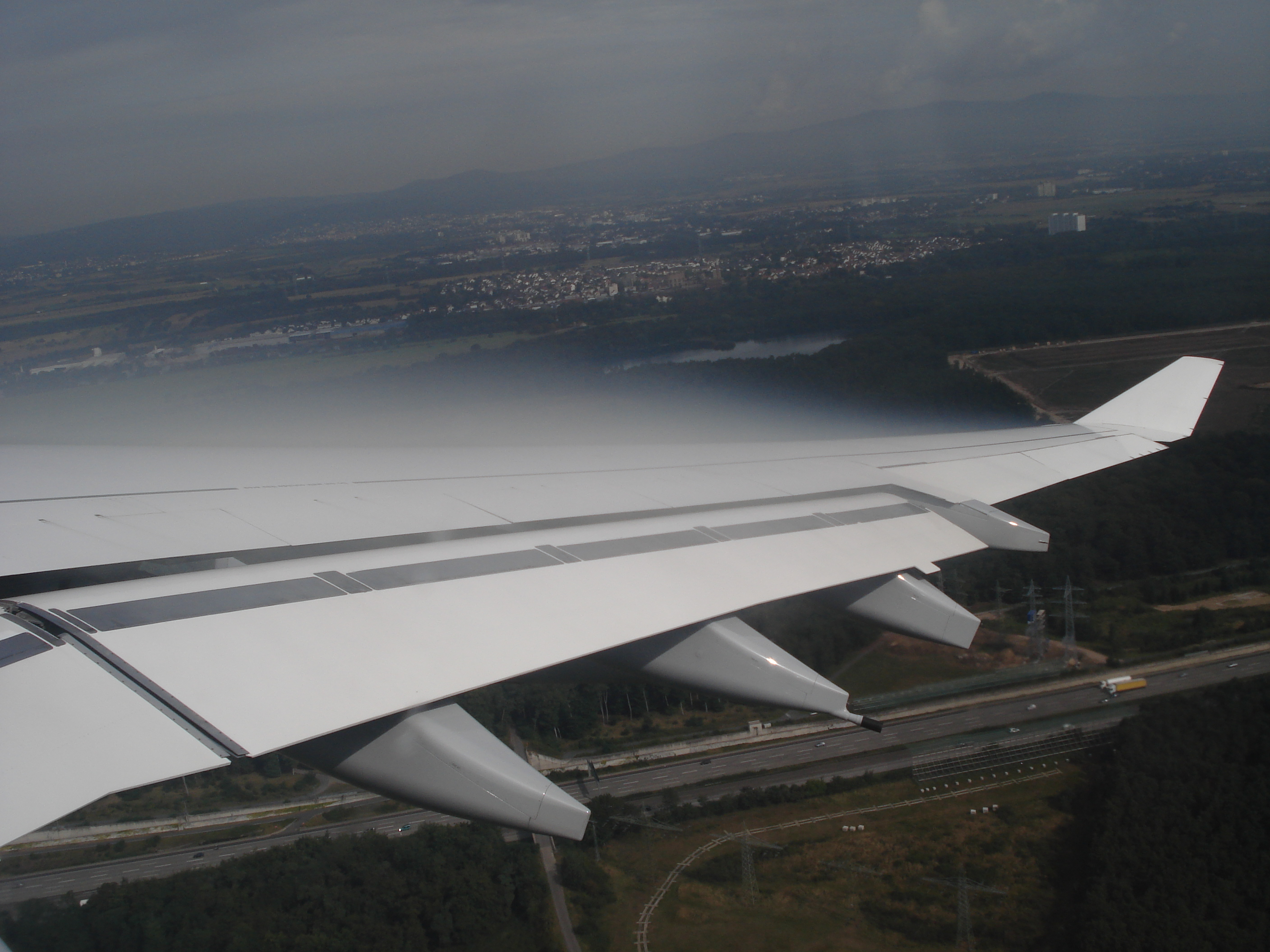
Condensation forming in the low pressure zone above the wing of an aircraft during landing due to adiabatic expansion

Condensation is the change of the state of matter from the gas phase into the liquid phase, and is the reverse of vaporization. The word most often refers to the water cycle. It can also be defined as the change in the state of water vapor to liquid water when in contact with a liquid or solid surface or cloud condensation nuclei within the atmosphere. When the transition happens from the gaseous phase into the solid phase directly, the change is called deposition. Condensation is usually associated with water.

== Initiation ==
Condensation is initiated by the formation of atomic/molecular clusters of that species within its gaseous volume—like rain drop or snow flake formation within clouds—or at the contact between such gaseous phase and a liquid or solid surface. In clouds, this can be catalyzed by water-nucleating proteins, produced by atmospheric microbes, which are capable of binding gaseous or liquid water molecules.

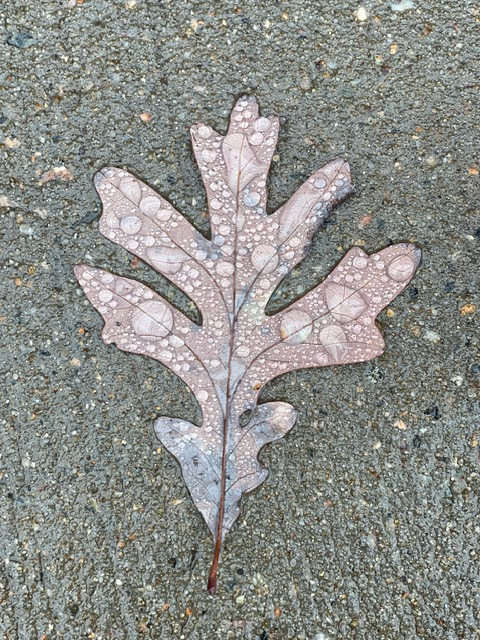
Photograph of water condensation on white oak leaf.

== Reversibility scenarios ==
A few distinct reversibility scenarios emerge here with respect to the nature of the surface.

- absorption into the surface of a liquid (either of the same substance or one of its solvents)—is reversible as evaporation.
- adsorption (as dew droplets) onto solid surface at pressures and temperatures higher than the species' triple point—also reversible as evaporation.
- adsorption onto solid surface (as supplemental layers of solid) at pressures and temperatures lower than the species' triple point—is reversible as sublimation.

== Most common scenarios ==
Condensation commonly occurs when a vapor is cooled and/or compressed to its saturation limit when the molecular density in the gas phase reaches its maximal threshold. Vapor cooling and compressing equipment that collects condensed liquids is called a "condenser".

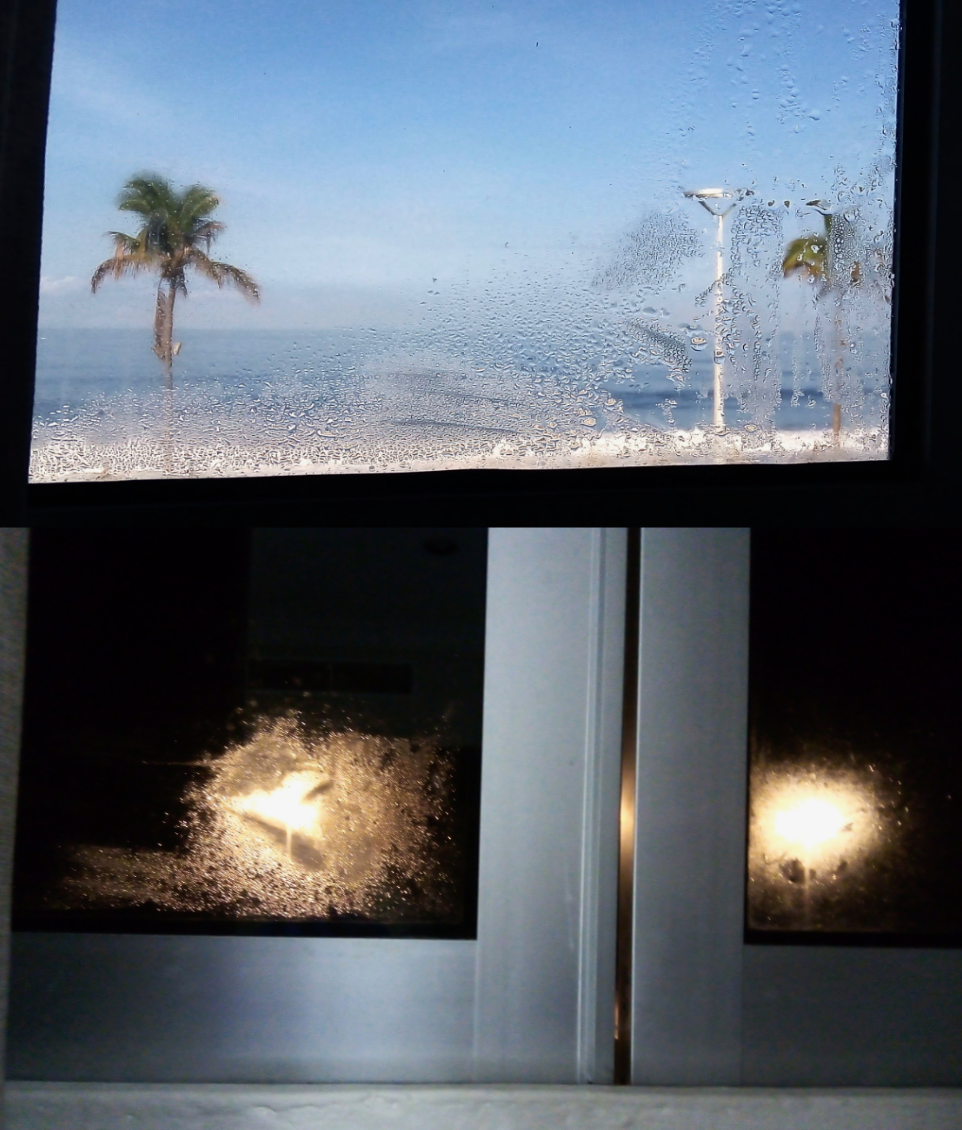
Condensation on the outside of a window, due to it being in front of the sea which regularly produces moist sea spray.

== Measurement ==
Psychrometry measures the rates of condensation through evaporation into the air moisture at various atmospheric pressures and temperatures. Water is the product of its vapor condensation—condensation is the process of such phase conversion.

== Applications of condensation ==
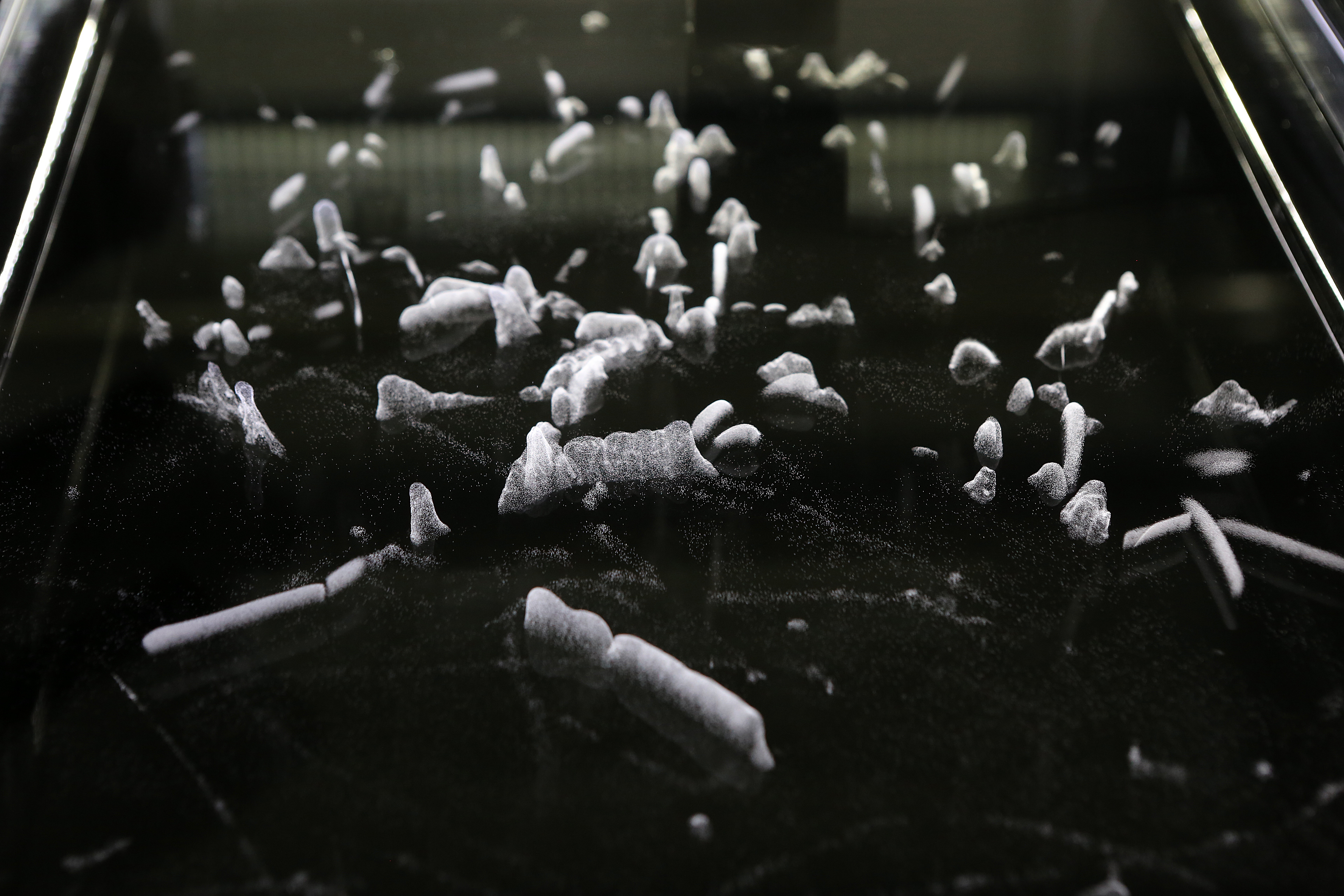
In cloud chambers a liquid (sometimes water, but usually isopropanol) condenses upon contact with a particle of radiation thus producing an effect similar to contrails

Condensation is a crucial component of distillation, an important laboratory and industrial chemistry application.

Because condensation is a naturally occurring phenomenon, it can often be used to generate water in large quantities for human use. Many structures are made solely for the purpose of collecting water from condensation, such as air wells and fog fences. Such systems can often be used to retain soil moisture in areas where active desertification is occurring—so much so that some organizations educate people living in affected areas about water condensers to help them deal effectively with the situation.

It is also a crucial process in forming particle tracks in a cloud chamber. In this case, ions produced by an incident particle act as nucleation centers for the condensation of the vapor producing the visible "cloud" trails.

Commercial applications of condensation, by consumers as well as industry, include power generation, water desalination, thermal management, refrigeration, and air conditioning.

== Biological adaptation ==
Numerous living beings use water made accessible by condensation. A few examples of these are the Australian thorny devil, the darkling beetles of the Namibian coast, and the coast redwoods of the West Coast of the United States.

== Condensation in building construction ==
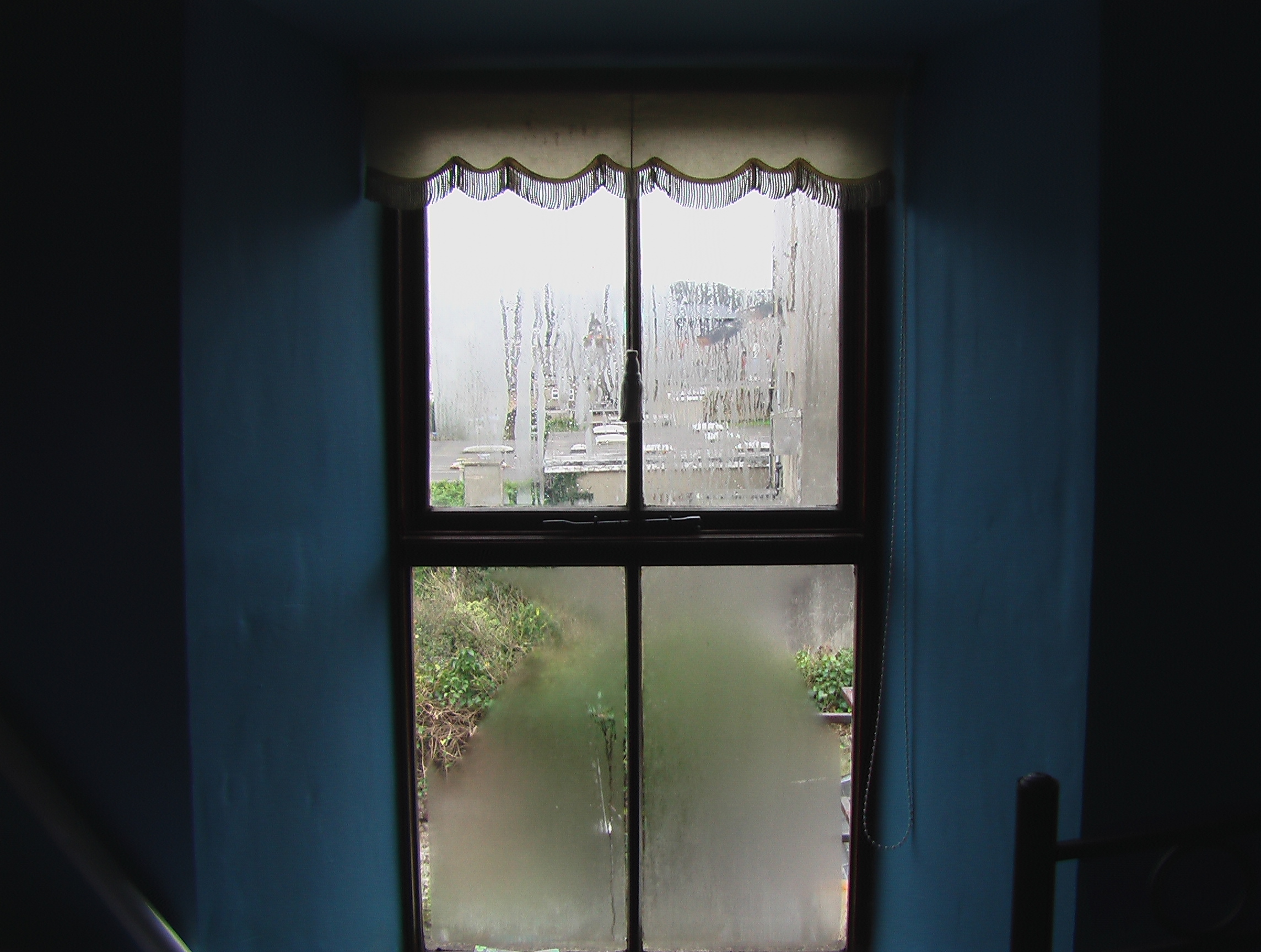
Condensation on a window during a rain shower.

Condensation in building construction is an unwanted phenomenon as it may cause dampness, mold health issues, wood rot, corrosion, weakening of mortar and masonry walls, and energy penalties due to increased heat transfer. To alleviate these issues, the indoor air humidity needs to be lowered, or air ventilation in the building needs to be improved. This can be done in a number of ways, for example opening windows, turning on extractor fans, using dehumidifiers, drying clothes outside and covering pots and pans whilst cooking. Air conditioning or ventilation systems can be installed that help remove moisture from the air, and move air throughout a building. The amount of water vapor that can be stored in the air can be increased simply by increasing the temperature. However, this can be a double edged sword as most condensation in the home occurs when warm, moisture heavy air comes into contact with a cool surface. As the air is cooled, it can no longer hold as much water vapor. This leads to deposition of water on the cool surface. This is very apparent when central heating is used in combination with single glazed windows in winter.

Interstructure condensation may be caused by thermal bridges, insufficient or lacking insulation, damp proofing or insulated glazing.

== Table ==
Phase transitions of matter
| To From | Solid | Liquid | Gas | Plasma |
|---|---|---|---|---|
| Solid | | Melting | Sublimation | ablation |
| Liquid | Freezing | | Vaporization | |
| Gas | Deposition | Condensation | | Ionization |
| Plasma | | | Recombination | |

== See also ==
- Air well (condenser)
- Bose–Einstein condensate
- Cloud physics
- Condenser (heat transfer)
- DNA condensation
- Dropwise condensation
- Groasis Waterboxx
- Kelvin equation
- Liquefaction of gases
- Phase diagram
- Phase transition
- Retrograde condensation
- Surface condenser
