= Trans-en-Provence case =

1981 UFO sighting in France

In the Trans-en-Provence case, an unidentified flying object is claimed to have left physical evidence in the form of burnt residue on a field. The event took place on 8 January 1981, outside the town of Trans-en-Provence in the French department of Var. It was described in Popular Mechanics as "perhaps the most completely and carefully documented sighting of all time."

== Renato Nicolaï account ==
The case began on 8 January 1981 at 5 p.m. Renato Nicolaï, a 55-year-old farmer, heard a strange whistling sound while performing agricultural work on his property. He then saw a saucer-shaped object about 2.5 m (8 ft) in diameter land about 50 m (160 ft) away at a lower elevation.

According to the witness,

The device had the shape of two saucers, one inverted on top of the other. It must have measured about 1.5 metres in height. It was the color of lead. This device had a ridge all the way around its circumference. Under the machine I saw two kinds of pieces as it was lifting off. They could be reactors or feet. There were also two other circles which looked like trapdoors. The two reactors, or feet, extended about 20 cm (8 in) below the body of the machine.

Nicolaï claimed the object took off almost immediately, rising above the treeline and departing to the northeast. It left burn marks on the ground where it had supposedly sat.

Nicolaï notified the local gendarmerie the following day. They interviewed him, photographed the scene, and collected soil and plant samples from the field. The case was later sent to GEPAN (Groupe d'Étude des Phénomènes Aérospatiaux Non-identifiés) for review.

== Analysis of evidence ==
GEPAN analysis noted that the ground had been compressed by a mechanical pressure of about 4 or 5 tons, and heated to between 300 and 600 °C (572 and 1,112 °F). Trace amounts of phosphate and zinc were found in the sample material, and analysis of resident alfalfa near the landing site showed chlorophyll levels between 30% and 50% lower than expected.

== Impressions and explanations ==
Nicolaï had initially believed the object to be an experimental military device. The close proximity of the site to the Canjuers military base makes such a theory generally plausible. However, GEPAN's investigation focused on conventional explanations, such as atmospheric or terrain causes of a terrestrial nature. Despite a joint investigation by GEPAN and the gendarmerie, which lasted for two years, no plausible explanation was found.

== Critique ==
Some French scientists insist that the GEPAN investigation was flawed, especially the study of the physical traces.

The police report said that the traces, which appeared on an active road, looked like some made by the tyre of a car. This explanation was dismissed by GEPAN because of the sole witness said otherwise. The physical traces shown on the picture are not perfect circles, in fact there are two more-or-less semicircles crossing over each other. Also, a circular shape does not coincide with the description of the UFO made by Nicolaï. In an interview for French television, Nicolaï confirmed that there were vehicles passing by on the road at the time of the sighting.

== See also ==
- List of reported UFO sightings
- UFO sightings in France
