= Watergen =

Atmospheric water generator company

Watergen Inc.
- Founded: 2009; 17 years ago
- Key people: Michael Mirilashvili (President); Maxim Pasik (Executive Chairman); Michael Mirilashvili (CEO)
- Website: www.watergen.com

Watergen Inc. (formerly Water-Gen) is a global company that develops atmospheric water generator (AWG) systems. Its systems generate water from air at 250 Wh per liter.

== History ==
Watergen was founded in 2009 by entrepreneur and former military commander Arye Kohavi and a team of engineers with the goal of providing freely accessible water to troops around the world.

Following the acquisition of Watergen by billionaire Michael Mirilashvili, in 2016, the company turned its attention to addressing water scarcity and responding to the needs of people in the aftermath of natural catastrophes.

Since then, Watergen has created a series of products that are appropriate for a variety of applications, ranging from remote rural locations to commercial office complexes. and private homes. It has been used around the world by armies as well as the public and private sectors in the United States, Latin America, India, Vietnam, Uzbekistan and the African continent.

The company's headquarters are in Petah Tikva. It has a subsidiary in the United States.

In May 2020, the company installed a water-from-air device at the Al-Rantisi Hospital in Gaza. This initiative, a result of a collaboration with the Palestinian power company Mayet Al Ahel, aimed to provide clean and safe off-grid drinking water for the pediatric hospital's staff and patients. The project, led by Mirilashvili, intended to address water scarcity in the Gaza Strip.
