= Trans-en-Provence =

- Commune
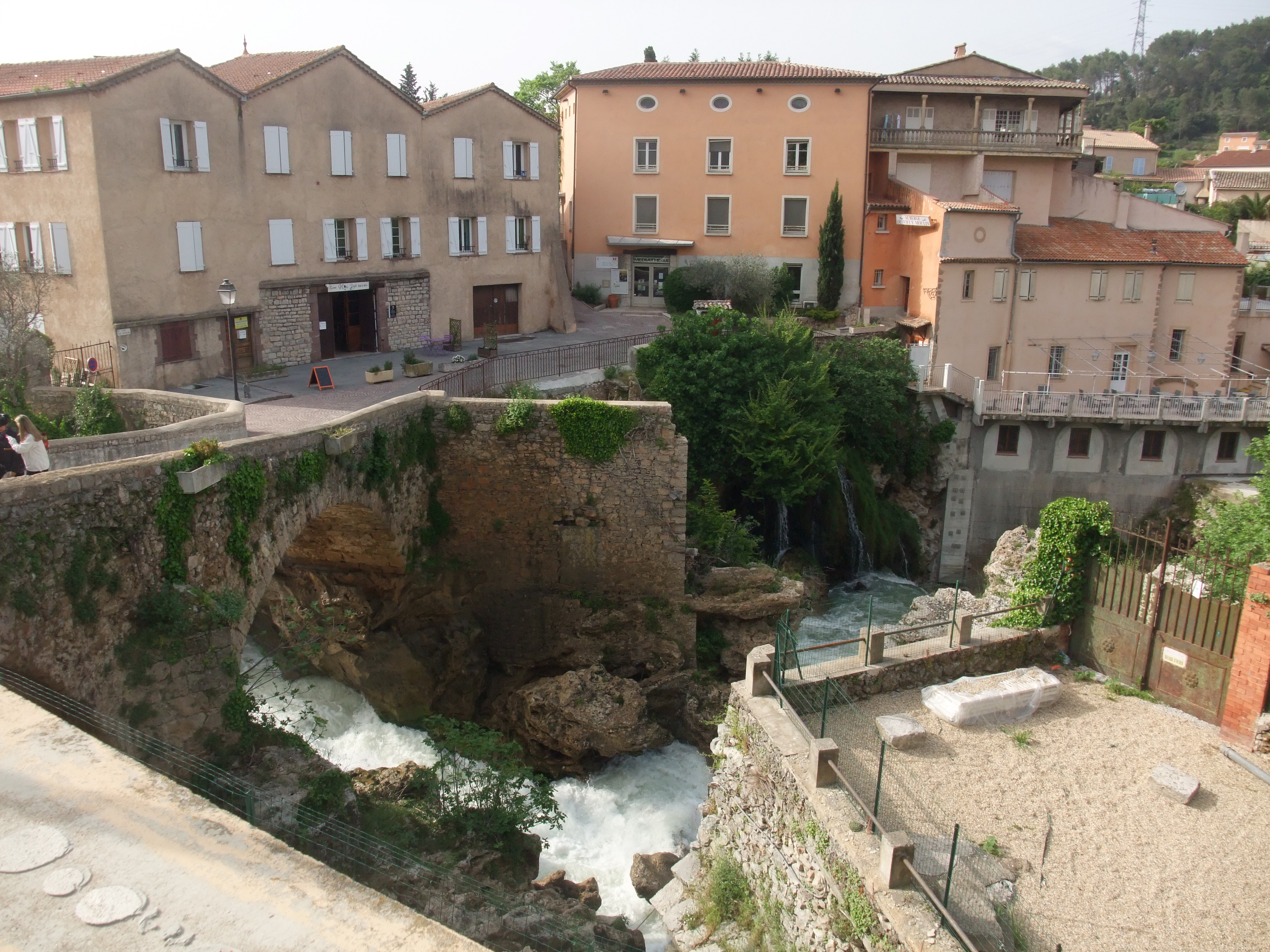
- The river, bridge and buildings in Trans-en-Provence

- Coat of arms
- Location of Trans-en-Provence
- Location within France Location within Provence-Alpes-Côte d'Azur
- Coordinates: 43°30′15″N 6°29′12″E
- Country: France
- Region: Provence-Alpes-Côte d'Azur
- Department: Var
- Arrondissement: Draguignan
- Canton: Draguignan
- Intercommunality: CA Dracénie Provence Verdon

Government
  - Mayor (2020–2026): Alain Caymaris
- Area^{1}: 16.99 km^{2} (6.56 sq mi)
- Elevation: 146 m (479 ft)
- Highest elevation: 272 m (892 ft)
- Lowest elevation: 100 m (330 ft)
- Population (2023): 6,905
  - Density: 406.4/km^{2} (1,053/sq mi)
- Time zone: UTC+01:00 (CET)
  - Summer (DST): UTC+02:00 (CEST)
- INSEE/Postal code: 83141 /83720
- ^{1} French Land Register data, which excludes lakes, ponds, glaciers > 1 km^{2} (0.386 sq mi or 247 acres) and river estuaries.

Trans-en-Provence (French pronunciation: [tʁɑ̃s ɑ̃ pʁɔvɑ̃s]; Provençal: Tranç) is a commune in the Var department in the Provence-Alpes-Côte d'Azur region in southeastern France.

Trans-en-Provence is famous among the ufologists as the site of an alleged UFO incident called the "Trans-en-Provence Case".

== History ==
The village, which was originally located on St Victor's hill, took the name Trans (Latin: "across") on moving across the river Nartuby. The name appears in 1004, in the proceedings of the cartulary of the Abbey of Saint Victor, Marseille. At the end of the twelfth century, the village came under the authority of the Count of Provence who gave it as a fief in 1200 to Giraud de Villeneuve. From that date until 1789, members of the Villeneuve family were the Lords of Trans. The seigneurial seat was transformed into a château-fort in the 14th century. From that time the village, decimated by the Black Death, expanded with the cultivation of olives. In 1506, Louis de Villeneuve, seigneur de Trans, received the title of marquis from Louis XII, in recompense for his actions in the Italian Wars.

== Population ==
Historical population
Year	Pop.	±% p.a.
1968	1,530	—
1975	2,339	+6.25%
1982	3,156	+4.37%
1990	4,003	+3.02%
1999	4,780	+1.99%
2007	5,388	+1.51%
2012	5,562	+0.64%
2017	5,847	+1.00%
2023	6,905	+2.81%
Source: INSEE

== Air well ==
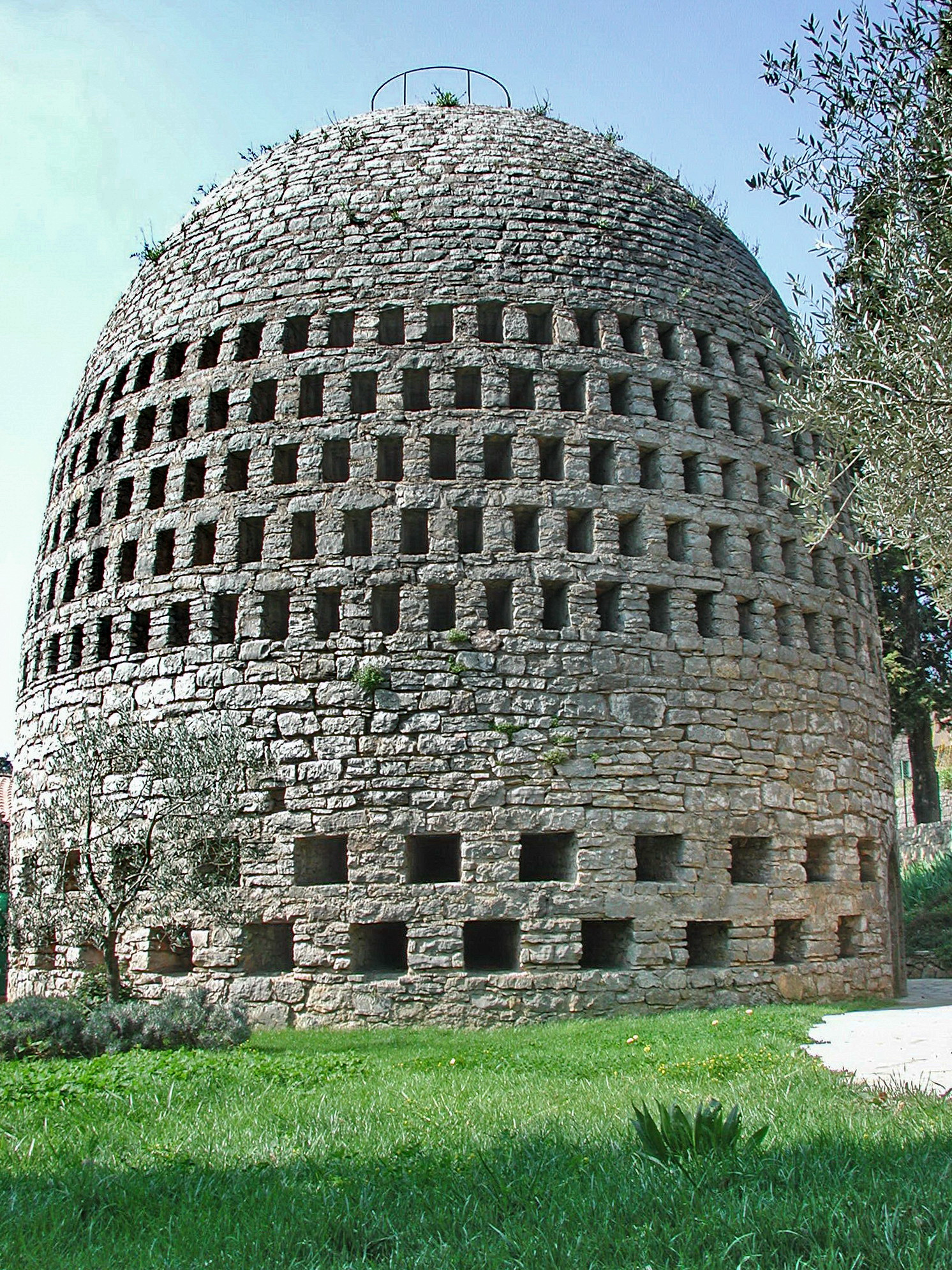
Air well of Belgian engineer Achille Knapen in Trans-en-Provence.

In 1931 the Belgian engineer Achille Knapen constructed an experimental air well in Trans-en-Provence. Its purpose was to collect water from the air by condensation, making use of the temperature difference between night and day. It resembles a beehive, and was designed for use in deserts. It was listed as a historic monument in 1983.

== See also ==
- Communes of the Var department
- Trans-en-Provence Case
