= Fog collection =

Mechanical harvesting of water from fog

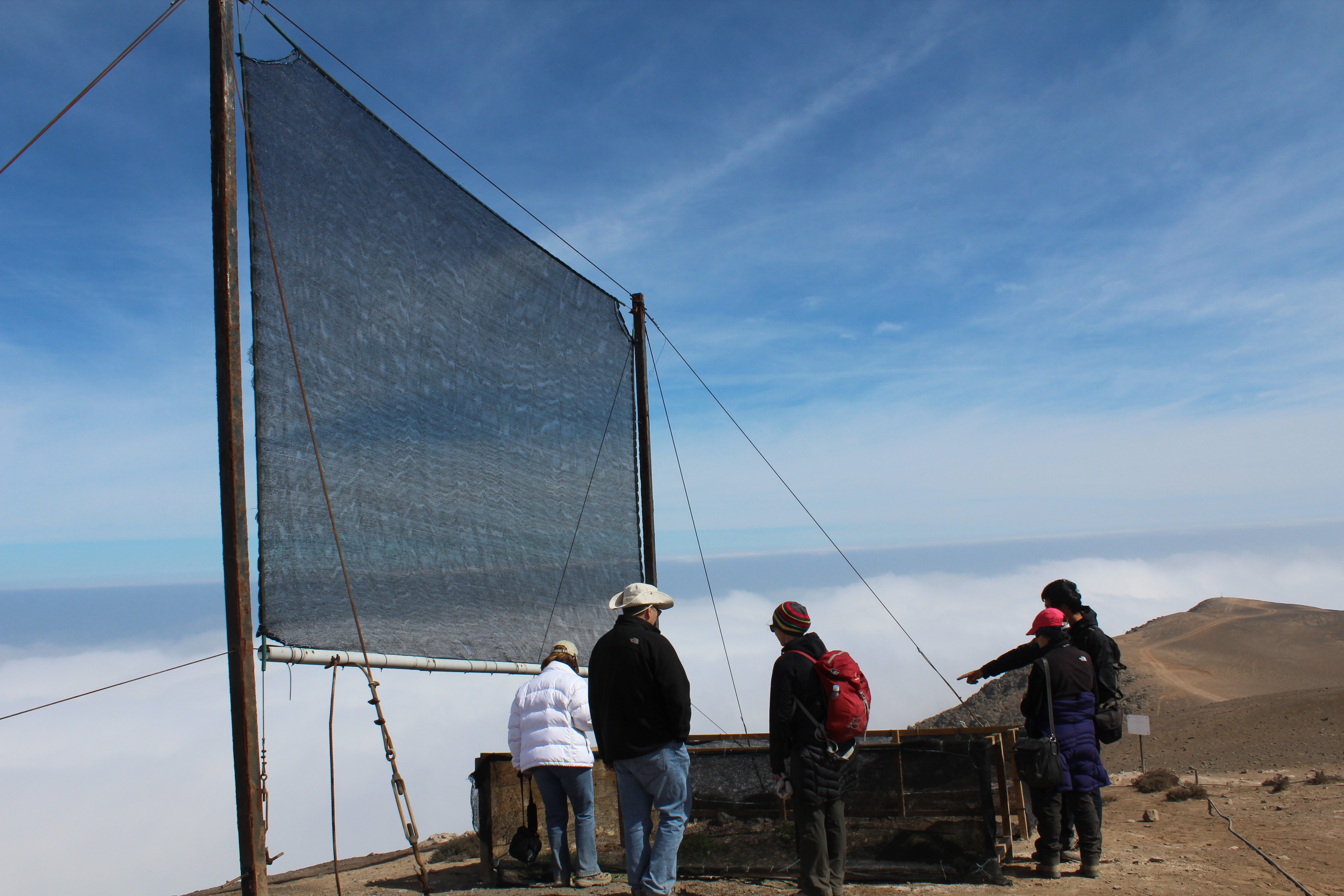
Atrapanieblas or fog collection in Alto Patache, Atacama Desert, Chile

Fog collection, also known as fog harvesting, is the harvesting of water from fog using large pieces of vertical mesh netting to induce the fog-droplets to flow down towards a trough below. The setup is known as a fog fence, fog collector or fog net. Through condensation, atmospheric water vapour from the air condenses on cold surfaces into droplets of liquid water known as dew. The phenomenon is most observable on thin, flat, exposed objects including plant leaves and blades of grass. As the exposed surface cools by radiating its heat to the sky, atmospheric moisture condenses at a rate greater than that of which it can evaporate, resulting in the formation of water droplets.

Water condenses onto the array of parallel wires and collects at the bottom of the net. This requires no external energy and is facilitated naturally through temperature fluctuation, making it attractive for deployment in less developed areas. The term 'fog fence' comes from its long rectangular shape resembling a fence, but fog collectors are not confined just to this structural style. The efficiency of the fog collector is based on the net material, the size of the holes and filament, and chemical coating. Fog collectors can harvest from 2% up to 10% of the moisture in the air, depending on their efficiency. An ideal location is a high altitude arid area near cold offshore currents, where fog is common, and therefore, the fog collector can produce the highest yield.

== Historical origin ==
The organized collection of dew or condensation through natural or assisted processes is an ancient practice, from the small-scale drinking of pools of condensation collected in plant stems (still practiced today by survivalists), to large-scale natural irrigation without rain falling, such as in the Atacama and Namib fog deserts. The first man-made fog collectors stretch back as far as the Inca Empire, where buckets were placed under trees to take advantage of condensation.

Several man-made devices such as antique stone piles in Ukraine, medieval dew ponds in southern England and volcanic stone covers on the fields of Lanzarote have all been thought to be possible dew-catching devices.

One of the first recorded projects of fog collection was in 1969 in South Africa as a water source for an air force base. The structure consisted of two fences each 100m^{2} (1000 sq. ft.). Between the two, 11 litres (2½ gallons) of water was produced on average per day over the 14-month study, which is 110 ml of water for every square meter (⅓ fl. oz. per sq. ft.). The next large study was performed by the National Catholic University of Chile and the International Development Research Centre in Canada in 1987. One hundred 48m^{2} (520 sq. ft.) fog fences were assembled in northern Italy. The project was able to yield on average 0.5 litre of water for every square meter (1½ fl. oz. per sq. ft), or 33L (8 gallons) for each of the 300 villagers, each day.

== In nature ==
Fog collectors were first seen in nature as a technique for collecting water by some insects and foliage. Namib Desert beetles live off water that condenses on their wings due to a pattern of alternating hydrophilic (water attracting) and hydrophobic (water repelling) regions. Redwood forests are able to survive on limited rainfall due to the addition of condensation on needles which drip into the trees' root systems.

== Parts of a fog collector ==
The fog collector is made up of three major parts: the frame, the mesh netting, and the trough or basin.

The frame supports the mesh netting and can be made from a wide array of materials from stainless steel poles to bamboo. The frame can vary in shape. Proposed geometries include linear, similar to a fence and cylindrical. Linear frames are rectangles with the vertical endpoints embedded into the ground. They have rope supports connected at the top and staked into the ground to provide stability.

The mesh netting is where the condensation of water droplets appear. It consists of filaments knitted together with small openings, coated with a chemical to increase condensation. Shade cloth is used for mesh structure because it can be locally sourced in underdeveloped countries. The filaments are coated to be hydrophilic and hydrophobic, which attracts and repels water to increase the condensation. This can retrieve 2% of moisture in the air. Efficiency increases as the size of the filaments and the holes decrease. The most optimal mesh netting is made from stainless steel filaments the size of three to four human hairs and with holes that are twice as big as the filament. The netting is coated in a chemical that decreases water droplet's contact angle hysteresis, which allows for more small droplets to form. This type of netting can capture 10% of the moisture in the air.

Below the mesh netting of a fog fence, there is a small trough for the water to be collected in. The water runs from the trough to some type of storage container or irrigation system for use. If the fog collector is circular the water will be deposited into a basin placed at the bottom of the netting.

== Principle ==
Fog contains typically from 0.05 to 1 grams of water per cubic meter (⅗ to 12 grains per cu. yd.), with droplets from 1 to 40 micrometres in diameter. It settles slowly and is carried by wind. Therefore, an efficient fog fence must be placed facing the prevailing winds, and must be a fine mesh, as wind would flow around a solid wall and take the fog with it.

The water droplets in the fog deposit on the mesh. A second mesh rubbing against the first causes the droplets to coalesce and run to the bottom of the meshes, where the water may be collected and led away.

== Advantages and disadvantages ==
=== Advantages ===
Water can be collected in any environment, including extremely arid environments such as the Atacama Desert, one of the driest places on earth. The harvested water can be safer to drink than ground water. Fog collection is considered low maintenance because it requires no exterior energy and only an occasional brushing of the nets to keep them clean. Parts can sometimes be sourced locally in underdeveloped countries, which allows for the collector to be fixed if broken and to not sit in disrepair. No in-depth training is necessary for repairing the collector. Fog collectors are low cost to implement compared to other water alternatives.

=== Disadvantages ===
Fog fences are limited in quantity by the regional climate and topography and cannot produce more water on demand. Their yields are not consistent year round and are affected by local weather and global weather fluctuations (such as El Niño). Their water supply can still be contaminated by windborne dust, birds, and insects. The moisture collected can promote growth of mold and other possibly toxic microorganisms on the mesh.

== Modern methods ==
In the mid-1980s, the Meteorological Service of Canada (MSC) began constructing and deploying large fog collecting devices on Mont Sutton in Quebec. These simple tools consisted of a large piece of canvas (generally 12 metres; 40' long and 4 metres; 10' high) stretched between two 6 metres (20 ft) wooden poles held up by guy wires, with a long trough underneath. Water would condense out of the fog onto the canvas, coalesce into droplets, and then slide down to drip off of the bottom of the canvas and into the collecting trough below.

In dense urban settings the same mesh technology can be embedded directly into façades, roof fins or brise-soleil so that the building envelope itself becomes a water harvester; such systems are known as building-integrated fog collectors (BIFCs).

=== Chilean project ===
The intent of the Canadian project was simply to use fog collection devices to study the constituents of the fog that they collected. However, their success sparked the interest of scientists in Chile's National Forest Corporation (CONAF) and Catholic University of Chile to exploit the camanchaca or garúa clouds which blanket the northern Chile coast in the southern hemisphere winter. With funding from the International Development Research Centre (IDRC), the MSC collaborated with the Chileans to begin testing different designs of collection facilities on El Tofo Mountain in northern Chile. In the Atacamas Desert near Huasco in Northern Chile, farms were facing water shortages from declining river flows. Two hundred meter, fog-catching water towers were installed, generating 10,000 to 50,000 liters of water daily, which now supports the farming communities without using river water. This Chilean project near Huasco received the Next Generation First Prize in Latin America for advancing sustainable environmental construction projects.

Once perfected, approximately 50 of the systems were erected and used to irrigate seedlings on the hillside in an attempt at reforestation. Once vegetation became established, it should have begun collecting fog for itself, like the many cloud forests in South America, in order to flourish as a self-sustaining system.. The success of the reforestation project is unclear, but approximately five years after the beginning of the project, the nearby village of Chungungo began to push for a pipeline to be sent down the mountain into the town. Though this was not in the scope of CONAF, which pulled out at this point, it was agreed to expand the collection facility to 94 nylon mesh collectors with a reserve tank and piping in order to supply the 300 inhabitants of Chungungo with water.

The IDRC reports that ten years later in 2002, only nine of the devices remained and the system overall was in very poor shape. Conversely, the MSC states in its article that the facility was still fully functional in 2003, but provides no details behind this statement. In June 2003 the IDRC reported that plans existed to revive the site on El Tofo.

In early 2025, researchers in Chile concluded that capturing water from fog - on a large scale - could provide some of the driest cities in the world with drinking water. Researchers conducted fog harvesting in Alto Hospicio, situated in the Atacama Desert, by the coast, is one of the driest places on Earth. The average annual rainfall in the region is less than 0.19 inches (4.8 mm); the city faces significant social challenges, with high levels of poverty and reliance on water delivered by truck.

=== Dar Si Hmad ===
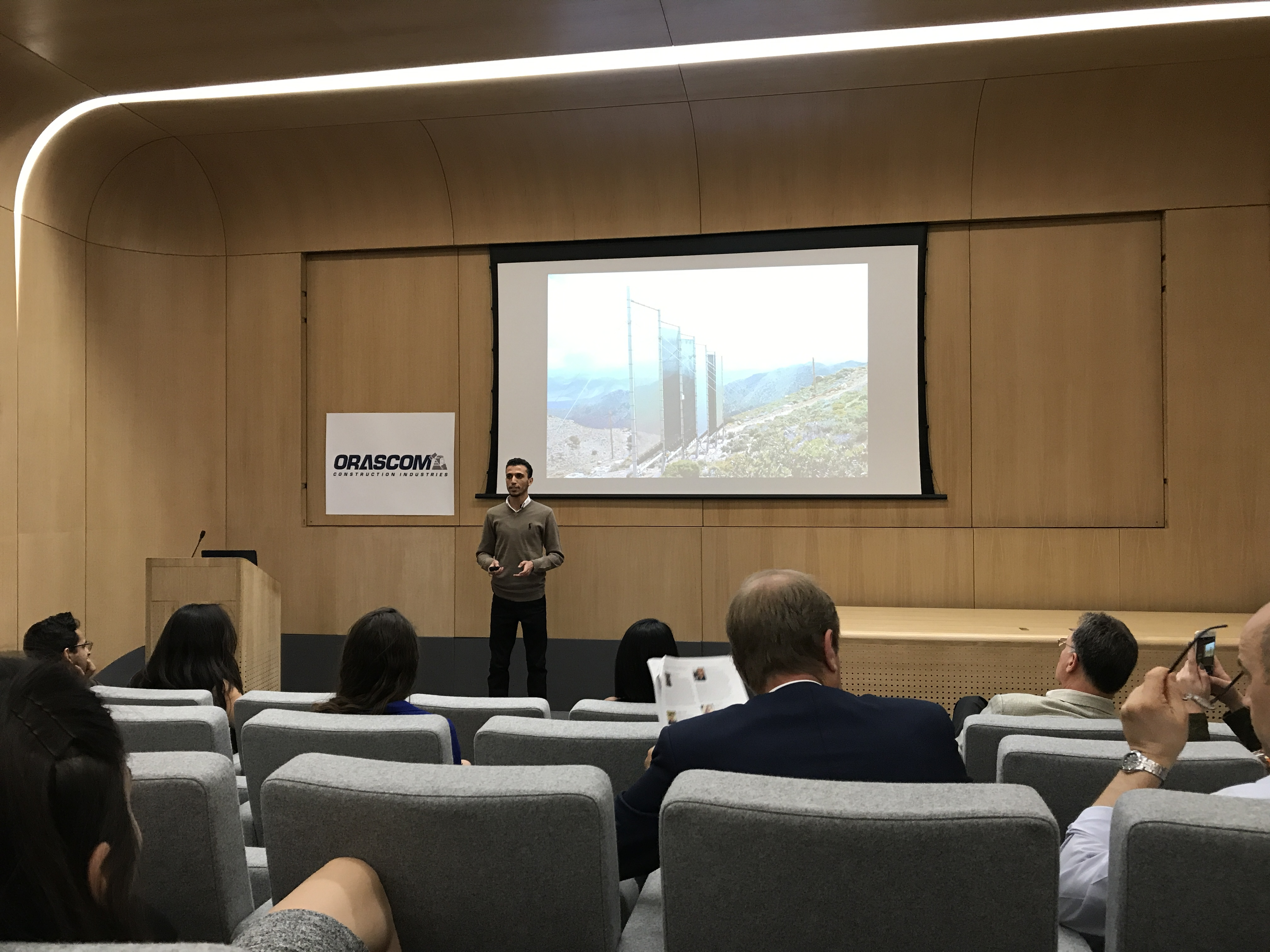
Lafram from the Dar Si Hmad team talking about fog harvesting

In March 2015 Dar Si Hmad (DSH), a Moroccan NGO, built a large fog-collection and distribution system in the Anti-Atlas Mountains. The region DSH worked in is water-poor, but abundant fog drapes the area 6 months out of the year. DSH's system included technology that monitored the water system via SMS message. These capabilities were crucial in dealing with the effects of fog collection on the social fabric of these rural areas. According to MIT researchers, the fog collection methods implemented by DSH have "improved the fog-collecting efficiency by about five hundred per cent."

=== International use ===
Despite the apparent failure of the fog collection project in Chungungo, the method has caught on in some localities around the world. The International Organization for Dew Utilization organization is working on foil-based effective condensers for regions where rain or fog cannot cover water needs throughout the year. Shortly after the initial success of the project, researchers from the participating organizations formed the nonprofit organization FogQuest, which has set up operational facilities in Yemen and central Chile, while still others are under evaluation in Guatemala, Haiti, and Nepal, this time with much more emphasis on the continuing involvement of the communities in the hopes that the projects will last well into the future. Villages in a total of 25 countries worldwide now operate fog collection facilities. There is potential for the systems to be used to establish dense vegetation on previously arid grounds. It appears that the inexpensive collectors will continue to flourish. There have been several attempts to set up fog catchers in Peru, with varying success.

== See also ==
- Air well (condenser) – Building or device that collects water by condensing vapor
- Atmospheric water generator – Device that extracts drinkable water from humid air
- Cloud seeding – Weather modification that condenses clouds to cause rainfall
- Water resources – Sources of water that are potentially useful for humans
- Building-integrated fog collectors – Integration of fog-harvesting systems into building envelopes

== Sources ==
- International Development Research Centre article on the fog collection project
- Meteorological Service of Canada article on fog collection project
