= Arye Kohavi =

Israeli entrepreneur

- אריה כוכבי
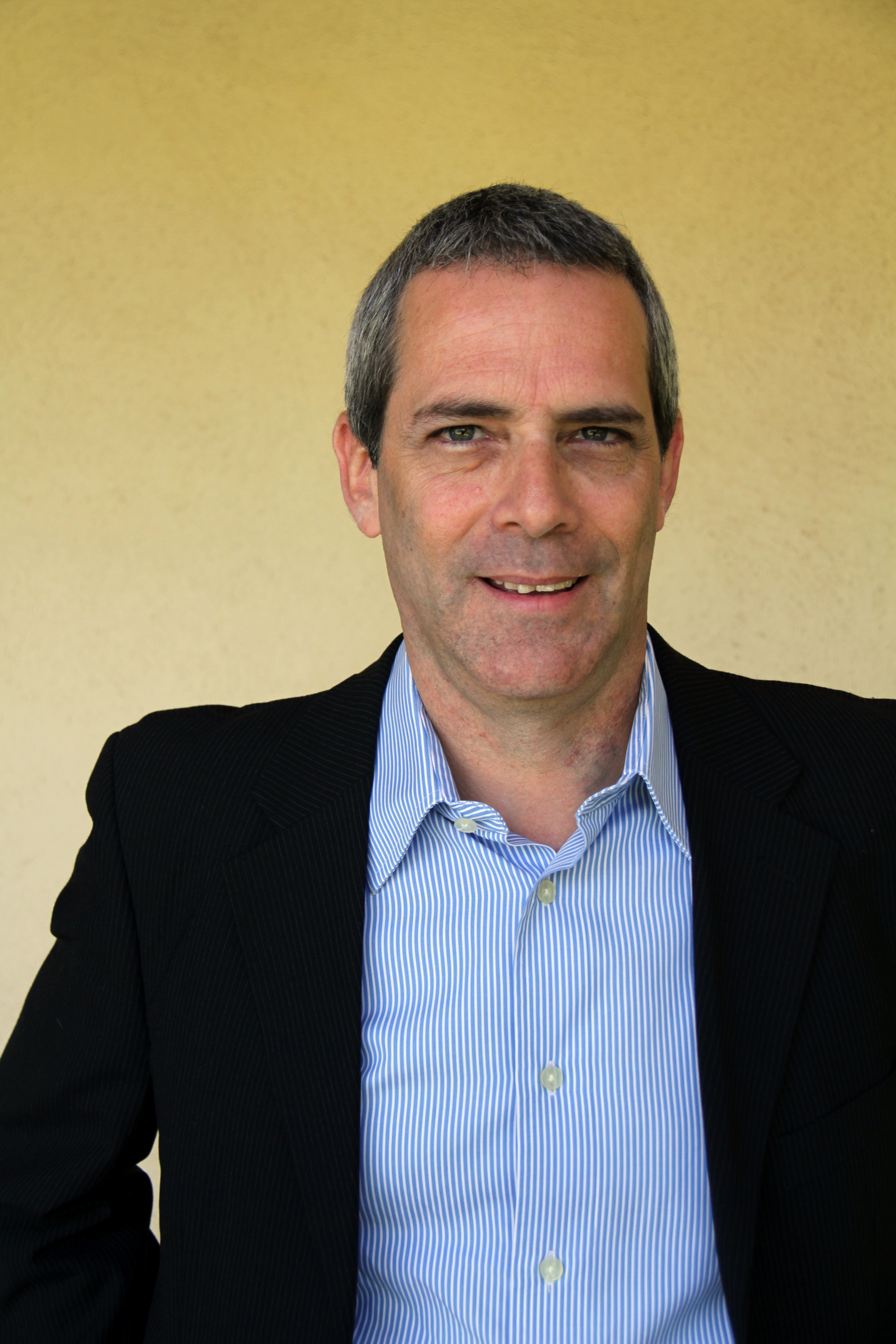

Personal details
- Born: 24 June 1967 (age 58)
- Occupation: Founder, president and co-CEO, Water-Gen

Arye Kohavi (Hebrew: אריה כוכבי; born 24 June 1967) is an Israeli entrepreneur and innovator, the Chairman, CEO and co-founder of 2D Generation Ltd, and a director at Adisyn (traded at Australian Securities Exchange under the symbol AI1).

2D Generation develops graphene-based technologies for the semiconductor industry. Arye previously founded and was Co-CEO of Watergen, which develops water and air systems and dehumidification technologies.

Kohavi lives in Neve Monosson, Israel; is married with four children.

== Early life and education ==
Kohavi holds an MBA and a BA in economics and accounting from the Hebrew University in Jerusalem, and served in the IDF as a combat reconnaissance company commander.

== Business career ==
Kohavi founded and was chairman of Composita, a novel E-learning software developer. He also served as an independent mergers and acquisitions manager, chairman and director in top-end Israeli companies, and as co-CEO at Meitav Corporate Finance, one of Israel's leading investment houses.

Kohavi, an Israeli Special Forces officer, began working on a drinking water solution in 2008 after observing the logistics challenges Israeli forces had during the Israeli-Lebanon conflict two years earlier. After several days, most of the convoys were shot up, so the soldier on the front line was out of water. The idea was to provide independence for the troops on the field with a 120-pound system on the vehicle that extracts water from ambient air and is capable of creating 12.6 U.S. gal (48 L) in 24 hours at 75 °F (24 °C) and 55 percent humidity.

In June 2009 Kohavi founded Water-Gen (Watergen) a company that designs solutions for supplying water. Water-Gen solutions for the defense sector include: atmospheric water generation (drinking water-from-air), treatment of air conditioning run-off water, and battery-operated mobile water purification units. The company has been selling its products to customers such as the US Army, UK Army, Israel Defense Forces, French Army, and civilian applications such as home-appliance water generator.

== Awards ==
- Arye Kohavi has been chosen as one of the world's 100 Leading Global Thinkers, and one of the world's top innovators of 2014 by Foreign Policy magazine.
- Water-Gen was chosen as one of the "Nine Greatest Israeli Inventions of All Times" by the Israeli Ministry of Economy, and Ynet readers.
- Water-Gen's Genny was chosen as one of the world's 100 Best Inventions of year 2019, by Time magazine.
- Arye Kohavi was listed as one of the "Top 100 People Positively Influencing Jewish Life, 2018", by the Algemeiner Journal.
