= Watermaker =

Device used to obtain potable water by reverse osmosis of seawater

A watermaker is a device used to obtain potable water by reverse osmosis of seawater. In boating and yachting circles, desalinators are often referred to as "watermakers".

The devices can be expensive to acquire and maintain, but are quite valuable because they reduce the need for large water tanks for a long passage.

The term watermaker may also refer to an atmospheric water generator, a machine that extracts potable water from the humidity in air using a refrigeration or a desiccant.

== Varieties ==
Many versions are used by long-distance ocean cruisers.

Depending on the design, watermakers can be powered by electricity from the battery bank, an engine, an AC generator or hand operated. There is a portable, towed, water-powered watermaker available which converts to hand operation in an emergency.

== Water requirement ==
There is great variation in the amount of water consumed.

At home in the United States, each person uses about 55 U.S. gallons (210 liters) of water per day on average. Where supplies are limited, and in emergencies, much less may be used.

Typical cruising yachts use from 4 to 20 liters (1.1 to 5.3 U.S. gallons) per person per day, the average probably being about 6 liters (1.6 U.S. gallons). The minimum water intake required to maintain body hydration is 1.5 liters (0.40 U.S. gallons) per day. The amount of water that is required for a person to consume is dependent on different factors. Some of these factors include weight, height and gender. Men on average need a greater amount of water than women do.

Popular brands of yacht watermakers typically make from 2 to 150 litres per hour of operation (0.53 to 41 gallons) depending on the model.

There are strong opinions among small boat cruisers about the usefulness of these devices. The arguments may be summarised as:

=== Pros ===
- A watermaker uses only a small amount of fuel to generate a large amount of water, eliminating the need for large, heavy water tanks.
- The user is independent of shore-based water supplies, which is especially important in remote areas.
- They provide safe water when shore-based water is of uncertain quality.
- Some designs are portable and can be converted to manual operation in an emergency.
- The hand-held unit offered by one manufacturer and the towed water-powered watermaker offered by another manufacturer can be transferred to a liferaft in an emergency.

=== Cons ===
- They are expensive: Indicative costs are US$2,000 for the manual type, US$3,000 for the towed water-powered type, US$4,000 or more for an engine-driven type (designed to be fitted to the inboard motor of the vessel), and about the same for an AC generator-driven type.
- Some types (but not all) are time-consuming and expensive to maintain.
- They are power hungry, except the hand-held emergency watermaker and the towed water powered type. Accordingly, these devices must overcome the problem of large electric current demand. The drawbacks for the non-electric designs are that manual operation is tiring for the operator and the towed watermaker only works while the vessel is moving.

Some manufacturers of electrically powered watermakers have energy recovery systems in their design which reduce the power consumption; however, these are typically some 50% more expensive for any similar size due to their additional complexity. As a guideline, assuming a 12V DC system, the energy recovery incorporated in those watermakers has the effect of reducing the electric current used from perhaps typically 20A to about 8A. Like any piece of equipment, it is bound to fail at some time and cause expense/anxiety.

== Technology ==
All watermakers designed for small boats and yachts rely on essentially the same technology, exploiting the principle of "reverse osmosis": a high pressure pump forcing seawater through a membrane that allows water but not salt to pass.

The common comparison is that of a filter; however, as the holes in the membrane are smaller than molecules of sodium chloride (salt) and indeed smaller than bacteria, and pressures in the nature of 45-50 bar are required, the process is much more complex than the common water filter or the oil filter found in automobile engines.

== Atmospheric water generator ==
An atmospheric water generator is a machine that extracts potable water from the humidity in air using a refrigeration or a desiccant. Condensing moisture by refrigeration requires a minimum ambient temperature of about 10–15 °C (50–59 °F), while desiccant adsorbers have no such restriction. Either method is suitable for a desert climate, where water production is dependent on ambient humidity. The Negev desert in Israel, for example, has a significant average relative humidity of 64%.

Contrary to some online sources, a 1922 article in Popular Science cites an average relative humidity of 30% for the Sahara Desert, about half the humidity in an air-conditioned home. Moreover, the effect of the dew point causes early mornings to have higher humidity, so that atmospheric water generation is possible even in the harshest climates.
