= Groasis Waterboxx =

Device to help grow trees in dry areas

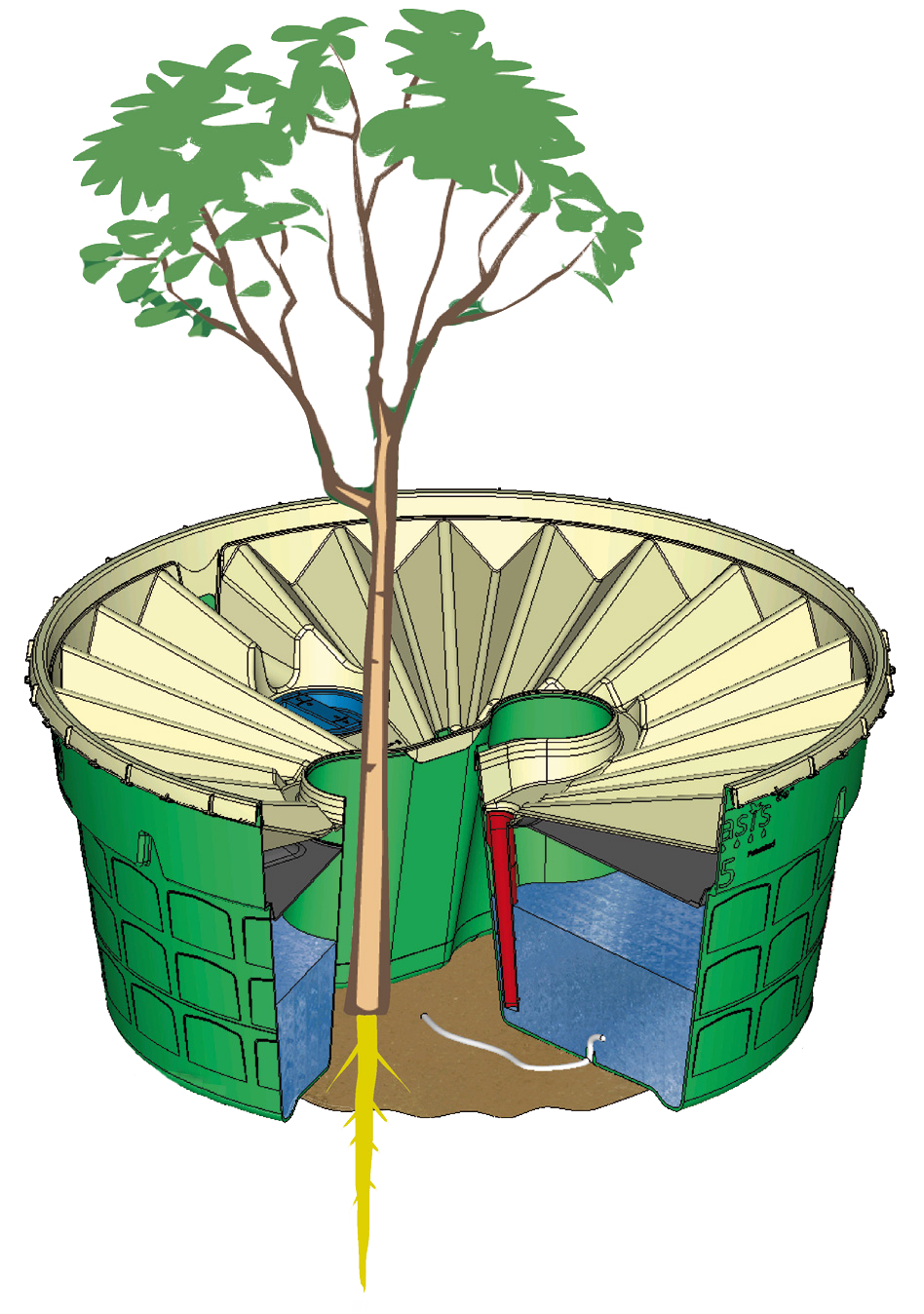
Plant rooting and growing in the Groasis Waterboxx

The Groasis Waterboxx is a plant container designed to help in growing trees in dry areas. It was invented and developed by Dutch former flower exporter Pieter Hoff, and won the Popular Science Green Tech Best of What’s New Innovation of the Year Award for 2010. The word "Groasis" is a neologism formed as a portmanteau of the words "grow" and "oasis".

== Background ==
Large land areas in the world are too dry for trees to survive. Although water may be present in the ground, it is often too deep for small trees to develop a root structure to reach. The Groasing Technology employs biomimicry to solve the problem of growing plants in deserts, eroded areas, badlands and on rocks. The purpose of this technology is to replant such areas, restore the vegetation cover, and make them productive with fruit trees and vegetables.

== Design ==
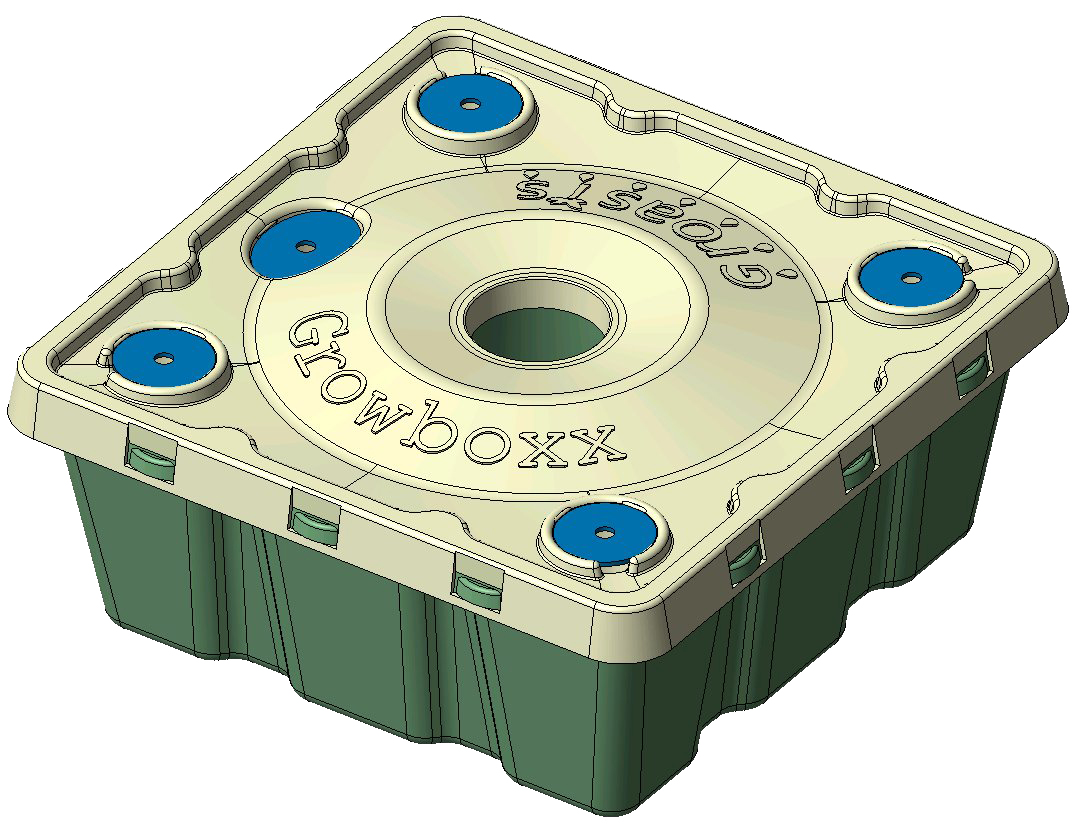
Biodegradable Growboxx plant cocoon

The Groasis Waterboxx is a polypropylene bucket with a lid. It has a vertical tunnel in the middle for two plants. A wick allows water from inside the box to trickle into the ground via capillary action. The device mimics the insulating effect bird feces provide to germinating seeds. The box's lid is covered by tiny papillae, which create a superhydrophobic surface due to the lotus effect. The lid serves to funnel even the smallest amount of water down siphons into the box's central reservoir.

The product functions as a plant incubator, sheltering both a newly planted sapling and the ground around it from the heat of the sun, while providing water for the plant. The lid collects water from rain and nighttime condensation, which is then stored in the bucket. The water-filled reservoir releases small amounts (around 50 ml per day) of water into the ground by a wick to water the tree and to encourage the tree to develop a root structure. The box acts as a shield for the water in the upper ground, and this water then spreads down and out instead of being drawn to the surface and evaporated. Both temperature and humidity beneath and inside the box are more stable night and day than without.

From 2003 to 2010, the development of the Groasis Waterboxx has cost $7.1 million.

== Installation ==
Use of the box initially involves digging a hole in the ground by a human or a machine. One to three plants are planted in the hole, and a cardboard panel is placed around the plants. In dry areas, the soil around the plants is inoculated with mycorrhizae to release nutrients in the soil that would otherwise be chemically inaccessible to the growing plants. A wick is inserted in the bottom of the Groasis which is then lowered over the plants and filled with water. Two lids are put on, funnels inserted and a cap plugs the top lid.

== Testing ==
The box has been testing for the 3 years at Mohamed Premier University in Morocco where nearly 90% of plants survived with the box compared to 10% without. Apart from projects in warm arid areas, the box is being tested in wineries and cold mountain regions.

== Growboxx ==
Another version is called Growboxx. It is a recycled paper bucket and should not be removed after a year. The bucket itself becomes food for the tree.

== See also ==
- Agroforestry
- Air well (condenser)
- Applied ecology
- Desertification
- Water Butt / Rainwater Tank
- Ecological engineering methods
- Environmental technology
- Green Sahara
