= Atmospheric water generator =

Device that extracts drinkable water from humid air

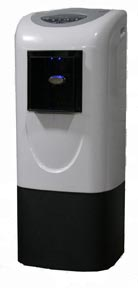
State-of-the-art AWG for home use.

An atmospheric water generator (AWG), is a device that extracts water from humid ambient air, producing potable water. Water vapor in the air can be extracted either by condensation — cooling the air below its dew point, exposing the air to desiccants, using membranes that only pass water vapor, collecting fog, or pressurizing the air. AWGs are useful where potable water is difficult to obtain, because water is always present in ambient air. In dense urban areas, the same mesh technology can be incorporated directly into façades and roofs so that the building envelope itself harvests fog; systems that use this approach are called building-integrated fog collectors.

AWG may require significant energy inputs, or operate passively, relying on natural temperature differences. Biomimicry studies found that the Onymacris unguicularis beetle has the ability to perform this task.

One study reported that AWGs could help provide potable water to one billion people.

== History ==
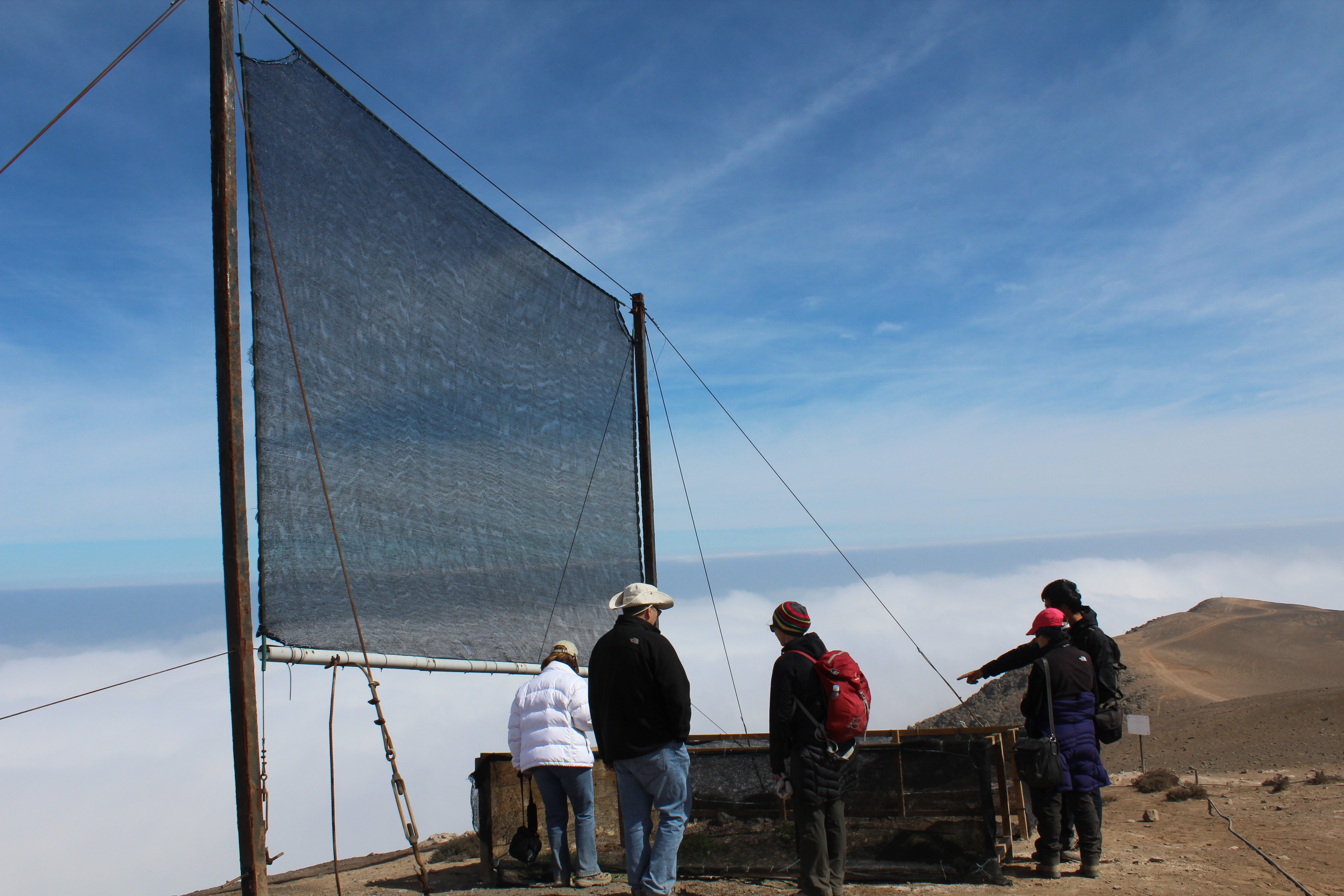
"Atrapanieblas" or fog collection in Alto Patache, Atacama Desert, Chile.

Incas were able to sustain their culture above the rain line by collecting dew and channeling it to cisterns. Records indicate that they used water-collecting fog fences. These traditional methods were passive, employing no external energy source and relying on naturally occurring temperature variations.

An emergency survival device existed as the Armbrust cup that converts condensation from breath into drinking water—for use in emergency landings at sea.

In 2022 brine-based extraction technology was contracted by the US Army and the US Navy from Terralab and the Federal Emergency Management Agency (FEMA).

DARPA's Atmospheric Water Extraction program aims to develop a device that can provide water for 150 soldiers and be carried by four people. In February 2021 General Electric was awarded 14 million dollars to continue development of their device.

In 2022, a cellulose/konjac gum-based desiccant was demonstrated that produced 13 L/kg/day (1.56 US gal/lb/day) of water at 30% humidity, and 6 L/kg/day (0.72 US gal/lb/day) at 15% humidity. The dessicant releases the water when heated to 60 °C (140 °F).

In 2024 researchers announced a device that used vertical fins spaced 2 mm (0.08 in) apart. The fins are copper sheets, enveloped in copper foams coated with a zeolite. The water is released when the copper sheets are heated to 184 °C (363 °F). The fins become saturated in air with 30% humidity once per hour. Heated hourly, the harvester can produce 5.8 L (1.5 gal)/day per kilogram (2.2 lb) of material.

In 2026, a researcher by the name of Ankith Burki found that playing low-frequency sine waves through a thermoelectric atmospheric water generator increased the water output by 117% compared to a silent baseline, a project that earned him a position as a finalist in the prestigious Thermo Fisher Scientific Junior Innovators Challenge.

== Technologies ==
Cooling-based systems are the most common, while hygroscopic systems are showing promise. Hybrid systems combine adsorption, refrigeration and condensation. Air wells are another way to passively collect moisture.

=== Cooling condensation ===
Example of cooling-condensation process.

Condensing systems are the most common approach. They use a compressor to circulate refrigerant through a condenser and an evaporator coil to cool the surrounding air. Once the air reaches its dew point, water condenses into the collector. A fan pushes filtered air over the coil. A purification/filtration system removes contaminants and reduces the risk posed by ambient microorganisms.

The rate of water production depends on the ambient temperature, humidity, the volume of air passing over the coil, and the machine's cooling capacity. AWGs become more effective as relative humidity and air temperature increase. As a rule of thumb, cooling condensation AWGs do not work efficiently when the ambient temperature falls below 65 °F (18 °C) or the relative humidity drops below 30%.

The Peltier effect of semiconducting materials offer an alternative condensation system in which one side of the semi-conducting material heats while the other side cools. In this approach, the air is sent over the cooling fins on the cool side, which lowers the air temperature. Solid-state semiconductors are convenient for portable units, but this is offset by low efficiency and high power consumption.

Generation can be enhanced in low humidity conditions by using an evaporative cooler with a brackish water supply to increase humidity. Greenhouses are a special case because the interior air is hotter and more humid. Examples include the seawater greenhouse in Oman and the IBTS Greenhouse.

Dehumidifying air conditioners produce non-potable water. The relatively cold (below the dewpoint) evaporator coil condenses water vapor from the processed air.

When powered by coal-based electricity it has one of the worst carbon footprints of any water source (exceeding reverse osmosis seawater desalination by three orders of magnitude) and demands more than four times as much water up the supply chain than it delivers to the user.

=== Hygroscopy ===
Hygroscopic techniques pull water from the air via absorption or adsorption, which desiccate the air. Desiccants may be liquid ("wet") or solid. They need to be regenerated (typically thermally) to recover the water.

The most efficient and sustainable method is to use an adsorption refrigerator powered by solar thermal, which outperforms photovoltaic-powered systems. Such systems can use waste heat, e.g. for pumping or for overnight operation, when humidity tends to rise.

In 2024 a sorbent-based atmospheric water harvesting (SAWH) technology using a fin-array adsorption bed powered by high-density waste heat demonstrated 5.8 liters per kg of sorbent per day at 30% humidity via a 1 l adsorbent bed and commercial adsorbents.

==== Wet desiccants ====
Examples of liquid desiccants include lithium chloride, lithium bromide, calcium chloride, magnesium chloride, potassium formate, triethylene glycol, and [EMIM][OAc].

Concentrated brine can serve as a desiccant. The brine absorbs water, which is then extracted and purified. Some versions produce 5 gallons of water per gallon of fuel. Concentrated brine, streamed down the outside of towers, absorbs water vapor. The brine then enters a chamber, under a partial vacuum and is heated, releasing water vapor that is condensed and collected. As the condensed water is removed from the system using gravity, it creates a vacuum which lowers the brine's boiling point. The system can be powered by passive solar energy.

Hydrogels can capture moisture (e.g. at night in a desert) to cool solar panels or produce fresh water. One application is to irrigate crops locating the hydrogel next to solar panel integrated systems or beneath the panels.

==== Solid desiccants ====
Silica gel and zeolite desiccate pressurized air. One device consumes 310 watt-hours (1,100 kJ) per liter of water. It uses a zirconium/organic metal-organic framework on a porous copper base, attached to a graphite substrate. The sun heats the graphite, releasing the water, which then cools the graphite.

=== Fuel cells ===
A hydrogen fuel cell car generates one liter of potable water for every 8 miles (12.87 kilometers) traveled by combining hydrogen with ambient oxygen.

=== Hydropanel ===
Potable water can be generated by rooftop solar hydropanels using solar power and solar heat.

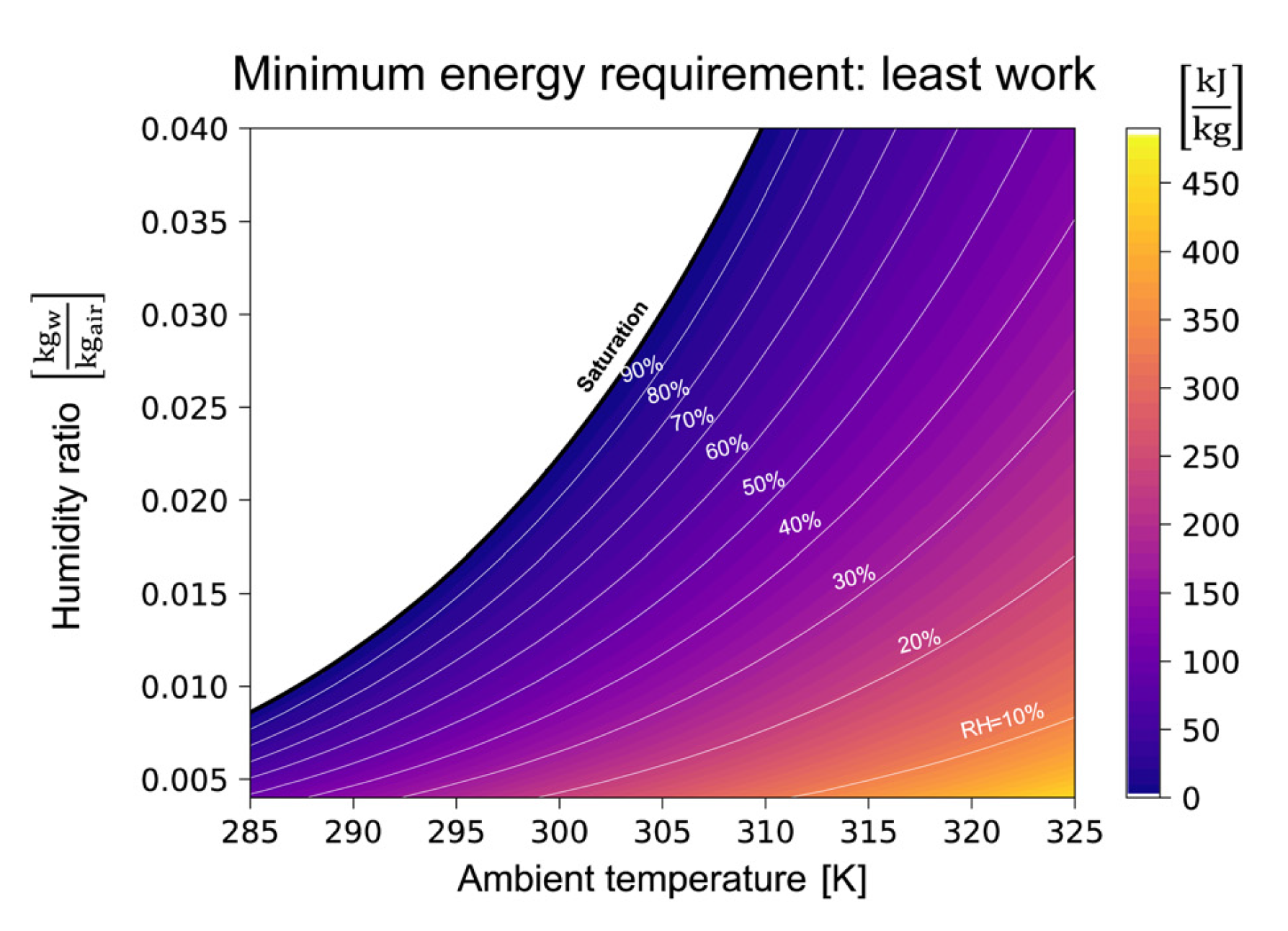
The minimum energy for atmospheric water harvesting

== Energy ==
Unless the air is super-saturated with moisture, energy is required to harvest water from the atmosphere. The energy required is a function of the humidity and temperature. It can be calculated using Gibbs free energy.

== See also ==
- Air well (condenser) – Building or device that collects water by condensing vapor
- Dehumidifier – Device which reduces humidity
- Desalination – Removal of salts from water
- Dew pond – Artificial pond for watering livestock
- Fog collection – Mechanical harvesting of water from fog
- Building-integrated fog collectors – Integration of fog-harvesting systems into building envelopes
- Rainwater harvesting – Accumulation of rainwater for reuse
- Solar chimney – Ventilation using solar energy
- Solar still – Water distillation and purification system using solar energy
- Watergen – Atmospheric water generator company
- Watermaker – Device used to obtain potable water by reverse osmosis of seawater
- Water scarcity – Situation where there is a shortage of water
