= Blue pigments =

Natural or synthetic materials

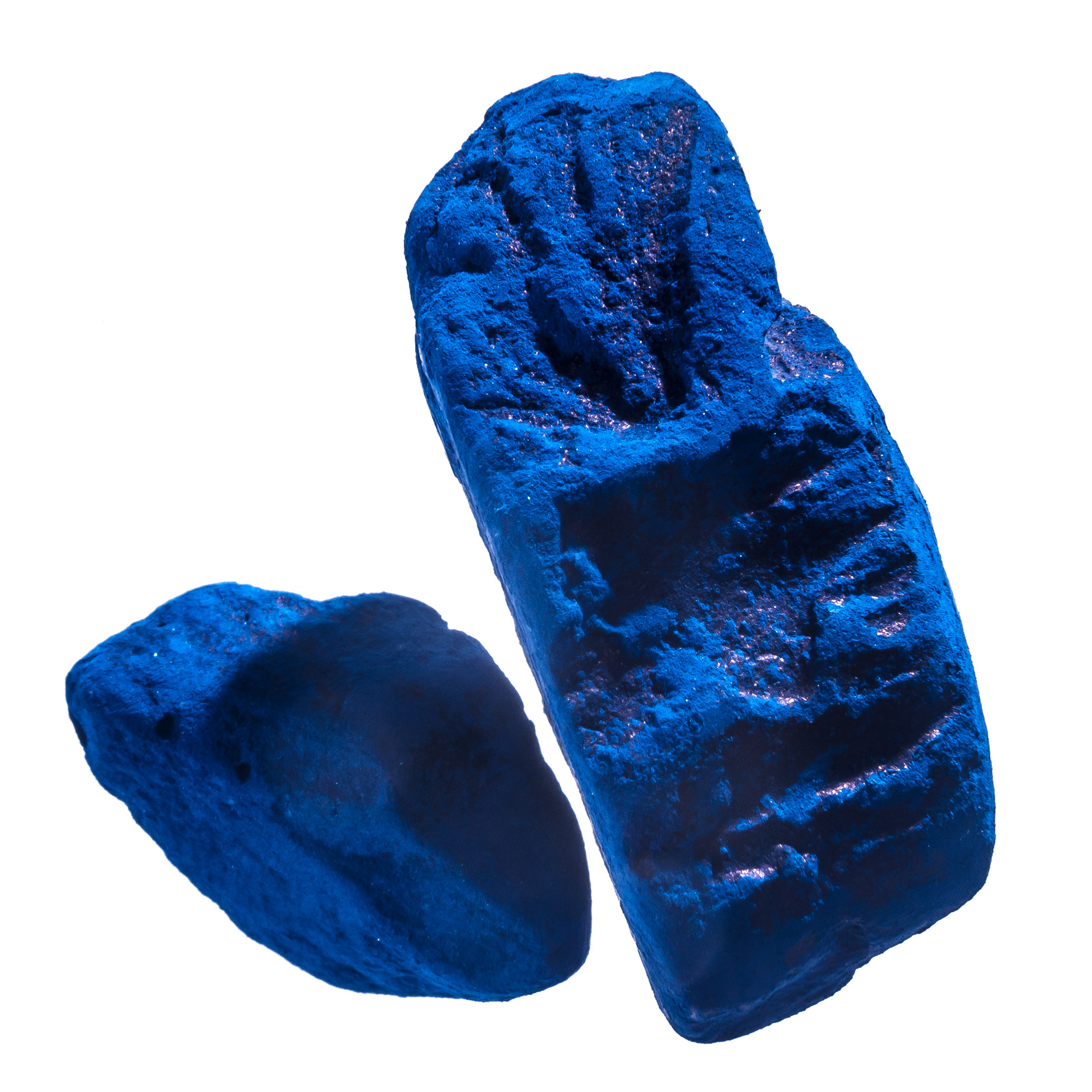
Blocks of synthetic indigo

Blue pigments are natural or synthetic materials, traditionally made from minerals. Being water-insoluble by definition, blue pigments used to make the blue colors in inks and paints. Some major blue pigments are indigo, Prussian blue, and copper phthalocyanine. Historically, lapis lazuli was important.

== History ==
The earliest use of blue pigments in Europe uncovered by archeologists were from the Final Palaeolithic (c. 14 000–11 700 BP) open-air site of Mühlheim-Dietesheim (Germany).

The discovery of Egyptian blue (CaCuSi_{4}O_{10}) was promoted by the Egyptian pharaohs who sponsored the creation of new pigments to be used in art. Other civilizations combined organic and mineral materials to create blue pigments ranging from azure-blue like the Maya blue to the Han blue (BaCuSi_{4}O_{10}), which was developed by the Chinese Han dynasty and manipulated to produce a light or dark blue color.

Cobalt blue (CoAl_{2}O_{4}) was first described in 1777. Very stable, it has been traditionally used as a coloring agent in ceramics. Ultramarine (Na_{7}Al_{6}Si_{6}O_{24}S_{3}) was made by grinding the forbiddingly expensive lapis lazuli into a powder until a cheaper synthetic form was invented in 1826 by the French industrialist Jean Baptiste Guimet and in 1828 by the German chemist Christian Gmelin. Prussian blue (Fe_{4}[Fe(CN)_{6}]_{3}) was first described by the German polymath Johann Leonhard Frisch and the president of the Prussian Academy of Sciences, Gottfried Wilhelm Leibniz, in 1708. Azurite (Cu_{3}(CO_{3})_{2}(OH)_{2}) is a soft, deep-blue copper mineral produced by weathering copper ore deposits; it was used since ancient times and was first recorded by the first century Roman writer Pliny the Elder. Phthalocyanine Blue BN was first prepared in 1927 and has wide range of applications.

== Major contemporary blue pigments ==
=== Indigo ===
Although sometimes considered a dye, indigo is a pigment (insoluble in water). Unlike many traditional mineral-based blues, indigo is an organic compound. It was once obtained by laborious extraction from various plants. Subsequent to the discovery of synthetic dyes, such as mauvine, a chemical route was discovered to this material. In 2022, about 20,000 tonnes were produced, making indigo the dominant blue pigment in terms of volume. It is mainly used for the production of blue jeans. It is also used as a food colorant, and is listed in the United States as FD&C Blue No. 2.

=== Copper phthalocyanine ===
Chemical structure of copper phthalocyanine

Copper phthalocyanine ("phthalo blue") is a synthetic blue pigment frequently used in paints, inks, and dyes. It is highly valued for its superior properties such as light fastness, tinting strength, covering power and resistance to the effects of alkalis and acids. It has the appearance of a blue powder, insoluble in most solvents including water.

=== Prussian blue ===
Prussian blue is a dark blue pigment containing iron and cyanide produced by the oxidation of ferrous ferrocyanide salts. In crude but reproducible form, it was invented in Berlin between 1704 and 1710. It had an immediate impact on the pigment market, because its intense deep blue color approached the quality of ultramarine at a much lower price and superior longevity. Subsequent work led to a rational route to well defined Prussian blue. In 1995, an estimated 13 000–15 000 tons were produced, mainly for printing inks

Prussian blue was also widely adopted by major European artists, notably Thomas Gainsborough and Canaletto, who used it to paint the Venetian sky. It was also used by Japanese artists, including Hokusai, for the deeper blues of waves.

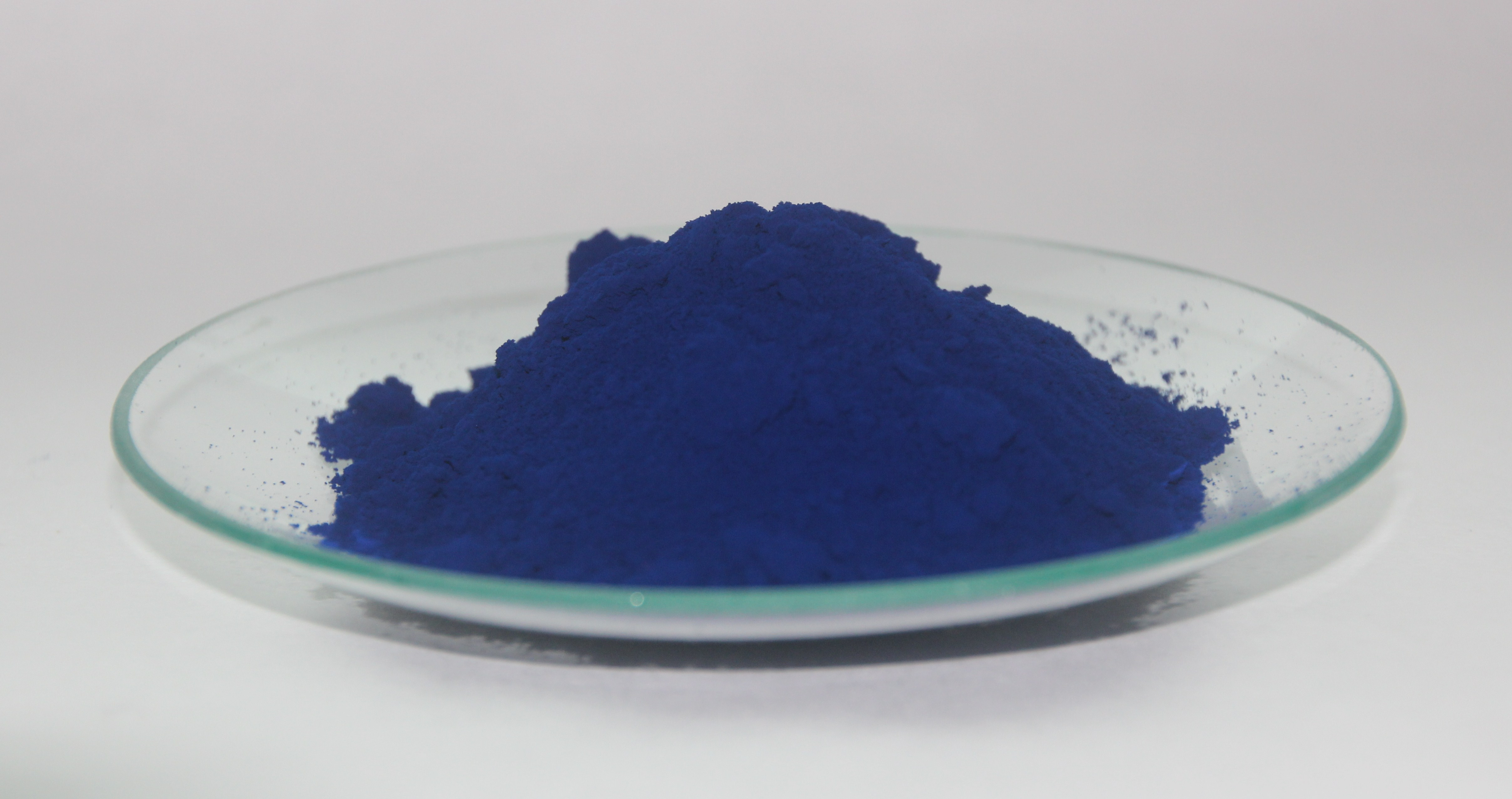
Prussian blue

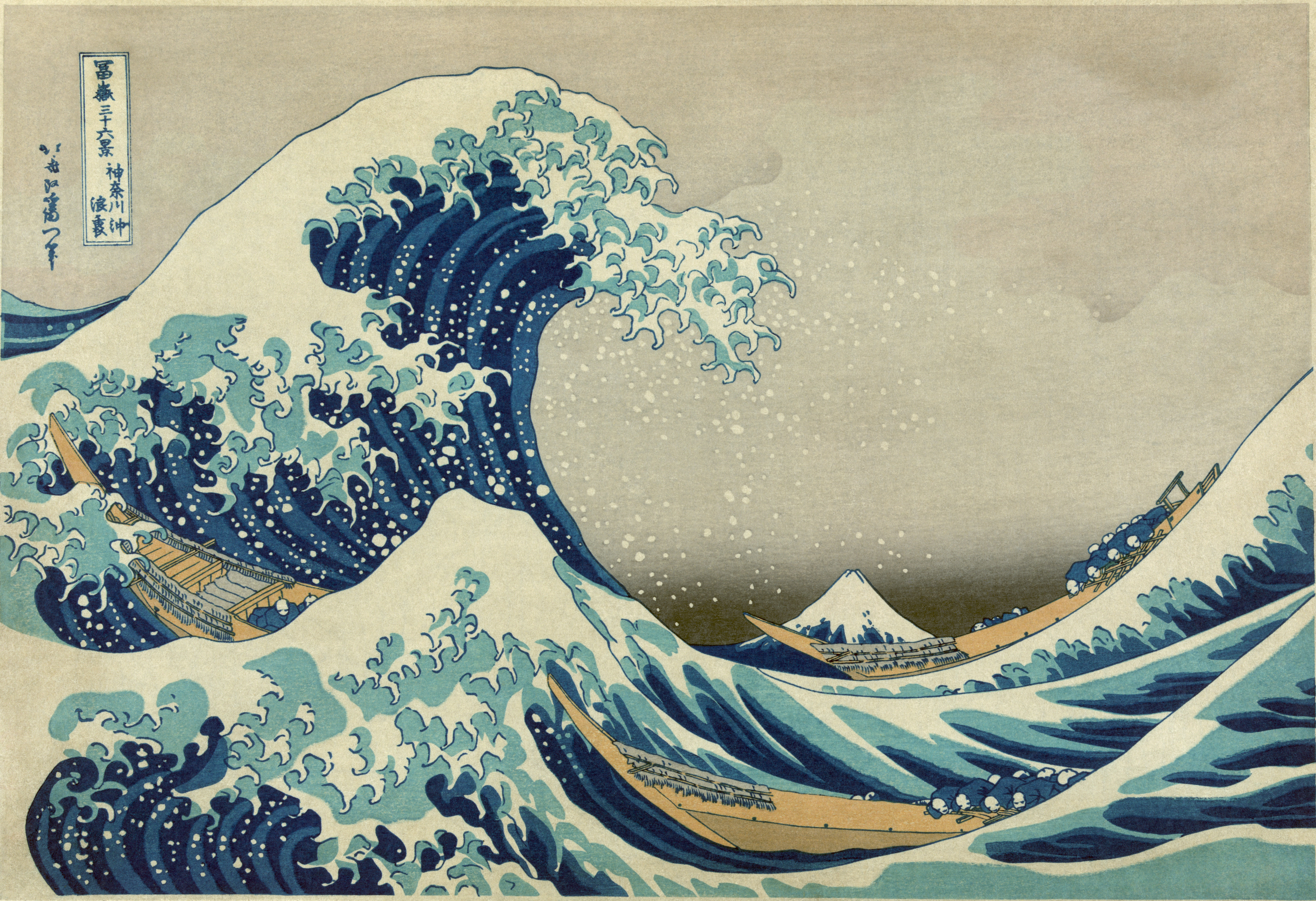
Kanagawa-oki nami ura (The Great Wave off Kanagawa) (1831)
Hokusai

=== Ultramarine ===
Ultramarine was historically a prestigious and expensive blue pigment. It was produced from lapis lazuli, a mineral whose major source was the mines of Sar-e-Sang in what is now northeastern Afghanistan. It is now produced industrially by heating aluminosilicates with sulfur. It is widely used in coloring plastics. paints, laundry applications, cosmetics, and toys. The 1990 estimated production was 20 000 tons.

It was the most expensive blue used by Renaissance artists (because it was imported from Afghanistan). It was often reserved for special purposes, such as painting the robes of the Virgin Mary. Johannes Vermeer used ultramarine only for the most important surfaces where he wanted to attract attention. Pietro Perugino, in his depiction of the Madonna and Child on the Certosa de Pavio Altarpiece, painted only the top level of the Virgin's robes in ultramarine, with azurite beneath.

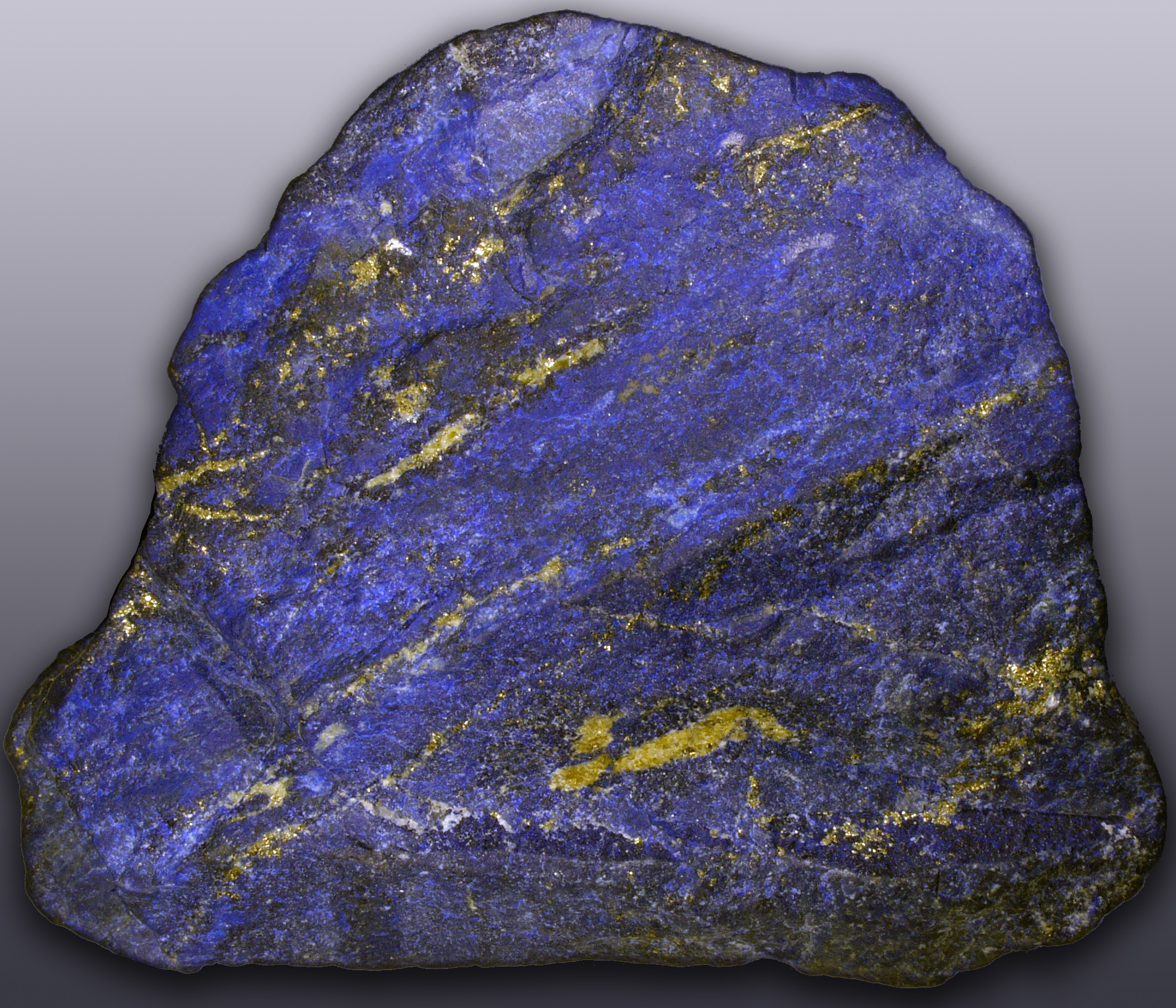
Lapis lazuli in its natural state

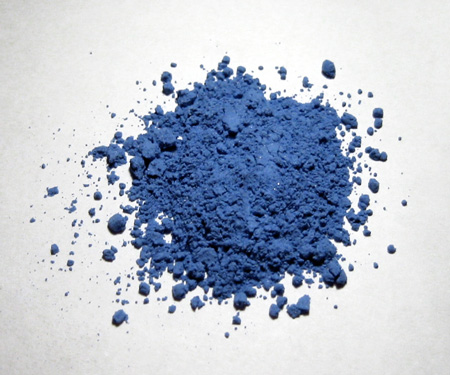
Natural ultramarine

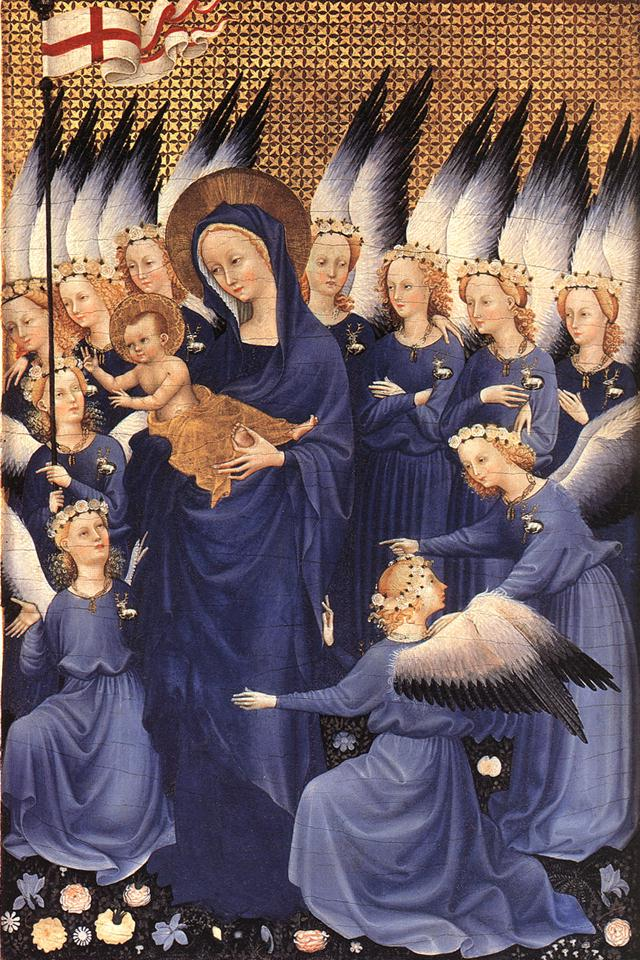
The Wilton Diptych (c. 1395–1399)
Unknown artist

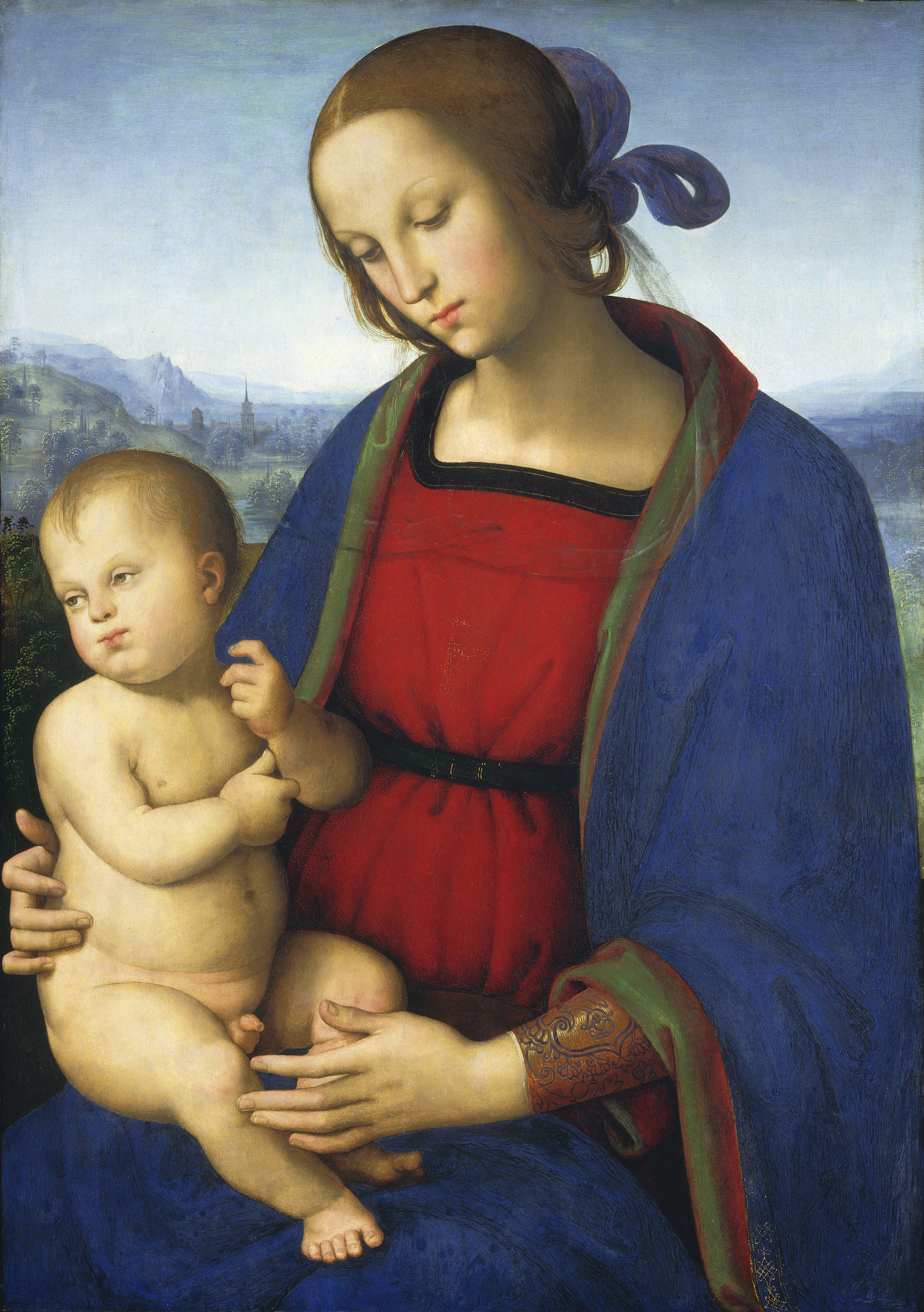
Detail from the Certosa di Pavia Altarpiece (c. 1496–1500)
Pietro Perugino

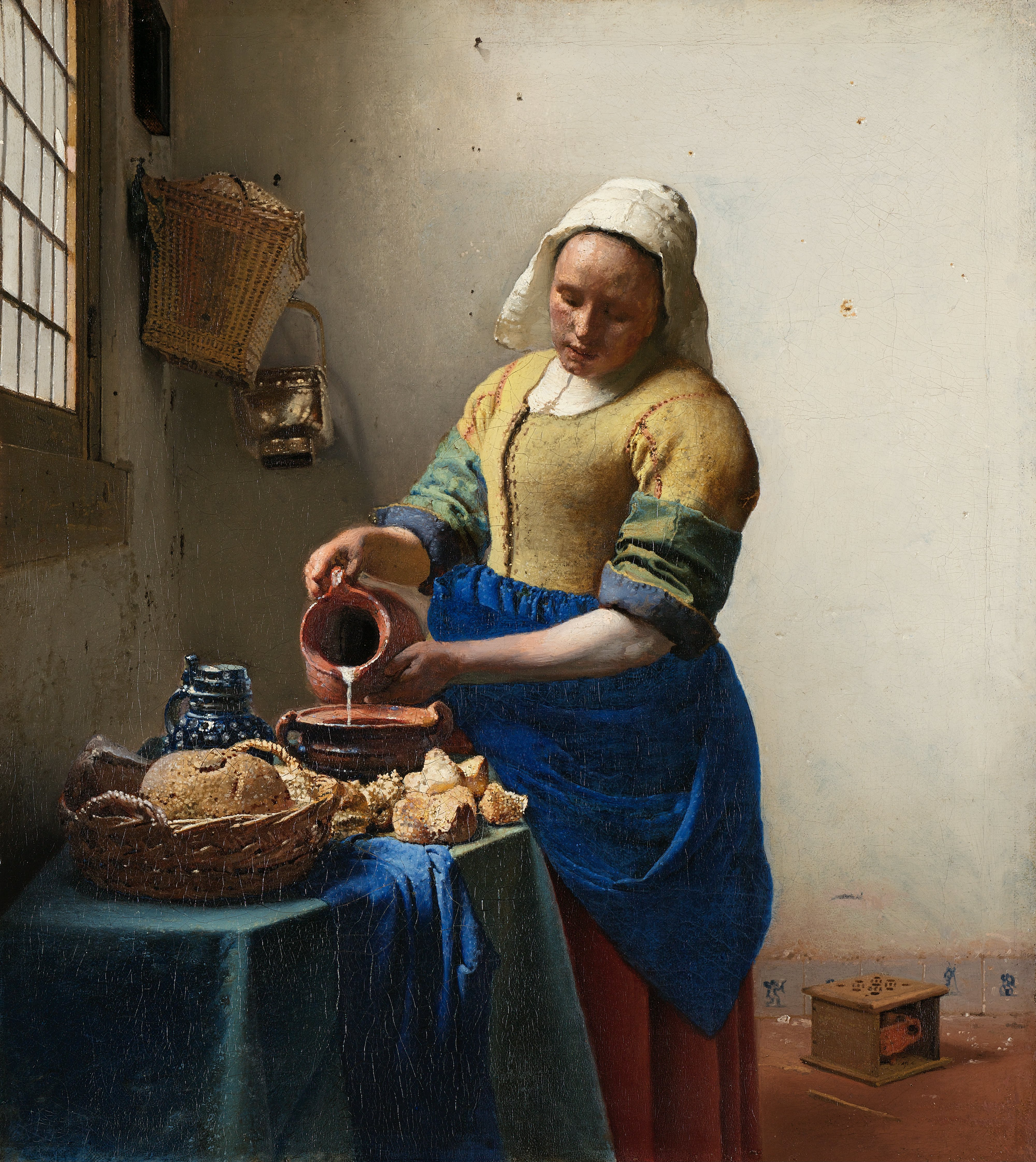
Het melkmeisje (1658)
Johannes Vermeer

Ultramarine became more widely used after its synthesis in the 19th century, which lowered its price substantially. Synthetic ultramarine was widely appreciated by the French impressionists, and Vincent van Gogh used both French ultramarine and cobalt blue for his painting The Starry Night (1889).

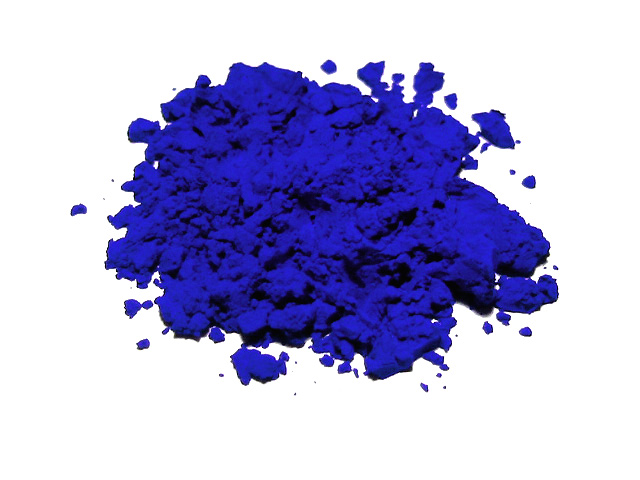
Synthetic ("French") ultramarine

The Starry Night (1899)
Vincent van Gogh

=== Cobalt blue ===
Cobalt blue is a synthetic blue pigment was invented in 1803 as a rival to ultramarine. It was made by the process of sintering, that is by compacting and forming a solid mass of material by heat or pressure without melting it to the point of liquefaction. It combined cobalt(II) oxide with aluminum(III) oxide (alumina) at 1200 °C. It was also used as colorant, particularly in blue glass and as the blue pigment used for centuries in Chinese blue and white porcelain, beginning in the late eighth or early ninth century.

Cobalt glass, or smalt, is a variation of cobalt blue. It is made of ground blue potassium glass containing cobalt blue. It was widely used in painting in the 16th and the 17th centuries. Smalt was popular because of its low cost; it was widely used by Dutch and Flemish painters, including Hans Holbein the Younger.

=== YInMn Blue ===
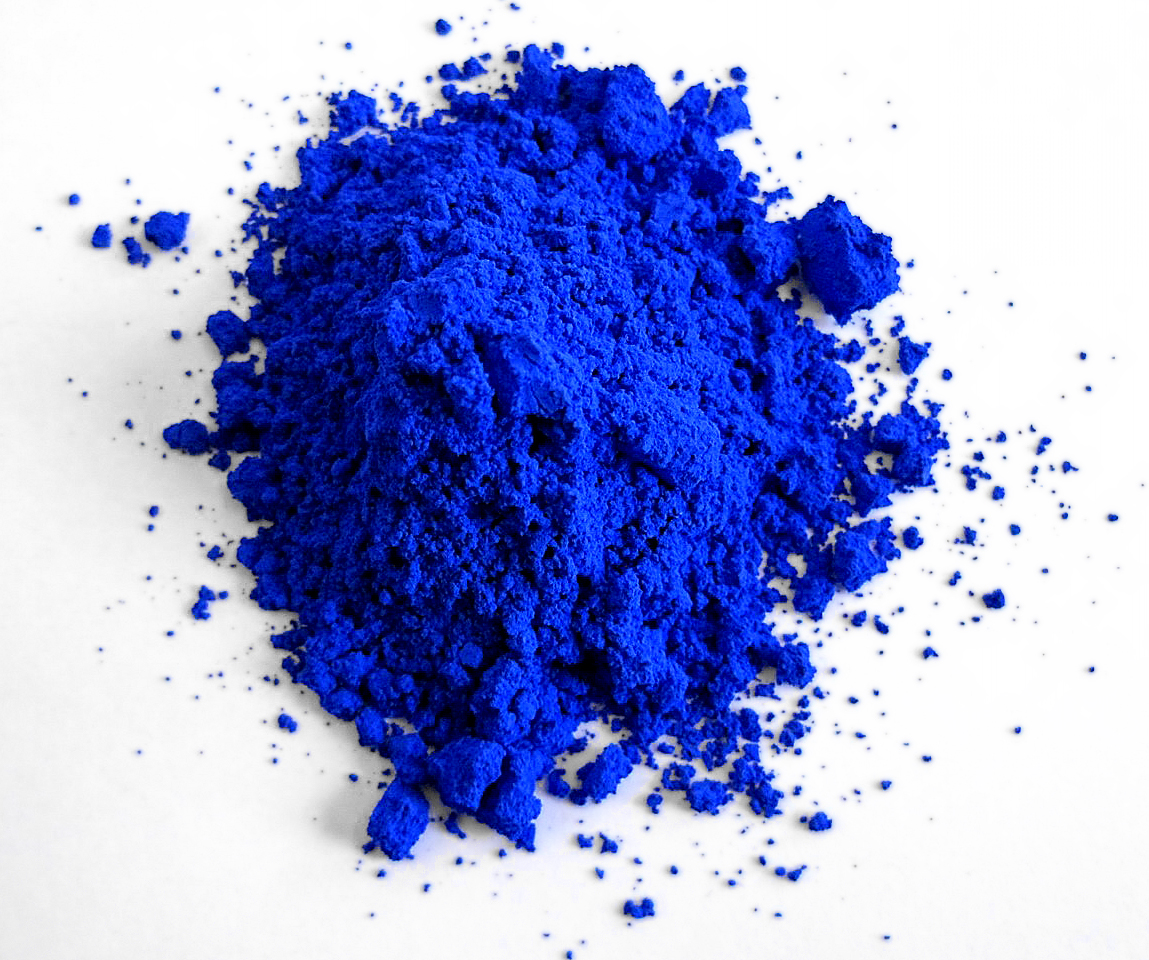
YInMn Blue

YInMn Blue is an inorganic pigment was discovered only in 2009. It has been used in water, oil, and acrylic paints from paint vendors.

== Obsolete, disused, and minor blue pigments ==
=== Egyptian blue ===
Egyptian blue was the first synthetic blue pigment. It was made from a mixture of silica, lime, copper salts, and an alkali. It was widely used in The Fourth Dynasty of ancient Egypt (c. 2613 to 2494 BC). Egyptian blue is responsible for the blue colour seen very commonly in Egyptian faience. It is no longer used.

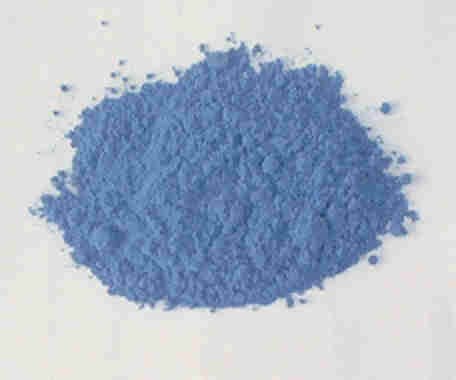
Egyptian blue

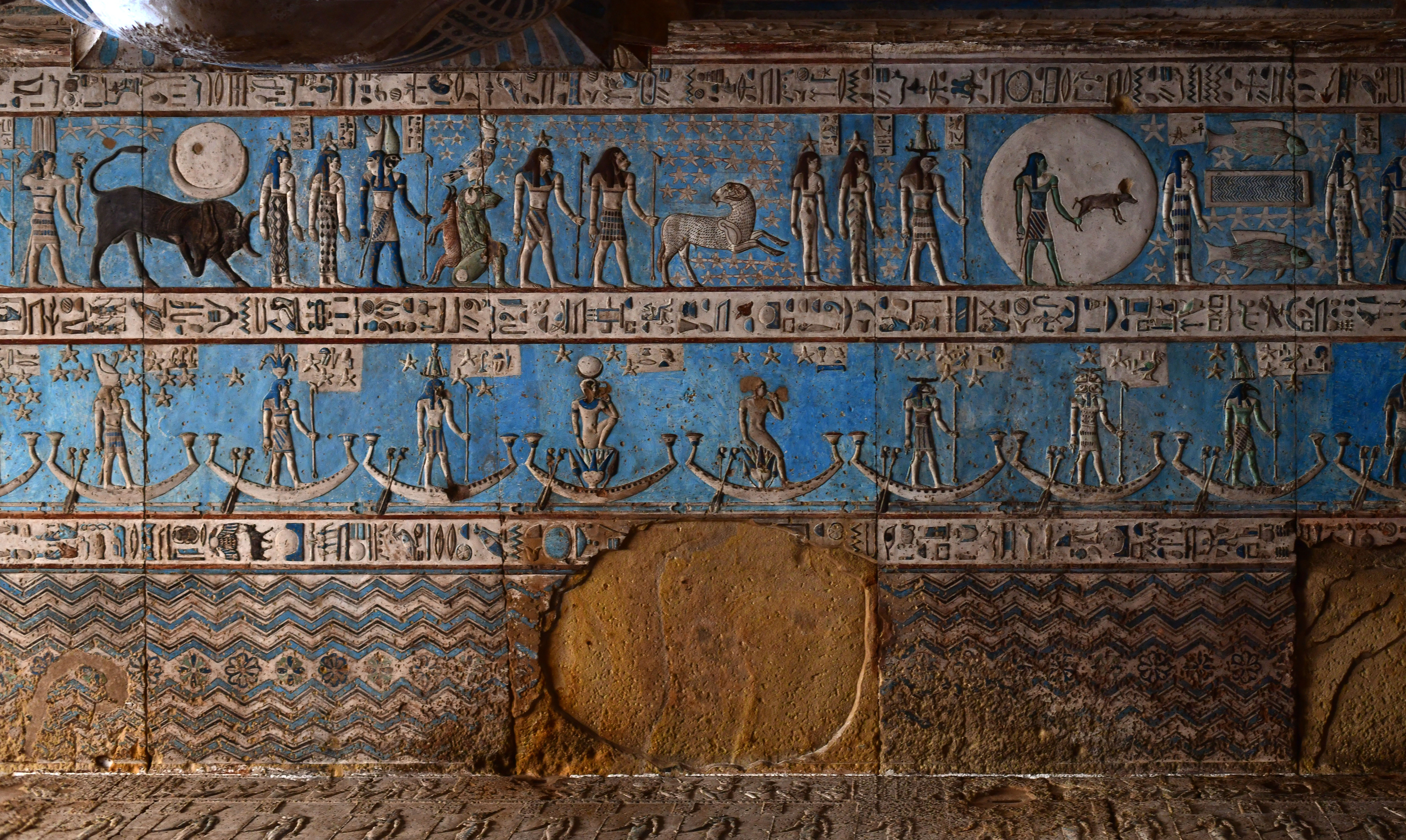
Temple of Hathor ceiling relief, Dendera (c. 22-21 BC)

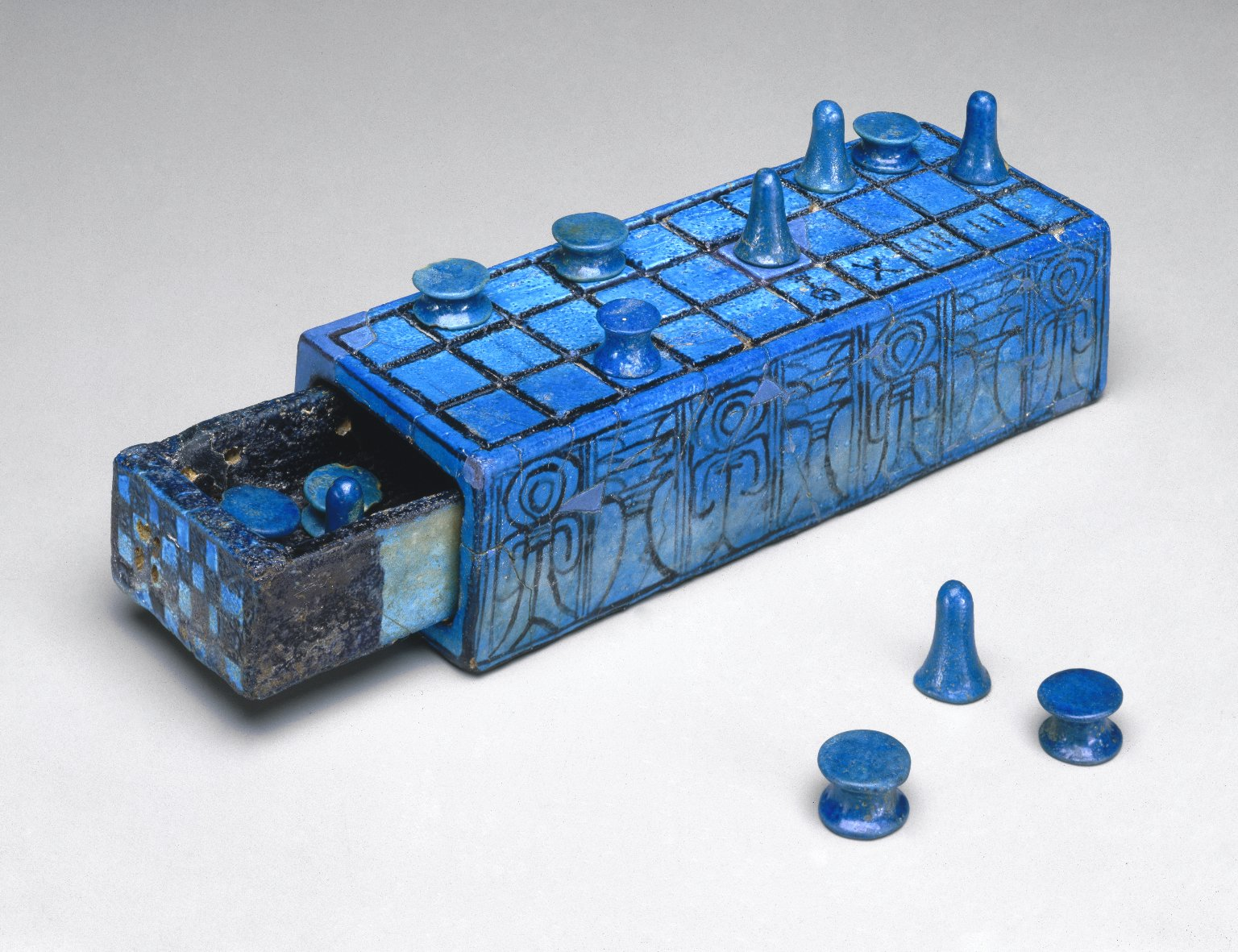
Faience senet board belonging to Amenhotep III (c. 1390-1353 BC)

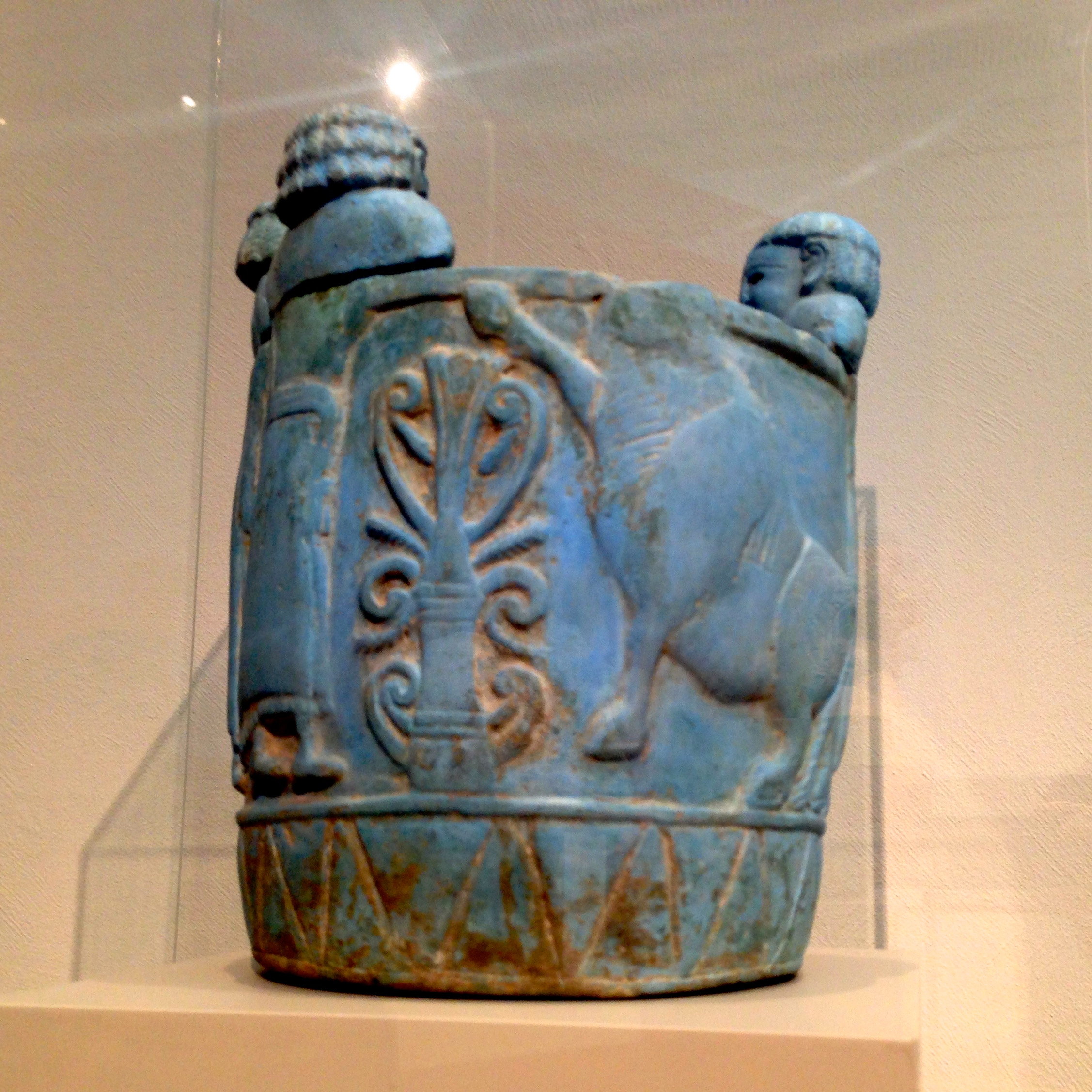
Faience pyxis from northern Syria (c. 750-700 BC)

=== Azurite ===
Azurite pigment is derived from the soft, deep-blue copper mineral of the same name, which forms from the weathering of copper ore deposits. It was mentioned in Pliny the Elder's Natural History under the Greek name kuanos (κυανός: "deep blue," root of English cyan) and the Latin name caeruleum. The modern English name of the mineral reflects this association, since both azurite and azure are derived via Arabic from the Persian lazhward (لاژورد), an area known for its deposits of another deep-blue stone, lapis. Azurite was often used in the Renaissance and later as a less expensive substitute for ultramarine. Lower layers would be painted in azurite, with the most visible portions painted in ultramarine. The drawback of the pigment is that it degrades and darkens over time.

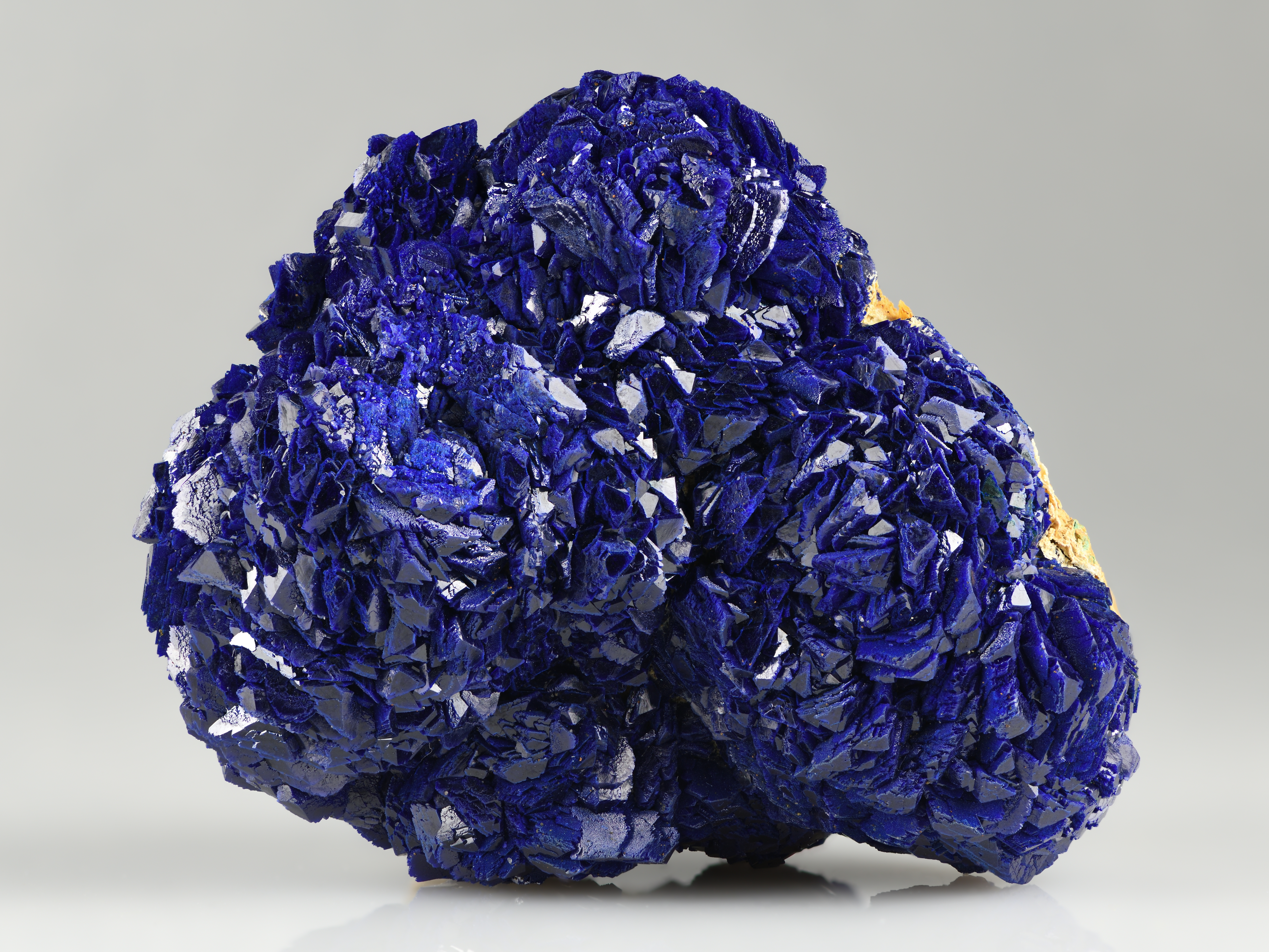
Azurite crystals found from La Sal Mountains, Utah

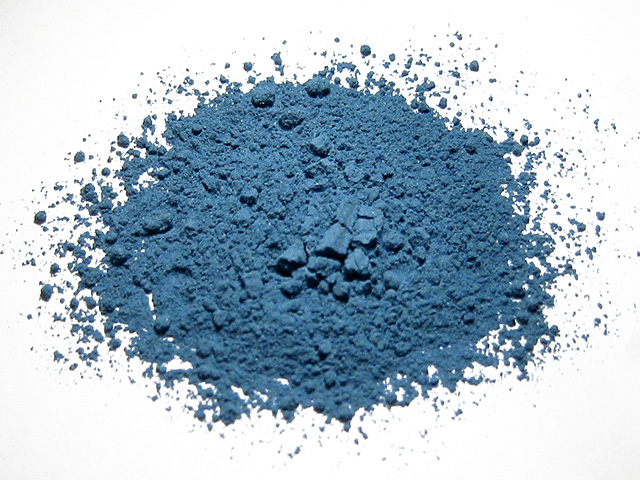
Azurite

Portrait of a Lady with a Squirrel and a Starling (c. 1526–1528)
Hans Holbein the Younger

=== Han blue ===
Han blue (also called Chinese blue) is a synthetic barium copper silicate pigment used in ancient and imperial China from the Western Zhou period (1045–771 BC) until the end of the Han dynasty (circa 220 AD). Han blue and the chemically related Han purple were used to decorate hu vessels during the Han dynasty, and were also used for mural paintings in tombs of the same period.

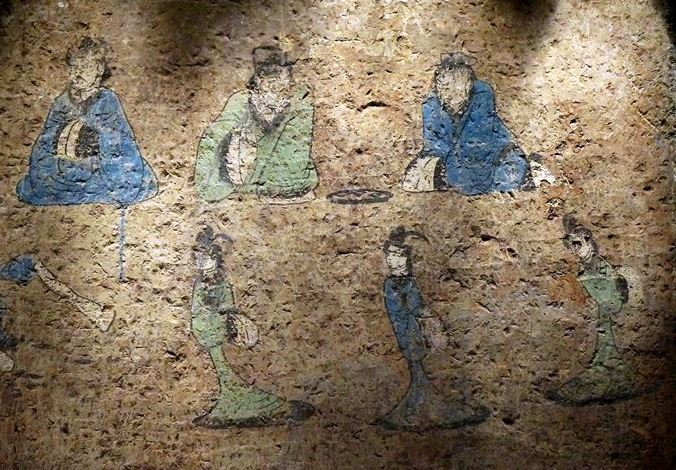
Figures in a Han dynasty tomb, painted with Han blue (Before 220 AD)

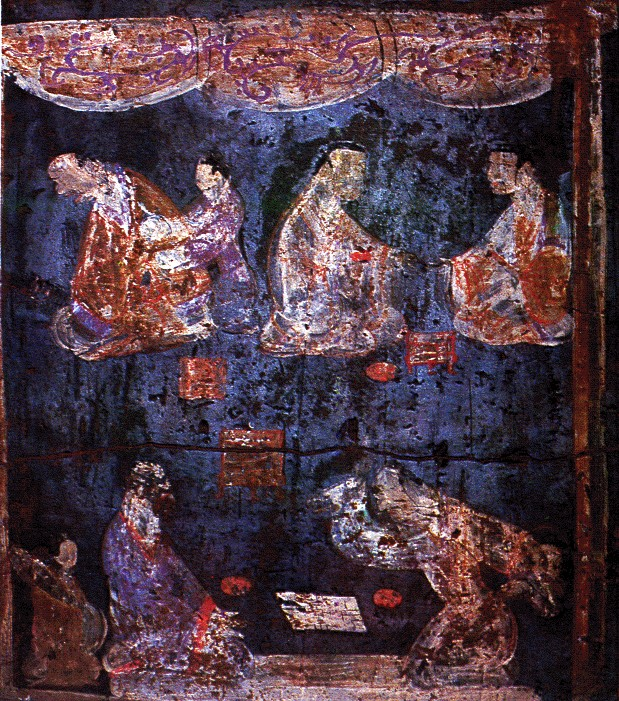
A mural from a Han dynasty tomb painted with both Han blue and Han purple
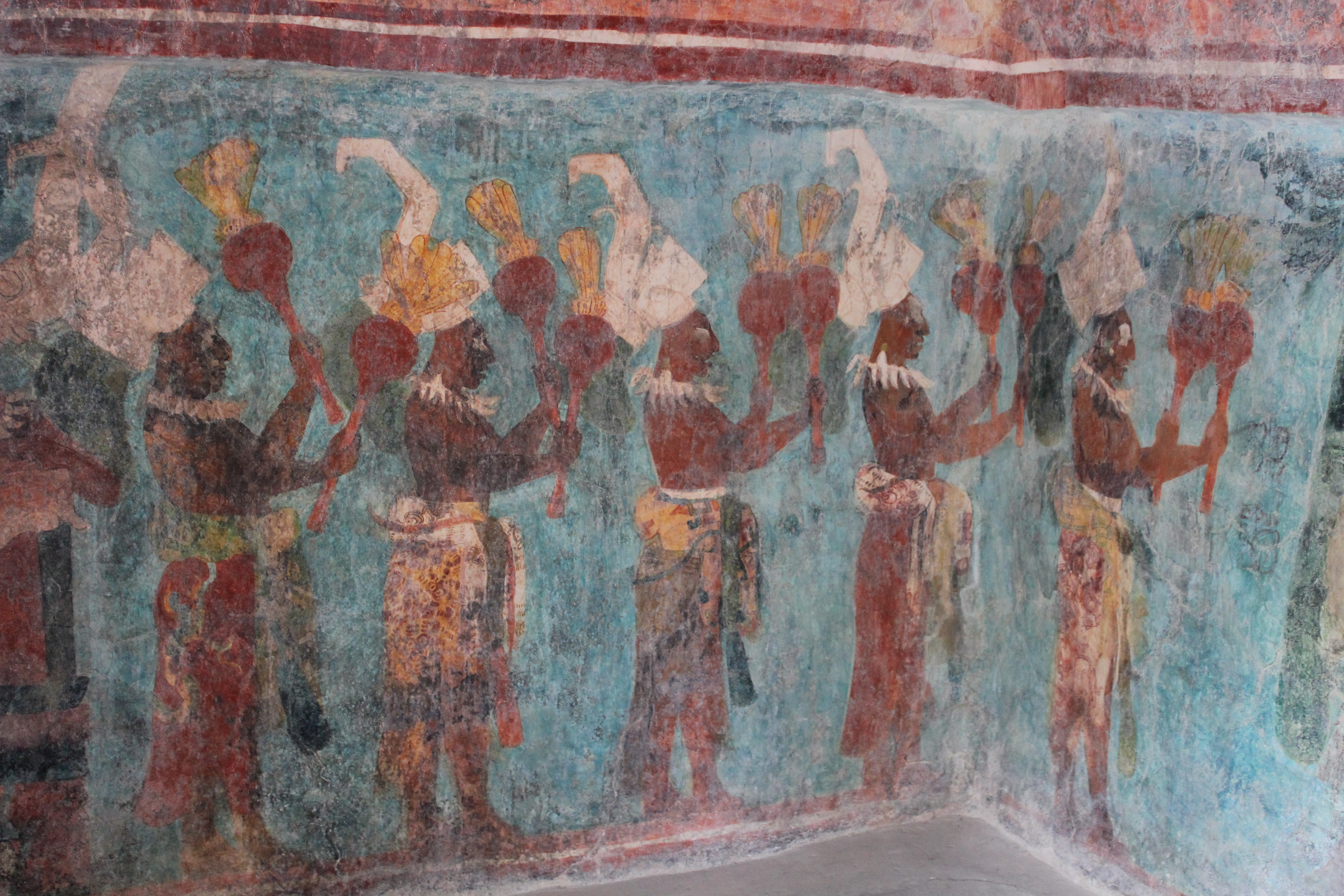
Fresco mural, Temple of the Murals at Bonampak (c. 790)

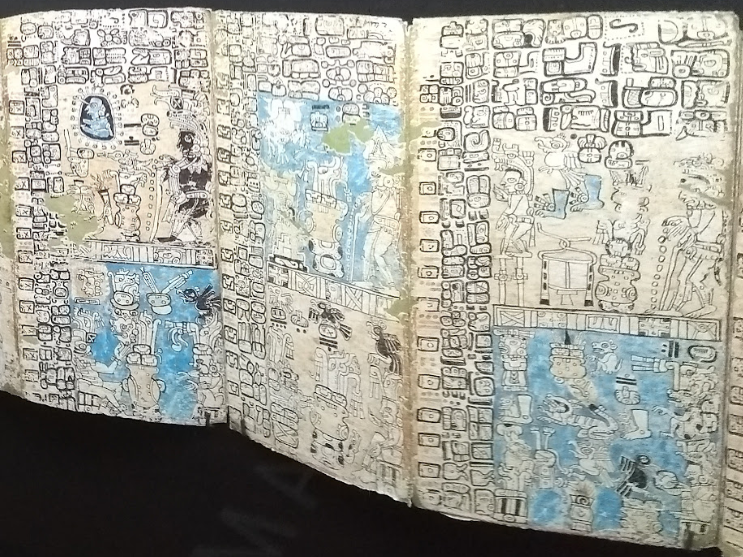
Pages 34–36 of the Madrid Codex (c. 1200–1500)

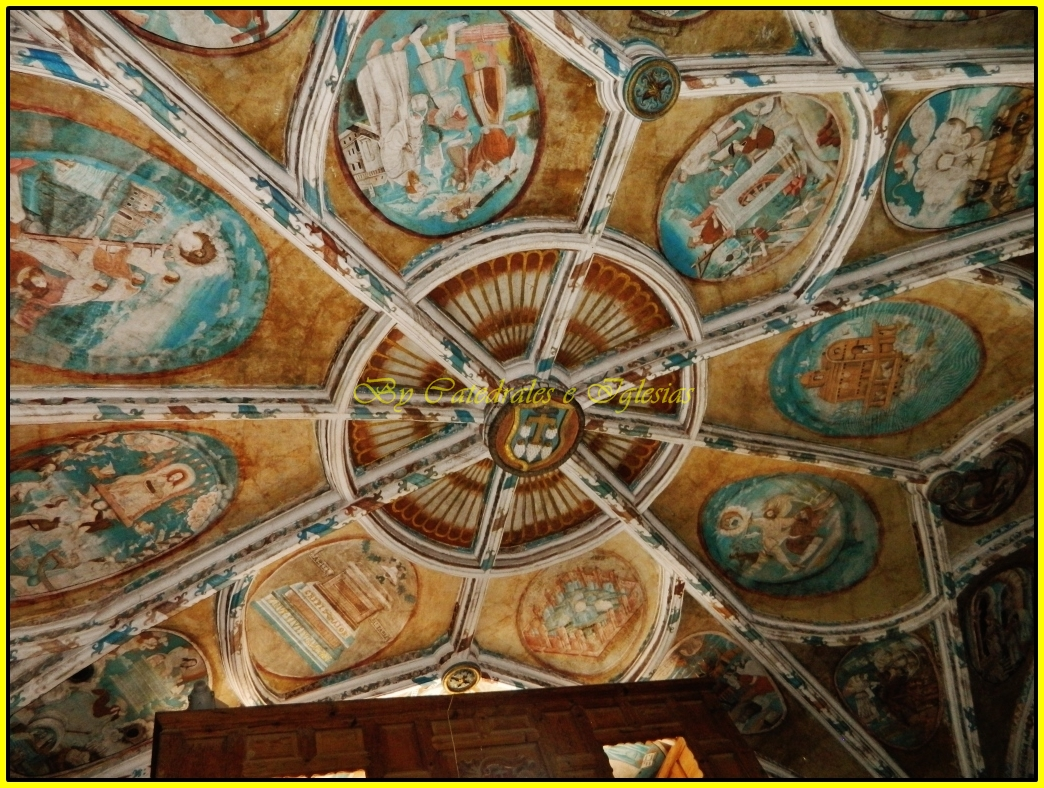
Ceiling mural at the Convento de la Asunción Tecamachalco, Puebla (1562)
Juan Gerson

=== Maya blue ===
Maya blue is a synthetic turquoise-blue pigment made by infusing indigo pigments (particularly those derived from the anil shrub) into palygorskite, a clay that binds and stabilises the indigo such that it becomes resistant to weathering. Developed in Mesoamerica in the first millennium AD, it saw wide use in the region, most prominently in the art of the Maya civilisation. It is known on media from pottery to murals to codices, and also played an important role in ritual sacrifices of both objects and people: silt at the bottom of the Sacred Cenote at Chichén Itzá is heavily stained with Maya blue, washed off the hundreds of sacrificial offerings cast into the cenote during the city's occupation. Maya blue continued to be used into the Spanish colonial period; though falling out of widespread use in the Maya region during the 16th century, some areas apparently continued to produce it for export, as Cuban colonial paintings of the 18th and 19th century have been found to make use of Maya blue probably imported from Campeche.

=== Cerulean blue ===
Cerulean blue was created in 1789 by the Swiss chemist Albrecht Höpfner. Subsequently, there was a limited German production under the name of Cölinblau. The primary chemical constituent of the pigment is cobalt(II) stannate (Co_{2}SnO_{4}).

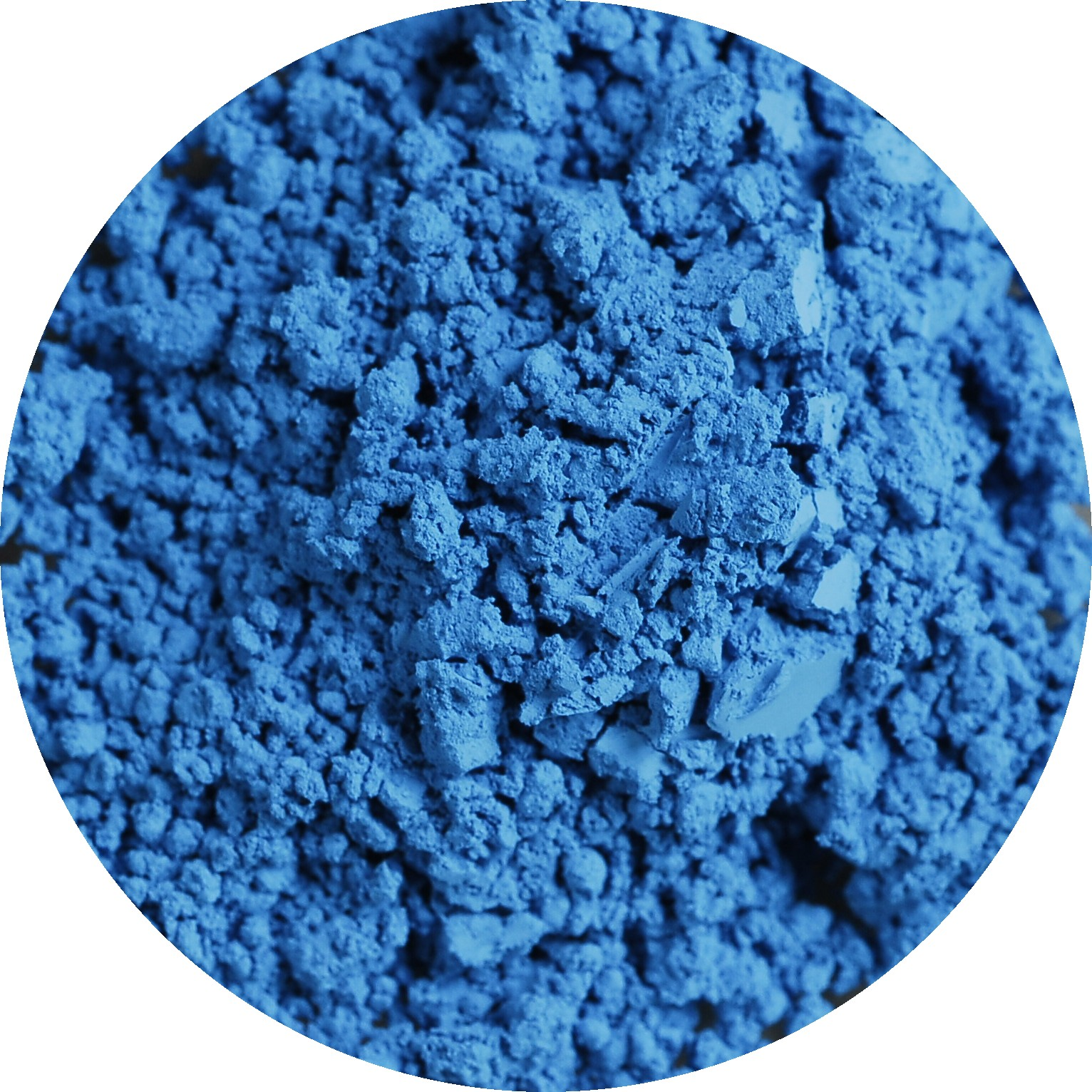
Cerulean blue

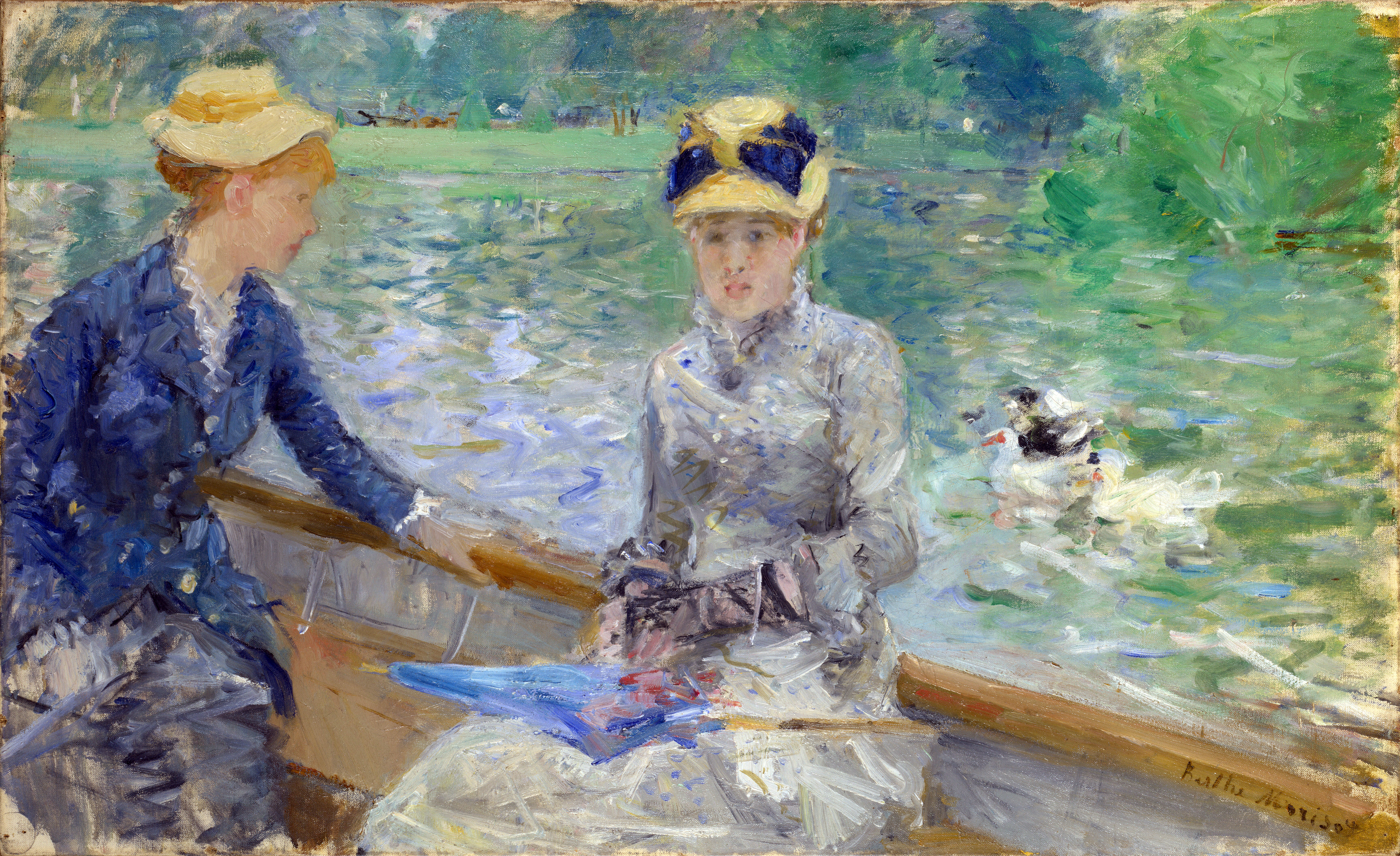
Jour d'été (Summer's Day) (1879)
Berthe Morisot

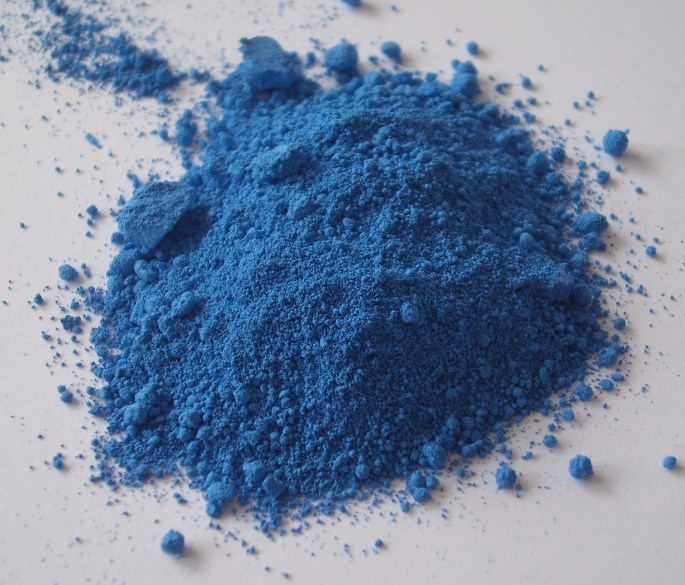
Cobalt blue

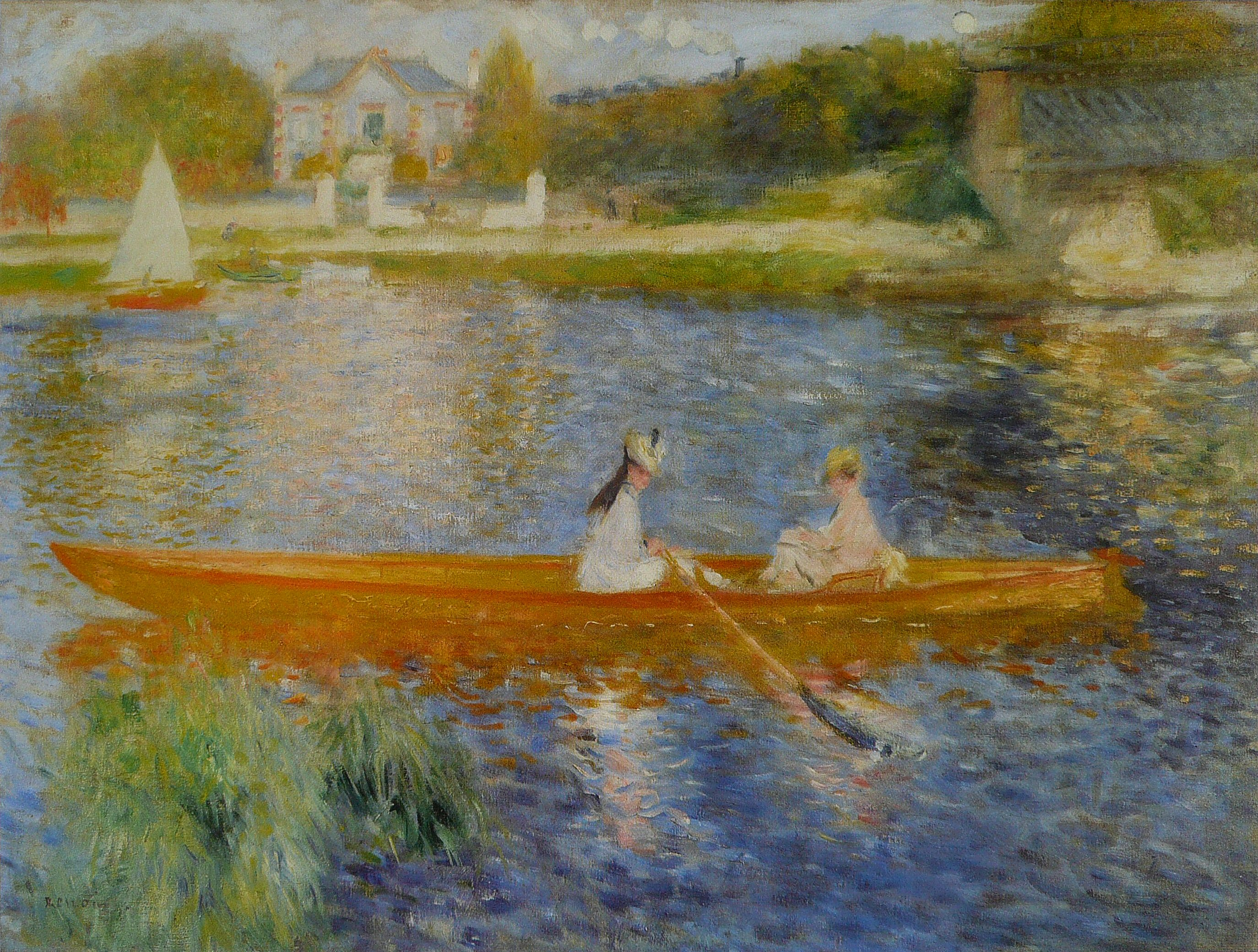
La Yole (Boating on the Seine) (c. 1879)
Pierre-Auguste Renoir

== See also ==
- List of inorganic pigments
- Anthocyanin
- Trichotomine

== Bibliography ==
- Pastoureau, Michel (2000). Bleu : Histoire d'une couleur (in French). Paris: Editions du Seuil. ISBN 978-2-02-086991-1.
- Varichon, Anne (2005). Couleurs : pigments et teintures dans les mains des peuples (in French). Paris: Editions du Seuil. ISBN 978-2-02-084697-4.
- Bomford, David; Roy, Ashok (2009). A Closer Look - Colour. London: National Gallery. ISBN 978-1857094428.
