= Han purple and Han blue =

Pigments developed in ancient China

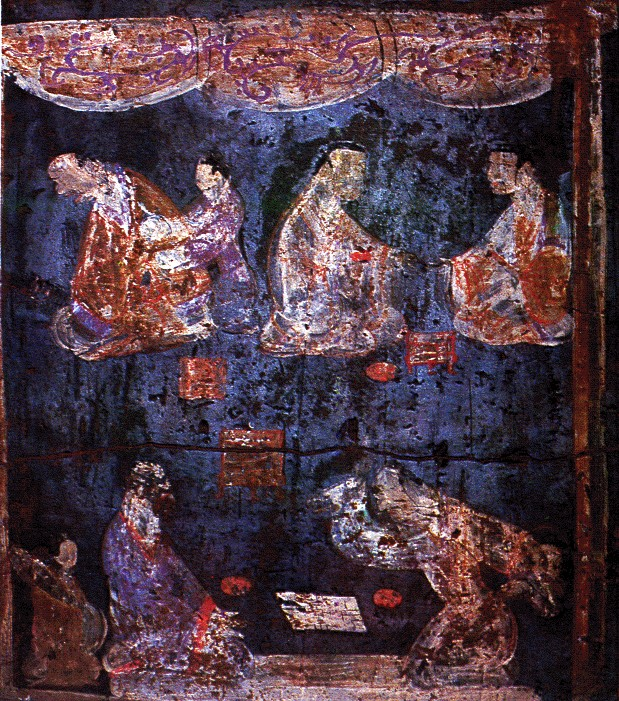
Detail of a mural from an Eastern Han tomb near Luoyang, Henan showing a pair of Liubo players, containing both Han blue and Han purple pigments

Han purple and Han blue (also called Chinese purple and Chinese blue) are synthetic barium copper silicate pigments developed in China and used in ancient and imperial China from the Western Zhou period (1045–771 BC) until the end of the Han dynasty (c. 220 AD).

== Color ==
Azurite was the only natural blue pigment used in early China. Early China seems not to have used a natural purple pigment and was the first to develop a synthetic one.

Han blue in its pure form is, as the name suggests, blue.

Han purple in its pure form is actually a dark blue, that is close to indigo. It is a purple in the way the term is used in colloquial English, i.e., it is a color between red and blue. It is not, however, a purple in the way the term is used in color science, i.e. a nonspectral color between red and violet on the 'line of purples' on the CIE chromaticity diagram. Perhaps the most accurate designation for the color would be to call it 'Han indigo', although it could also be regarded as a bright shade of ultramarine (classifying ultramarine as a color and not a pigment).

The purple color seen in samples of Han purple is created by the presence of red copper (I) oxide (Cu_{2}O) which is formed when Han purple decomposes (the red and blue making purple). The decomposition of Han purple to form copper (I) oxide is

3 BaCuSi_{2}O_{6} → BaCuSi_{4}O_{10} + 2 BaSiO_{3} + 2 CuO

Above 1050 °C, the CuO copper (II) oxide breaks down to copper (I) oxide:

4 CuO → 2 Cu_{2}O + O_{2}

== Chemistry ==
Both Han purple and Han blue are barium copper silicates (containing barium, copper, silicon, and oxygen). However, they differ in their formula, structure, and chemical properties.

=== Chemical formula and molecular structure ===
==== Han purple ====
Han purple has the chemical formula BaCuSi_{2}O_{6}.

Han purple has a layered structure with isolated 4-ring silicates, and contains a copper-copper bond which makes the compound more unstable than Han blue (metal-metal bonds are rare).

==== Han blue ====
Han blue has the chemical formula BaCuSi_{4}O_{10}. In 1993, it was discovered to occur naturally as the rare mineral effenbergerite, named after the Austrian mineralogist Herta Effenberger.

Han blue, like Han purple, has a layered structure with silicate forming the structural framework. However, Han blue is more stable because of structural features such as

- It is more silica-rich.
- Each four-ring silicate is linked to four others in the adjacent level, in a zig-zag pattern.
- The copper ions are very strongly contained within the stable silicate structure.

=== Chemical and physical properties ===
Han purple and blue are similar in many of their physical properties, which allow them to be mixed, but they differ in their chemical properties.

==== Exotic properties and applications to superconductivity and quantum computing research ====
In 2006 scientists at Stanford, Los Alamos National Laboratory and the Institute for Solid State Physics (University of Tokyo), showed that Han purple "loses a dimension" under suitable conditions when it enters a new state, as a Bose-Einstein Condensate. The researchers noted that

"We have shown, for the first time, that the collective behavior in a bulk three-dimensional material can actually occur in just two dimensions. Low dimensionality is a key ingredient in many exotic theories that purport to account for various poorly understood phenomena, including high-temperature superconductivity, but until now there were no clear examples of 'dimensional reduction' in real materials," said Ian Fisher

Other research team members alluded to potential applications to quantum computing. In conventional computers, electron charges transport information, but electron spin might in the future play a similar role in "spintronic" devices:

"Spin currents are capable of carrying far more information than a conventional charge current—which makes them the ideal vehicle for information transport in future applications such as quantum computing," stated first author Suchitra Sebastian. Noted Fisher: "Our research group focuses on new materials with unconventional magnetic and electronic properties. Han Purple was first synthesized over 2,500 years ago, but we have only recently discovered how exotic its magnetic behavior is. It makes you wonder what other materials are out there that we haven't yet even begun to explore."

==== Han purple ====
Han purple is chemically and thermally less stable than Han blue. It fades and decomposes in dilute acid. Han purple starts to decompose at temperatures more than 1050–1100 °C and forms a green-black glass at around 1200 °C. It becomes more purplish when ground.

==== Han blue ====
Han blue is more chemically and thermally stable. It does not break down in dilute acids, and becomes more bluish when ground.

== Manufacture ==
Manufacturing depends on the raw materials, their ratios, fluxes, temperature, atmosphere, and reaction time.

Production seems to have been focused in northern China, around 200–300 km (120–190 mi) north of the city of Xi'an. This is the area with large deposits of raw materials. No written records have been found about the production of Han purple or Han blue, so information about manufacture has been achieved through experimentation.

=== Raw materials ===
The raw materials needed are a barium mineral, quartz, a copper mineral, and a lead salt. It is unknown whether minerals were used in their natural form or were treated, though no evidence exists as yet of treatment.

The barium source was either witherite (BaCO_{3}) or baryte (BaSO_{4}). The rarity of witherite may favor baryte as the most likely source. Baryte has a slower decomposition rate and so favors Han blue production. Witherite conversely favors Han purple. In the use of baryte, lead salts (lead carbonate or lead oxide) would have been needed to increase yield. Lead has been detected in association with Han purple and Han blue.

Lead acts as a catalyst in the decomposition of barium minerals and as a flux. The amount of lead is important. Too much lead (more than 5%) causes partial melting and glass formation above 1000 °C.

The role of lead is:

BaSO_{4} + PbO ⇌ PbSO_{4} + BaO

=== The manufacturing process ===
The preparation of Han blue using malachite, silica and witherite as raw minerals also releases carbon dioxide and water vapor as by-products according to the following reaction:

Cu_{2}(CO_{3})(OH)_{2} + 8 SiO_{2} + 2 BaCO_{3} → 2 BaCuSi_{4}O_{10} + 3 CO_{2} + H_{2}O

The solid-state reaction to produce barium copper silicates starts at roughly 900 °C. Han purple is formed fastest. Han blue forms when an excess of silica is present and a longer reaction time is allowed. Early Chinese manufacture generally produced a mixture of Han blue and Han purple particles in various ratios, but pure colors were sometimes manufactured. Han blue could have been brought to a melt, but Han purple does not form a homogeneous melt, so it would have had to use a sintering process.

Prolonged firing causes Han purple to break down and form Han blue:

3 BaCuSi_{2}O_{6} → BaCuSi_{4}O_{10} + 2 BaSiO_{3} + 2 CuO

The temperature needed to be high (around 900–1000 °C) and kept at that temperature for long periods. Han purple is thermally sensitive, so temperature control for producing Han purple needed to be fairly constant (± 50 °C). Han blue is thermally less sensitive. Under the right conditions, the manufacture of Han purple would have taken around 10–24 hours, while Han blue would have taken twice as long.

Temperature would have been controlled by testing of firing materials, the size, shape, and material of the kiln, and the control of the environment. Technology for achieving and maintaining high temperatures would have been known from metal and ceramic production e.g. the potential use of twin bellows as used in metal production.

== Comparison ==
Characteristics	Han purple	Han blue
Chemical formula (Oxide notation)	BaCuSi_{2}O_{6} (BaO·CuO·2SiO_{2})	BaCuSi_{4}O_{10} (BaO·CuO·4SiO_{2})
Minimum temperature for production	900 – 1000 °C	circa 1000 °C
Manufacture time	10 – 24 hours	20 – 48 hours
Decomposition temperature	1050 – 1100 °C	>1200 °C
Thermally stable?	No	Yes
Stable in acid?	No	Yes
Color increase when ground?	Yes	Yes

== History ==
=== Hypothesis on origin ===
Han blue and Egyptian blue have the same basic structure and have very similar properties. The main difference is that Egyptian blue (CaCuSi_{4}O_{10}) has calcium in the position of Han blue's barium (BaCuSi_{4}O_{10}). The similarity led some to suggest that Han blue was based on Egyptian blue knowledge, which had traveled east along the Silk Road. Independent innovation in China would still have been needed to replace calcium with barium (the Han pigments start to form at 100 – 200 °C higher than the Egyptian blue).

The two hypotheses underlying the speculations about the exact chronology of the invention of these blue pigments can be summarized as follows:

- That earlier alkali metal glazing techniques were based on knowledge from Egypt, but that the copper silicate pigments (Egyptian blue and Han blue) developed from these glazes in two independent areas: Egypt and China.
- Alternatively, that examples of Han blue predate the official Silk Road and therefore that development was completely independent.

=== Chinese invention ===
The case against links with Egyptian blue includes the absence of lead in Egyptian blue and the lack of examples of Egyptian blue in China.

The use of quartz, barium, and lead components in ancient Chinese glass and Han purple and Han blue has been used to suggest a connection between glassmaking and the manufacture of pigments, and to argue for independent Chinese invention. Taoist alchemists may have developed Han purple from their knowledge of glassmaking.

The lead is used by pigment maker to lower the melting point of the barium in Han Purple.

The increase and decrease of barium glasses, and Han purple and Han blue, follow similar patterns. Both peaked in the Han dynasty, declining afterwards. Pre-Han to Tang dynasties see a shift from lead-barium-silicate type glass to lead-soda-lime glass. The reason for decline is debatable. Liu et al. attribute the decline to the decline of Taoism when Confucianism was introduced, since they link pigment manufacture to the ideology of Taoism. Berke (2007) believes that political changes stopped the distribution of the pigments as the Chinese Empire was split at the end of the Han period.

== Uses in cultural contexts ==
Han blue seems to have been favored in earlier (Zhou) periods, and Han purple in later periods (circa 400 BC).

The Han pigments consist of varying combinations of blue, purple and colorless components. The grinding together of Han purple and Han blue would have allowed a variety of blue-purple shades.

The pigments were used for:

- Beads (from late Western Zhou period (1201–771 BC))
- Octagonal sticks (from Warring States period)
- The Terracotta Army (Qin dynasty)
- Painted figurines (Han dynasty)
- Ceramic vessels (Han dynasty)
- Metal objects (Han dynasty)
- Wall paintings (Han dynasty)

=== Beads ===
Some of the earliest examples of the use of the Han pigments are beads which date back to the Western Zhou period. The pigments are either present as compact bodies or in glazed layers.

=== Octagonal sticks ===
These are compact bodies (solid sticks/rods) with shades ranging from light blue to dark purple. The range of colors is due to varying proportions of Han blue, Han purple, and colorless material. They are thought to be pigment sticks which were traded then ground to be used as pigment bases in paints. They may have been of importance themselves, as ceremonial or bureaucratic items of importance.

=== Terracotta army ===
Han purple and Han blue were first used in paints in the Qin dynasty. Han purple was used for the Terracotta Army in the tomb of Emperor Qin Shi Huang—the expense of producing Han purple and other pigments in such large quantities would have emphasized luxury and status. Han purple seems to have mostly been used on the trousers (pants) of the warriors. The pigment was bound to the terracotta surface with lacquer. The warriors were fired at the same temperature as that needed for the manufacture of Han purple (950–1,050 °C [1,740–1,920 °F]), so the same kilns may have been used for both processes. No evidence indicates Han blue being used for the warriors (azurite was used for the blue).

=== Painted pottery figurines ===
Smaller painted pottery figurines have been found e.g. the Western Han dynasty Chu Tombs, Xuzhou, Jiangsu Province and in the Han dynasty Yangling tombs of Emperor Liuqi and his Empress (156–141 BC).

=== Ceramic vessels ===
Han blue and Han purple were used to decorate Han dynasty Hu dark grey pottery vessels.

=== Metal objects ===
Bronze vessels in the Han dynasty, e.g. a bowl and top of a steamer, were decorated with Han purple.

=== Wall paintings ===
- A lintel and pediment from a Han dynasty tomb near Luoyang were painted with a light blue pigment consisting of blue, purple, and colorless components.
- An Eastern Han-period tomb mural painting in the Xi'an area is one of the last examples of the use of synthetic barium copper silicate pigments (Han purple).

== Preservation ==
Due to the instability of Han purple, it shows significant signs of weathering on archaeologically excavated artifacts. The copper(I) oxide formed in the decomposition of Han purple (see section on color) remains stable, but Han purple continues to deteriorate, and its purple color increases with time.

Han purple fades in acid, so colorless particles found in pigments containing Han blue and Han purple may be particles which were originally purple, but which faded in acidic conditions in burial. In addition, Han blue has fungicidal properties, so preserves better. Han purple reacts with oxalic acid to form BaCu(C_{2}O_{4})_{2}. The light blue color of this coordination polymer may explain the light blue color of some of the Terracotta Warriors' trousers – the color resulting from the presence of oxalate-excreting lichens.

== Notes ==
Two other synthetic blue barium copper silicate compounds have been found in trace amounts, but are as yet unnamed. They are

- BaCu_{2}Si_{2}O_{7} (blue color)
- Ba_{2}CuSi_{2}O_{7} (light blue color)

== See also ==
- Blue pigments
- Cobalt blue – Blue pigment
- Egyptian blue – Pigment used in ancient Egypt
- Maya blue – Azure blue pigment made in pre-Columbian Mesoamerica
- Persian blue – Blue colour associated with Persian pottery
- Prussian blue – Synthetic pigment
- Ancient Chinese glass – Glass made in China before the Qing dynasty (1644–1911)
- List of colors
- List of inorganic pigments
