= Effenbergerite =

Blue mineral

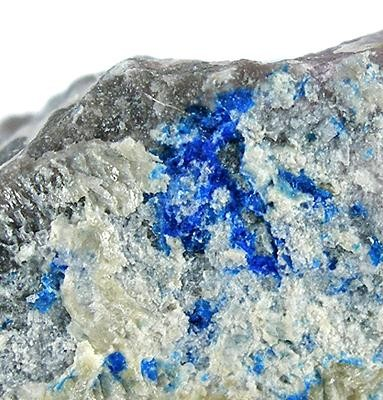

General
- Category: Minerals
- Formula: BaCuSi_{4}O_{10}
- Strunz classification: 09.EA.05
- Dana classification: 71.02.03.03
- Crystal system: tetragonal
- Crystal class: P4/ncc

Structure

Identification
- Formula mass: 473.21
- Colour: blue
- Luster: vitreous
- Streak: pale blue
- Diaphaneity: transparent
- Density: 3.57 - 3.52
- Optical properties: Uniaxial (-)
- Refractive index: e=1.593, w=1.633

Effenbergerite is the natural occurrence of the color Han blue. It was first found in the Wessels mine, Kalahari Manganese Field, South Africa.

Effenbergerite was approved as a valid mineral species by the IMA in 1993.

Effenberergite has the chemical formula BaCuSi_{4}O_{10}.

The mineral was named after Dr. Herta S. Effenberger, a mineralogist and crystallographer at the University of Vienna.
