= Maya blue =

Azure blue pigment made in pre-Columbian Mesoamerica

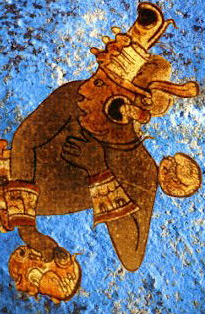
- A warrior with Maya blue on the background

Color coordinates
- Hex triplet: #73C2FB
- sRGB^{B} (r, g, b): (115, 194, 251)
- HSV (h, s, v): (205°, 54%, 98%)
- CIELCh_{uv} (L, C, h): (76, 66, 238°)
- Source: www.colorhexa.com/73c2fb
- ISCC–NBS descriptor: Light blue
- B: Normalized to [0–255] (byte)

Maya blue (Spanish: azul maya) is a unique bright turquoise or azure blue pigment manufactured by cultures of pre-Columbian Mesoamerica, such as the Mayas and Aztecs, during a period extending from approximately the 8th century to around 1860 CE. It is found in mural paintings on architectural buildings, ceramic pieces, sculptures, codices, and even in post-conquest Indochristian artworks and mural decorations.

The pigment is notable because of its chemical stability, vividness, and resistance to corrosion and weathering. Murals painted more than 1,000 years ago in Chichén Itzá, Bonampak and Cacaxtla, in what is today Mexico, have maintained their color, despite existing in one of the world's harshest climates.

== Manufacture ==
The Maya blue pigment is a composite of organic and inorganic constituents, primarily indigo dyes derived from the leaves of anil (Indigofera suffruticosa, called ch'oj in Mayan) plants combined with palygorskite, a natural clay and type of fuller's earth. Palygorskite is most common in the Southern United States, but is not known to exist in abundant deposits in Mesoamerica. Smaller trace amounts of other mineral additives have also been identified.

== Historical use ==
Maya blue first appeared around 800, and it was still used in the 16th century in several Convents of Colonial Mexico, notably in the paintings of the indigenous Nahua painter Juan Gerson in Tecamachalco. These paintings are a clear example of the combination of indigenous and European techniques sometimes known as Arte Indocristiano. After that, the techniques for its production were lost in Mexico, but in Cuba there are examples from as late as 1830.

== Resistance to weathering ==
Despite time and the harsh weathering conditions, paintings coloured by Maya blue have not faded over time. The color has resisted chemical solvents and acids such as nitric acid. Its resistance against chemical aggression (acids, alkalis, solvents, etc.) and biodegradation was tested, and it was shown that Maya blue is an extremely resistant pigment, but it can be destroyed using very intense acid treatment under reflux.

Because of its exceptionally durable colour properties, Maya Blue is an iconic system that led to paleo-inspired chemistry, i.e. the recreation of new pigments such as Maya Violet which exploits the molecular structure of Maya Blue towards new pigment combinations.

== Research on chemical composition ==
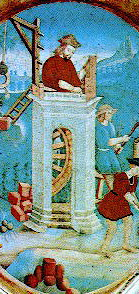
Mexican Colonial Painting by Juan Gerson where Maya blue was used

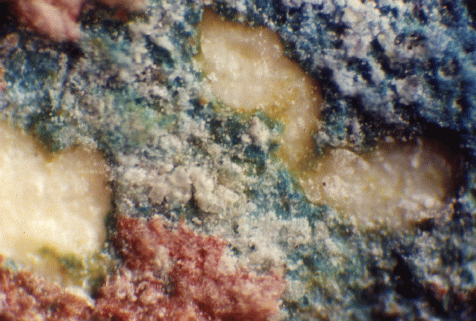
Microscopic image of a mural at Bonampak

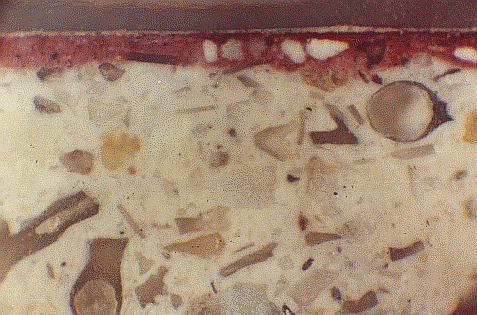
Microscopic image of a mural at Teotihuacan

The chemical composition of the compound was determined by powder diffraction in the 1950s and was found to be a composite of palygorskite and indigo, most likely derived from the leaves of the añil. An actual recipe to reproduce Maya blue pigment was published in 1993 by a Mexican historian and chemist, Constantino Reyes-Valerio. The combination of different clays (palygorskite and montmorillonite), together with the use of the leaves of the añil and the actual process is described in his paper. Reyes-Valerio's contributions were possibly due to his combined background of history and chemistry, through a thorough revision of primary texts (Sahagún, Hernandez, Jimenez, and others), microscopic analysis of the mural paintings and fourier transform infrared spectroscopy.

After the formula for the production was published in the book De Bonampak al Templo Mayor: Historia del Azul Maya en Mesoamerica, many developments in the chemical analysis of the pigment occurred in collaborations between Reyes-Valerio and European scientists.

A comprehensive study on the pigment which describes history, the experimental study techniques (diffraction studies, infrared spectroscopies, Raman amplification, optical spectroscopies, voltammetry, nuclear magnetic resonance, and computer modelling), the syntheses, properties and nature of Maya blue and the research in relation with the archaeological and historical contexts has been published in the journal Developments in Clay Science.

In 2008, researchers from Wheaton College discovered the production of Maya Blue was an integral component of the ancient rituals held at Chichén Itzá. Near a sacred natural sinkhole, indigo and palygorskite were combined through a heating process involving the burning of a mixture that included copal incense, palygorskite, and the leaves of the indigo plant. Subsequently, the individuals involved in the rituals were covered with the blue paint and thrown into the pit to please the rain god Chaak.

== Uses in cultural contexts ==
Pre-Columbian American culture

- In the Americas, Maya blue was used as a colorant in pre-Columbian artworks, sculptures, murals, and textiles (probably), and to illuminate Mesoamerican codices. For example, many illustrations in the Florentine Codex written by Bernardino de Sahagún contain the Maya blue color.
- The use of Maya blue was corroborated in the Grolier Codex, and helped to authenticate the document, now known as Codex Maya of Mexico.
- Recent research also suggests Maya blue may have played an important role in human sacrifices to Chaac at Chichén Itzá, both produced at the sacrificial site and used to paint the bodies of the victims.
- Maya blue is associated with the center of a flame. Holding the most heat and therefore the most tonalli, the blue color is considered precious.

== Gallery ==
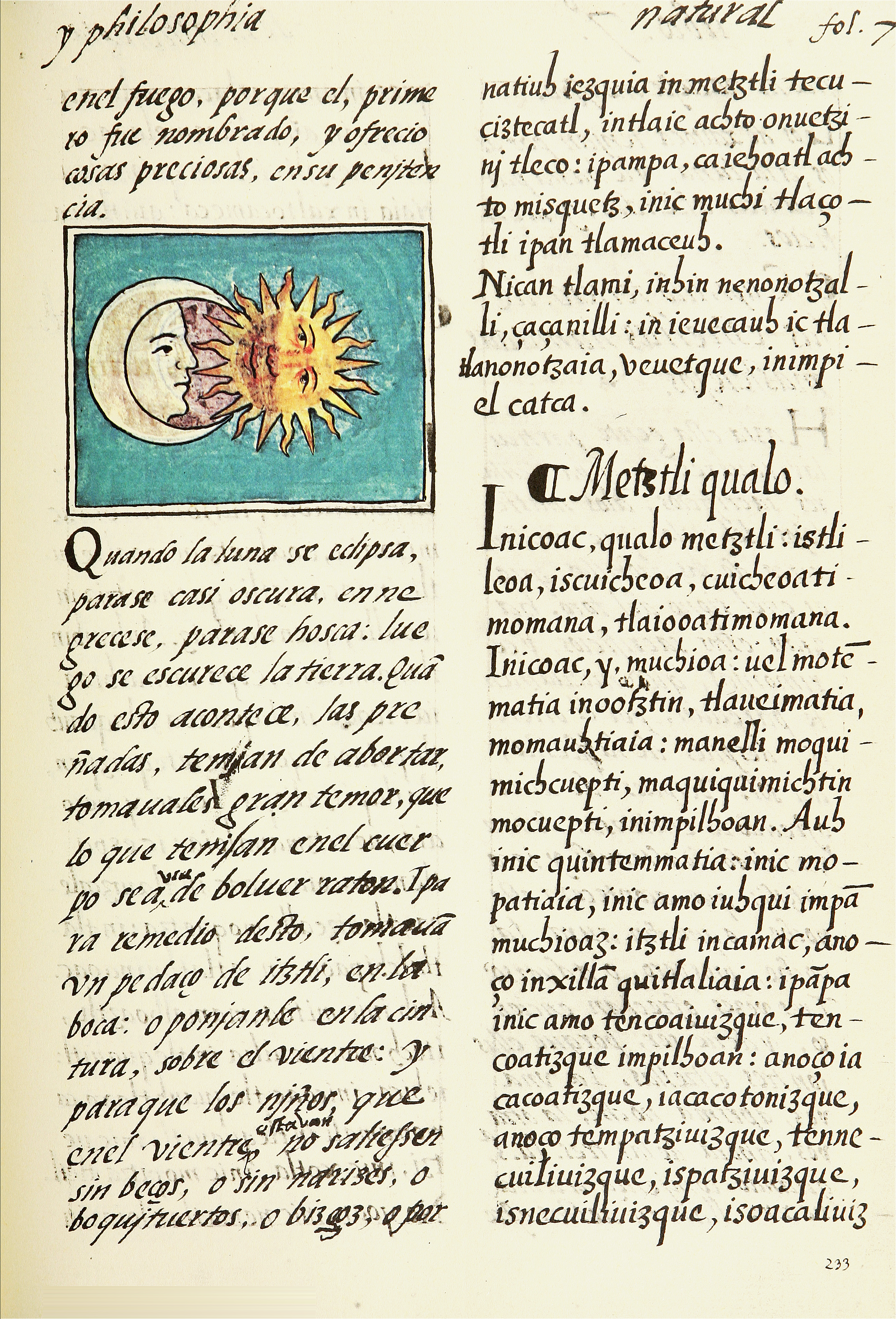
Maya blue used in the Florentine Codex fol. 227v

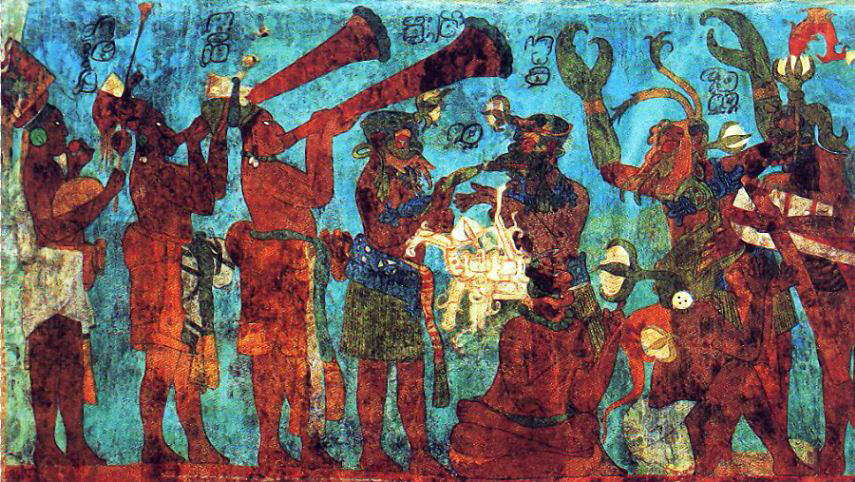
Bonampak mural

== See also ==
- Other classic artificial blue pigments: Egyptian blue, Chinese blue
