= Kaopectate =

Over-the-counter medication

Kaopectate is an orally taken medication for the treatment of mild diarrhea. It is also sometimes used to treat indigestion, nausea, and stomach ulcers. The active ingredients have varied over time, and are different between the United States and Canada. The original active ingredients were kaolinite and pectin. In Canada and Switzerland, the active ingredient is now Attapulgite, while in the US, the active ingredient is now bismuth subsalicylate (the same as in Pepto-Bismol).

== Ingredients ==
The active ingredient in Kaopectate has changed since its original creation. Originally, kaolinite was used as the adsorbent and pectin as the emollient. Attapulgite (a type of absorbent clay) replaced the kaolinite in the 1980s, but was banned by the U.S. Food and Drug Administration in a ruling made in April 2003. As a consequence, since 2004, bismuth subsalicylate has been used as the active ingredient in U.S. marketed products. In Canada, McNeil Consumer Healthcare continues to market Kaopectate using attapulgite as the active ingredient. However, Kaopectate was recalled in July 2021 in Canada because it may contain arsenic and lead beyond acceptable limits.

As of 2020, the US rights to Kaopectate are owned by Arcadia Consumer Healthcare (formerly Kramer Laboratories).

== Other animals ==
The U.S. Food and Drug Administration (FDA) does not have a clear stance on the administration of Kaopectate products on animals such as dogs and cats suffering from diarrhea. However, the Journal of the American Veterinary Medical Association Journal news article noted in 2003 that the new salicylate formulation might be harmful to cats. Kaolin-pectate, the original compound, was approved by the OTA (Organic Trade Association) for use in animals being produced for food.

== In popular culture ==
- Kaopectate is referenced in the Sugarhill Gang song Rapper's Delight.
- It is used and mentioned several times by the protagonist in the novel 11/22/63 by Stephen King.
- It is mentioned in the song Wicked Ways by Eminem.
- It is used to describe the colour of the sky in the novel Infinite Jest by David Foster Wallace.
- It is mentioned s2 ep.5 of Home Improvement.
- It is referenced in the poem "[Didn't Sappho say her guts clutched up like this?]" by Marilyn Hacker.
