= Palygorskite =

Magnesium aluminium phyllosilicate mineral

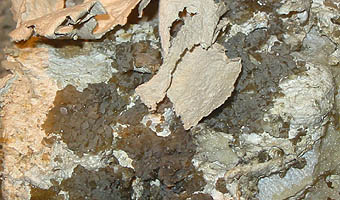
- A sample of palygorskite from Hnúšťa, Slovakia.

General
- Category: Phyllosilicate minerals
- Group: Palygorskite group
- Formula: (Mg,Al)_{2}Si_{4}O_{10}(OH)·4(H_{2}O) Al2Mg2◻2Si8O20(OH)2(H2O)4 · 4H2O
- IMA symbol: Plg
- Strunz classification: 9.EE.20
- Crystal system: Monoclinic, orthorhombic
- Crystal class: Prismatic (2/m) (same H-M symbol)
- Space group: B2/m and setting C2/m, P 2_{1} 2_{1} 2_{1}
- Unit cell: a = 12.78 Å, b = 17.86 Å, c = 5.24 Å; β = 95.78°; Z = 4

Identification
- Color: White, grayish, yellowish, gray-green
- Crystal habit: Commonly fibrous (asbestiform), tangled mats known as mountain leather. Individual, small crystals are lath-shaped
- Cleavage: Distinct/good, good on {110}
- Tenacity: Tough
- Mohs scale hardness: 2 – 2.5
- Luster: Waxy, earthy
- Diaphaneity: Translucent
- Specific gravity: 1 – 2.6
- Density: 2.1 - 2.6 g/cm3 (Measured); 2.35 g/cm3 (Calculated)
- Optical properties: Biaxial (−)
- Refractive index: n_{α} = 1.522 – 1.528 n_{β} = 1.530 – 1.546 n_{γ} = 1.533 – 1.548
- Birefringence: δ = 0.011 – 0.020
- Pleochroism: X= pale yellow Y=Z= pale yellow-green
- Common impurities: Fe,K

Palygorskite or attapulgite is a magnesium aluminium phyllosilicate with the chemical formula (Mg,Al)_{2}Si_{4}O_{10}(OH)·4(H_{2}O) that occurs in a type of clay soil common to the Southeastern United States. It is one of the types of fuller's earth and commonly occurs as a fibrous clay mineral. Some smaller deposits of this mineral can be found in Mexico, where its use is tied to the manufacture of Maya blue in pre-Columbian times. Unlike layered phyllosilicates such as smectites, palygorskite has a chain-like crystal structure (ribbons) consisting of continuous tetrahedral silica chains linked to octahedral sheets of magnesium and aluminum, each ribbon being linked to the next by inversion of SiO_{4} tetrahedra along a set of Si-O-Si bonds. This structural feature contributes to many of its peculiar physicochemical properties.

== Crystal structure ==
The crystal structure of palygorskite consists of continuous tetrahedral silica chains linked to octahedral sheets of magnesium and aluminum. Periodic inversion of the tetrahedral sheets produces elongated channels running parallel to the crystallographic axis. Water in palygorskite occurs in several forms, including adsorbed surface water, channel (zeolitic) water located within the channels, and structurally bound water associated with octahedral cations. These different forms of water are released at distinct temperature ranges during heating and influence the thermal stability and physicochemical characteristics of the mineral. Palygorskite belongs to the palygorskite–sepiolite group of fibrous phyllosilicates. Minerals in this group share a chain-like crystal structure composed of continuous tetrahedral silica chains linked to discontinuous octahedral sheets. Sepiolite is structurally similar but contains wider structural channels and exhibits a higher magnesium and lower aluminum content.

== Name ==
Palygorskite was first described in 1862 for a deposit at Palygorskaya on the Popovka River, Middle Urals, Permskaya Oblast, Russia. The synonym attapulgite is derived from the U.S. town of Attapulgus, in the extreme southwest corner of the state of Georgia, where the mineral is abundant and surface-mined. In modern mineralogical classification the term palygorskite is preferred by the Commission on New Minerals, Nomenclature and Classification (CNMNC) of the International Mineralogical Association (IMA), whereas the term attapulgite remains widely used in industrial and commercial contexts.

== Origin ==
Five processes for the genesis of palygorskite were discussed in the older literature:

1. Formation under arid conditions,
2. Formation connected with the weathering of basalt,
3. Hydrothermal genesis,
4. Synsedimentary (during sedimentary deposition) authigenesis,
5. Postsedimentary (following sedimentary deposition) formation.

Palygorskite typically forms in shallow lacustrine, fluvial, palustrine or pedogenic environments. Its formation is enhanced by semi-arid conditions characterized by high evaporation rates and alkaline waters enriched in magnesium and silica. These conditions are associated with geochemical redistribution of Mg, Si and Al under mildly alkaline conditions and crystallization from solutions with relatively high ionic strength. In some cases, palygorskite may also form through transformation of pre-existing Mg–Fe smectites, a process sometimes described as a “heritage” or transformation model.

== Mining and usage ==
=== Global deposits ===
Important palygorskite deposits occur in several parts of the world, including the southeastern United States (notably Georgia and Florida), Senegal, China, India, South Africa, Australia, and Greece. These deposits are of considerable economic importance due to the wide range of industrial, environmental, agricultural, construction, medical and consumer applications of palygorskite.

=== Mineral deposit in the US ===
Two companies are involved in the industrial extraction and processing of gellant-grade attapulgite clay within the same Attapulgus deposit: Active Minerals International, LLC, and BASF Corp. In 2008, BASF acquired the assets of Zemex Attapulgite, leaving only two gellant-grade producers. Active Minerals operates a dedicated factory to produce the patented product Actigel 208 and built a new state-of-the-art production process in early 2009 involving portable plant processing at the mine site.

=== Palygorskite deposits in Greece ===
In Greece, significant palygorskite deposits occur in the Ventzia Basin in the regional unit of Grevena, West Macedonia. The basin is a post-Alpine intramontane depression formed during the Upper Pliocene–Lower Pleistocene. The geological environment was characterized as fluvial and palustrine where semi-arid conditions led to high evaporation rates and alkaline waters enriched in silica and magnesium. Silica and magnesium derived from the weathering of ultramafic and mafic rocks of the Vourinos ophiolite complex and aluminum from mafic rocks and rocks from the Tsotyli Formation contributed to conditions favourable for the formation of fibrous clay minerals such as palygorskite. Several individual deposits occur within the basin, showing variations in the palygorskite-to-smectite ratio, porosity, associated mineral phases and chemical composition. These differences influence the physicochemical properties of the material and its suitability for different industrial applications. Industrial extraction and processing of palygorskite from deposits in the Ventzia Basin is carried out by Geohellas S.A..

=== Properties ===
Attapulgite clays are a composite of smectite and palygorskite. Smectites are expanding lattice clays, of which bentonite is a commonly known generic name for smectite clays. The palygorskite component is an acicular bristle-like crystalline form that does not swell or expand and typically exhibits a high specific surface area, ranging from about 75 to 400 m²/g depending on composition and processing. Attapulgite forms gel structures in fresh and salt water by establishing a lattice structure of particles connected through hydrogen bonds.

Attapulgite, unlike some bentonite (sodium-rich montmorillonites), can gel in seawater, forming gel structures in salt water and is used in special saltwater drilling mud for drilling formations contaminated with salt. Palygorskite particles can be considered as charged particles with zones of positive and negative charges. The bonding of these alternating charges allows them to form gel suspensions in salt and fresh water that remain stable over a broad pH range and in environments with high ionic strength.

Stabilization of nanopalygorskite suspensions was improved using mechanical dispersion (magnetic stirring, high-speed shearing and ultrasonication) and polyelectrolytes (carboxymethyl cellulose, alginate, sodium polyphosphate, and poly(sodium acrylate)) at different pH. Surface energy and nanoroughness were studied in a palygorskite sample.

When heated, palygorskite undergoes several distinct dehydration and structural transformation stages. Adsorbed surface water is removed at temperatures between approximately 25 and 120 °C. Channel or zeolitic water located within the structural channels is released between about 150 and 250 °C, accompanied by partial rearrangement of the channel structure. At temperatures between roughly 350 and 550 °C, partial collapse of the crystal structure occurs. Above approximately 650 °C, the structure transforms into amorphous silica–magnesium phases.

=== Environmental applications ===
Its high surface area and adsorption capacity make palygorskite suitable for environmental applications, including the removal of heavy metals such as copper and nickel from aqueous solutions and the treatment of industrial and agricultural wastewaters. It has also been investigated for the adsorption of inorganic ions such as nitrates and ammonium and for reducing the mobility of pollutants in soils.

=== Agricultural and livestock uses ===
In agriculture, palygorskite is used as a carrier for fertilizers and crop protection products and as a soil amendment that improves water retention, aeration and nutrient availability. It is also used in livestock production as a functional feed additive and as an absorbent material for animal bedding to reduce moisture and odours.

=== Industrial uses ===
Industrial uses of palygorskite include applications as a rheological modifier in drilling fluids, absorbents for liquid spills, and bleaching earth for the purification and decolorization of vegetable and mineral oils. ). Its adsorption properties have also been used in the treatment of industrial oils.

=== Consumer products ===
Palygorskite is also used in consumer products such as absorbent pet litter due to its ability to retain moisture and control odours.

=== Medical use ===
Attapulgite is used widely in medicine. Taken by mouth, it physically binds to acids and toxic substances in the stomach and digestive tract. Also, as an antidiarrheal, it was believed to work by adsorbing the diarrheal pathogen. For this reason, it has been used in several antidiarrheal medications, including Diar-Aid, Diarrest, Diasorb, Diatabs, Diatrol, Donnagel, Kaopek, K-Pek, Parepectolin, and Rheaban. It has been used for decades to treat diarrhea.

Until 2003, Kaopectate marketed in the US also contained attapulgite. However, at that time, the U.S. Food and Drug Administration retroactively rejected medical studies showing its efficacy, calling them insufficient. The manufacturer also settled with the State of California over toxic levels of lead in the attapulgite component. Part of this settlement was a reformulation to remove attapulgite in the liquid version in the US.

Kaopectate's U.S. formula was changed to bismuth subsalicylate (pink bismuth). The next year (2004), an additional change in labeling was made; from then on, Kaopectate was no longer recommended for children under 12 years old. Nevertheless, Kaopectate with attapulgite is still available in Canada and elsewhere. Until the early 1990s, Kaopectate used the similar clay product kaolinite with pectin (hence the name).

=== Construction ===
Palygorskite can be added to lime mortar with metakaolin for period-correct restoration of mortar at cultural heritage sites. Palygorskite has been proposed as a pozzolanic supplementary cementitious material. Its performance has been reported to be comparable to that of metakaolin, suggesting potential applications in more sustainable cement-based products.

=== In human culture ===
Palygorskite is known to have been a key constituent of the pigment called Maya blue, which was used notably by the pre-Columbian Maya civilization of Mesoamerica on ceramics, sculptures, murals, and (most probably) Maya textiles. The clay mineral was also used by the Maya as a curative for certain illnesses, and evidence shows it was also added to pottery temper.

A Maya region source for palygorskite was unknown until the 1960s, when one was found at a cenote on the Yucatán Peninsula near the modern township of Sacalum, Yucatán. A second possible site was more recently (2005) identified, near Ticul, Yucatán.

The Maya blue synthetic pigment was also manufactured in other Mesoamerican regions and used by other Mesoamerican cultures, such as the Aztecs of central Mexico. The blue coloration seen on Maya and Aztec codices, and early colonial-era manuscripts and maps, is largely produced by the organic-inorganic mixture of añil leaves and palygorskite, with smaller amounts of other mineral additives. Human sacrificial victims in postclassic Mesoamerica were frequently daubed with this blue pigmentation.

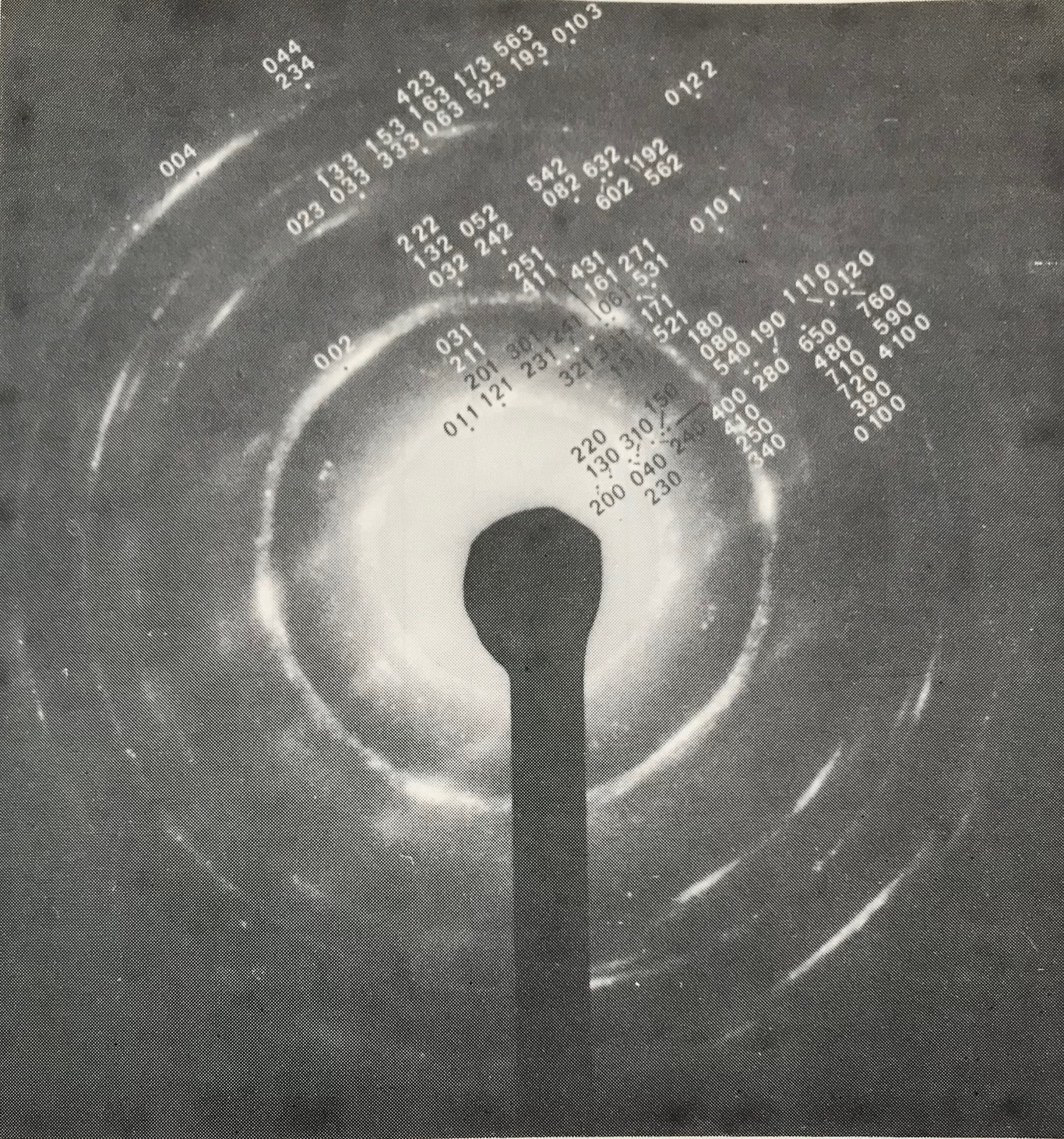
Electron diffractogram of palygorskite (Wiersma 1970).

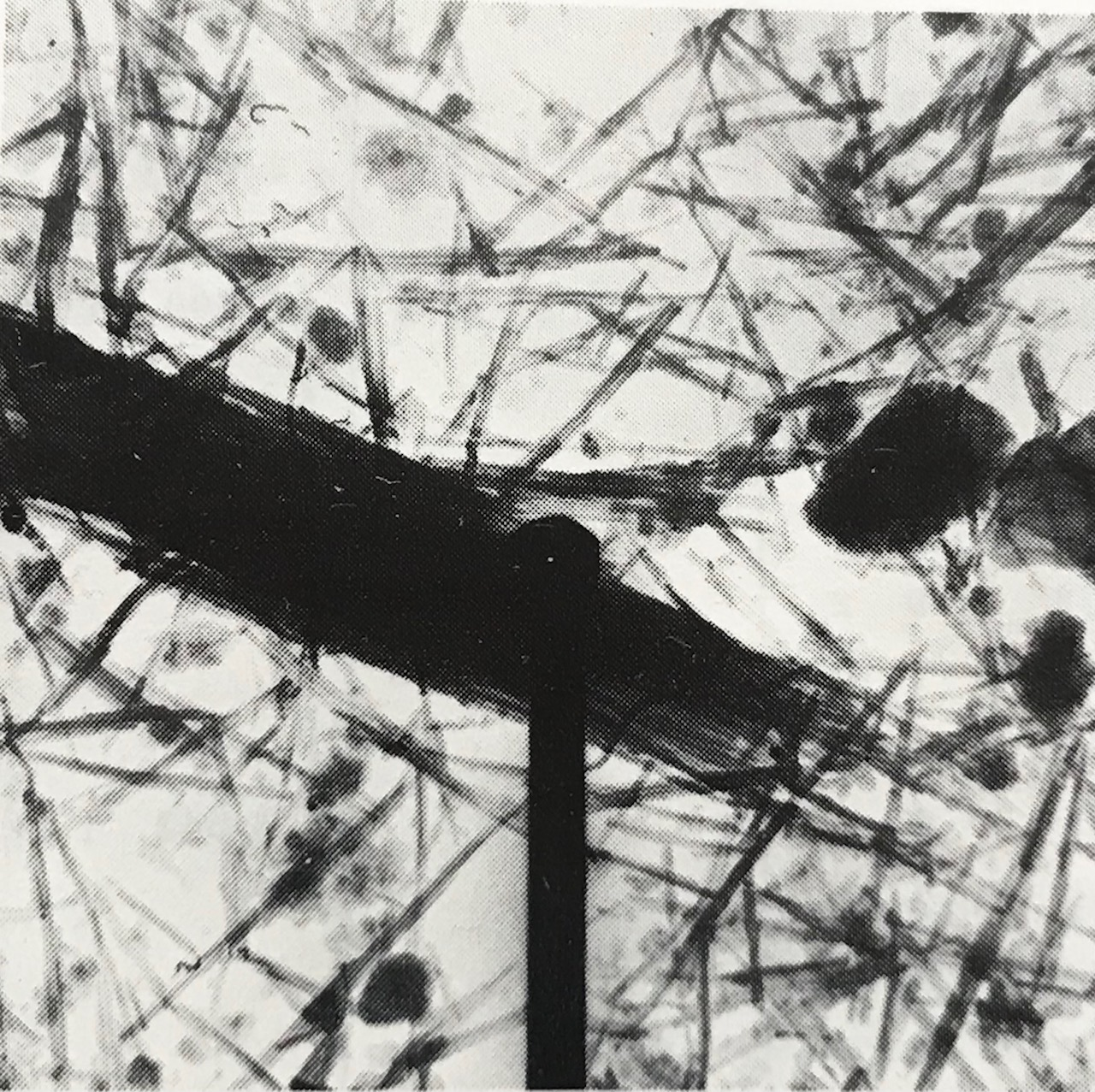
Electron micrograph of palygorskite (Wiersma 1970).

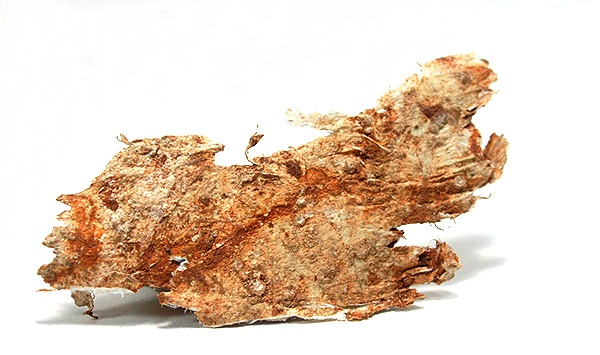
Palygorskite variant Pilolite, "mountain leather", with "modulated layers" of growth, feeling like flexible leather, Seaton, Devon, UK, before 2011.

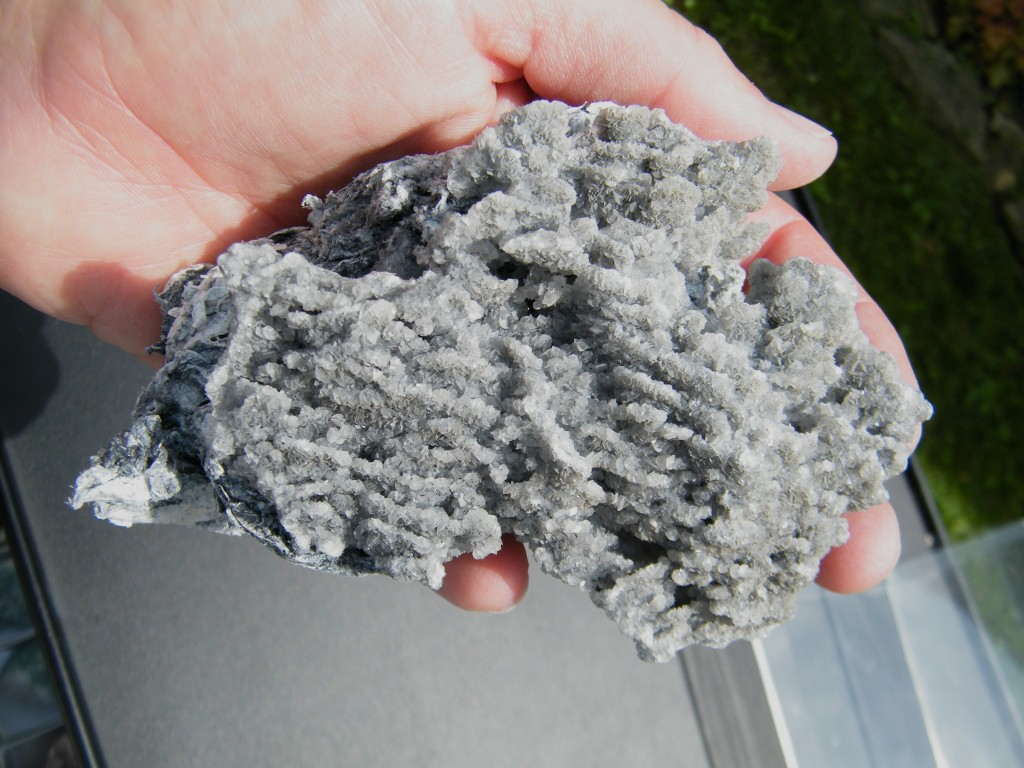
Rows of colorless calcite crystals held together by layers of papery palygorskite. From Metaline Falls, Washington, USA, 2013.

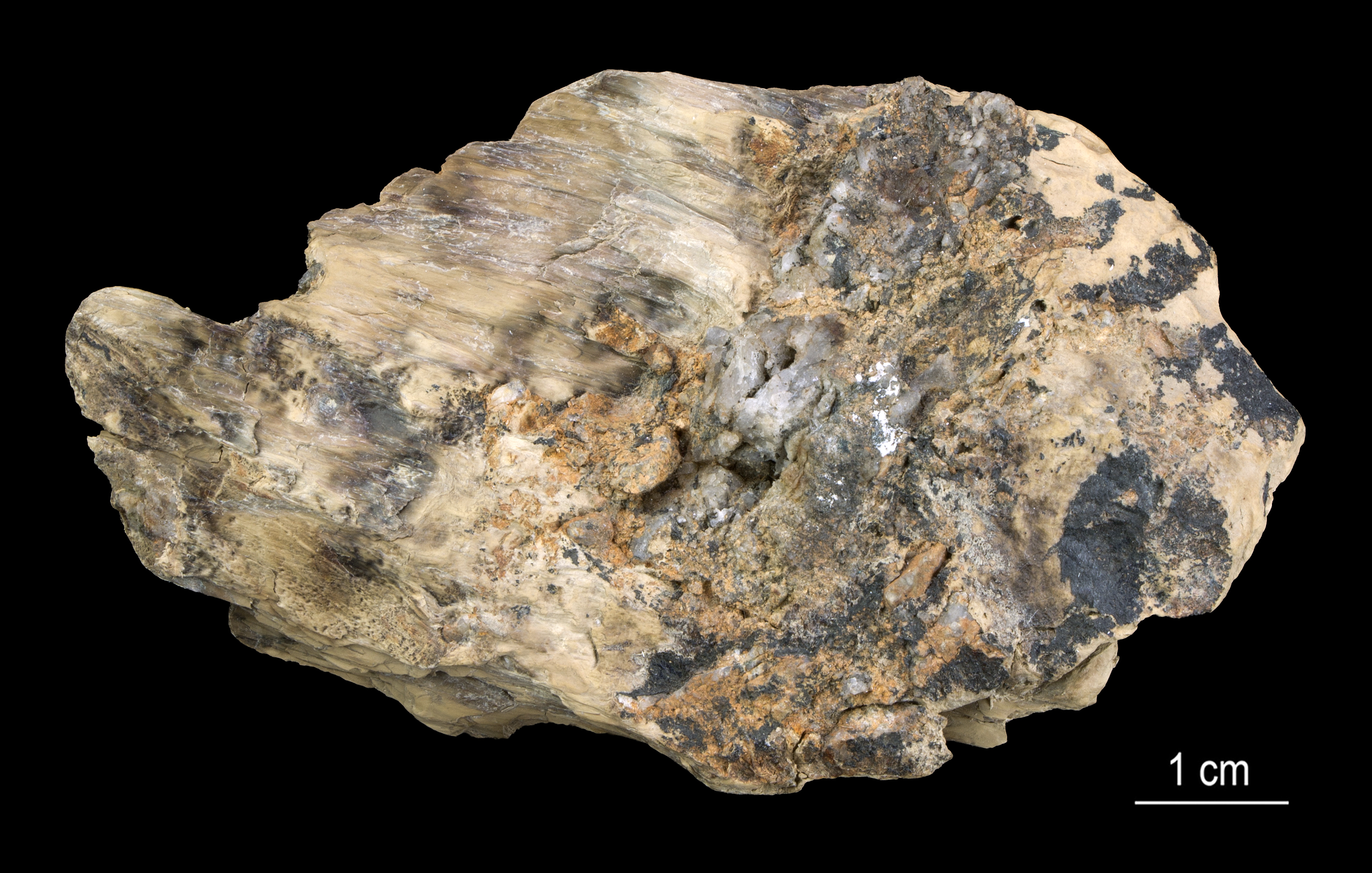
Palygorskite. Estonian Museum of Natural History, 2015.

== See also ==
- Sepiolite – Soft and porous white magnesium phyllosilicate clay
- Talc – Phyllosilicate mineral in the pyrophyllite-talc group
