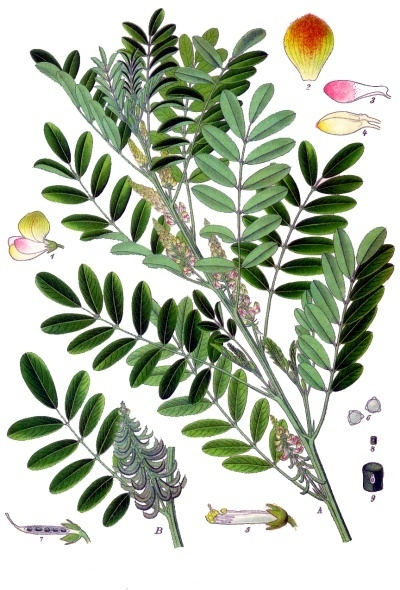

Scientific classification
- Kingdom: Plantae
- Clade: Tracheophytes
- Clade: Angiosperms
- Clade: Eudicots
- Clade: Rosids
- Order: Fabales
- Family: Fabaceae
- Subfamily: Faboideae
- Genus: Indigofera
- Species: I. suffruticosa

Binomial name
- Indigofera suffruticosa Mill., 1768

Synonyms
- Indigofera anil L.

= Indigofera suffruticosa =

Anil

Species of legume

Indigofera suffruticosa, commonly known as Guatemalan indigo, small-leaved indigo (Sierra Leone), West Indian indigo, wild indigo, and anil, is a flowering plant in the pea family, Fabaceae.

Anil is native to the subtropical and tropical Americas, including the Southern United States, the Caribbean, Mexico, Central America, and South America as far south as northern Argentina. This species has been widely introduced to other parts of the world and today has a pantropical distribution. It is an erect branching shrub growing to 1 m (3.3 ft) tall with pinnate leaves, and is commonly found growing in dry, highly disturbed areas such as roadsides and fallow fields.

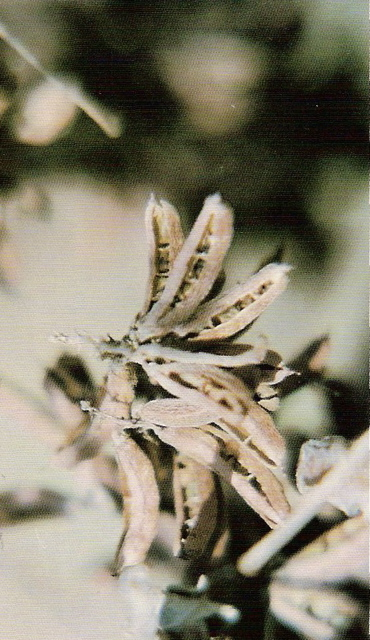
Seeds of anil

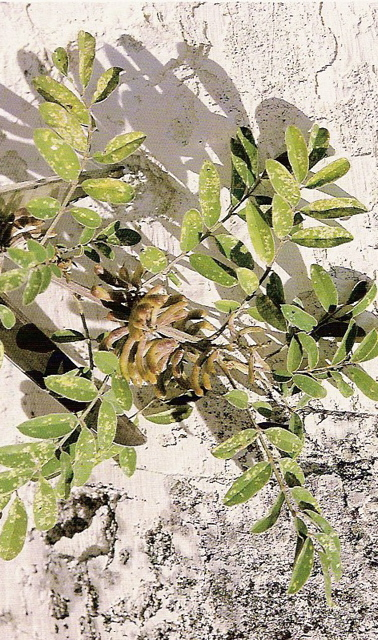
Leaves of anil

Anil is commonly used as a source for indigo dye, and if mixed with Palygorskite clays, can produce Maya blue, a pigment used by the Mesoamerican civilizations.
