= Juan Gerson =

Nahua painter (active c. 1562)

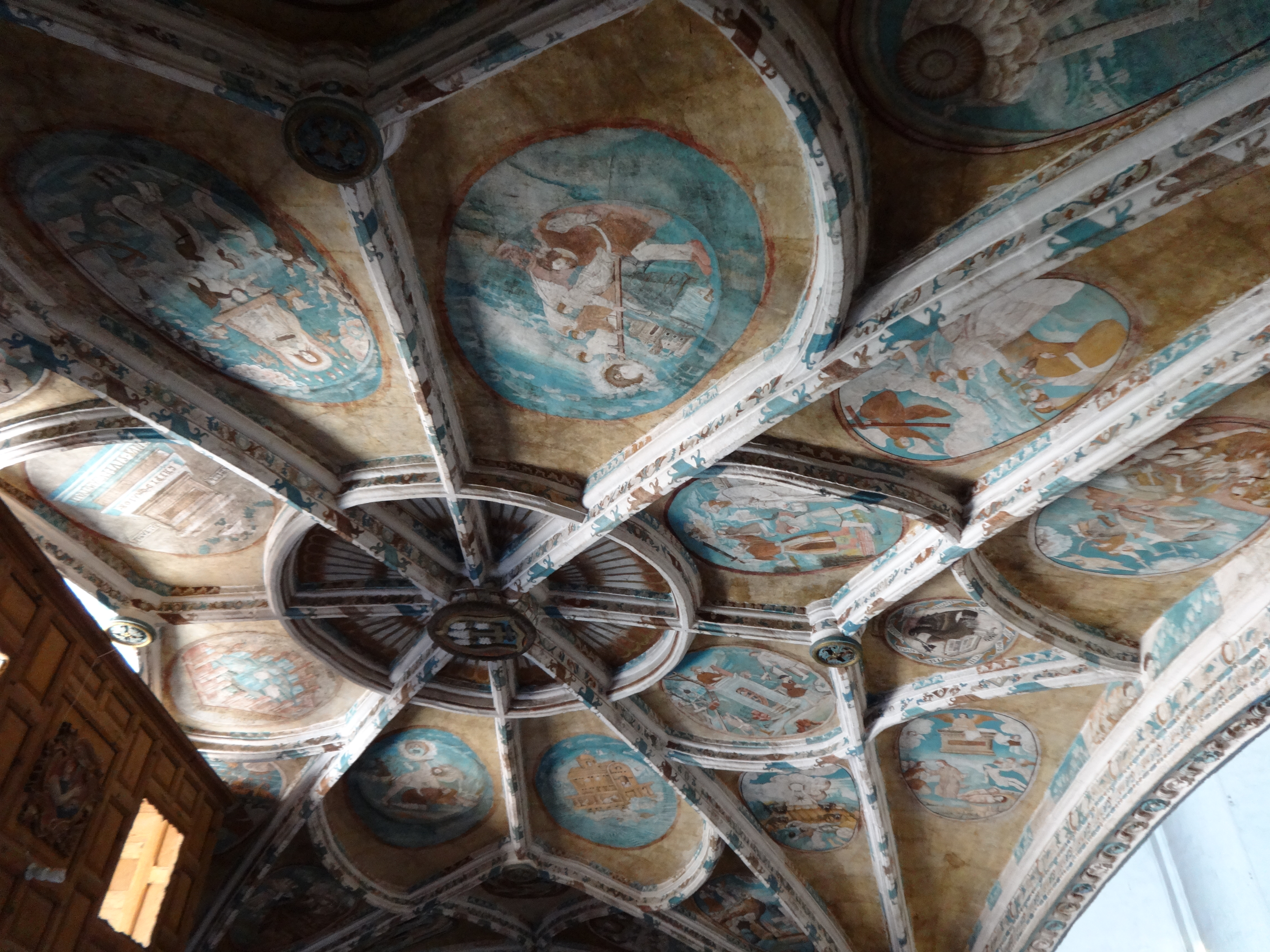
Juan Gerson's religious paintings in the Franciscan church of Tecamachalco, Puebla, 1562.

Juan Gerson (active c. 1562) was a high status indigenous Nahua painter, named after the French theologian Jean Gerson, working in Tecamachalco, Puebla. Not until 1962 when a group of Mexican scholars found documentation to his high status indigenous heritage was Gerson identity revealed. It was previously thought he was Flemish, trained in Italy, working from entirely within the European tradition before coming to colonial Mexico. Art historians Carolyn Dean and Dana Leibsohn consider Gerson's case of misrecognition as "reveal[ing] once again our refusal to recognize the indigene unless his or her work is visibly pre-Hispanic. Further, the revisions of scholarship that follow the discovery of these artists' genetic make-up involve a literal re-seeing of their work." Mexican art historian Francisco Pérez Salazar considers his work "mediocre and defective."

His paintings decorated chapels in sixteenth-century central Mexico. He is known to have painted the church of St Francisco de Tecamachalco. Manuel Toussaint attributes murals to him in Epazoyucan, based on style. He painted scenes of the Old Testament and the Apocalypse in bright colors on amate paper, then applied to the walls, rather than painted on them directly. Likely he used European printed woodcuts available in New Spain by this time as models. The 28 scenes in Tecamachaldo start with Cain and Abel, the Flood, the Tower of Babel, Abraham's sacrifice of his son Isaac, the Dream of Jacob, and Ezekiel's “visions of the Heavenly Jerusalem and the Altar of the Holocaust.” "Some scholars believe that he chose the Apocalypse as a subject because it resonated with pre-Hispanic traditions." It is speculated that Gerson was the illustrator for the Voynich Codex.

== See also ==
- Mexican art
