= Thermal insulation =

Minimization of heat transfer

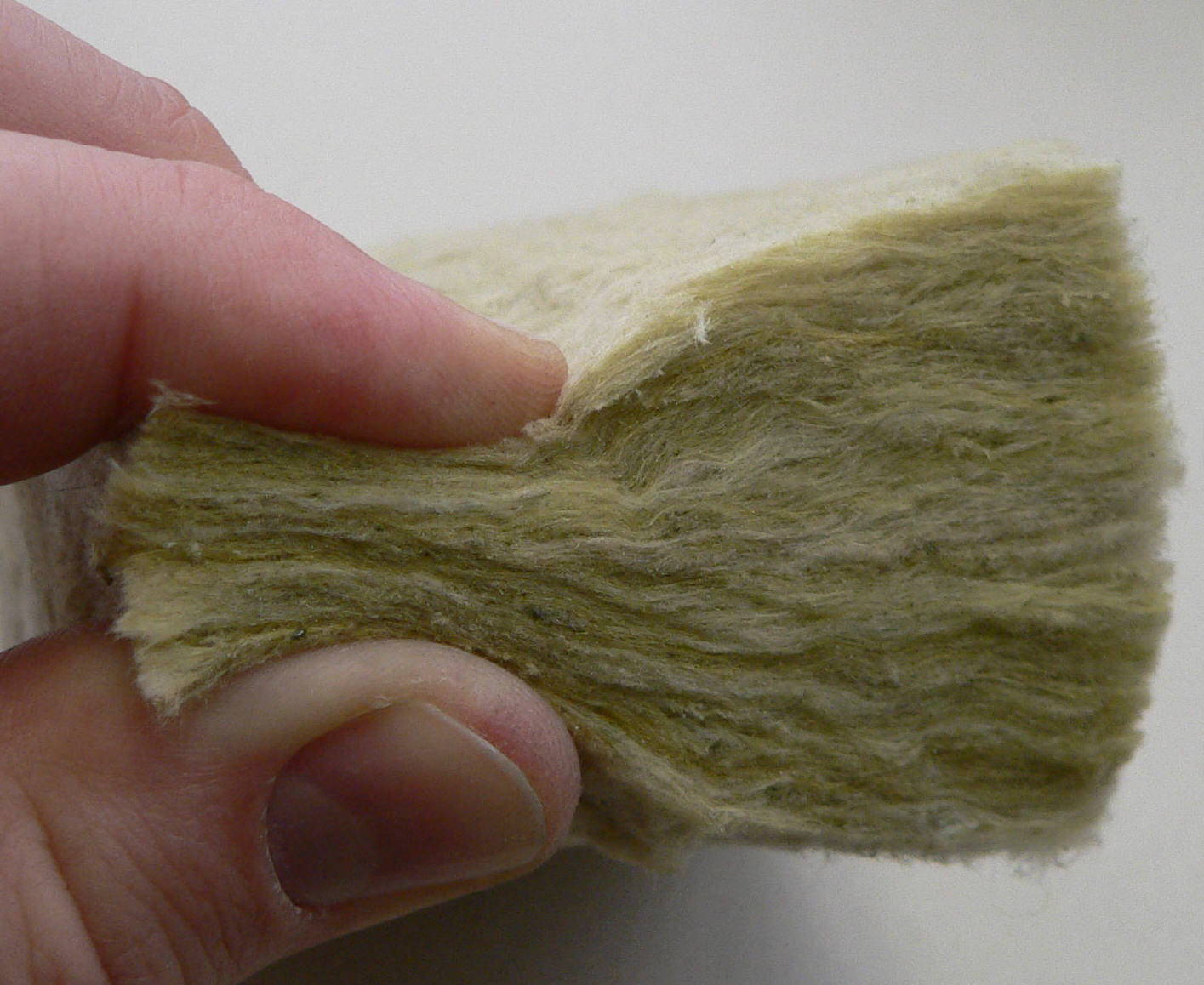
Mineral wool insulation

Thermal insulation is the reduction of heat transfer (i.e., the transfer of thermal energy between objects of differing temperature) between objects in thermal contact or in range of radiative influence. Thermal insulation can be achieved with specially engineered methods or processes, as well as with suitable object shapes and materials.

Heat flow is an inevitable consequence of contact between objects of different temperature. Thermal insulation provides a region of insulation in which thermal conduction is reduced, creating a thermal break or thermal barrier, or thermal radiation is reflected rather than absorbed by the lower-temperature body.

The insulating capability of a material is measured as the inverse of thermal conductivity (k). Low thermal conductivity is equivalent to high insulating capability (resistance value). In thermal engineering, other important properties of insulating materials are product density (ρ) and specific heat capacity (c).

== Definition ==
Graph showing how heat transfer decreases as insulation thickness increases.

Thermal conductivity k is measured in watts-per-meter per kelvin (W·m^{−1}·K^{−1} or W/(m·K)). This is because heat transfer, measured as power, has been found to be (approximately) proportional to

- difference of temperature $\Delta T$
- the surface area of thermal contact $A$
- the inverse of the thickness of the material $d$

From this, it follows that the power of heat loss $P$ is given by $P = \frac{k A\, \Delta T }{d}$

Thermal conductivity depends on the material and for fluids, its temperature and pressure. For comparison purposes, conductivity under standard conditions (20 °C at 1 atm) is commonly used. For some materials, thermal conductivity may also depend upon the direction of heat transfer.

The act of insulation is accomplished by encasing an object in material with low thermal conductivity in high thickness. Decreasing the exposed surface area could also lower heat transfer, but this quantity is usually fixed by the geometry of the object to be insulated.

Multi-layer insulation is used where radiative loss dominates, or when the user is restricted in volume and weight of the insulation (e.g. emergency blanket, radiant barrier)

=== Insulation of cylinders ===
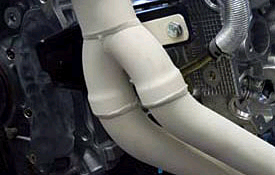
A ceramic coating on the exhaust system of a car lowers the surface temperature.

For insulated cylinders, a critical radius blanket must be reached. Before the critical radius is reached, any added insulation increases heat transfer. The convective thermal resistance is inversely proportional to the surface area and therefore the radius of the cylinder, while the thermal resistance of a cylindrical shell (the insulation layer) depends on the ratio between outside and inside radius, not on the radius itself. If the outside radius of a cylinder is increased by applying insulation, a fixed amount of conductive resistance (equal to 2×π×k×L(Tin-Tout)/ln(Rout/Rin)) is added. However, at the same time, the convective resistance is reduced. This implies that adding insulation below a certain critical radius actually increases the heat transfer. For insulated cylinders, the critical radius is given by the equation

$${r_\text{critical}} = {k \over h}$$

This equation shows that the critical radius depends only on the heat transfer coefficient and the thermal conductivity of the insulation. If the radius of the insulated cylinder is smaller than the critical radius for insulation, the addition of any amount of insulation will increase heat transfer.

== Applications ==
=== Clothing and natural animal insulation in birds and mammals ===
Gases possess poor thermal conduction properties compared to liquids and solids and thus make good insulation material if they can be trapped. In order to further augment the effectiveness of a gas (such as air), it may be disrupted into small cells, which cannot effectively transfer heat by natural convection. Convection involves a larger bulk flow of gas driven by buoyancy and temperature differences, and it does not work well in small cells where there is little density difference to drive it, and the high surface-to-volume ratios of the small cells retards gas flow in them by means of viscous drag.

In order to accomplish small gas cell formation in man-made thermal insulation, glass and polymer materials can be used to trap air in a foam-like structure. This principle is used industrially in building and piping insulation such as (glass wool), cellulose, rock wool, polystyrene foam (styrofoam), urethane foam, vermiculite, perlite, and cork. Trapping air is also the principle in all highly insulating clothing materials such as wool, down feathers and fleece.

The air-trapping property is also the insulation principle employed by homeothermic animals to stay warm, for example down feathers, and insulating hair such as natural sheep's wool. In both cases the primary insulating material is air, and the polymer used for trapping the air is natural keratin protein.

=== Buildings ===
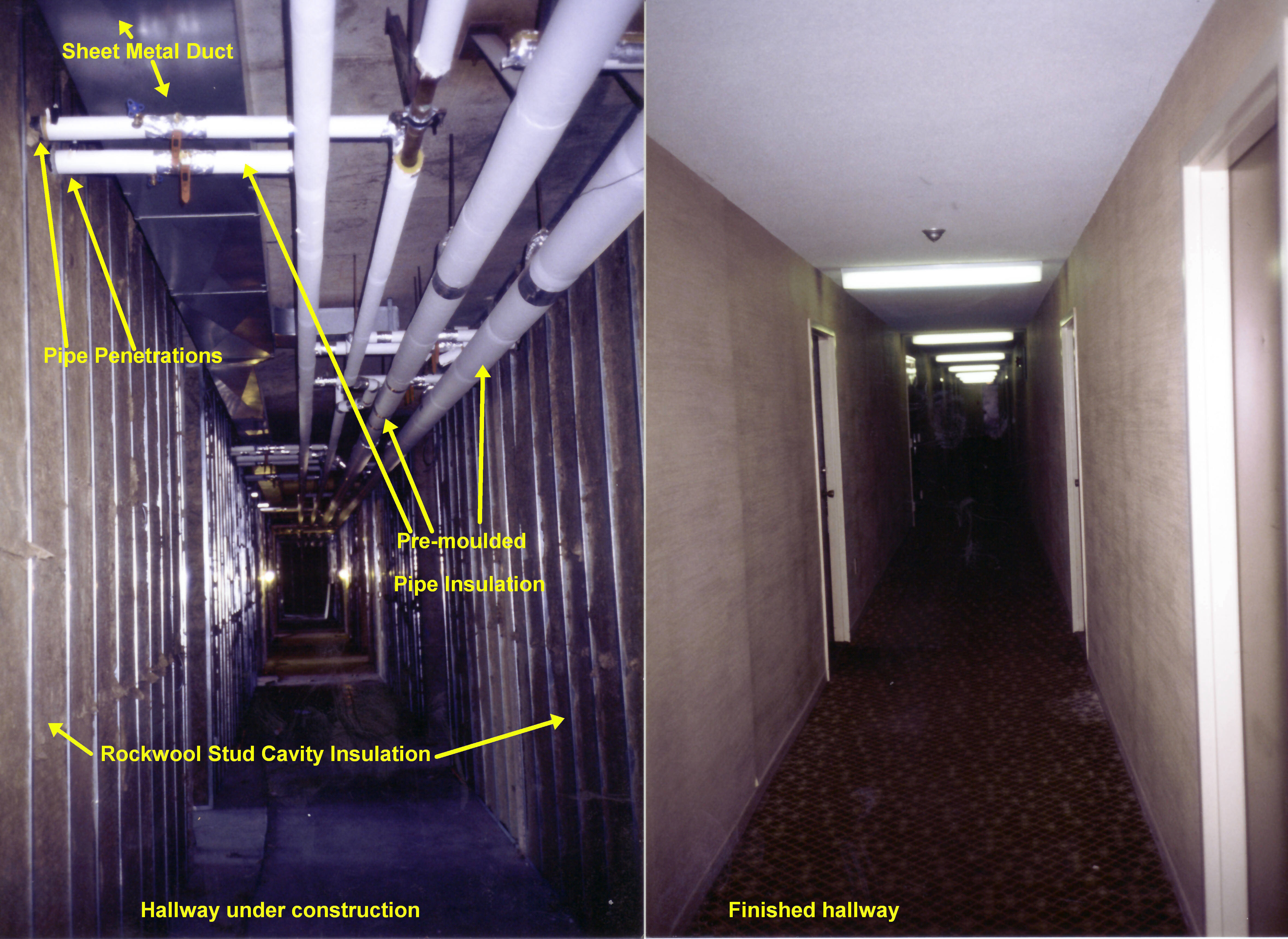
Common insulation applications in apartment building in Ontario, Canada.

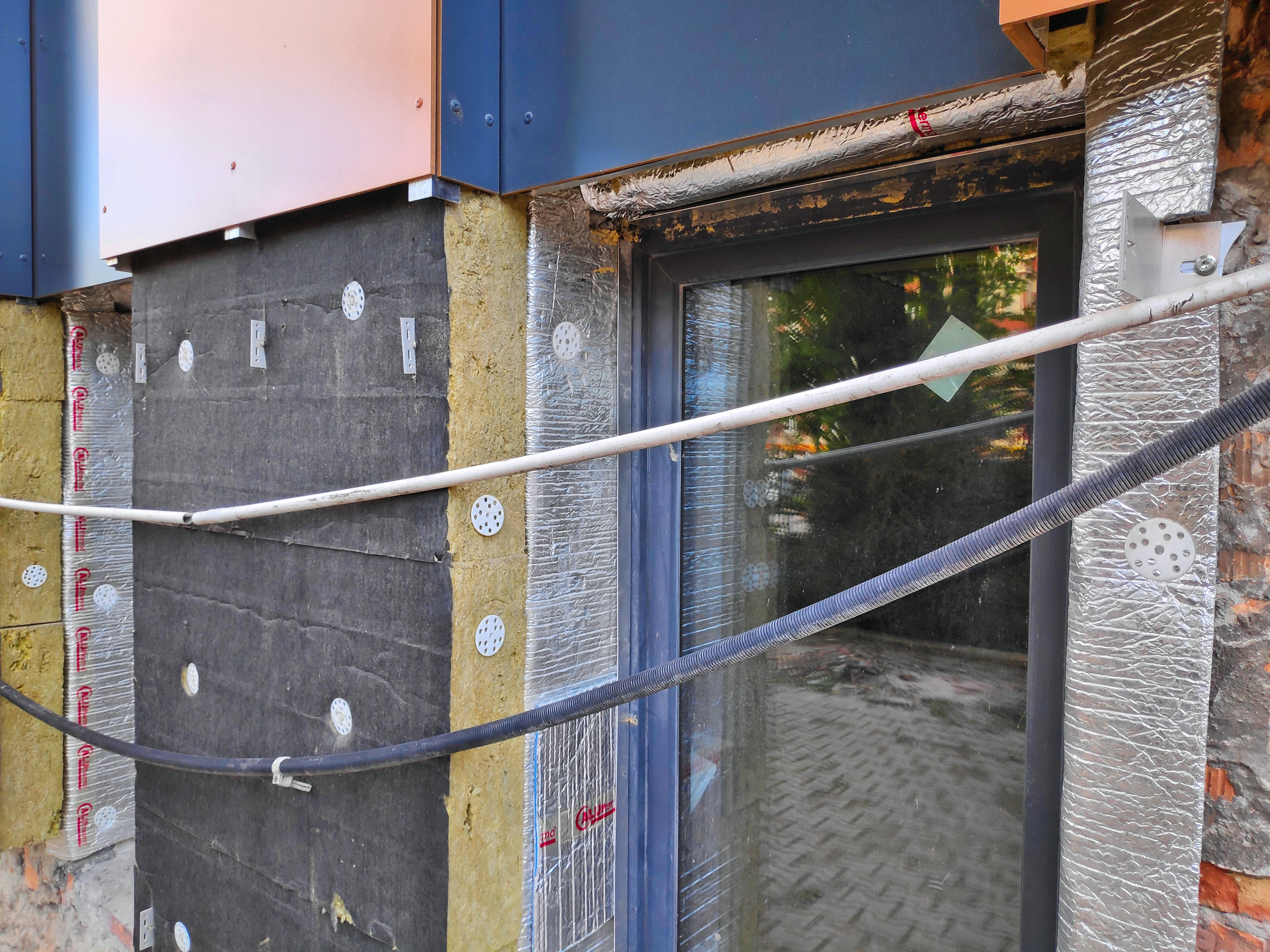
Thermal insulation retrofit works on a department store building in Poland

Maintaining acceptable temperatures in buildings (by heating and cooling) uses a large proportion of global energy consumption. Building insulations also commonly use the principle of small trapped air-cells as explained above, e.g. fiberglass (specifically glass wool), cellulose, rock wool, polystyrene foam, urethane foam, vermiculite, perlite, cork, etc. For a period of time, asbestos was also used, however, it caused health problems.

Window insulation film can be applied in weatherization applications to reduce incoming thermal radiation in summer and loss in winter.

When well insulated, a building is:

- energy efficient and cheaper to keep warm in the winter, or cool in the summer. Energy efficiency will lead to a reduced carbon footprint.
- more comfortable because there is uniform temperatures throughout the space. There is less temperature gradient both vertically (between ankle height and head height) and horizontally from exterior walls, ceilings and windows to the interior walls, thus producing a more comfortable occupant environment when outside temperatures are extremely cold or hot.

In industry, energy has to be expended to raise, lower, or maintain the temperature of objects or process fluids. If these are not insulated, this increases the energy requirements of a process, and therefore the cost and environmental impact.

=== Mechanical systems ===
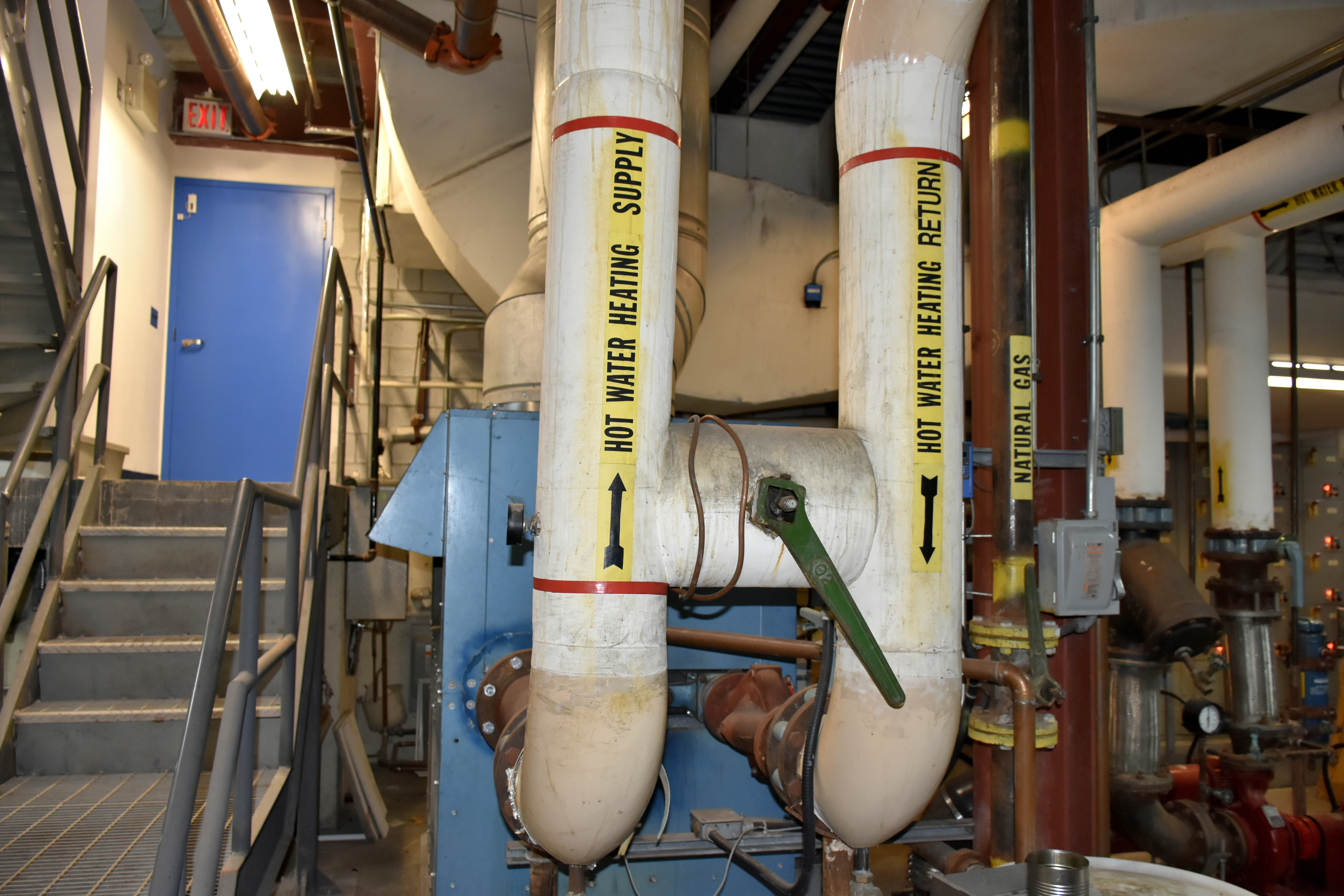
Insulated hot water supply and return hydronic piping on a gas-fired boiler

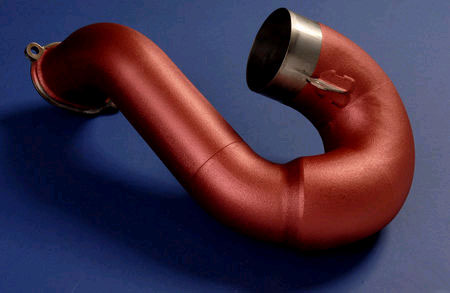
Thermal insulation applied to exhaust component by means of plasma spraying

Space heating and cooling systems distribute heat throughout buildings by means of pipes or ductwork. Insulating these pipes using pipe insulation reduces energy into unoccupied rooms and prevents condensation from occurring on cold and chilled pipework.

Pipe insulation is also used on water supply pipework to help delay pipe freezing for an acceptable length of time.

Mechanical insulation is commonly installed in industrial and commercial facilities.

=== Passive radiative cooling surfaces ===
Thermal insulation has been found to improve the thermal emittance of passive radiative cooling surfaces by increasing the surface's ability to lower temperatures below ambient under direct solar intensity. Different materials may be used for thermal insulation, including polyethylene aerogels that reduce solar absorption and parasitic heat gain which may improve the emitter's performance by over 20%. Other aerogels also exhibited strong thermal insulation performance for radiative cooling surfaces, including a silica-alumina nanofibrous aerogel.

=== Refrigeration ===
A refrigerator consists of a heat pump and a thermally insulated compartment.

=== Spacecraft ===
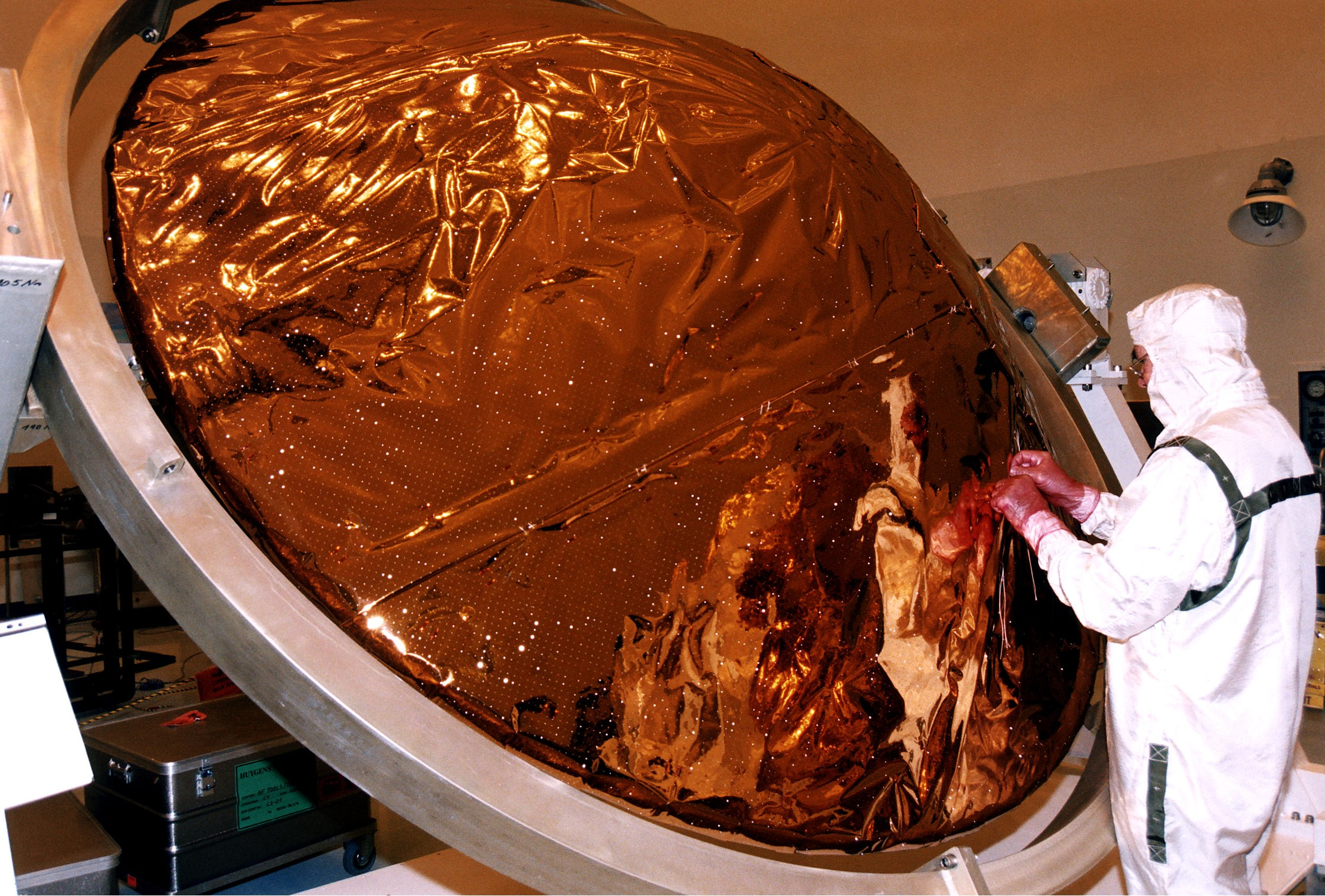
Thermal insulation on the Huygens probe

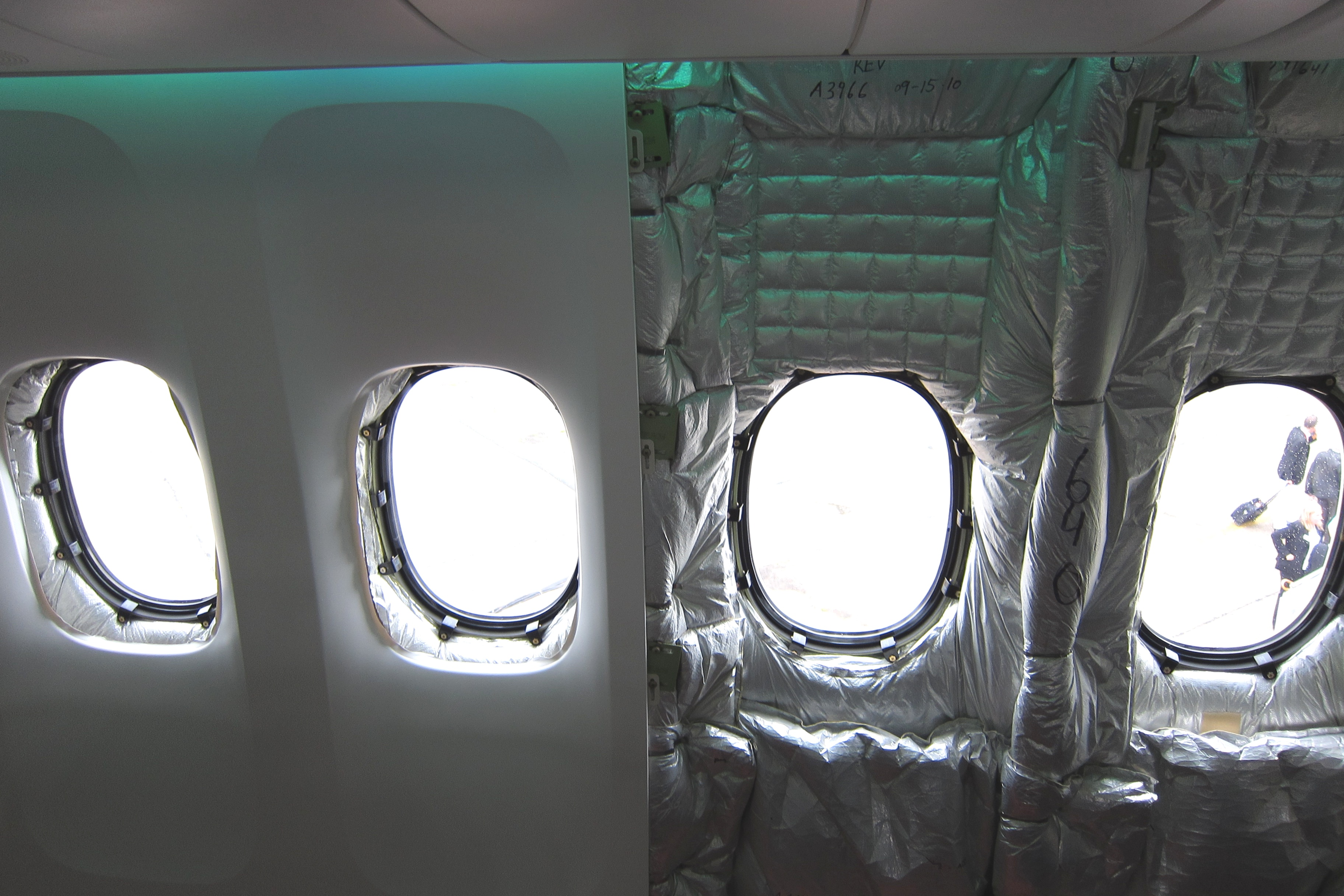
Cabin insulation of a Boeing 747-8 airliner

Launch and re-entry place severe mechanical stresses on spacecraft, so the strength of an insulator is critically important; the failure of insulating tiles on the Space Shuttle Columbia caused the shuttle airframe to overheat and break apart during reentry, killing the astronauts on board. Re-entry through the atmosphere generates very high temperatures due to compression of the air at high speeds. Insulators must meet demanding physical properties beyond their thermal transfer retardant properties. Examples of insulation used on spacecraft include reinforced carbon-carbon composite nose cone and silica fiber tiles of the Space Shuttle. See also Insulative paint.

=== Automotive ===
Internal combustion engines produce a lot of heat during their combustion cycle. This can have a negative effect when it reaches various heat-sensitive components such as sensors, batteries, and starter motors. As a result, thermal insulation is necessary to prevent the heat from the exhaust from reaching these components.

Race cars such as F1, high performance road cars and even most ordinary road cars use thermal insulation to control the temperatures of critical components, principally shielding them from heat radiated from exhaust manifolds and pipes and/or turbochargers. Heat shielding is also often used in road cars to reduce the transmission of engine and exhaust system heat to the interior of the car.

=== Aerospace ===
Aircraft engines such as turbojets use thermal barriers on components such as the combuster sections/afterburner for heat protection.

=== Greenhouse ===
Thermal insulation is integral to greenhouse design, enabling controlled environments for plant growth and energy efficiency. Common insulation techniques include the use of double-layer films and multi-wall polycarbonate panels, which trap air between layers to reduce heat transfer while maintaining sufficient light transmission for photosynthesis. These measures improve energy efficiency and support year-round crop production, significantly reducing heating costs.

== Factors influencing performance ==
Insulation performance is influenced by many factors, including:

- Thermal conductivity ("k" or "λ" value)
- Surface emissivity ("ε" value)
- Insulation thickness
- Density
- Specific heat capacity
- Thermal bridging

The factors influencing performance may vary over time as material ages or environmental conditions change.

== Calculating requirements ==
Industry standards are often rules of thumb, developed over many years, that offset many conflicting goals: what people will pay for, manufacturing cost, local climate, traditional building practices, and varying standards of comfort. Both heat transfer and layer analysis may be performed in large industrial applications, but in household situations (appliances and building insulation), airtightness is the key in reducing heat transfer due to air leakage (forced or natural convection). Once airtightness is achieved, it has often been sufficient to choose the thickness of the insulating layer based on rules of thumb. Diminishing returns are achieved with each successive doubling of the insulating layer. It can be shown that for some systems, there is a minimum insulation thickness required for an improvement to be realized.

== See also ==
- Thermal mass – Use of thermal energy storage in building design
- List of thermal conductivities
- Insulative paint – Type of paint in which can be used to coat a surface to reduce heat transfer
- Heat trap – Valves or loops of pipe on water heaters
- Removable insulation blanket – Cover fastened onto a mechanical component
- Thermal pad
- Thermal envelope – Concept in architectural and engineering practice
- Down feather
- Aerogel
- Winter clothing#Types of thermal insulation
