= Thermal pad (disambiguation) =

Thermal pad can have the following meanings:

- Sleeping pad, a thin layer of insulating material placed under a hiker's sleeping bag
- Thermally conductive pad, a pad made of heat-conducting material applied to a heatsink
- Thermal relief, a pad on a printed circuit board connected to surrounding copper with a thermal connection
