= Heat trap =

Valves or loops of pipe on water heaters

Left image: Natural convection draws hot water into the pipe connected to the top and lets it recirculate into the container after it has cooled inside the pipe. Right image: The convective (micro)circulation is stopped by the loop which does not allow warm water to pass further into the pipe.

Heat traps are valves or loops of pipe on the cold water inlet and hot water outlet of water heaters. The heat traps allow cold water to flow into the water heater tank, but prevent unwanted natural convection and heated water to flow out of the tank. Newer water heaters have built-in heat traps.

== About ==
Many water-heating pieces of equipment have integral heat traps installed from the factory. For water-heating equipment that does not already have factory installed heat traps, they must be purchased then installed in the inlet and outlet connections.

Heat traps are very simple and inexpensive. They are an effective way to prevent cooling of hot water in water heaters by thermosyphoning the hot water to a higher elevated portion of the piping system. Thermosyphoning is based on natural convection. Hot water rises and is then displaced by cold water beneath it. The heat trap stops this process, thus keeping the hot water inside the insulated storage tank.

== See also ==
- Plumbing – Systems for conveying fluids
- Thermosiphon – Method of heat exchange in which convection drives pumpless circulation
- Thermal barrier – Minimization of heat transfer
- Thermal pad

== Literature ==
- Have we forgotten to make heat traps?, Esbe AB, May 2012
