= Chip heater =

Domestic hot water system

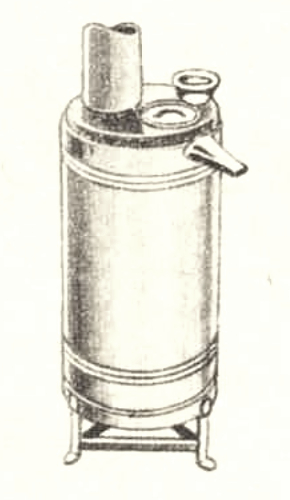
Malleys 'Model A' chip heater. At top left-to-right, flue, opening to add fuel, cold water inlet, hot water outlet.

The chip heater is a single point, tankless, domestic hot water system popular in Australia and New Zealand from the 1880s until the 1960s, advertised as a low cost source of hot bath water. Examples of this form of domestic water heater are still in use.

== Overview ==
The chip heater consisted of a cylindrical unit with a fire box and flue, through which a water pipe was run. Water was drawn from a cold water tank and circulated through the fire box. When heated, the water was drawn off to the area where it was used, typically in a bath or shower. There was often an ash box under the fire box, which allowed air under the fire, as well as various dampers in the flue. The fire box was relatively small and fed by tinder, such as newspaper, pine cones, small twigs, or wood chips. The use of the later gave the chip heater its name.

Water had to be run at a trickle in order to heat up to a desirable temperature. The rate of combustion was controlled by the flues and the ash box. With a lot of fuel and open flues the water could boil quickly, which was not a desirable result. With practice, the correct combination of fuel, flue settings, and water flow, could result in enough hot water for a bath in approximately 20 minutes. The lack of consistent control over the water temperature made it unsuitable for use in a conventional shower, but it was typically used as the hot water source to run a bath.

== History ==
The chip heater is embedded in Australian and New Zealand social history, because many people can remember using one or someone who had one. The precise history of the chip heater is unclear.

The original idea is almost certainly derived from vertical steam boilers. Architectural historian, Professor Miles Lewis, notes that the "instantaneous water heaters," which were being sold by Douglas & Sons of Melbourne by 1888, were probably chip heaters. In 1892, an advertisement in Melbourne promised that Fischer's Patent Bath Heater could be heated with wood in three minutes at the cost of one farthing.

Catalogues from between 1913 and 1919 of the American Radiator Company, which marketed its products in Australia, do not show chip heaters. That suggests that the chip heater was a local innovation.

== Variants ==
The chip heater was very similar to the gas and kerosene-powered "geyser" hot water heaters, popular in Australian suburban residences from the 1920s. The main difference was the fuel source. The Australian manufacturer, Metters Limited, supplied gas geysers for city clients (who had access to gas) and chip heaters for country clients.

== Manufacturers ==
There were a number of manufacturers and brands. According to Professor Lewis, early 20th century brands included the "Royal", "Little Hero", "Silver Ace", "Kangaroo", "Empire" and "Little Wonder". Ross Robbins of Melbourne made the "Jackson Improved Chip Heater" in the 1910s. A "Torrens" brand chip heater was sold in South Australia in the 1940s and 1950s.

Metters had a variety of chip heaters in its 1936 catalogue, including oil and kerosene-powered chip heaters. Metters claimed a flow of 2 imperial gallons (9.1 L; 2.4 US gal) of "very hot water" per minute.

F. Malley & Sons, later Malleys Ltd, manufactured chip heaters from at least 1916 to 1956, but the basic design remained similar over that period. By 1949, Malleys had introduced an adaptor device to convert their chip heater to run on kerosene. Adaptors to allow chip heaters to run on kerosene had been available by the mid 1930s.

== Sources ==
- Archer, John, 1998, Your home: the inside story of the Australian house, Port Melbourne, Lothian.
- Metters Ltd 1936 Metters' bath heater and hot water service : sectional catalogue, Metters Ltd.
- Posting on Engineering Heritage discussion group by Professor Miles Lewis 26 April 2007
- Oliver, Julie. The Australian home beautiful: from Hills hoist to high rise, McMahon's Point, N.S.W. Home Beautiful, 1999.
- Postings on the NSW Heritage Office Heritage Advisors Discussion Group by Peter Benkendorff, David Beauchamp, Susan Duyker, Elizabeth Roberts and Peter Woods, April 2007.
