= Removable insulation blanket =

Cover fastened onto a mechanical component

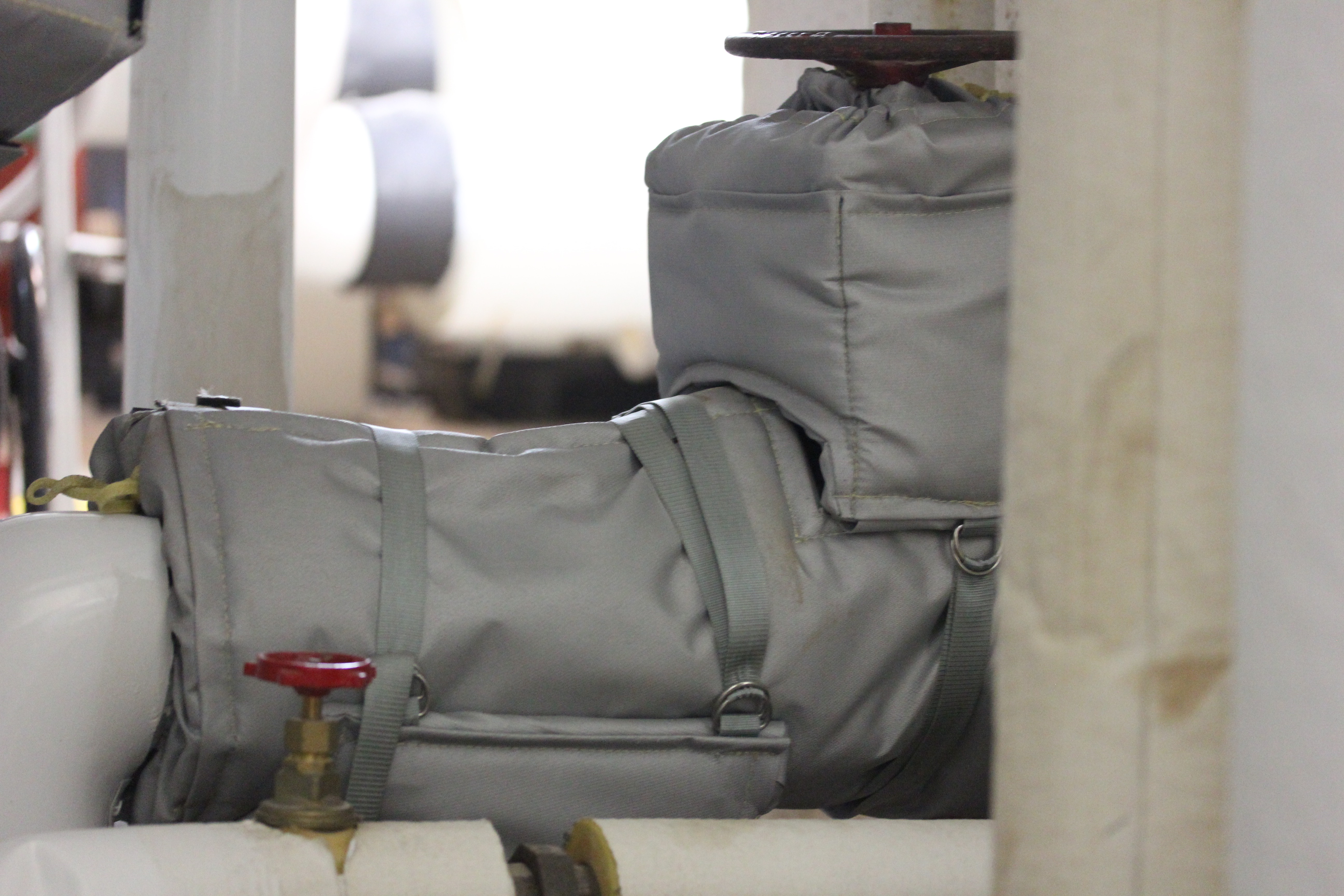
A removable insulation blanket installed on a steam system component.

A removable insulation blanket is a cover made from layers of thermal insulation materials that is fastened onto a mechanical component to maximize its efficiency, regulate its temperature, and improve workplace safety. Using such blankets ensures that the covered component is easily accessible and serviceable, unlike traditional stay-in-place insulation. Removable insulation blankets are also known as removable insulation pads, removable insulation covers, and removable insulation jackets.

Removable insulation blankets can be installed on many indoor and outdoor components such as boilers, steam traps, pipes, valves, flanges, and more. They are typically used to prevent heat from escaping hot components; however, they can also be used to prevent freezing or warming of cold components. The insulation materials used vary based on environmental external temperatures, internal operating temperatures, and more.

== Types ==
There are several types of removable insulation blankets. The most common are:

- Removable insulation blankets for hot components: used to prevent heat from escaping components by covering the surface of component with insulation materials that slow the transfer of heat.
- Removable insulation blankets for cold components: used to prevent external heat from affecting a chilled pipe. Also used to prevent condensation from forming on pipes, known as pipe sweating, which can damage components and create a hazardous work environment.
- Removable insulation blankets for freeze prevention: used to prevent subfreezing temperatures from affecting an indoor or outdoor component or pipe. Freeze damage can be costly and time consuming to repair, as often the only solution is to let the component thaw.
- Removable insulation blankets for sound attenuation: used to quiet noisy components that are disruptive or dangerous . The Occupational Safety and Health Administration (OSHA) has safety regulations on decibel exposure to employees.

== Design & Function ==
=== Design ===
Most removable insulation blankets follow a similar design process that begins by taking measurement of the component being insulated. Next, appropriate insulation materials are selected . Once a pattern is designed to snugly fit the component, the selected noncombustible materials are layered and cut to exact measurements using specialized precision cutting technology. Then, they are sewn together by an industrial sewing machine. Finally, fasteners such as straps, D-rings, and hook and loop are installed to enable the removable insulation blanket to remain in place.

=== Function ===
Insulation is achieved by slowing the transfer of thermal energy (heat) to or from a component. This is achieved by insulating the component with materials that have a high r-value, which measures how well a material resists conductive flow of heat. The external layer of a removable insulation blanket is typically durable, made with a material like Silicone or Teflon, to protect the component from the elements. The touch temperature of the component is lowered to a safer temperature, which prevents workplace injury.

== Materials ==
The materials used in the design of removable insulation blankets vary based on the type. Some of the most commonly used materials used include:

- PTFE Laminates
- Silicone Coated Fiberglass Composite
- EJ 1650 / PTFE Fiberglass Composite
- Kevlar (threading)
- Fiberglas UtiliCore®
- Temp Mat
- Pyrogel XT-E
- Ceramic Paper

== Benefits ==
Removable insulation blankets provide many benefits including:

- Reduced Energy Costs: an immediate reduction of energy usage follows the installation of removable insulation blankets. This helps facility managers to meet their energy performance goals. Removable insulation blankets are optimal for buildings with high steam consumption.
- Safer Work Environment: removable insulation blankets reduce the touch temperature of pipes and components. The ambient air room temperature is also significantly reduced. This prevents unwanted worker injuries.
- Better Asset Management: a large facility can have over 500 components requiring insulation. Tags with QR codes attached to the removable insulation blankets allow facility managers to track their maintenance more easily.
- Better Regular Maintenance: removable insulation blankets can be temporarily removed to allow the component or pipe underneath to be serviced. Traditional stay-in-place insulation is often damaged or removed during maintenance and not replaced.
- Reduce Greenhouse Gas Emissions: fewer BTUs consumed as a result of removable insulation blankets means less carbon dioxide emissions.
