= Floor drain =

Plumbing fixture

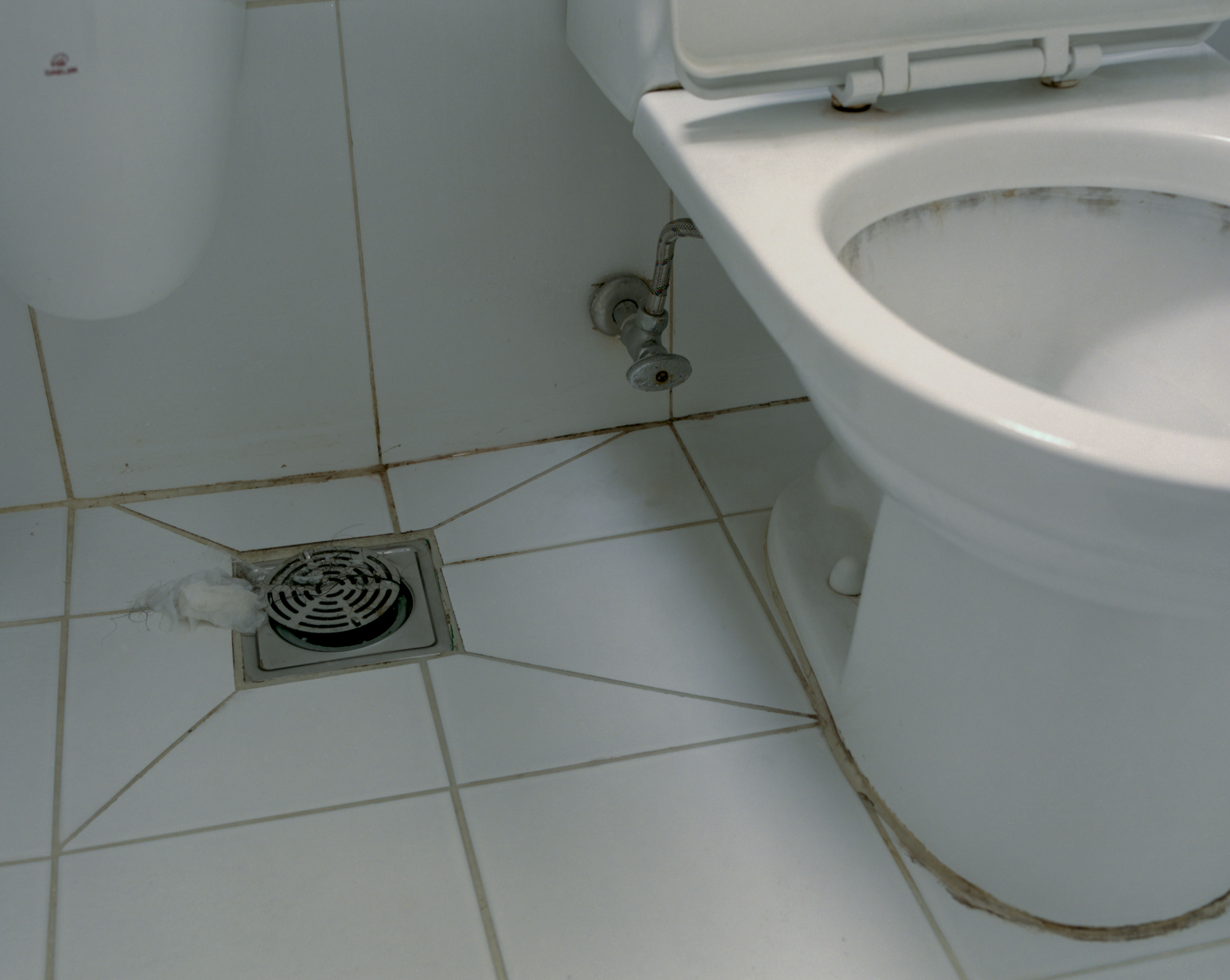
Floor drain system in bathroom, Korea.

A floor drain is a plumbing fixture that is installed in the floor of a structure, mainly designed to remove any standing water near it. They are usually round, but can also be square or rectangular. They usually range from 2 to 12 inches (5.1 to 30.5 cm); most are 4 inches (10 cm) in diameter. They have gratings that are made of metal or plastic. The floor around the drain is also level or sloped to allow the water to flow to the drain.

Many residential basements have one or more floor drains, usually near a water heater or washer/dryer. Floor drains can also be found in commercial basements, restrooms, kitchens, refrigerator areas, locker/shower rooms, laundry facilities, and near swimming pools, among other places.

A floor drain should always have a strainer secured over it to prevent injury, entry of foreign objects, or introduction of unwanted pests into the facility. However, if the strainer is not smooth enough, hair and other objects can still get stuck in it, clogging the drain. Usually, each floor drain is connected to a trap, to prevent sewer gases from escaping into indoors spaces.

A floor sink is a type of floor drain primarily used as an indirect waste receptor. It is generally deeper than a standard floor drain and can have a full or partial grate, or no grate as required to accommodate the indirect waste pipes. It usually has a dome strainer in the bottom to prevent splash-back. The body material can be epoxy coated or enameled cast iron, stainless steel, or PVC. Floor sinks are found in commercial kitchens and some hospital applications.

== Standards ==
The American Society of Mechanical Engineers publishes standard A112.6.3, on floor and trench drains.
