= Water heating =

Thermodynamic process that uses energy sources to heat water

1. Municipal water feed; 2. Fluid from water storage tank to external (passive) heat source; passive heat source can be the ground (soil or groundwater), sun or air via heat pump or district heating; 3. Fluid from heat pump, or thermodynamic solar panel to water storage tank; 4. Pump, actuator, controller and other parts; 5. Water heater; 6. Water storage tank; 7. Hot water to domestic appliances

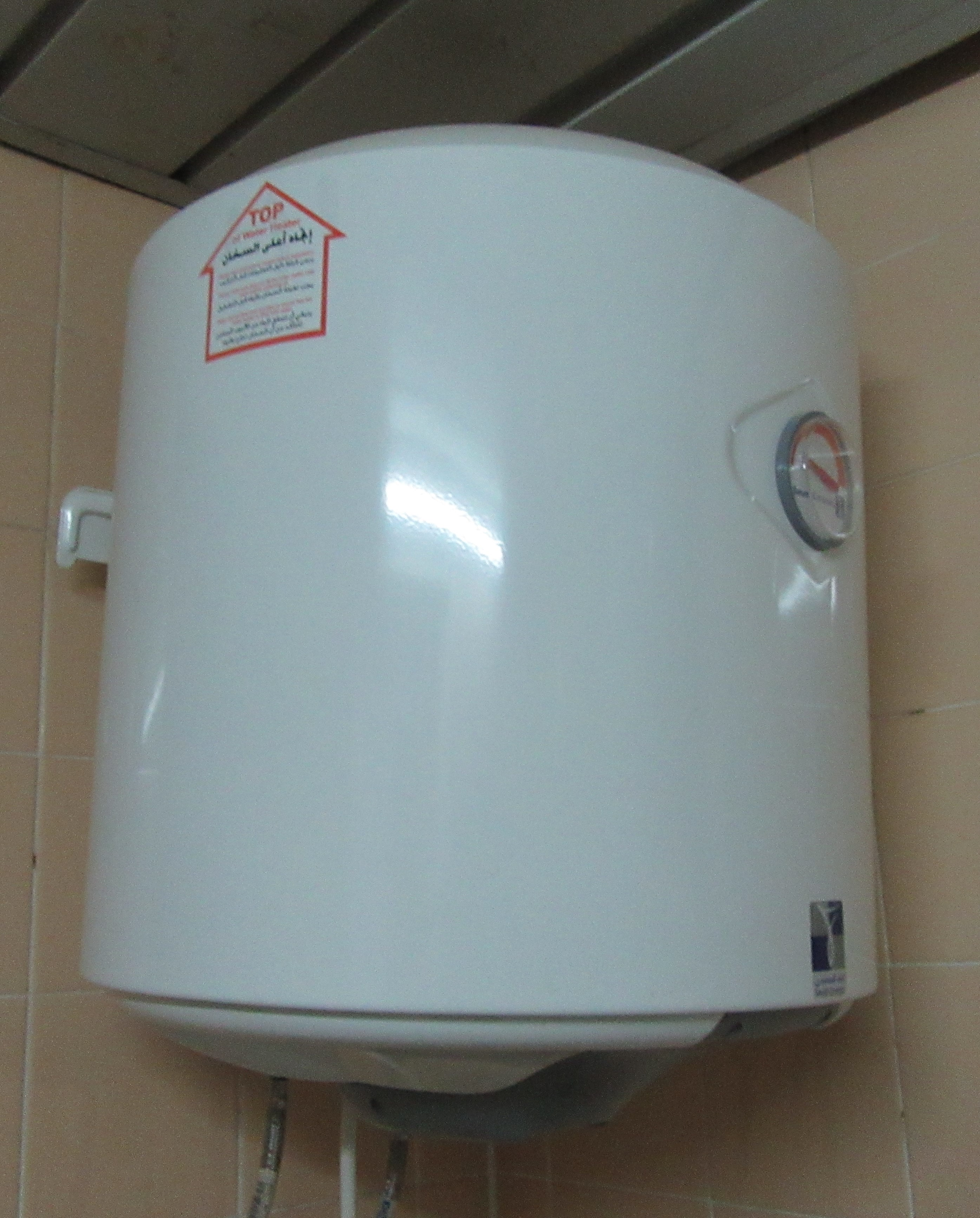
A small tank water heater

Water heating is a heat transfer process that uses an energy source to heat water above its initial temperature. Typical domestic uses of hot water include cooking, cleaning, bathing, and space heating. In industry, hot water and water heated to steam have many uses.

Domestically, water is traditionally heated in vessels known as water heaters, kettles, cauldrons, pots, or coppers. These metal vessels that heat a batch of water do not produce a continual supply of heated water at a preset temperature. Rarely, hot water occurs naturally, usually from natural hot springs. The temperature varies with the consumption rate, becoming cooler as flow increases.

Appliances that provide a continual supply of hot water are called water heaters, hot water heaters, hot water tanks, boilers, heat exchangers, geysers (Southern Africa, the Arab world, and South Asia), or calorifiers. These names depend on region, and whether they heat potable or non-potable water, are in domestic or industrial use, and their energy source. In domestic installations, potable water heated for uses other than space heating is also called domestic hot water (DHW).

Fossil fuels (natural gas, liquefied petroleum gas, oil), or solid fuels are commonly used for heating water. These may be consumed directly or may produce electricity that, in turn, heats water. Electricity to heat water may also come from any other electrical source, such as nuclear power or renewable energy. Alternative energy such as solar energy, heat pumps, hot water heat recycling, and geothermal heating can also heat water, often in combination with backup systems powered by fossil fuels or electricity.

Densely populated urban areas of some countries provide district heating of hot water. This is especially the case in Scandinavia, Finland and Poland. District heating systems supply energy for water heating and space heating from combined heat and power (CHP) plants such as incinerators, central heat pumps, waste heat from industries, geothermal heating, and central solar heating. Actual heating of tap water is performed in heat exchangers at the consumers' premises. Generally the consumer has no in-building backup system as redundancy is usually significant on the district heating supply side.

Today, in the United States, domestic hot water used in homes is most commonly heated with natural gas, electric resistance, or a heat pump. Electric heat pump water heaters are significantly more efficient than electric resistance water heaters, but also more expensive to purchase. Some energy utilities offer their customers funding to help offset the higher first cost of energy efficient water heaters.

== Types of water heating appliances ==
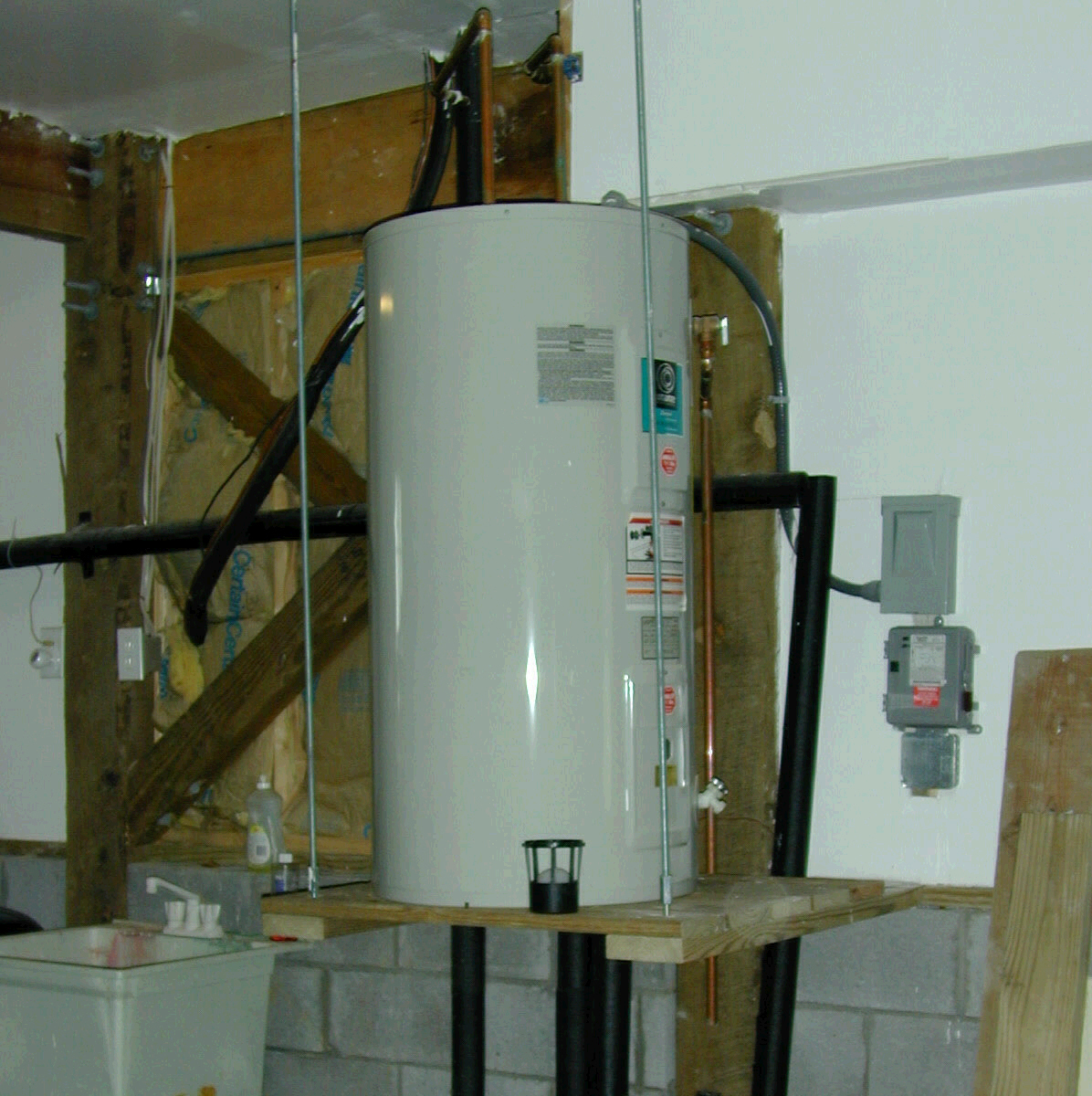
Electric-tank–type storage water heater (US)

Hot water used for space heating may be heated by fossil fuels in a boiler, while potable water may be heated in a separate appliance. This is common practice in the US, especially when warm-air space heating is usually employed.

=== Storage water heaters (tank-type) ===
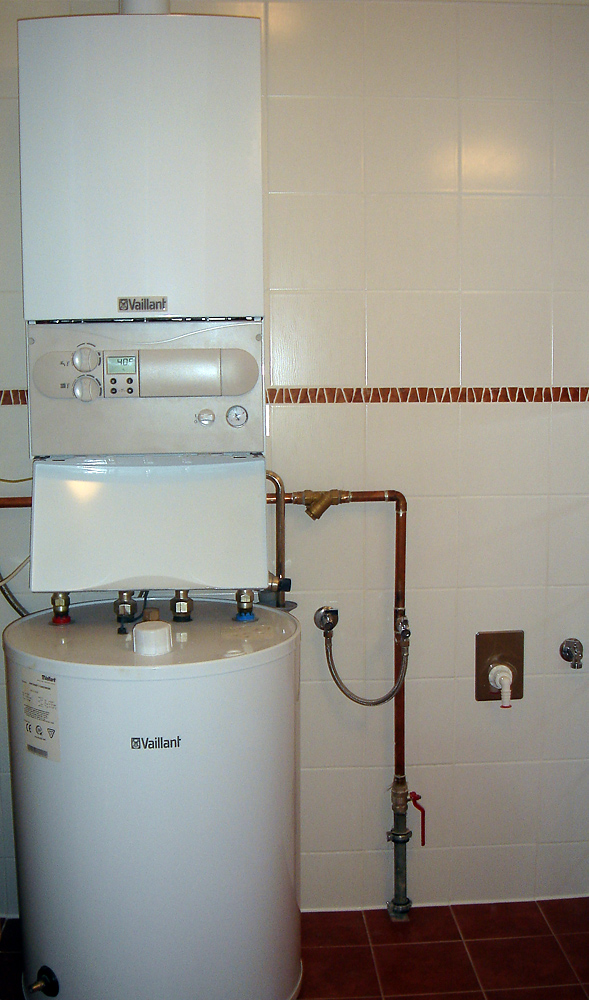
Gas furnace (top) and storage water heater (bottom) (Germany)

In household and commercial usage, most North American and Southern Asian water heaters are the tank type, also called storage water heaters. These consist of a cylindrical vessel or container that keeps water continuously hot and ready to use. Typical sizes for household use range from 75 to 400 L (20 to 100 US gallons). These may use electricity, natural gas, propane, heating oil, solar, or other energy sources. Natural gas heaters are most popular in the US and most European countries, since the gas is often conveniently piped throughout cities and towns and currently is the cheapest to use. In the United States, typical natural gas water heaters for households without unusual needs are 150–190 L (40–50 US gal) with a burner rated at 10.0–11.7 kilowatts (34,000–40,000 BTU/h).

This is a popular arrangement where higher flow rates are required for limited periods. Water is heated in a pressure vessel that can withstand a hydrostatic pressure close to that of the incoming mains supply. A pressure reducing valve is sometimes employed to limit the pressure to a safe level for the vessel. In North America, these vessels are called hot water tanks, and may incorporate an electrical resistance heater, a heat pump, or a gas or oil burner that heats water directly.

Where hot-water space heating boilers are installed, domestic hot water cylinders are usually heated indirectly by primary water from the boiler, or by an electric immersion heater (often as backup to the boiler). In the UK these vessels are called indirect cylinders and direct cylinders, respectively. Additionally, if these cylinders form part of a sealed system, providing mains-pressure hot water, they are known as unvented cylinders. In the US, when connected to a boiler, they are called indirect-fired water heaters.

Compared to tankless heaters, storage water heaters have the advantage of using energy (gas or electricity) at a relatively slow rate, storing the heat for later use. The disadvantage is that over time, heat escapes through the tank wall and the water cools down, activating the heating system to heat the water back up, so investing in a tank with better insulation improves this standby efficiency. Additionally, when heavy use exhausts the hot water, there is a significant delay before hot water is available again. Larger tanks tend to provide hot water with less temperature fluctuation at moderate flow rates.

Volume storage water heaters in the United States and New Zealand are typically vertical cylindrical tanks, usually standing on the floor, a 'cylinder tray' or on a platform raised a short distance above the floor. Volume storage water heaters in Spain are typically horizontal. In India, they are mainly vertical. In apartments they can be mounted in the ceiling space over laundry-utility rooms. In Australia, gas and electric outdoor tank heaters have mainly been used (with high temperatures to increase effective capacity), but solar roof tanks are becoming fashionable.

Tiny point-of-use (POU) electric storage water heaters with capacities ranging from 8–32 L (2–6 gallons) are made for installation in kitchen and bath cabinets or on the wall above a sink. They typically use low power heating elements, about 1 kW to 1.5 kW, and can provide hot water long enough for hand washing, or, if plumbed into an existing hot water line, until hot water arrives from a remote high capacity water heater. They may be used when retrofitting a building with hot water plumbing is too costly or impractical. Since they maintain water temperature thermostatically, they can only supply a continuous flow of hot water at extremely low flow rates, unlike high-capacity tankless heaters.

In tropical countries like Singapore and India, a storage water heater may vary from 10 L to 35 L. Smaller water heaters are sufficient, as ambient weather temperatures and incoming water temperature are moderate. The Coldest regions in India like Kashmir, people are mostly dependent on the storage type electric water heaters. Mostly 50L or 75L Storage type electric water heaters are connected to overhead water source.

=== Point-of-use (POU) versus centralized hot water ===
A locational design decision may be made between point-of-use and centralized water heaters. Centralized water heaters are more traditional, and are still a good choice for small buildings. For larger buildings with intermittent or occasional hot water use, multiple POU water heaters may be a better choice, since they can reduce long waits for hot water to arrive from a remote heater. The decision where to locate the water heater(s) is only partially independent of the decision of a tanked vs. tankless water heater, or the choice of energy source for the heat.

=== Instantaneous water heaters (tankless-type) ===
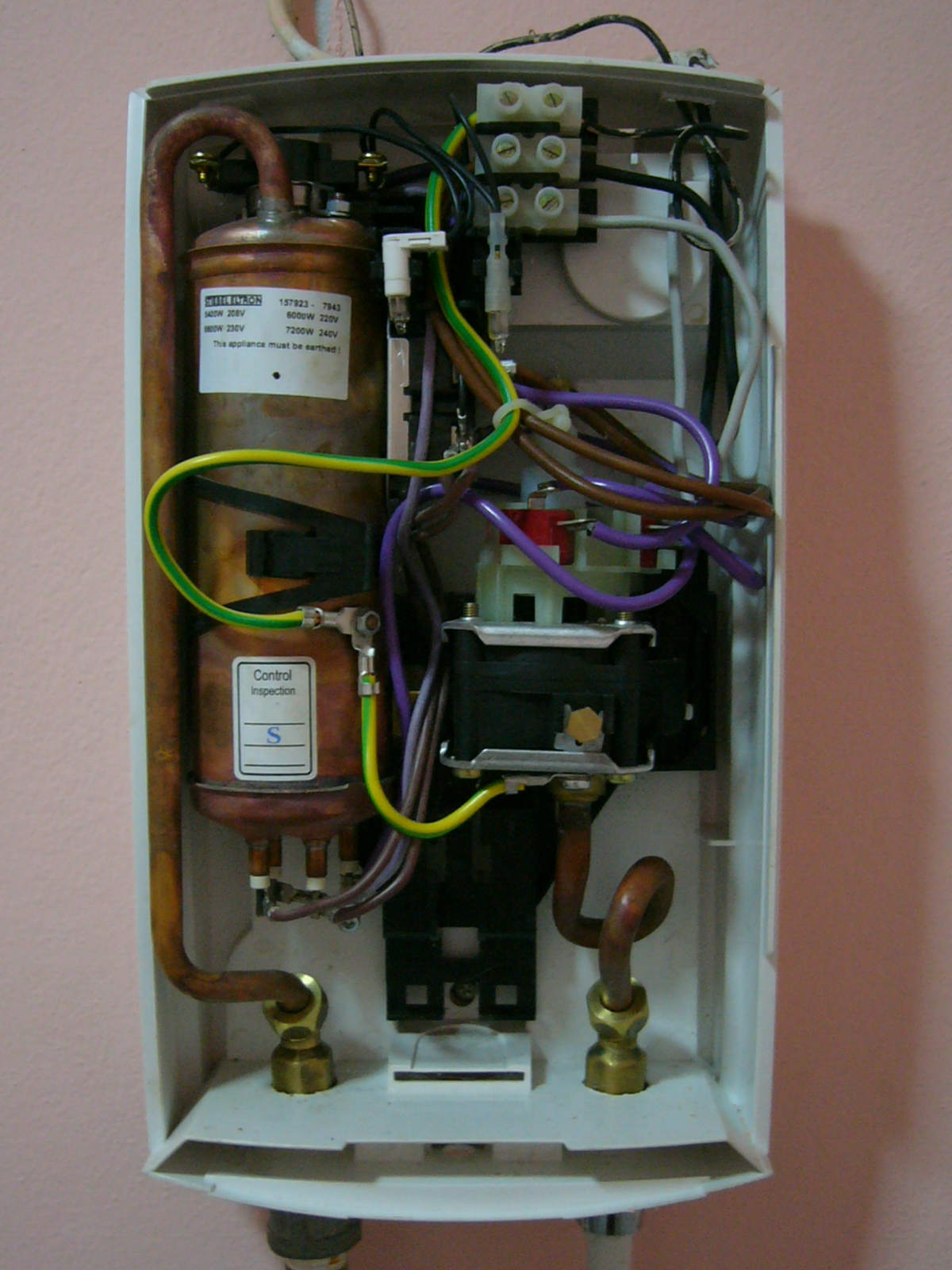
The inside of a hydraulically operated two-stage tankless heater, heated by single phase electric power. The copper tank contains heating elements with 7.2 kW maximum power.

Tankless water heaters—also called instantaneous, continuous flow, inline, flash, on-demand, or instant-on water heaters—are gaining in popularity. These high-power water heaters instantly heat water as it flows through the device, and do not retain any water internally except for what is in the heat exchanger coil. Copper heat exchangers are preferred in these units because of their high thermal conductivity and ease of fabrication.

Tankless heaters may be installed throughout a household at more than one point-of-use (POU), far from a central water heater, or larger centralized models may still be used to provide all the hot water requirements for an entire house. The main advantages of tankless water heaters are a plentiful continuous flow of hot water (as compared to a limited flow of continuously heated hot water from conventional tank water heaters), and potential energy savings under some conditions. The main disadvantage is their much higher initial costs; a US study in Minnesota reported a 20- to 40-year payback for the tankless water heaters. In a comparison to a less efficient natural gas fired hot water tank, on-demand natural gas will cost 30% more over its useful life.

Stand-alone appliances for quickly heating water for domestic usage are known in North America as tankless or on demand water heaters. In some places, they are called multipoint heaters, geysers or ascots. In Australia and New Zealand they are called instantaneous hot water units. In Argentina they are called calefones. In that country calefones use gas instead of electricity, although gas powered tankless water heaters can also be found in other countries. A similar wood-fired appliance was known as the chip heater.

A common arrangement where hot-water space heating is employed is for a boiler also to heat potable water, providing a continuous supply of hot water without extra equipment. Appliances that can supply both space-heating and domestic hot water are called combination (or combi) boilers. Though on-demand heaters provide a continuous supply of domestic hot water, the rate at which they can produce it is limited by the thermodynamics of heating water from the available fuel supplies.

=== Electric shower heads ===
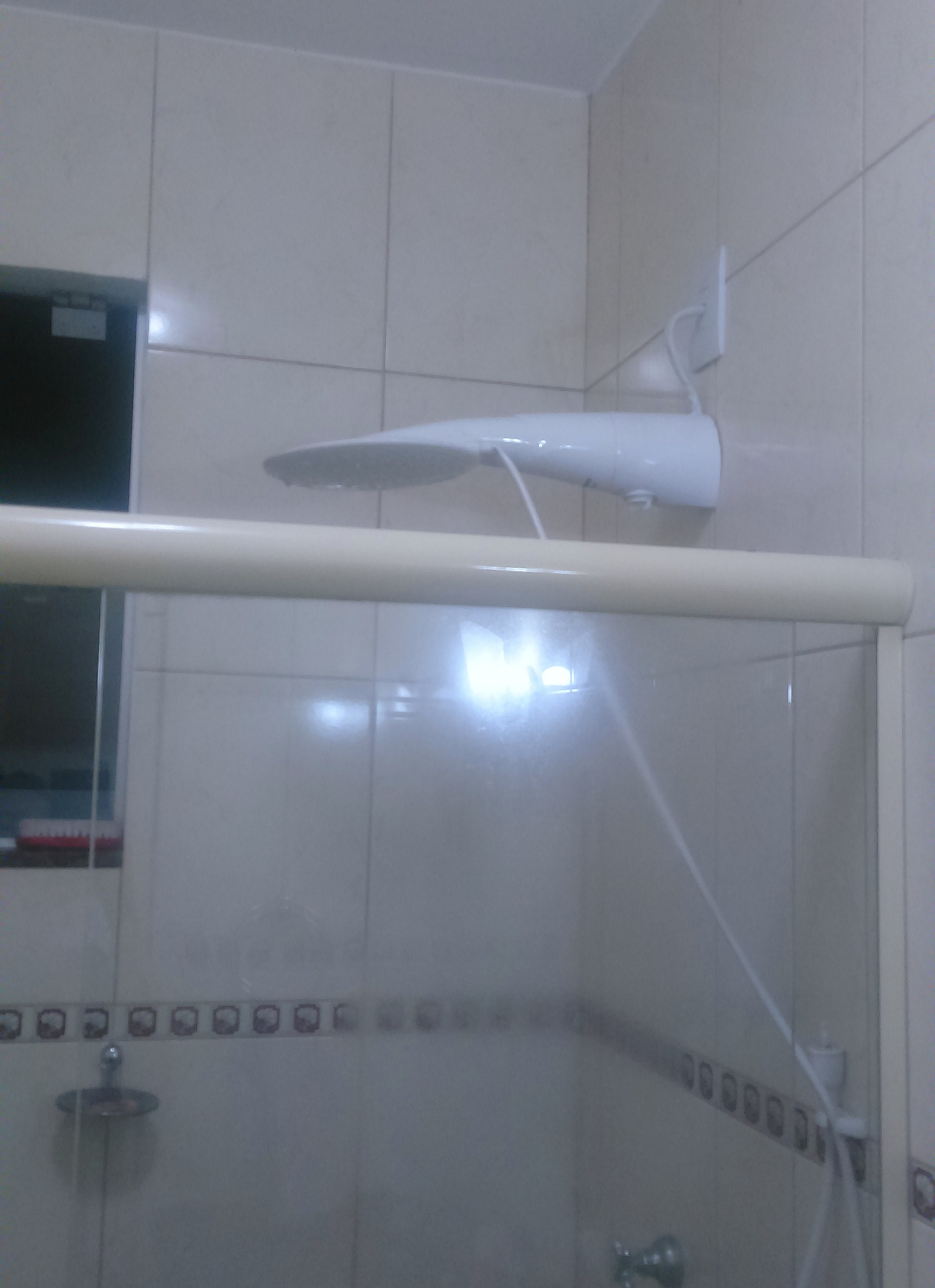
Electric shower

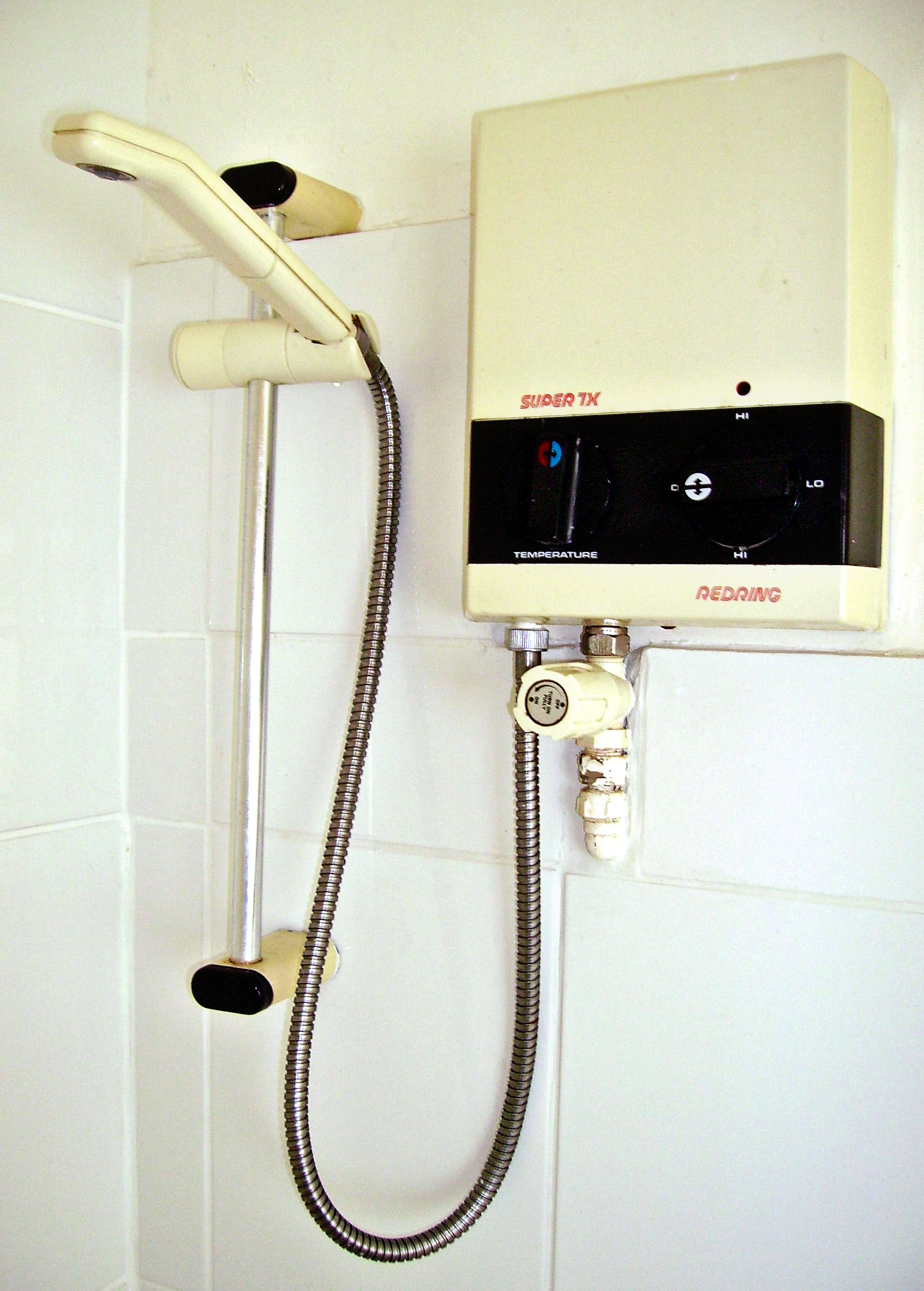
In the UK

An electric shower or electric shower head are self-heating shower heads that use an immersion heater which is turned on with the flow of water. A group of separate electric heating elements can be switched to offer different heating levels or with an electronic temperature control (using hi-power dimmer). They are specialized point-of-use tankless water heaters and are widely used in some countries such as Brazil and to a lesser extent in Central America. In some countries such as the UK, Malaysia and the Philippines, a tankless electric heater can be placed directly in the shower wall.

Invented in Brazil by Francisco Canhos in the 1930s due to a lack of central gas distribution and used frequently since the 1940s, the electric shower is a home appliance often seen in South and Central American countries due to the higher costs of gas distribution, combined with households that in most cases do not support conventional water heaters, as they do not have dedicated hot water piping. Earlier models were made of chromed copper or brass, which were expensive and carried an electric shock risk due to the metallic exterior, but since 1970, units made of injected plastics are popular due to low prices similar to that of a hair dryer.

Electric showers have a simple electric system, working like a coffee maker, but with a larger water flow. A pressure switch turns on the device when enough water flows through it, pressurizing the interior. Once the water is stopped, the device turns off automatically. An ordinary electric shower often but not always has three heat settings: high for winter (5.5 kW), low for summer (2.5 kW), or cold (0 W) to use when a central heater system is available or in hot seasons. Higher power (up to 7.5 KW) and lower power (up to 3.2 KW) versions are also made, as well as versions with 4 heat settings or a variable heat setting controlled by a semiconductor device such as a triac, and a dial or stick that is rotated by the user.

=== Solar water heaters ===
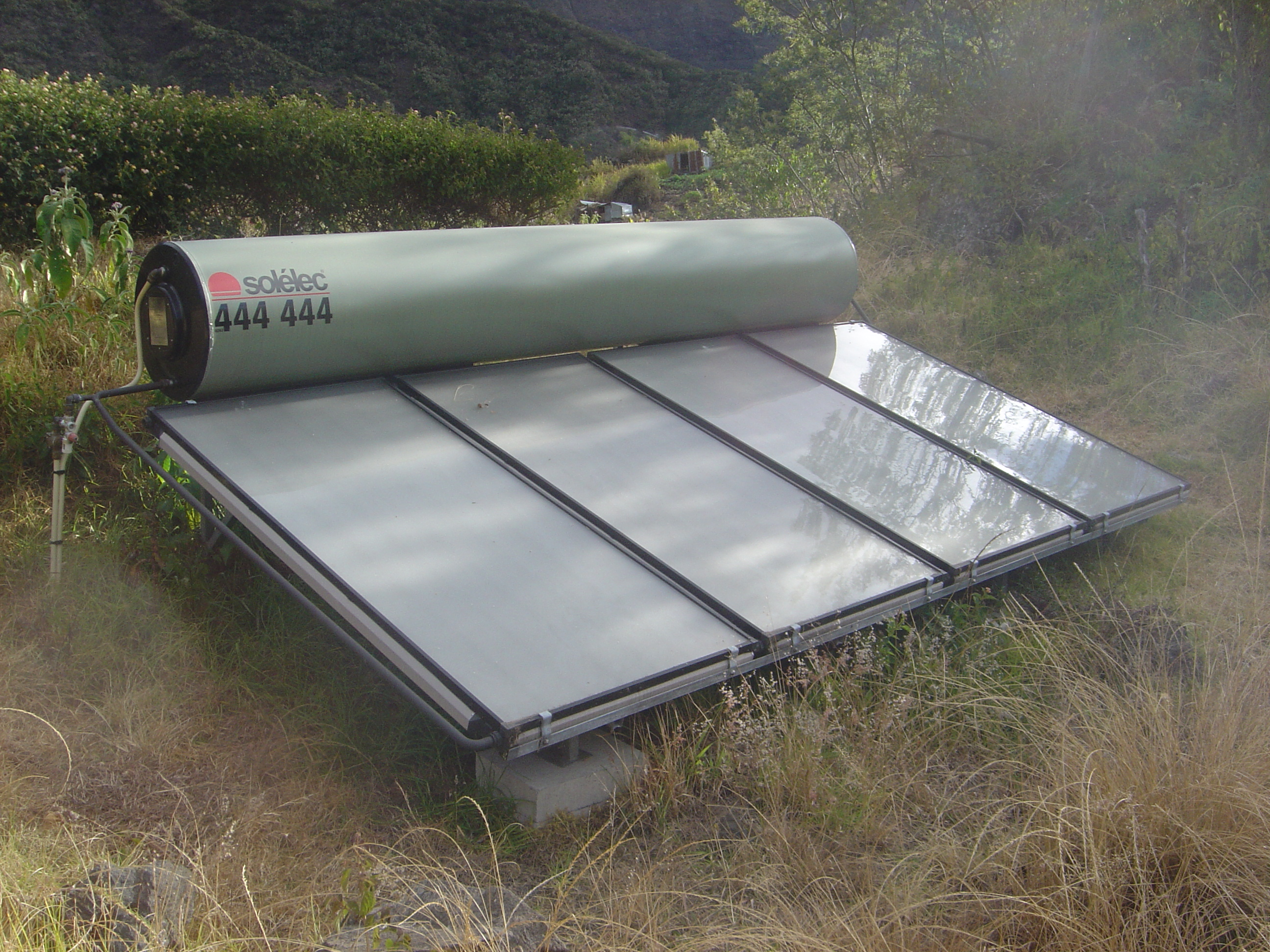
Direct-gain solar heater panels with integrated storage tank

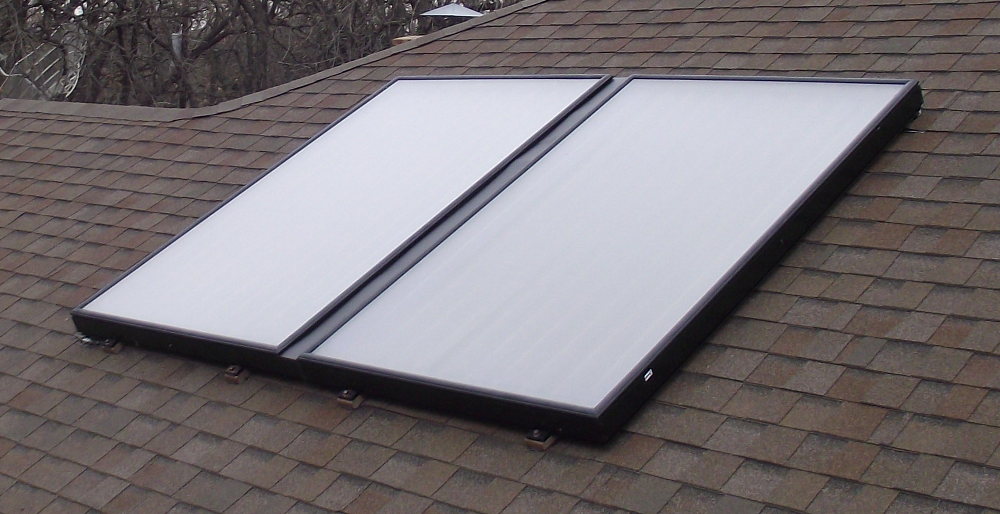
Flat-plate solar thermal collector, viewed from roof-level

Increasingly, solar powered water heaters are being used. Their solar collectors are installed outside dwellings, typically on the roof or walls or nearby, and the potable hot water storage tank is typically a pre-existing or new conventional water heater, or a water heater specifically designed for solar thermal. In Cyprus and Israel 90 percent of homes have solar water heating systems.

The most basic solar thermal models are the direct-gain type, in which the potable water is directly sent into the collector. Many such systems are said to use integrated collector storage (ICS), as direct-gain systems typically have storage integrated within the collector. Heating water directly is inherently more efficient than heating it indirectly via heat exchangers, but such systems offer very limited freeze protection (if any), can easily heat water to temperatures unsafe for domestic use, and ICS systems suffer from severe heat loss on cold nights and cold, cloudy days.

By contrast, indirect or closed-loop systems do not allow potable water through the panels, but rather pump a heat transfer fluid (either water or a water/antifreeze mix) through the panels. After collecting heat in the panels, the heat transfer fluid flows through a heat exchanger, transferring its heat to the potable hot water. When the panels are cooler than the storage tank or when the storage tank has already reached its maximum temperature, the controller in closed-loop systems stops the circulation pumps. In a drainback system, the water drains into a storage tank contained in conditioned or semi-conditioned space, protected from freezing temperatures. With antifreeze systems, however, the pump must be run if the panel temperature gets too hot (to prevent degradation of the antifreeze) or too cold (to prevent the water/antifreeze mixture from freezing.)

Flat panel collectors are typically used in closed-loop systems. Flat panels, which often resemble skylights, are the most durable type of collector, and they also have the best performance for systems designed for temperatures within 56 °C (100 °F) of ambient temperature. Flat panels are regularly used in both pure water and antifreeze systems.

Another type of solar collector is the evacuated tube collector, which are intended for cold climates that do not experience severe hail and/or applications where high temperatures are needed (i.e., over 94 °C [201 °F]). Placed in a rack, evacuated tube collectors form a row of glass tubes, each containing absorption fins attached to a central heat-conducting rod (copper or condensation-driven). The evacuated description refers to the vacuum created in the glass tubes during the manufacturing process, which results in very low heat loss and lets evacuated tube systems achieve extreme temperatures, far in excess of water's boiling point.

=== Geothermal heating ===
In countries like Iceland and New Zealand, and other volcanic regions, water heating may be done using geothermal heating, rather than combustion.

=== Gravity-fed system ===
Where a space-heating water boiler is employed, the traditional arrangement in the UK and Ireland is to use boiler-heated (primary) water to heat potable (secondary) water contained in a cylindrical vessel (usually made of copper)—which is supplied from a cold water storage vessel or container, usually in the roof space of the building. This produces a fairly steady supply of DHW (domestic hot water) at low static pressure head but usually with a good flow. In most other parts of the world, water heating appliances do not use a cold water storage vessel or container, but heat water at pressures close to that of the incoming mains water supply.

=== Other improvements ===
Other improvements to water heaters include check valve devices at their inlet and outlet, cycle timers, electronic ignition in the case of fuel-using models, sealed air intake systems in the case of fuel-using models, and pipe insulation. The sealed air-intake system types are sometimes called "band-joist" intake units. "High-efficiency" condensing units can convert up to 98% of the energy in the fuel to heating the water. The exhaust gases of combustion are cooled and are mechanically ventilated either through the roof or through an exterior wall. At high combustion efficiencies a drain must be supplied to handle the water condensed out of the combustion products, which are primarily carbon dioxide and water vapor.

In traditional plumbing in the UK, the space-heating boiler is set up to heat a separate hot water cylinder or water heater for potable hot water. Such water heaters are often fitted with an auxiliary electrical immersion heater for use if the boiler is out of action for a time. Heat from the space-heating boiler is transferred to the water heater vessel/container by means of a heat exchanger, and the boiler operates at a higher temperature than the potable hot water supply. Most potable water heaters in North America are completely separate from the space heating units, due to the popularity of HVAC/forced air systems in North America.

Residential combustion water heaters manufactured since 2003 in the United States have been redesigned to resist ignition of flammable vapors and incorporate a thermal cutoff switch, per ANSI Z21.10.1. The first feature attempts to prevent vapors from flammable liquids and gases in the vicinity of the heater from being ignited and thus causing a house fire or explosion. The second feature prevents tank overheating due to unusual combustion conditions. These safety requirements were made in response to homeowners storing, or spilling, gasoline or other flammable liquids near their water heaters and causing fires. Since most of the new designs incorporate some type of flame arrestor screen, they require monitoring to make sure they do not become clogged with lint or dust, reducing the availability of air for combustion. If the flame arrestor becomes clogged, the thermal cutoff may act to shut down the heater.

A wetback stove (NZ), wetback heater (NZ), or back boiler (UK), is a simple household secondary water heater using incidental heat. It typically consists of a hot water pipe running behind a fireplace or stove (rather than hot water storage), and has no facility to limit the heating. Modern wetbacks may run the pipe in a more sophisticated design to assist heat-exchange. These designs are being forced out by government efficiency regulations that do not count the energy used to heat water as 'efficiently' used.

== History ==
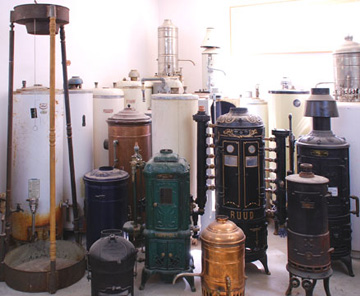
Display of water heaters used in the past

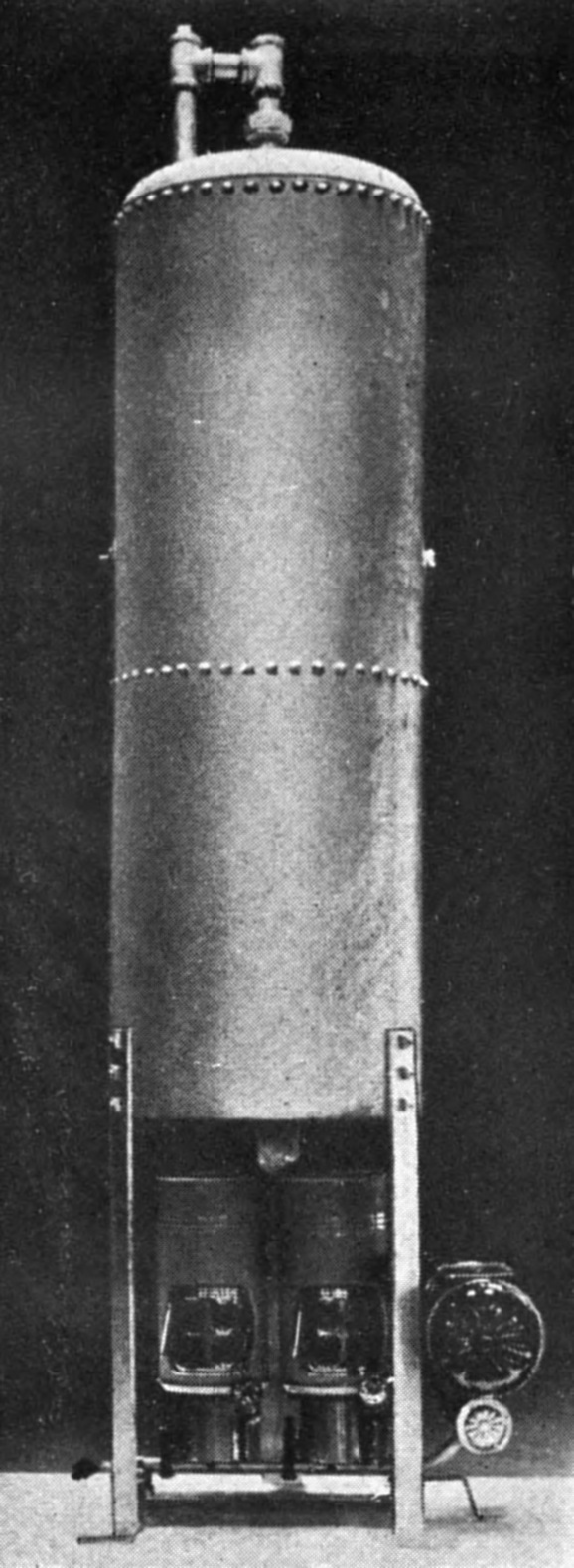
Kerosene water heater, 1917

Another type of water heater developed in Europe predated the storage model. In London, England, in 1868, Benjamin Waddy Maughan, a painter, invented the first instantaneous domestic water heater that did not use solid fuel. Named the geyser after an Icelandic gushing hot spring, Maughan's invention made cold water at the top flow through pipes that were heated by hot gases from a burner at the bottom. Hot water then flowed into a sink or tub. The invention was somewhat dangerous because there was no flue to remove heated gases from the bathroom. A water heater is still sometimes called a geyser in the UK and South Africa.

Maughn's invention influenced the work of a Norwegian mechanical engineer named Edwin Ruud. The first automatic, storage tank-type gas water heater was invented around 1889 by Ruud after he immigrated to Pittsburgh, Pennsylvania (US). The Ruud Manufacturing Company, still in existence today, made many advancements in tank-type and tankless water heater design and operation.

In 1917, Ida Forbes patented her invention of an electric water heater, which was safer than previous gas and wood-fired models, eliminating the risks of fire and burns.

== Thermodynamics and economics ==
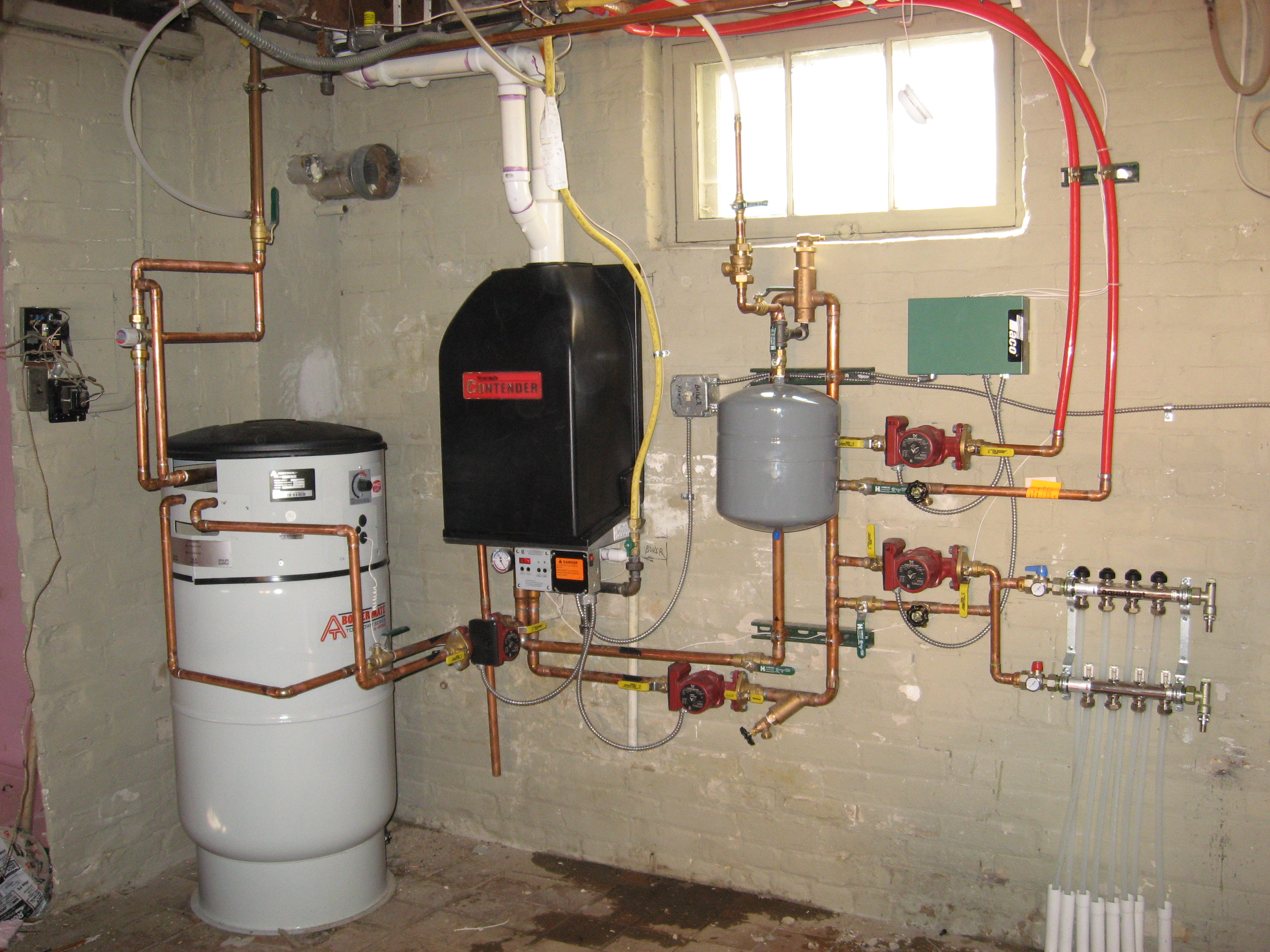
Gas-fired tankless condensing boiler with hot water storage tank (US)

Water typically enters residences in the US at about 10 °C (50 °F), depending on latitude and season. Hot water temperatures of 50 °C (122 °F) are usual for dish-washing, laundry and showering, which requires that the heater raise the water temperature about 40 °C (72 °F) if the hot water is mixed with cold water at the point of use. The Uniform Plumbing Code reference shower flow rate is 9.5 L (2.5 US gal) per minute. Sink and dishwasher usages range from 4–11 L (1–3 US gal) per minute.

Natural gas is often measured by volume or heat content. Common units of measurement by volume are cubic metre or cubic feet at standard conditions or by heat content in kilowatt hours, British thermal units (BTU) or therm, which is equal to 100,000 BTU. A BTU is the energy required to raise one pound of water by one degree Fahrenheit. A US gallon of water weighs 8.3 pounds (3.8 kg). To raise 230 L (60 US gal) of water from 10 °C (50 °F) to 50 °C (122 °F) at 90% efficiency requires 60 × 8.3 × (122 − 50) × 1.11 = 39,840 BTU. A 46 kW (157,000 BTU/h) heater, as might exist in a tankless heater, would take about 15 minutes to do this. At $1 per therm, the cost of the gas would be about 40 cents. In comparison, a typical 230 L (60 US gal) tank electric water heater has a 4.5 kW (15,000 BTU/h) heating element, which at 100% efficient results in a heating time of about 2.34 hours. At $0.16/kWh the electricity would cost $1.68.

Energy efficiencies of water heaters in residential use can vary greatly, particularly depending on manufacturer and model. However, electric heaters tend to be slightly more efficient (not counting power station losses) with recovery efficiency (how efficiently energy transfers to the water) reaching about 98%. Gas-fired heaters have maximum recovery efficiencies of only about 82–94% (the remaining heat is lost with the flue gasses). Overall energy factors can be as low as 80% for electric and 50% for gas systems. Natural gas and propane tank water heaters with energy factors of 62% or greater, as well as electric tank water heaters with energy factors of 93% or greater, are considered high-efficiency units. Energy Star qualified natural gas and propane tank water heaters (as of September 2010) have energy factors of 67% or higher, which is usually achieved using an intermittent pilot together with an automatic flue damper, baffle blowers, or power venting.

Direct electric resistance tank water heaters are not included in the Energy Star program; however, the Energy Star program does include electric heat pump units with energy factors of 200% or higher. Tankless gas water heaters (as of 2015) must have an energy factor of 90% or higher for Energy Star qualification. Since electricity production in thermal plants has efficiency levels ranging from only 15% to slightly over 55% (combined cycle gas turbine), with around 40% typical for thermal power stations, direct resistance electric water heating may be the least energy efficient option.

However, use of a heat pump can make electric water heaters much more energy efficient and lead to a decrease in carbon dioxide emissions, even more so if a low carbon source of electricity is used. Using district heating utilizing waste heat from electricity generation and other industries to heat residences and hot water gives an increased overall efficiency, removing the need for burning fossil fuel or using high energy value electricity to produce heat in the individual home.

Fundamentally, it takes a great deal of energy to heat water, as one may experience when waiting to boil a gallon of water on a stove. For this reason, tankless on-demand water heaters require a powerful energy source. A standard 120V, 15-ampere rated wall electric outlet, by comparison, only sources enough power to warm a disappointingly small amount of water: about 0.17 US gal (0.64 L) per minute at 40 °C (72 °F) temperature elevation.

The energy used by an electric water heater can be reduced by as much as 18% through optimal schedule and temperature control that is based on knowledge of the usage pattern.

=== US minimum requirements ===
On April 16, 2015, as part of the National Appliance Energy Conservation Act (NAECA), new minimum standards for efficiency of residential water heaters set by the United States Department of Energy went into effect. All new gas storage tank water heaters with capacities smaller than 55 US gal (210 L; 46 imp gal) sold in the United States in 2015 or later shall have an energy factor of at least 60% (for 50-US-gallon units, higher for smaller units), increased from the pre-2015 minimum standard of 58% energy factor for 50-US-gallon gas units. Electric storage tank water heaters with capacities less than 55 US gallons sold in the United States shall have an energy factor of at least 95%, increased from the pre-2015 minimum standard of 90% for 50-US-gallon electric units.

Under the 2015 standard, for the first time, storage water heaters with capacities of 55 US gallons or larger now face stricter efficiency requirements than those of 50 US gallons or less. Under the pre-2015 standard, a 75 US gal (280 L; 62 imp gal) gas storage water heater with a nominal input of 22 kW (75,000 BTU/h) or less was able to have an energy factor as low as 53%, while under the 2015 standard, the minimum energy factor for a 75-US-gallon gas storage tank water heater is now 74%, which can only be achieved by using condensing technology. Storage water heaters with a nominal input of 22 kW (75,000 BTU/h) or greater are not currently affected by these requirements, since energy factor is not defined for such units. An 80 US gal (300 L; 67 imp gal) electric storage tank water heater was able to have a minimum energy factor of 86% under the pre-2015 standard, while under the 2015 standard, the minimum energy factor for an 80-gallon electric storage tank water heater is now 197%, which is only possible with heat pump technology. This rating measures efficiency at the point of use.

Depending on how electricity is generated, overall efficiency may be much lower. For example, in a traditional coal plant, only about 30–35% of the energy in the coal ends up as electricity on the other end of the generator. Losses on the electrical grid (including line losses and voltage transformation losses) reduce electrical efficiency further. According to data from the Energy Information Administration, transmission and distribution losses in 2005 consumed 6.1% of net generation. In contrast, 90% of natural gas's energy value is delivered to the consumer. (In neither case is the energy expended exploring, developing and extracting coal or natural gas resources included in the quoted efficiency numbers.) Gas tankless water heaters shall have an energy factor of 82% or greater under the 2015 standards, which corresponds to the pre-2015 Energy Star standard.

In 2022 the Department of Energy proposed rules that would take effect in 2026 and would effectively eliminate inefficient non-condensing gas water heaters in commercial buildings. Non-condensing models waste heat, while condensing models capture and used otherwise lost energy. The change will reduce emissions by 38 million tons of carbon dioxide over 30 years and reduce buildings' energy costs.

== Water heater safety ==
=== Explosion hazard ===
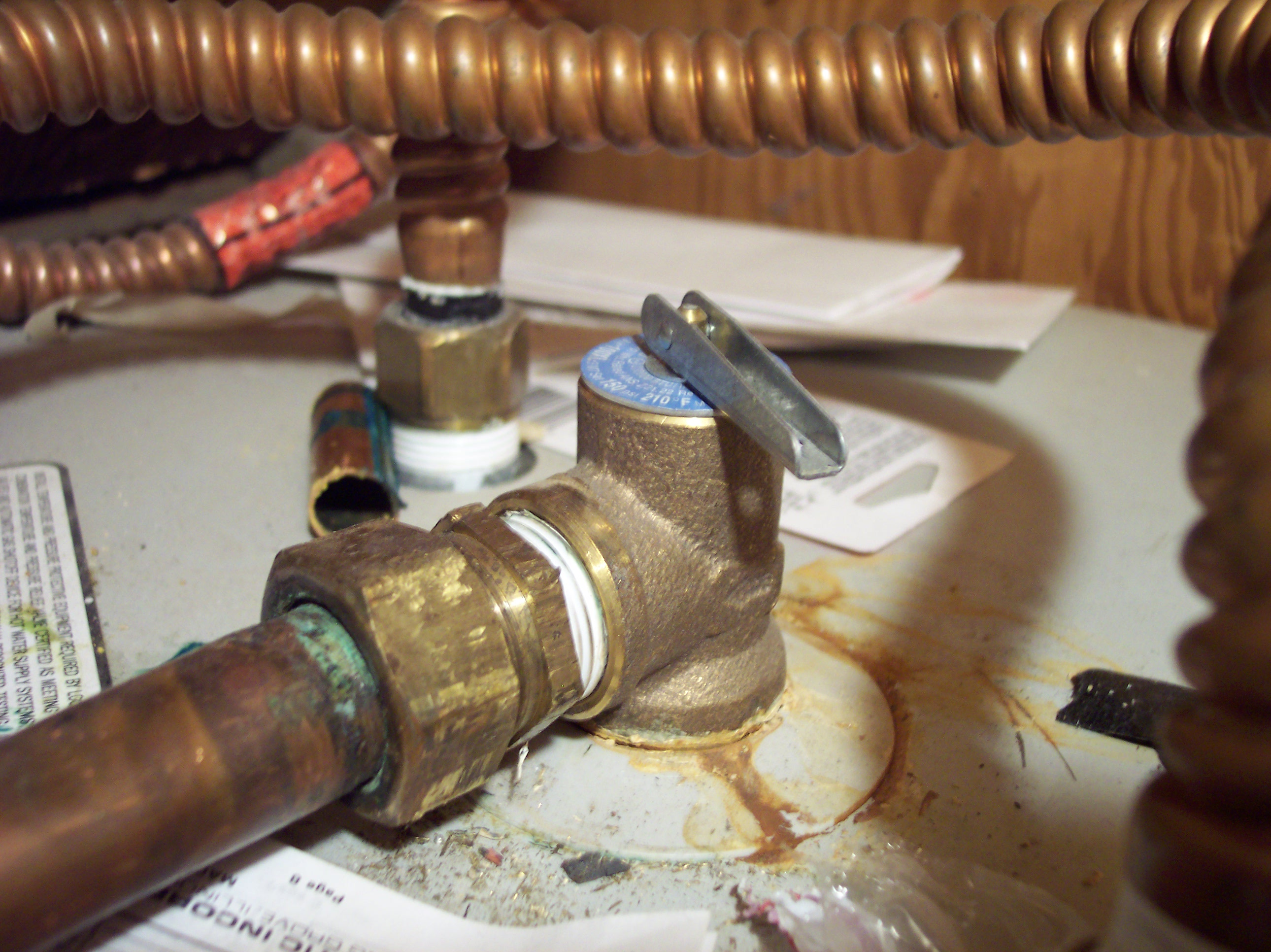
Temperature/pressure safety valve installed atop a tank-type water heater (US)

Water heaters potentially can explode and cause significant damage, injury, or death if certain safety devices are not installed. A safety device called a temperature and pressure relief (T&P or TPR) valve, is normally fitted on the top of the water heater to dump water if the temperature or pressure becomes too high. Most plumbing codes require that a discharge pipe be connected to the valve to direct the flow of discharged hot water to a drain, typically a nearby floor drain, or outside the living space. Some building codes allow the discharge pipe to terminate in the garage.

If a gas or propane fired water heater is installed in a garage or basement, many plumbing codes require that it be elevated at least 18 in (46 cm) above the floor to reduce the potential for fire or explosion due to spillage or leakage of combustible liquids in the garage. Furthermore, certain local codes mandate that tank-type heaters in new and retrofit installations must be secured to an adjacent wall by a strap or anchor to prevent tipping over and breaking the water and gas pipes in the event of an earthquake.

For older houses where the water heater is part of the space heating boiler, and plumbing codes allow, some plumbers install an automatic gas shutoff (such as the "Watts 210") in addition to a TPR valve. When the device senses that the temperature reaches 99 °C (210 °F), it shuts off the gas supply and prevents further heating. In addition, an expansion tank or exterior pressure relief valve must be installed to prevent pressure buildup in the plumbing from rupturing pipes, valves, or the water heater.

=== Thermal burns (scalding) ===
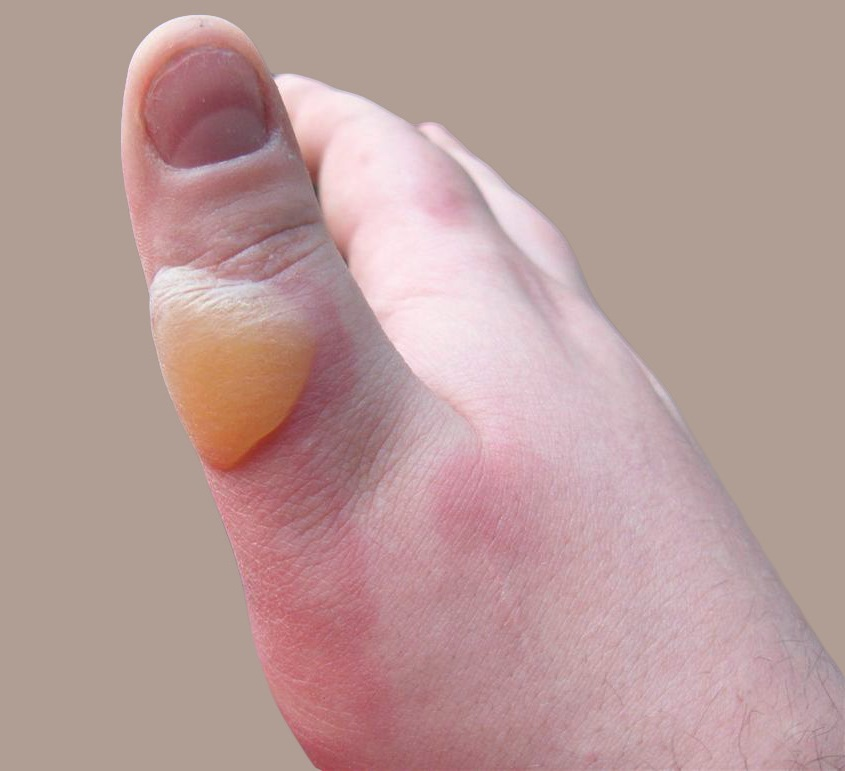
Scalding injury to right hand

Scalding is a serious concern with any water heater. Human skin burns quickly at high temperature, in less than 5 seconds at 60 °C (140 °F), but much slower at 53 °C (127 °F) — it takes a full minute for a second degree burn. Older people and children often receive serious scalds due to disabilities or slow reaction times. In the United States and elsewhere it is common practice to put a tempering valve or thermostatic mixing valve on the outlet of the water heater. The result of automatically mixing hot and cold water via a tempering valve is referred to as "tempered water".

A tempering valve mixes enough cold water with the hot water from the heater to keep the outgoing water temperature fixed at a more moderate temperature, often set to 50 °C (122 °F). Without a tempering valve, reduction of the water heater's setpoint temperature is the most direct way to reduce scalding. However, for sanitation, hot water is needed at a temperature that can cause scalding. This may be accomplished by using a supplemental heater in an appliance that requires hotter water. Most residential dishwashing machines, for example, include an internal electric heating element for increasing the water temperature above that provided by a domestic water heater.

=== Bacterial contamination ===
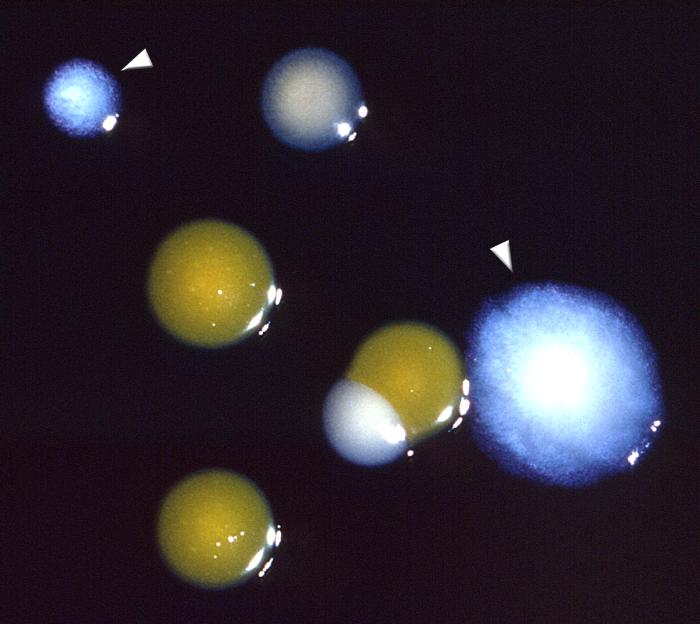
Bacterial colonies of Legionella pneumophila (indicated by arrows)

Two conflicting safety issues affect water heater temperature—the risk of scalding from excessively hot water greater than 55 °C (131 °F), and the risk of incubating bacteria colonies, particularly Legionella, in water that is not hot enough to kill them. Both risks are potentially life-threatening and are balanced by setting the water heater's thermostat to 55 °C (131 °F). The European Guidelines for Control and Prevention of Travel Associated Legionnaires' Disease recommend that hot water should be stored at 60 °C (140 °F) and distributed so that a temperature of at least 50 °C (122 °F) and preferably 55 °C (131 °F) is achieved within one minute at points of use.

If there is a dishwasher without a booster heater, it may require a water temperature within a range of 57–60 °C (135–140 °F) for optimum cleaning, but tempering valves set to no more than 55 °C (131 °F) can be applied to faucets to avoid scalding. Tank temperatures above 60 °C (140 °F) may produce limescale deposits, which could later harbor bacteria, in the water tank. Higher temperatures may also increase etching of glassware in the dishwasher.

Tank thermostats are not a reliable guide to the internal temperature of the tank. Gas-fired water tanks may have no temperature calibration shown. An electric thermostat shows the temperature at the elevation of the thermostat, but water lower in the tank can be considerably cooler. An outlet thermometer is a better indication of water temperature.

In the renewable energy industry (solar and heat pumps, in particular) the conflict between daily thermal Legionella control and high temperatures, which may drop system performance, is subject to heated debate. In a paper seeking a green exemption from normal Legionellosis safety standards, Europe's top CEN solar thermal technical committee TC 312 asserts that a 50% fall in performance would occur if solar water heating systems were heated to the base daily. However some solar simulator analysis work using Polysun 5 suggests that an 11% energy penalty is a more likely figure. Whatever the context, both energy efficiency and scalding safety requirements push in the direction of considerably lower water temperatures than the legionella pasteurization temperature of around 60 °C (140 °F).

Legionella pneumophila has been detected at the point of use downstream from horizontally mounted electric water heaters with volumes of 150 liters.

However, legionella can be safely and easily controlled with good design and engineering protocols. For instance raising the temperature of water heaters once a day or even once every few days to 55 °C (131 °F) at the coldest part of the water heater for 30 minutes effectively controls legionella. In all cases and in particular energy efficient applications, Legionnaires' disease is more often than not the result of engineering design issues that do not take into consideration the impact of stratification or low flow.

It is also possible to control Legionella risks by chemical treatment of the water. This technique allows lower water temperatures to be maintained in the pipework without the associated Legionella risk. The benefit of lower pipe temperatures is that the heat loss rate is reduced and thus the energy consumption is reduced.

== See also ==
- Aquastat
- Architectural engineering
- Condensing boiler
- Electric water boiler
- Energy conservation
- Heat trap
- Joule heating
- Home appliance
- Outdoor wood-fired boiler
- Solar water heating
- Thermal immersion circulator
- Water heat recycling
