= Insulative paint =

Type of paint in which can be used to coat a surface to reduce heat transfer

Insulative paints, or insulating paints, are a specially designed type of paint in which can be used to coat a surface (e.g a wall) to reduce heat transfer as well as increase the thermal insulating property (R-value). Insulative paints use a technology where a broad spectrum thermally reflective coating is applied to a specific type of micro-spheres to block heat radiation in a larger range of thermal energy (heat) to dissipate heat rapidly. This type of coated thermally reflective material (coated micro-sphere) reduces heat transfer through the coating with 90% of solar infrared radiation and 85% of ultraviolet radiation being radiated back from the coated surface[1]

An "insulative" or "insulating" paint works bi-directionally (reflects heat coming from either direction toward the painted surface. An example of this would be an exterior wall of a building to which an "insulative" or "insulating" paint has been applied. Solar induced heat (direct sunlight) is reflected from the surface as well as heat (winter months) that is migrating through the wall outward toward the colder outside air. A "thermal Image" or infra-red photograph will clearly show the reduction of winter time heat loss from a home through areas that have been painted with a true "insulative" or "insulating" paint.

The ability to reflect or block heat from all sources such as fireplaces, heaters, and radiators inside a building as well as sunlight is the value of a true "insulative" or "insulating" paint. These products reduce the work (heat loading) that "resistance insulation" such a fiberglass, foam, and rock wool have to do. These are typical insulation materials used in walls as well as ceilings of buildings.

So far no manufacturer has provided independent test results to substantiate claims of improved performance over standard paint technology. All independent tests have shown that the proprietary formulas offer no advantages over standard acrylic paint. In spite of extensive "web presence" several of these companies appear to be "ghost ships" operating under a cloak of obscurity offered by internet sales and unable to provide local representation or product stocks.

== Other types of "insulating paint" ==
"Insulative" or "insulating paint" is not proven by any existing scientific methodology.

== Deception and fraud ==
There are deceptive companies that are marketing "insulating paint" for many applications who are engaged in a scam, and several such companies have been forced to cease their marketing practices after receiving warning letters from the Federal Trade Commission.

These companies are merely riding the coat tails of legitimate companies engaged in the ceramic and coatings industries, and are more marketing than substance. They incorporate materials such as glass spheres or fly ash into low quality paints. Scammers have been selling “insulating” paint to gullible consumers for at least 27 years. Two companies that offer insulating paint are Super Therm and Nansulate. The product names continue to change as consumers report continued deception to the Better Business Bureau and other venues.The insulative paints are currently marketed under the Synavax and Syneffex names. The reports from the Better Business Bureau indicate that these companies are only shell companies, and if gullible consumers actually send funds for the promised products, the funds will be kept and no products will be shipped.

The CCHRC (Cold Climate Housing Research Center) researchers concluded that "there was no discernible difference in the performance of the Super Therm or Nansulate in comparison to regular latex paint during the energy monitoring tests." They also said, "Such products have the primary goal of reducing solar absorption to decrease air conditioning loads. Such considerations were not included in our tests, as they are not considered of primary importance for Alaska's climate."

== Use in the space program ==
The areas of the Space Shuttle that had the highest heat loading due to friction upon the shuttle's re-entry with the Earth's atmosphere were coated with a black carbon material which emitted over 90% of the friction-induced heat that the shuttle experienced upon re-entry.

Although the ceramic technology was developed by NASA, no one has worked "with" NASA in developing products of this type or their associated coatings. Any statements to the contrary are merely marketing and misleading.

The technology was considered declassified and released to the public in 1996. It is then up to the world marketplace to take the work of NASA scientists and researchers, and develop products from that point. Since 1976, NASA has featured between 40 and 50 commercial products which have benefited mankind worldwide as a result of NASA technology in their annual premiere publication Spinoff Magazine. In 2003, after exhaustive research into how their technology was utilized, NASA selected the original Spinoff industry leader.

== See also ==
- Passive cooling
- Radiant barrier
- Reflective surfaces (geoengineering)
