= Thermal relief =

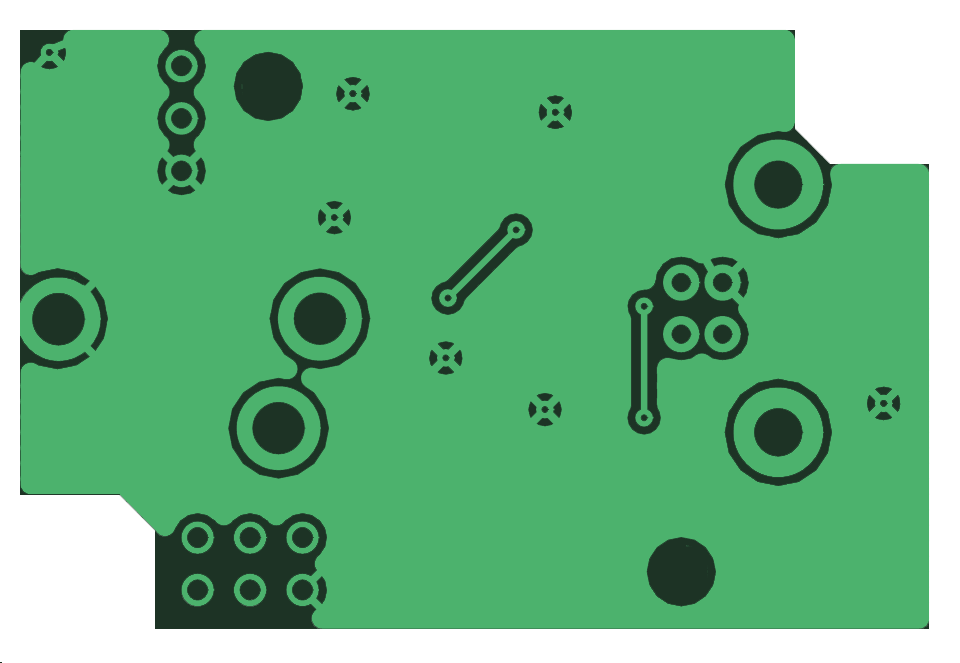
Thermal pads can be seen in several locations on this printed circuit board (PCB), in particular, the bottom pad of the three vertical pads in the top left corner.

A thermal relief pad, thermal pad or simply thermal, is a printed circuit board (PCB) pad connected to a copper pour using a thermal connection. It looks like a normal pad with copper "spokes" connecting it to the surrounding copper.

A typical pad on a printed circuit board is only connected to a few narrow tracks. A pad directly connected to the copper pour is difficult to solder, since the heat quickly leaks away from the pad into the copper pour due to high thermal conductivity of copper. A thermal connection restricts the heat flow, making the pad easier to solder. Via holes that only connect one layer to another, without having soldering wires or pins into the hole, do not normally need thermal restriction.

Wire-leaded components may require the thermal relief pattern to be customized or even omitted when carrying radio-frequency currents (where the additional inductance would be problematic), or where very high current densities are expected (where the spokes of the thermal relief may act as a fuse). In these cases the parts may require additional hand soldering during assembly.

== See also ==
- Heat trap
- Thermal barrier
