= Energy rating =

Energy rating may refer to:

- Energy rating label, an appliance energy efficiency rating used in Australia and New Zealand
- European Union energy label, an appliance energy efficiency rating used in Europe
- EnergyGuide, an appliance energy efficiency rating used in the United States
- EnerGuide, labeling and rating of the energy consumption or energy efficiency of specific products used in Canada
- Building energy rating
- Energy efficiency rating, a score applied to dwellings in the Australian Capital Territory
- House Energy Rating, a building's thermal performance for residential homes in Australia
- Home energy rating, a measurement of a home's energy efficiency, used primarily in the United States
- National Home Energy Rating, an accreditation scheme for energy assessors and a rating scale for the energy efficiency of housing in the United Kingdom

== See also ==
- Energy Star, an international standard for energy efficient consumer products originated in the United States
- Energy input labeling
- Ecolabel
- Energy efficiency (disambiguation)
- Energy Efficiency Ratio or EER, a figure of merit for the efficiency of air conditioners, used in the United States
