= Energy Performance Certificate (United Kingdom) =

Scheme for rating the energy efficiency of buildings

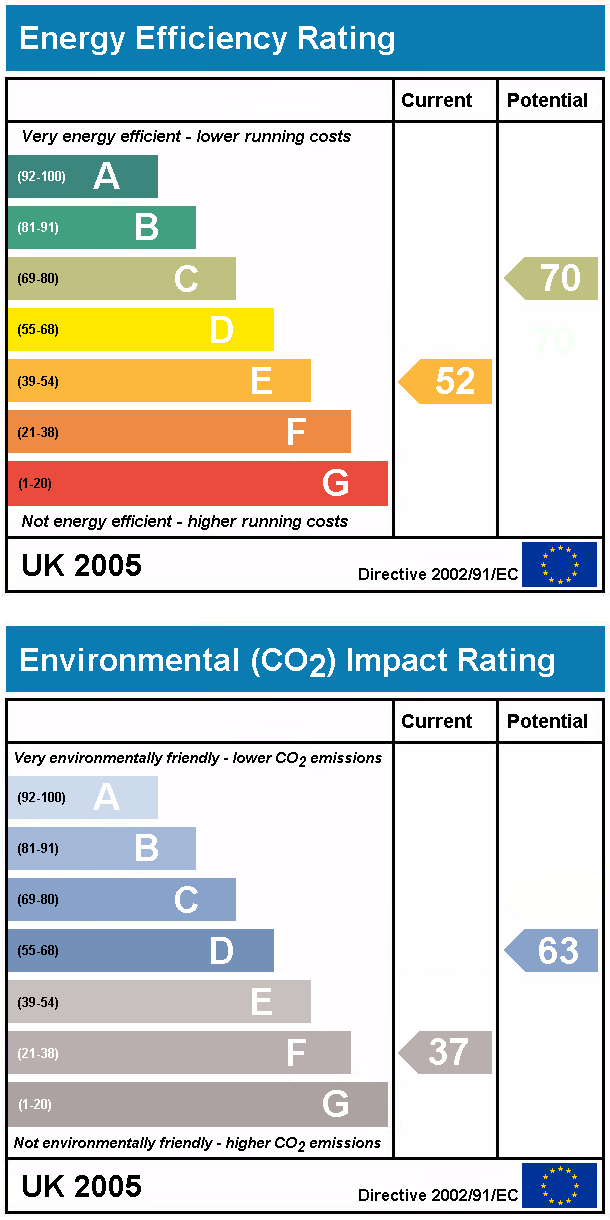
Home energy performance rating charts

Energy performance certificates (EPCs) are a rating scheme to summarise the energy efficiency of buildings. The building is given a rating between A (Very efficient) - G (Inefficient). The EPC will also include tips about the most cost-effective ways to improve the home energy rating. Energy performance certificates are used in many countries.

== Legislative history ==
EPCs are administered and regulated for separately in (a) England and Wales, (b) Scotland and (c) Northern Ireland.

EPCs were introduced in England and Wales on 1 August 2007 as part of Home Information Packs (HIPs) for domestic properties with four or more bedrooms. Over time this requirement was extended to smaller properties. When the requirement for HIPs was removed in May 2010, the requirement for EPCs continued. Rental properties, which have a certificate valid for 10 years, became required on a new tenancy commencing on or after 1 October 2008.

The legislative basis for EPCs in the UK is European Union Directive 2010/31/EU as transposed into UK law by:

- The Energy Performance of Buildings (England and Wales) Regulations 2012 (S.I. 2012/3318) (as amended), in relation to England and Wales,
- The Energy Performance of Buildings (Scotland) Regulations 2008 (S.S.I 2008/309) (as amended), in relation to Scotland,
- The Energy Performance of Buildings (Certificates and Inspections) Regulations (Northern Ireland) 2008 (S.I. 2008/170) (as amended), in relation to Northern Ireland.

== Procedure ==
The energy assessment needed to produce an EPC is performed by a qualified and accredited energy assessor who visits the property, examines key items such as cavity wall, floor and loft insulation, domestic boiler, hot water tank, radiators, heating controls windows for double glazing, and so on. They then input the observations into a software program which performs the calculation of energy efficiency. The program gives a single number for the rating of energy efficiency, and a recommended value of the potential for improvement. There are similar figures for environmental impact. A table of estimated annual energy bills (and the potential for improvement) is also presented, but without any reference to householder bills. The householder will have to pay for the survey, which costs around £75 - £100 for a four bedroom house. The exercise is entirely non-invasive, so the software will make assumptions on the insulation properties of various elements of the property based on age and construction type. The assessor has the ability to over-ride these assumptions if visual or written evidence is provided to support the presence of insulation which may have been subsequently installed.

== Domestic EPCs ==
The calculation of the energy rating on the EPC is based on the Standard Assessment Procedure (SAP). Existing dwellings are assessed using Reduced Data SAP (RdSAP), a simplified version of the SAP methodology that requires fewer data inputs. SAP and RdSAP are derived from the UK Building Research Establishment's Domestic Energy Model (BREDEM), which was originally developed in the 1980s and also underlies the NHER Rating. EPCs are produced by domestic energy assessors who are registered under an approved certification scheme. The first and second EPCs in Northern Ireland were produced by Campbell Morris DEA epcni.co.uk, for the (then) Department of Finance and Personnel.

=== Property details ===
The certificate contains the following property details:

- property address
- property type (for example detached house)
- date of inspection
- certificate date and serial number
- total floor area.

The total floor area is the area contained within the external walls of the property. The figure includes internal walls, stairwells and the like, but excludes garages, porches, areas less than 1.5 metres (4 ft 11 in) high, balconies and any similar area that is not an internal part of the dwelling.

=== The A to G scale ===
Energy performance certificates present the energy efficiency of dwellings on a scale of A to G. The most efficient homes – which should have the lowest fuel bills – are in band A. The certificate uses the same scale to define the impact a home has on the environment. Better-rated homes should have less impact through carbon dioxide (CO_{2}) emissions. The average property in the UK is in band D.

=== Domestic RHI yardstick ===
The EPC will become more significant from April 2014 when Domestic Renewable Heat Incentives (RHI) become available. The amount of the deemed expected annual heat use for a domestic property can be obtained from the EPC and this will determine the amount of Domestic RHI which is payable on installing renewable heat options like ground source heat pumps and solar thermal collectors.

=== EPC recommendations ===
The certificate includes recommendations on ways to improve the home's energy efficiency to save money. The accuracy of the recommendations will depend on the inspection standards applied by the inspector, which may be variable. Inspectors, who may be Home Inspectors (HIs) or Domestic Energy Assessors (DEAs), are audited by their accreditation bodies in order to maintain standards. The recommendations appear general in tone, but are in fact bespoke to the property in question. The logic by which the RDSAP program makes its recommendations was developed as part of a project to create the RDSAP methodology, which took place during the early years of the 21st century. The EU directive requires the EPC recommendations to be cost effective in improving the energy efficiency of the home, but in addition to presenting the most cost effective options, more expensive options which are less cost effective are also presented. To distinguish them from the more cost effective measures, these are shown in a section described as 'further measures'. Because the EPC is designed to be produced at change of occupancy, it must be relevant to any occupier and it therefore must make no allowance for the particular preferences of the current occupier.

=== Exempt properties ===
Properties exempt from the Housing Act 2004 are:

- Non-residential, such as offices, shops, warehouses.
- Mixed use, a dwelling house which part of a business (farm, shop, petrol station)
- Unsafe properties, a property that poses a serious health and safety risk to occupants or visitors
- Properties to be demolished, properties that are due to be demolished where the marketing of the property, all the relevant documents and planning permission exists.
- Listed buildings (Recast of EPC requirements from 9 January 2013)*
- Stand alone buildings of less than 50m^{2} (Recast of EPC requirements from 9 January 2013)
- Buildings of religion or worship (Recast of EPC requirements from 9 January 2013)
- Residential buildings with use of less than 4 months per year (Recast of EPC requirements from 9 January 2013)

The possible exemption of listed buildings has always been a contentious issue. As a devolved issue, no exemption of listed buildings exists under the Scottish Regulations. In England & Wales, listed buildings are only exempt "...in so far as compliance with certain minimum energy performance requirements would unacceptably alter their character or appearance." The only way to determine whether an EPC will have recommendations that would unacceptably alter the appearance or character of the listed dwelling is lodge an EPC and find out.

== Non-domestic energy performance certificates ==
In addition to the requirements in relation to dwellings there is also a requirement for EPCs on the sale, rent or construction of buildings other than dwellings with a floor area greater than 50m^{2} from 6 April 2008, that contain fixed services that condition the interior environment.

Properties that are exempt from requiring a domestic EPC will generally require a non-domestic energy performance certificate, which was also required by the Energy Performance of Buildings Directive. Non-dwellings are "responsible for almost 20 per cent of the UK's energy consumption and carbon emissions."

All non-domestic EPCs must be carried out by, or under the direct supervision of, a trained non-domestic energy assessor, registered with an approved accreditation body. The Department for Levelling Up, Housing and Communities (DLUHC), formerly the Ministry for Housing, Communities and Local Government (MHCLG), has arranged for a publicly accessible central register

There are three levels of building, Level 3, Level 4 and Level 5. The complexity and the services used by that building will determine which level it falls under. The Commercial Energy Assessor must be qualified to the level of the building to carry out the inspection.

From October 2008 all buildings including factories, offices, retail premises and public sector buildings - must have an EPC whenever the building is sold, built or rented. Public buildings in England and Wales (but not Scotland) also require a display energy certificate showing actual energy use, and not just the theoretical energy rating. From January 2009 inspections for air conditioning systems will be introduced.

=== The A to G scale for non-domestic EPCs ===
The A to G scale is a linear scale based on two key points defined as follows:

1. The zero point on the scale is defined as the performance of the building that has zero net annual CO_{2} emissions associated with the use of the fixed building services as defined in the Building Regulations. This is equivalent to a Building Emissions Rate (BER) of zero.
2. The border between grade B and grade C is set at the Standard Emissions rate (SER)† and given an Asset Rating of 50. Because the scale is linear, the boundary between grades D and grade E corresponds to a rating of 100.

†This is based on the actual building dimensions but with standard assumptions for fabric, glazing and building services.

See an example.

== Display energy certificates ==
Display energy certificates (DECs) show the actual energy usage of a building, the Operational Rating, and help the public see the energy efficiency of a building. This is based on the energy consumption of the building as recorded by gas, electricity and other meters. The DEC should be clearly displayed at all times and clearly visible to the public. A DEC is always accompanied by an Advisory Report that lists cost effective measures to improve the energy rating of the building.

Display energy certificates are only required for buildings with a total useful floor area over 500m^{2} that are occupied by a public authority and institution providing a public service to a large number of persons and therefore visited by those persons. The useful floor area limit will be reduced to 250m^{2} in July 2015.

Where the building has a total useful floor area of more than 1,000m^{2}, the DEC is valid for 12 months. The accompanying advisory report is valid for seven years. Where the building has a total useful floor area of between 500m^{2} and 1,000m^{2}, the DEC and advisory report are valid for 10 years.

However, to make it easier for public authorities with multiple buildings on one site to comply with the legislation, a site-based approach for the first year (to October 2009) is allowed where it is not possible to produce individual DECs. This means that only one DEC will need to be produced based on the total energy consumption of the buildings on the site. Public bodies most affected by this relaxation are NHS Trusts, universities and schools.

The requirement for display energy certificates came into effect from 1 October 2008. They were trialled in the UK under an EU-funded project also called "Display" and co-ordinated by Energie-Cités; participants included Durham County Council and the Borough of Milton Keynes.

=== The A to G scale for DECs ===
This is the operational rating for this building. The rating shows the energy performance of the building as it is being used by the occupants, when compared to the performance of other buildings of the same type. A building with performance equal to one typical of its type would therefore have an Operational Rating of 100. A building that resulted in zero CO_{2} emissions would have an Operational Rating of zero, and a building that resulted in twice the typical CO_{2} emissions would have an Operational Rating of 200.

This rating indicates whether the building is being operated above or below average performance for a building of this type.

See an example.

== Criticism ==
As a rating system, EPCs are known to have reliability issues. Non-domestic EPCs are found to have a regression effect where low-rated properties are more likely to obtain higher ratings in the renewal, while high-rated ones tend to get lower ratings. This directly casts doubts on EPC-based policies like Minimum Energy Efficiency Standards.

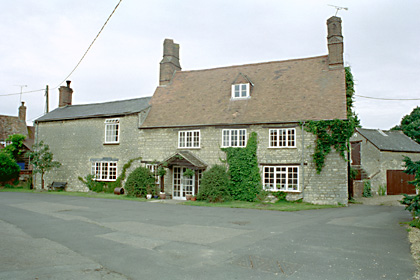
Old College Farmhouse, a listed building dating to the 1600s, with thick walls rates poorly under current rules

EPCs have gained some political controversy, partly reflecting the housing market crisis in the United Kingdom.

Many in the housing industry, such as the Royal Institution of Chartered Surveyors, have criticised the introduction of EPCs, on the grounds of poor quality. Whilst critical, RICS still provided courses on domestic energy assessment, as well as courseware manuals for the professions of domestic energy assessors.

A further objection is often made concerning the quality of inspection made to produce the certificate. It cannot be invasive, so the inspector cannot drill walls or ceilings to determine the state or even existence of any insulation. The energy assessor can either assume the worst ('as built' to Building Regulations for the dwelling's age) or rely on the householder to produce documentary evidence on what may have been installed. This can produce uncertainty about the validity of the output from the assessor's analysis.

Finally, EPCs pose particular problems for the owners of listed buildings, as improvements, such as double glazing, are often barred by the controls on changes to such structures, making it difficult to rectify low ratings.

== See also ==
- Energy efficiency in British housing
- Energy policy of the United Kingdom
- Energy policy of the European Union
- Global warming
- Energy White Paper
- Domestic energy assessor
- House energy rating
- Home energy rating
