= Energy input labeling =

Producers of goods and services

The term energy input labeling involves producers of goods and services determining the amount of energy used to produce their product and then including that information on their product packaging. Energy input labeling is sometimes known by the acronym EIL. Energy input labeling provides the advantage of knowing how much energy was used to produce a product, but it does not indicate how much energy a product uses to operate, such as the European Union energy label or the Energy rating label used in Australia and New Zealand, and is not in itself a standard for energy efficiency such as Energy Saving Trust Recommended or Energy Star.

== History ==
Energy input labeling originated as a project by several energy and economics activists to explore energy accounting.

== Usage in industry ==
Energy input labeling is intended to be easy for producers to implement, At minimum, they can report and label the energy used by their firm to produce products, which is called "Energy Inputs Added", sometimes merely "Energy Added." If a firm is able to also account for all of the energy imputed by its suppliers, then a firm can report and label "Total Energy Inputs" or "Total Energy", but this is rare. Energy Input Labeling is being used and further developed by the European Organization for Sustainability.

== By country ==
=== Japan ===
In Japan, the Top Runner Program is run, in which new appliances are regularly tested on efficiency, and the most efficient ones are made the standard.

== See also ==
- European Union energy label, description of European Union energy label
- EnergyGuide, United States energy label
- Energy rating label, energy label in Australia and New Zealand
- China Energy Label, the energy label used in China
