= Nationwide House Energy Rating Scheme =

Australian thermal performance for residential homes

House Energy Rating 5-star logo

The Nationwide House Energy Rating Scheme (NatHERS) is an Australian scheme to measure the energy efficiency of a residential dwelling. An accredited software tool assesses the home based on a variety of criteria and produces an energy star rating.

== Background and history ==
The Five Star Design Rating (FSDR) was an award developed in the 1980s for "high efficiency through excellence in design and construction" which assisted builders in marketing energy efficient home designs. The certification was developed by the Glass, Mass and Insulation Council of Australia (GMI Council) together with CSIRO Division of Building Research. The GMI Council was funded by Federal and state governments (New South Wales, South Australia, Tasmania, and Victoria) and by private investors.

Under FSDR, the basic elements of glass, mass and insulation were the basis of the design principles of a five-star home. The building industry did not widely accept the system due to its simple pass/fail rating and its restrictive guidelines.

In the 1990s, individual states developed their own schemes. The Victorian scheme, based on a computer program, was eventually accepted as the most effective. However, it worked poorly in warm humid climates such as found in Queensland. The development of a nationwide House Energy Rating Scheme (NatHERS) began in 1993, based on the Victorian scheme, using the CHEETAH / CHEENATH engine developed at CSIRO. Software products NatHERS, FirstRate and Quick Rate, BERS, Q Rate and ACTHERS are based on this engine. NatHERS and BERS run the engine directly, while others use correlations based on the engine.

The NatHERS scheme was introduced in 1993. The Australian Building Codes Board introduced energy efficiency measures for houses into the Building Code of Australia (BCA) on 1 January 2003.

It has been adopted by all Australian states and territories which did not already have an equivalent system in place. During 2006, requirements for 5-star energy ratings were introduced for new homes through the BCA in Western Australia and the Australian Capital Territory. As of 2010, Queensland had adopted 6-star requirements for new homes. Victoria and South Australia have gone beyond the standard, and mandated, instead of 4 stars, a 5-star rating (enacted July 2004) – all new homes and apartments built in Victoria must since 2010 comply with the 6-star standard.

== Description ==
The house energy rating is the index of a building's thermal performance (i.e. heating and cooling requirements to keep the home comfortable) for residential homes. As of 2022, house plans and building specifications, which outline the structure, design and materials, are used as input data. A NatHERS-accredited software tool estimates how much heat is required to be added or removed to keep the building thermally comfortable, and generates a star rating out of 10, along with a certificate.

By 2020-2021, approximately 90 per cent of building approvals were assessed using the scheme, in order to show compliance with the National Construction Code. Detached homes in most parts of Australia require a 6-star rating or above. Future plans include offering energy assessments for Whole of Home (including energy performance of common household appliances), and In Home energy assessments for existing homes.

== Governance ==
NatHERS is administered by the Department of Climate Change, Energy, the Environment and Water on behalf of the states and territories.

== Ratings ==
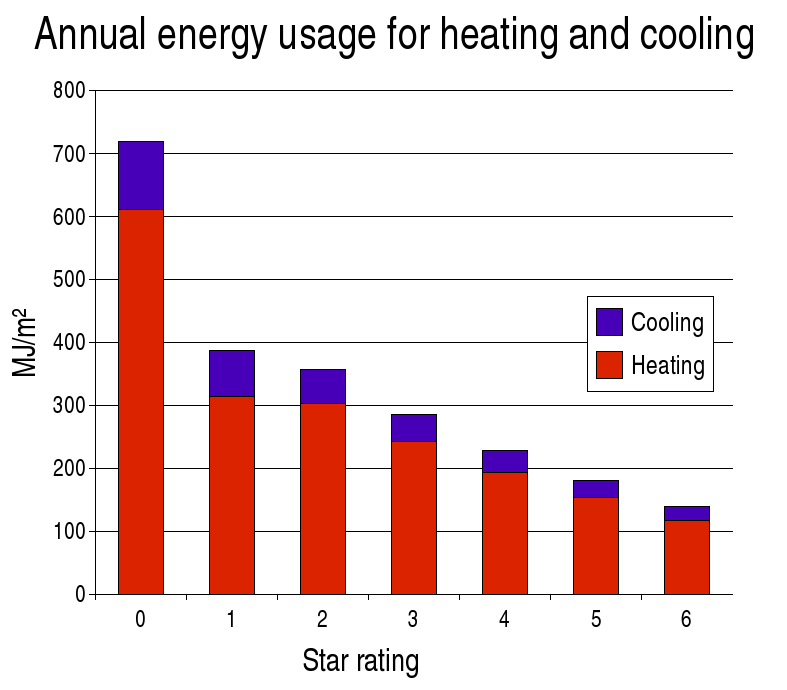
Annual energy usage (MJ/m^{2}) for heating and cooling in the ACT, by star rating. See image page for details.

=== 6-Star rating ===
A 6-Star rating indicates that a building achieves a higher level of thermal energy performance than, say a 5 star rating. As of November 2011, 6-star equivalence is the current minimum requirement in most of Australia.

=== 5-Star rating ===
A 5-Star rating indicates that a building achieves a high level of thermal energy performance, and will require minimum levels of heating and cooling to be comfortable in winter and summer. Houses which achieve a 5 star rating, compared to the average 2 star home, should be more comfortable to live in, have lower energy bills, and costs to install heating and cooling equipment should also be lower.

Energy assessments take into account different climatic conditions in different parts of the country and are benchmarked according to average household energy consumption particular to a given climatic region.

The house energy rating does not currently include the efficiency of any appliances fitted or used within the house. There are also no physical testing requirements, so air tightness testing is not required as it is with the regulations in the UK.

=== State government initiatives ===
- ACT House Energy Rating Scheme (ACTHERS), requires new or previously lived in residential homes to have an Energy Efficiency Rating (EER) Statement, prepared by an accredited ACTHERS assessor, if they are to be sold. As of the February 2006, the required software used in assessment is FirstRate, Version 3.1 or Version 4.
- In Victoria all new homes built since 2005 are required to achieve a 5 Star rating. Rating can be performed using any software approved by NatHERS.
- In South Australia, all new homes (and alterations to existing homes) are required to achieve a 7 star rating. This requirement was introduced on 1 October 2024.
- Western Australia: in 2007 the WA Government introduced further energy and water usage regulatory requirements. 5 Star Plus consists of two codes: the Energy Use in Houses Code, which requires a minimum standard of energy performance for a hot water system; and the Water Use in Houses Code, which includes provisions for alternative water supplies, efficient fixtures and fittings, and grey water diversion.
- In Queensland it is proposed that from either 1 January 2009, or when the Building Code of Australia 2009 update is released in May 2009, that all new homes built in Queensland will be required to achieve a 5 star energy equivalent rating. Currently the minimum requirement is 3.5 stars.

== See also ==
- Green Star (Australia)
- BASIX (NSW)
- EnerGuide – Canadian Regulatory Mark for energy efficiency (Canada)
- National Home Energy Rating – United Kingdom measurement of a home's energy efficiency (UK)
- Home energy rating (United States)
- Energy conservation
- Environmental economics
- Green building
- Zero-energy building
- Low-energy house
- Passive house
