= Home Information Pack =

Set of documents about a residential property for sale in England and Wales

Under Part 5 of the Housing Act 2004 a Home Information Pack (HIP, on lowercase letters: hip), sometimes called a Seller's Pack, was to be provided before a residential property in England and Wales could be put on the open market for sale with vacant possession. The pack was a set of documents about the property: an Energy Performance Certificate, local authority searches, title documents, guarantees, etc. The introduction of HIPs was subject to delays and reduced requirements, but they became mandatory for homes with four or more bedrooms on 1 August 2007 and were extended to three-bedroomed properties from 10 September 2007.

The Government had suggested that Home Information Packs would lead to a reduction in the number of abortive sales as their justification for introducing the scheme, reducing gazumping and gazundering. They were introduced despite very strong opposition from some factions in the building industry (although very many were in favour of them) and estate agents, as well as some Chartered Surveyors. There were claims that the packs contributed to the 2007–2009 housing crisis by deterring vendors from marketing their houses due to the extra costs involved in the survey.

The requirement for a Home Information Pack for property sales was suspended with effect from 21 May 2010 by the incoming Cameron–Clegg coalition government, although the requirement for a stand-alone Energy Performance Certificate remained in place. The primary legislation underpinning HIPs was subsequently repealed in 2012.

There is separate legislation for Scotland that requires anyone selling a property to provide a Home Report.

== History ==
As the idea of the Home Information Pack developed over time, so did the reasons for its introduction. A proposal to address the problem of gazumping was first made in the 1997 Labour Party manifesto. Research after the election revealed that around 28% of sales fell before exchange of contracts, with gazumping occurring in less than 2% of sales. The emphasis subsequently moved to the benefits of increased speed, transparency and consumer friendliness. The idea was based on similar practice used in Denmark.

Home Information Packs were announced in the Queen's Speech in November 2003.

In March 2006 the government gave the go-ahead for multiple certification schemes. By this stage a number of organisations had expressed an interest in running certification schemes and over 3,000 people were already going through training for the home inspector qualification. In June 2006 draft regulations were made setting out the detailed contents of Home Information Packs, rules governing the availability of packs, exceptions from the pack duties and arrangements for enforcement.

In September 2006 the government approved the first Certification Schemes to oversee the work of Home Inspectors. The schemes were set up and run by industry; Government set the standards that the schemes operated. In September the Home Condition Report Register contract was agreed. A fully operational register was scheduled to follow as soon as possible afterwards.

In June 2007 the government announced they would fund or subsidise 5000 HIPs by £100 prior to the official launch date of 1 August 2007.

Originally the HIP was going to be required from 1 June 2007. However, just ten days before that date, Communities Secretary Ruth Kelly announced that they would be phased in from August 2007, and initially only for larger properties. Between 1 August and 10 September only homes marketed with four or more bedrooms were legally required to have an HIP. This was extended to cover homes with three or more bedrooms from 10 September.

On 22 November 2007 Housing Minister Yvette Cooper announced that HIPs would be rolled out to include one and two bedroom properties as of 14 December completing the Government's phased introduction of Home Information Packs to residential homes marketed for sale within England and Wales.

First Day Marketing (FDM) was the mandatory requirement to make available all of the documents required within a HIP on the first day a home was marketed to the public. Initially, the date was set for the requirement to commence on 31 December 2007 but was delayed until 1 June 2008 to allow a period of transition. A home was able to be marketed during that time providing a commitment to pay for a HIP - including the EPC - was made and the necessary documents had a reasonable expectation of being made available within 28 days. However on 8 May 2008, the housing minister announced a further delay to first day marketing, until 31 December 2008.

Between 6 April 2009 and 20 May 2010, every property required a Home Information Pack before it could be marketed. The requirement for the full HIP was removed on 21 May 2010, only the Energy Performance Certificate requirement remained.

== Contents ==
The pack had to contain the following, which should have been no more than three months old when the property was first marketed:

- Index
- Energy Performance Certificate
- Sale Statement
- Property Information Questionnaire
- Title documents for the property
- Local Authority and drainage searches

If the property was leasehold or commonhold, then the pack also had to include the following:

- Copy of the lease
- Building insurance policy
- Contact details for the landlord or management and any legal details
- Regulations that apply
- Recent service charge receipts and accounts

For a transitional period sellers were able to market their homes without the searches or leasehold documents as long as the pack contained evidence that they had been commissioned and would be included as soon as practicable but certainly within 28 days. However the Government announced in December 2008 that with effect from 6 April 2009 this concession was to be withdrawn, and the HIPS pack would have to be completely available on the day that the property was first offered for sale.

The pack could also contain some or all of these authorised documents:

- Home Condition Report
- Two sellers questionnaire forms called Home Use Form and Home Contents Form
- Legal summary
- Other searches such as a mining search

=== Home Condition Report ===
A property inspector's primary task was to inspect a property to ensure that there are no structural flaws in the property. The inspector's task needed to be only on the surface level and he could not make an intrusive check on the property.

That is unless the inspector or his team found something that was just too extraordinary to ignore. A home inspection was done using a large number of tools and special equipment to conduct the analysis. The main agenda of the inspection was to check for vulnerable areas in the home that could be a hazard risk. Does the home have any structural flaws? Is the property built with sub-standard materials? These were the kind of questions that needed to be answered by the home inspector. 14

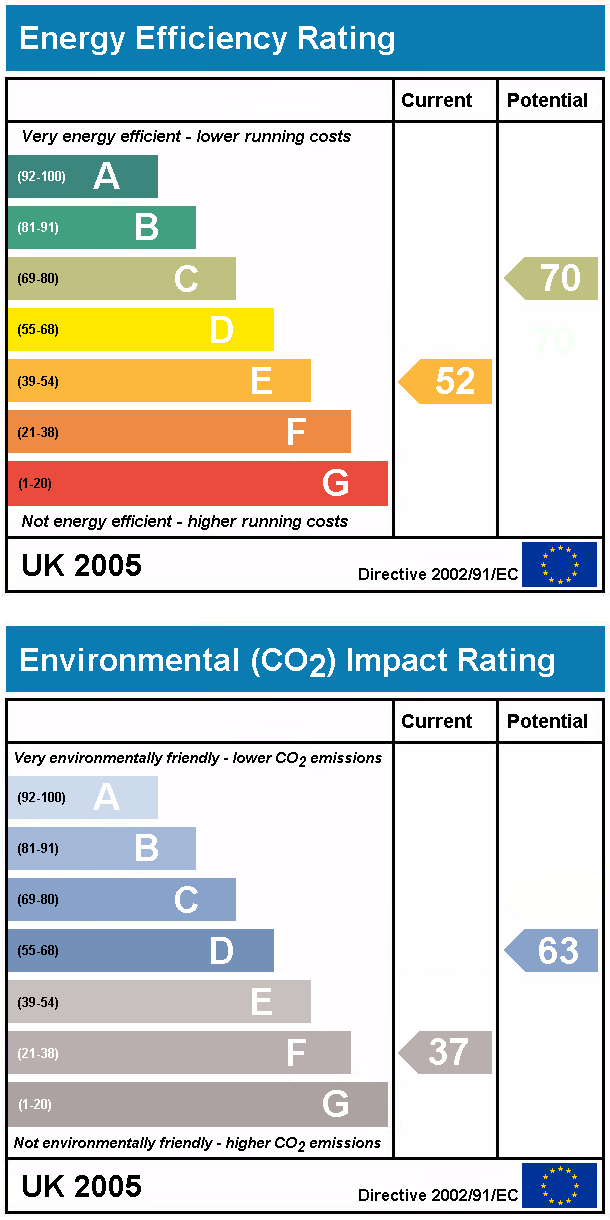
Home energy performance rating charts

=== Energy Performance Certificate ===
Similar to EU appliance efficiency ratings, the energy performance ratings on the Energy Performance Certificate provide prospective purchasers with an assessment of the property's energy consumption, together with a list of practical measures that can be taken to cut their fuel bills and carbon emissions.

An Energy Performance Certificate (EPC) in the UK needs to be completed by a government qualified Domestic Energy Assessor (DEA). DEAs offer advice on how to improve the energy performance of the dwelling which might save money. However, in practice, such documents only give general advice of little value to potential purchasers. They frequently exhibit errors since the survey is superficial and non-intrusive. They neglect older and listed buildings where planning consent is needed for structural changes to the property, such as installing double glazed windows for example.

The Energy Saving Trust hoped that by following the proposals in the energy performance certificate, the average home owner might save £300 a year on fuel bills. Government also hoped that the information could be used to support the growth of green mortgages and other incentives.

This part of the Home Information Pack was required in order to meet the requirements of the European Energy Performance of Buildings Directive.

However, the EPC met with fierce opposition by the Royal Institution of Chartered Surveyors, which in May 2007 began court action against the Government to force a Judicial Review of the implementation, demanding it look again at the lifespan of an EPC in a HIP. The move prompted internal protest within RICS after a number of members petitioned the organisation to withdraw its legal action on the basis it had failed to consult members first.

== Cost ==
Initially the cost of a Home Information Pack, including the Home Condition Report, was estimated to be around £600 by the Government. This was to include the cost of the postponed Home Condition Report, which was expected by the Department for Communities and Local Government to cost between £250 and £1,000. Industry subsequently expected the Home Information Pack (excluding the HCR) to cost between £300 - £600 for the vast majority of properties in England and Wales. Naturally, for larger or more complex properties, the costs could be significantly higher. Some estate agents were offering HIPs for free.

The Government pointed out, however, that most of the items in the pack already had to be provided during the sale process, so this was not all an additional cost.

== Enforcement ==
Failure to provide a Home Information Pack, or supplying an incomplete pack carried a fine of £200 per day the property was marketed.

Enforcement was to be carried out by local authority Trading Standards Departments; however they claimed that this was inappropriate as they normally regulate businesses, and that it would cost them too much to enforce through the civil courts.

On 31 July 2007 the Office of Fair Trading advised estate agents on their obligations. From 1 August 2007 failure by an estate agents in England and Wales to comply with the new Home Information Packs regulations could result in a ban from estate agency work.

== Reception ==
On 15 May 2007 the Royal Institution of Chartered Surveyors (RICS) started Judicial Review proceedings against the Department for Communities and Local Government for what they regarded as the department's failure to carry out a full consultation on HIPs.

Despite the above objections to the HIPs scheme, RICS were already providing courses on Home Inspection and Domestic Energy Assessment, as well as courseware manuals for the professions of Home Inspector & Domestic Energy Assessor.

There were fears that the up-front cost involved may put off some people from putting their house on the market, which may in turn depress the housing market.

The property industry had been largely against these changes. but the government said the new system would leave all homeowners better off.

The National Association of Estate Agents held the view that the legislation was unnecessary, did not cover the important reasons why home sales and purchase transactions fall through, and that the cost was too high.

Britain's largest independent estate agency, Spicerhaart, initially called for a boycott of the home information packs scheme, although then revised this position to one of full support.

In contrast, the introduction of HIPs was originally supported by Which?, who believe that they could reduce the number of failed transactions resulting from problems that can be identified at an early stage. The organisation subsequently withdrew its support following the Government's decision to postpone the introduction of Home Condition Reports.

The Conservative Party, when in Opposition, stated that they planned to scrap the legislation, calling it 'expensive and deficient red tape'. Indeed, Conservative opposition to HIPs was instrumental in a defeat in the House of Lords, where peers voted by 186 to 160 in favour of abandoning the packs. This brought them in conflict with the Association of Home Information Pack Providers.

== Suspension and abolition ==
On 12 May 2010 the incoming Conservative–Liberal Democrat coalition government announced an intention to scrap Home Information Packs. The requirement for property sellers to provide HIPs was suspended on 20 May, effective the following day. The Localism Act 2011 formally repealed the Home Information Pack legislation on 15 January 2012.

== Equivalent in Scotland ==
Under Part 3 of the Housing (Scotland) Act 2006, a person who is responsible for marketing a house must provide a Home Report to any prospective purchasers. To do this the seller will need to commission a Chartered Surveyor (or approved provider) to carry out the Single Survey and Energy Report. The seller must also complete a Property Questionnaire.

== See also ==
- Conveyancing
- British residential property market
- Domestic energy assessor
