= Building Energy Rating =

Type of rating for buildings in Ireland

A Building Energy Rating (BER) is an energy performance certificate used in Ireland when selling and constructing buildings.

== Description ==
The Building Energy Rating label is an energy label rating. The label has a scale of A-G, with A-rated buildings the most energy efficient and G the least. In relation to dwellings, the Sustainable Energy Authority of Ireland states that a "BER is an indication of the energy performance of a home. It covers energy use for space heating, water heating, ventilation and lighting calculated on the basis of standard occupancy." The label is similar to the energy rating label for a household electrical appliances (examples of which include the U.S. EnergyGuide, the European Union energy label, and the Australia/New Zealand energy rating label).

== Use ==
A BER assessment and certificate may be compulsory to sell a building or shortly after its construction. Methods of calculations and legislations related to BER may be different from one country to another. BER was created as a tool to help monitoring and improving the overall building energy efficiency.

=== BER in Ireland ===
The Statutory Instrument regulating the requirements for BER is "S.I. 666 of 2006". It is Ireland's implementation of the directive on the energy performance of buildings.

In Ireland, each new dwelling built from January 1, 2007, required a BER, unless planning application was lodged prior to December 31, 2006. From January 1, 2009, it became illegal to offer a dwelling for sale without BER. From July 1, 2008, a BER is necessary for new non-residential buildings where planning permission is required. From January 1, 2009, a BER is required for existing non-residential buildings, when offered for sale or to let. From 1 January 2019, a minimum BER of A2 has been required for all new residential buildings.
