= The Rediscovery Centre =

Irish circular economy demonstration hub

- Logo of the Rediscovery Centre

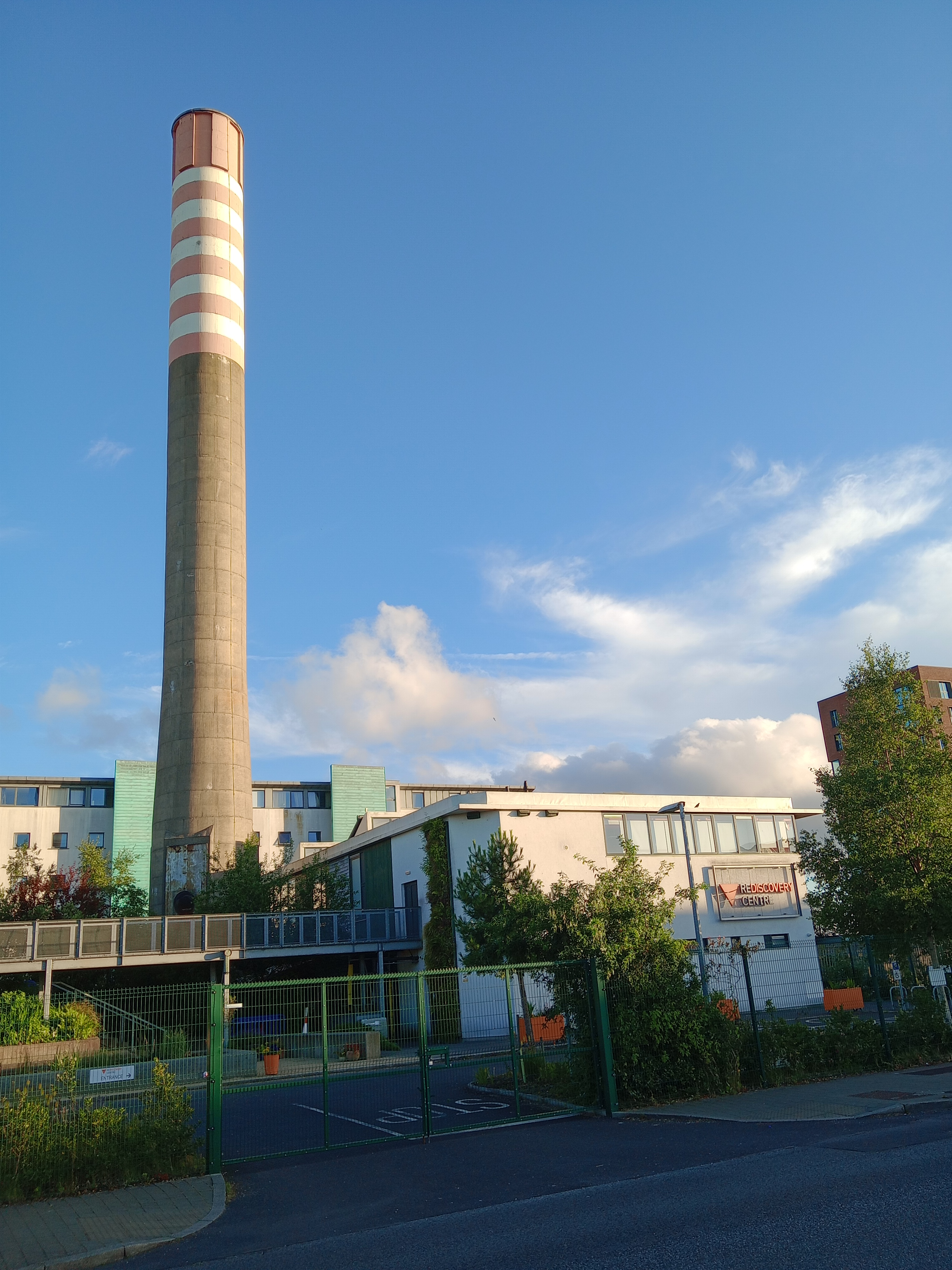

General information
- Location: The Boiler House, Ballymun Road, Dublin 9 D09 HK58, Ireland
- Year built: 2016
- Construction started: January 2016
- Completed: December 2016
- Cost: €2.5 million
- Client: Dublin City Council, Rediscovery Centre

Technical details
- Floor area: 880 sqm

Design and construction
- Architecture firm: ABK Architects
- Structural engineer: Punch Consulting Engineers
- Civil engineer: Punch Consulting Engineers
- Main contractor: Purcell Construction

Website
- rediscoverycentre.ie

The Rediscovery Centre, or the National Centre for the Circular Economy, is a resource centre focusing on the circular economy in Ballymun, Dublin, Ireland. It has been described by Dún Laoghaire–Rathdown County Council as "Europe's first circular economy demonstration hub". It is a creative movement that focuses on ideas and resources that support greener low-carbon living and works to educate and advocate for a more circular economy. The project is based out of the Boiler House, a large former boiler house in Ballymun.

It is supported by the Government of Ireland, the Regional Waste Management Planning Offices, Dublin City Council, the Irish Environmental Network and Research Ireland.

== Projects ==
The Rediscovery Centre remixes water-based paint collected from recycling centres, and refurbishes donated and abandoned bikes and resells them at lower prices. People can come to the "Repair Cafe" and get help refurbishing their furniture.

It also hosts and facilitates workshops on several topics, ranging from hand stitching to clothing repair to furniture revamping.

In 2025, Fingal County Council announced they would be launching "Second Spin" - an initiative ran in conjunction with The Rediscovery Centre to provide free upcycled bikes to teenagers who had theirs stolen. Participants can re-donate their bike if they are able to purchase a new one. A month later, Dún Laoghaire–Rathdown County Council signed a memorandum of understanding with the Rediscovery Centre as part of Dún Laoghaire–Rathdown County Council's Climate Action Plan 2024–2029. As part of the partnership, they will work together to set up a "local hub" in Dún Laoghaire–Rathdown to support sustainable living.

Additionally, it reportedly "spearheaded" the Circular.ie national project, Ireland's national platform for circular economy communications.

== Building ==
The Boiler House before the Rediscovery Centre moved in

The Rediscovery Centre is based in The Boiler House, a large former boiler house in Ballymun that originally provided heat to the Ballymun Flats. The building was previously known as "the eighth tower". The building was set to be demolished in 2012 until the Rediscovery Centre showed interest in the building. The day before they visited it, the building received an A2 building energy rating when they were expecting a B rating. The conversion cost €2.5 million and took 12 months. The main contractor was Purcell Architects.

== History ==
The original concept for the centre was developed by Swedish architect Eric Forsmark in 2004. Following this, Howley Harrington Architects carried out a survey to gauge how feasible the idea was.

The centre began as a series of environmental social enterprises at Ballymun Regeneration Project. People were trained to remix paint, refurbish bicycles and furniture and upcycle clothes into ecofashion. All of these projects have now been moved to the Rediscovery Centre building.

In April 2008, The Rediscovery Centre announced a fully recycled fashion collection they'd commissioned from designers Choi Cheung, Eva Maguire and Carrie Ann Moran called "Rediscover Fashion" at Trinity College Dublin. The collection was fully launched on May 2nd as part of Ballymun Regeneration Limited's 'Greener Ballymun' conference. A few days later in May, the Rediscovery Centre was accredited as a Discover Science Centre as part of Research Ireland's Discover Primary Science initiative.
