= ResNet (disambiguation) =

ResNet most prominently refers to residual neural network, a type of artificial neural network characterized by introducing additional connections that skip multiple layers in the network.

It may also refer to:

- Residential network, a computer network provided by a university to serve residence halls
- Residual flow network, in graph theory
- Residential Energy Services Network (RESNET), an organization responsible for home energy ratings
