= CELC =

CELC may refer to:

== Churches ==
- Confessional Evangelical Lutheran Conference
- Ceylon Evangelical Lutheran Church
- Christ Evangelical Lutheran Church, a Lutheran Church in Andhra Pradesh
- Communauté des Église Libres au Congo ('Free Churches Community in Congo'), of the Church of Christ in the Congo

== Other uses ==
- Čelc Hill, Horjul, Horjul, Slovenia
- Canadian Engineering Leadership Conference, of the Canadian Federation of Engineering Students
- Centre for English Language Communication, National University of Singapore
- Charlottesville Early Learning Center, Charlottesville City Public Schools, Virginia, United States
- China Energy Label Centre
- Coleção Entomológica Coleopterológica ('Coleoptera Entomological Collection'), Federal University of Viçosa, Minas Gerais, Brazil
- Conféderation Européenne du Lin et du Chanvre, for Belgian Linen
