= Proficiency =

Proficiency may refer to:

- Language proficiency, the ability of an individual to speak or perform in an acquired language
- Expertise
- Skill, the learned capacity to carry out predetermined results often with the minimum outlay of time, energy, or both
- Ability, the state of excelling in a specific situation or skill; being above standard
- Uncertainty coefficient, an information-theoretic measure of nominal association

== See also ==
- Efficiency (disambiguation)
- Progress (disambiguation)
- Profit (disambiguation)
- Test (disambiguation)
