= China Energy Label =

Energy consumption labelling scheme

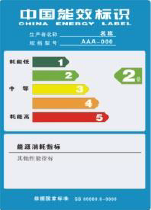
A mock-up of a China Energy Label from 2011.

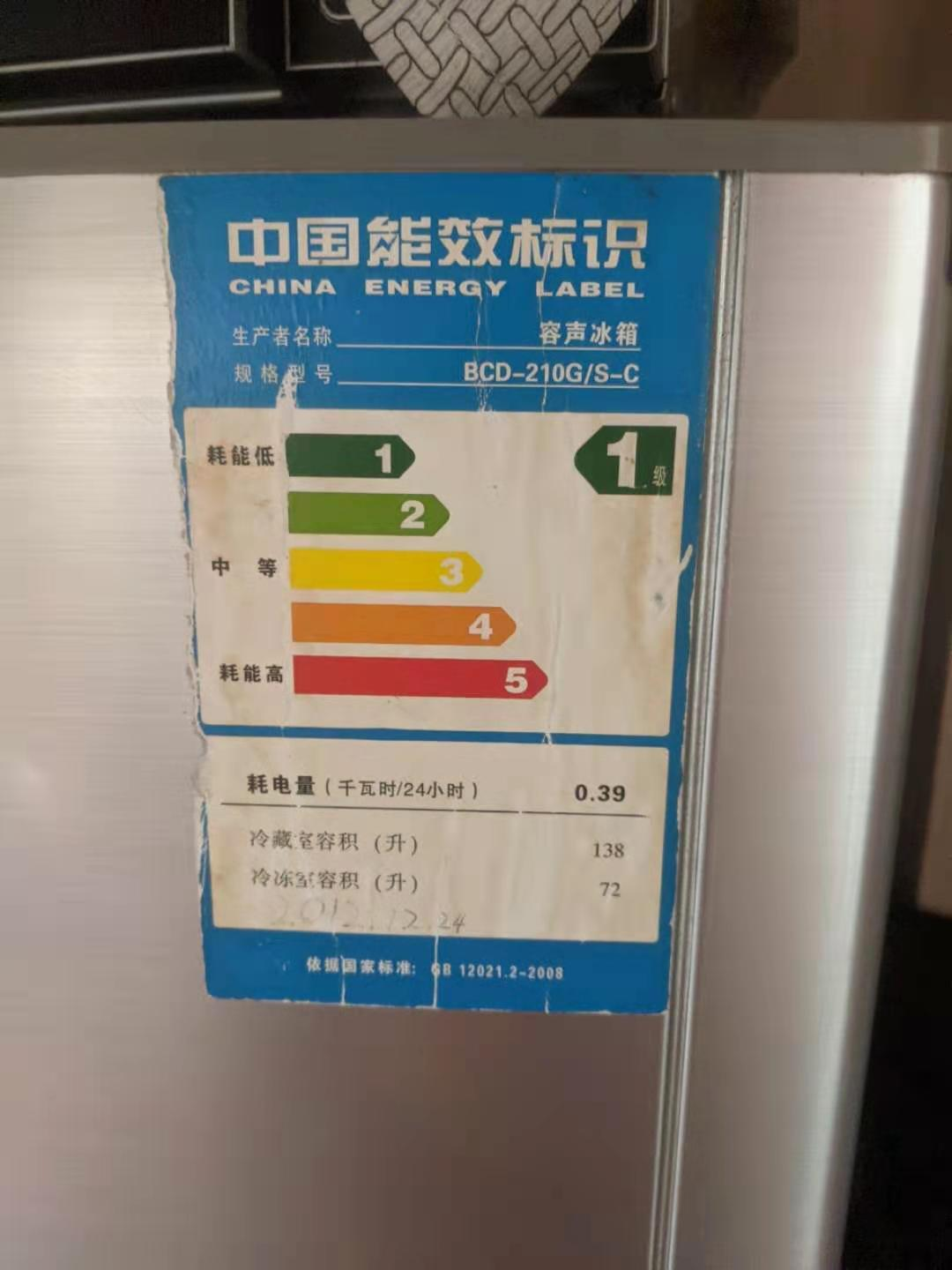
A photo of a China Energy Label on a refrigerator.

The China Energy Label (CEL; Chinese: 中国能效标识; pinyin: zhōngguó néngxiào biāozhì) is an energy consumption label for products in China, similar to the European Union energy label. Manufacturers of specified electronic devices are obligated to attach a CEL label to their goods to inform China-based consumers of the product's energy efficiency. The label includes the product's energy efficiency class (1–5) as well as information regarding its energy consumption.

== Targets ==
The CEL shows the level of energy consumption and, thus, the energy efficiency of a product. The CEL aims to encourage customers to buy energy efficient products. The target to increase energy efficiency and the acceptance of Chinese consumers towards energy efficient products is highly important, since China is the world's largest energy consumer.

== Responsible authority ==
Applications are to be filed at the China Energy Label Center (CELC), which is the main authority for CEL-classification.

== Products requiring CEL ==
Since the introduction of China Energy Label in 2005, more than 25 product groups have become CEL-mandatory, while additional classes are continually being added to the product catalogue. For every product that requires CEL, a GB standards has been implemented. Among the CEL mandatory products are:

- Motors
- Gas kettles
- Photocopiers
- Water kettles
- Refrigerators
- Air compressors
- Air conditioners
- Washing machines
- Flat-screen televisions
- Fluorescent tube

== See also ==
- EnergyGuide, the energy rating label in the United States
- Energy rating label, the energy rating label in the Australia and New Zealand
- European Union energy label, the energy rating label in the European Economic Area
