= WELS rating =

Australian water conservation program

The Water Efficiency Labelling and Standard (WELS) scheme is an Australian Government urban water conservation program. Its aim is to reduce demand for drinking water by informing consumers about water efficiency at the point of sale.

== Products covered ==
The WELS scheme sets the water efficiency for the following products sold in Australia:

- Taps and showers
- Toilets and urinals
- Dishwashers and washing machines
- Flow controllers

These products must be registered for the Australian market and labelled with their water efficiency information when they are offered for sale.

== The WELS label ==
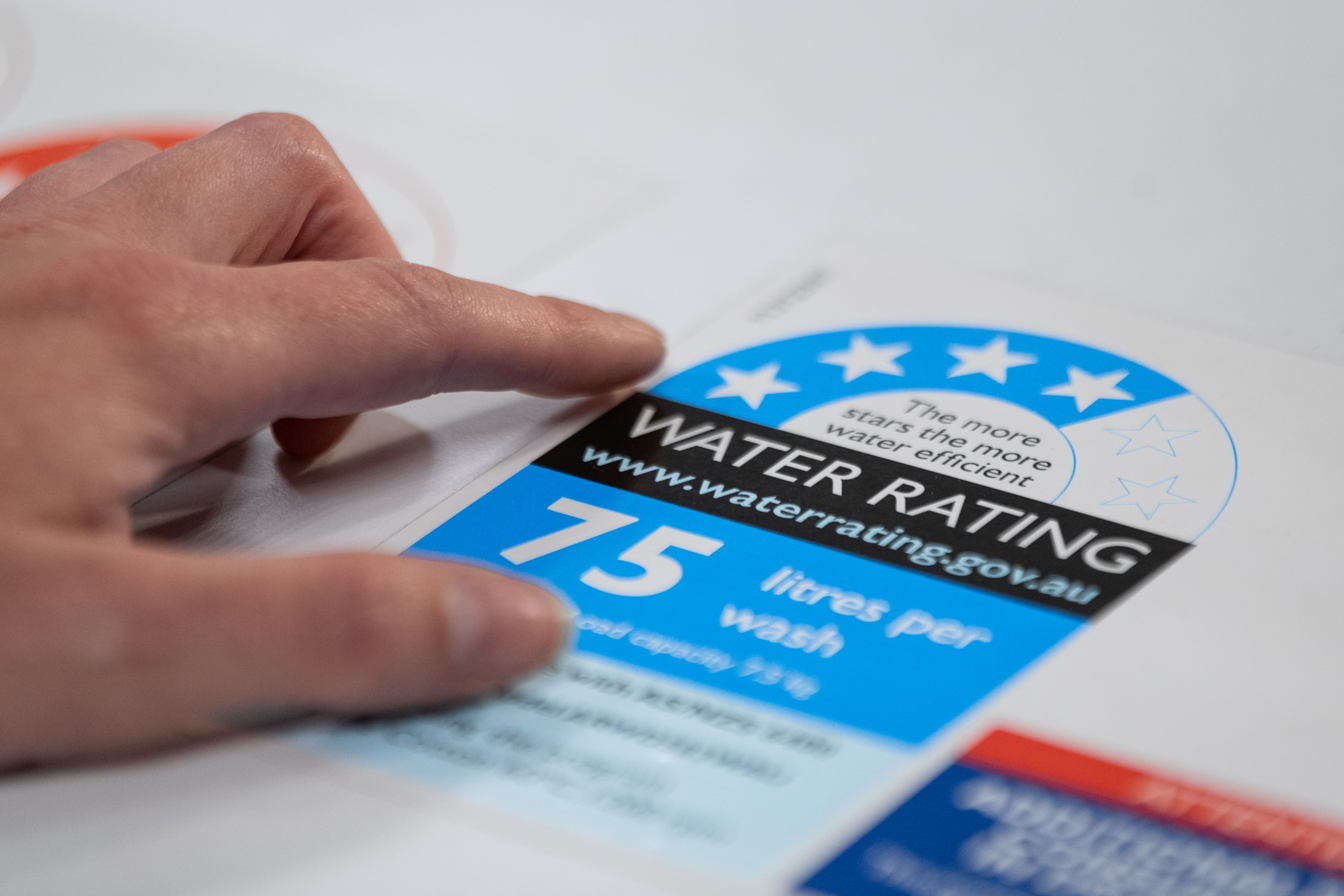
The WELS water rating label

There are three parts to the label:

1. The star rating at the top shows the water efficiency of the product. The more stars, the more water efficient.
2. The water consumption rate in the middle shows the amount of water used.
3. The company name and the WELS license number are at the bottom. This company is responsible for registering the product.

== See also ==
- Water efficiency
- Energy rating label
