= Energy efficiency =

Energy efficiency may refer to:

- Energy efficiency (physics), the ratio between the useful output and input of an energy conversion process
  - Electrical efficiency, useful power output per electrical power consumed
  - Mechanical efficiency, a ratio of the measured performance to the performance of an ideal machine
  - Thermal efficiency, the extent to which the energy added by heat is converted to net work output or vice versa
  - Luminous efficiency, a measure of how well a light source produces visible light
  - Fuel efficiency, the efficiency of converting potential energy in a fuel into kinetic energy
  - Energy efficiency in transportation, the fuel economy of various modes of transportation
  - Energy-efficient landscaping, a type of landscaping designed for the purpose of conserving energy
- Efficient energy use, minimizing the amount of energy used for a given, constant energy service
- Energy conservation, reducing energy consumption by using less of an energy service

== See also ==
- Energy (disambiguation)
- Efficiency (disambiguation)
- Energy rating (disambiguation)
