= Domestic energy assessor =

Person accredited in the United Kingdom to produce energy performance certificates

A Domestic Energy Assessor (DEA) for efficient energy use is an accredited position in the UK that is approved by the Ministry for Housing, Communities and Local Government (MHCLG). Under the UK's Energy Performance of Buildings Regulations, an Energy Performance Certificate is required for the sale or rent of a domestic dwelling. DEAs are qualified and accredited for the production of RdSAP EPCs - these are specifically for use on existing buildings, which would include a dwelling built after 2008 which had already received an on-construction SAP EPC. As of November 2018, DEAs had produced 16,849,375 RdSAP EPCs since the inception of the industry.

== Qualifications ==
"If you’re a DEA you must:

- carry out energy efficiency assessments on existing dwellings only
- collect data on the dimensions, construction, heating and hot water provision of the property and enter it into an approved software programme - Reduced Data Standard Assessment Procedure (RDSAP)
- produce energy performance certificates (EPCs) for homes being marketed for sale, for other homes sold and for homes when rented."

== Importance of the role ==
Domestic energy assessors will be commissioned by householders or their agents to visit homes, initially those that are about to come onto the market. The owners will be obliged to make EPCs and advisory reports available to buyers, and later to tenants. In this way, DEAs will be a key part of helping homebuyers, homeowners and tenants contribute to the “green agenda”. Research confirms that householders want to know about the energy efficiency of their homes, and about how they can make improvements.

== Skills and knowledge ==
These are defined in the National Occupational Standards (NOS). The NOS are a specification of both the technical knowledge and the skills required to be a competent DEA They include a requirement to understand the legal background to the role, to possess relevant interpersonal skills and make accurate judgments consistently, aided by the software, on the recommendations for cost effective improvement measures. They may be downloaded free of charge from the Asset Skills Energy Assessors website.

== Training to achieve a qualification ==
DEA qualifications will be provided by three awarding bodies–the Awarding Body for the Built Environment (ABBE), City and Guilds and the National Association of Estate Agents (NAEA). Each will include a multiple choice examination and detailed assessment of not less than five EPCs. Many providers in both the public (usually Further education colleges) and private sector are offering or planning to offer training to become a DEA. Professional bodies and private providers will also do the same, whilst larger companies will almost certainly provide the learning in-house. Asset Skills, awarding bodies and professional associations can all give advice about how to locate training relevant to your needs and where you live. The amount of training you require will depend on your current level of skills and knowledge–obviously much less for an experienced practitioner than someone entering the world of Energy Assessment and buildings for the first time.

Some funding support may be available in certain circumstances–approach a local or regional Learning and Skills Council (LSC) or in Wales, the Welsh Assembly Government.

== After qualification ==
In order to practise, DEAs need to join an accreditation body. This will entail a check that the individual is fit and proper and a commitment to maintaining appropriate Professional Indemnity, updating your skills and knowledge regularly (CPD), participating in the accrediting body’s quality assurance scheme, and abiding by their advice and guidance.

== Accreditation Schemes for DEAs ==
Domestic Energy Assessors are able to join any of the following accreditation schemes to be able to practice. Multiple registrations are common within the Industry.

- ECMK
- Elmhurst Energy
- Quidos
- Sterling
- Bacra (Scottish only)

== See also ==
- Global warming
- Energy White Paper
- House energy rating
- Home energy rating
- Energy efficiency in British housing
- Energy policy of the United Kingdom
- Energy policy of the European Union
