= Utility bill audit =

A utility bill audit is a comprehensive review of an organization's utility invoices to include Electric, Gas, Water/Sewer and Waste invoices in order to track billing errors and evaluate rate plans to make suggestions for further savings. This is separate from an energy audit which seeks to minimize energy spending through increased efficiencies. The audit may be performed by an internal department or by an external contractor. Reasons for choosing a contractor include:

- Contractors that specialize can find more errors and save more
- Contractors are able to negotiate better with utility providers because they have been exposed to multiple contracts and are thus aware of the market
- The work is not sufficient to justify training and/or employing more personnel
- Contractors have established relationships with utilities and know how to document issues for quicker understanding and processing by the utilities

Very large multinational companies may benefit from an in-house auditor depending on the number of utility providers, number of accounts with providers, and total utility spend.

== See also ==
- Audit
- Audit (telecommunication)
- Energy audit
