= National Green Building Standard =

American environmental certification program

The National Green Building Standard (NGBS) is an ANSI-approved green building certification program, specifically focused on single-family and multi-family residential buildings, remodeling projects, and land developments.

In a partnership with the ASHRAE, the International Code Council (ICC), and the National Association of Home Builders (NAHB ), the NGBS was developed to provide a uniform national platform for recognizing and advancing green residential construction and development.

To date, over 100,000 residential units have been certified green with the National Green Building Standard.

== Rating System ==
The NGBS is a point-based system, wherein a single-family or multifamily building(s) can attain certification depending on the sustainable and green practices included in design and construction, and planned for its operation and maintenance. Projects can qualify for four certification levels (Bronze, Silver, Gold, or Emerald) by earning the required number of points for each level.

=== ANSI-approved consensus ===
The 2015 edition of the NGBS is the third iteration of the NGBS, building upon the previous 2012 and 2008 editions. All editions of the Standard were developed by Consensus Committees of industry and nonprofit individuals, and in partnership with the ICC and NAHB. The 2015 edition of the NGBS introduced a new partner in the development process, ASHRAE. Staff of these three organizations did not serve as members of the Consensus Committee, and aided only in the facilitation of meetings.

The NGBS remains the only residential-specific green building rating system to undergo the full consensus process and receive approval from the American National Standards Institute (ANSI). ANSI approval is critical as it serves as third-party confirmation of balance, representation, openness, consensus, and due process in the development process. The Consensus Committee that developed the 2015 version of the Standard was composed of 42 individuals representing a variety of government agencies, municipalities, home building industry stakeholders, and non-profit organizations, including but not limited to:

- National Multifamily Housing Council
- National Institute of Standards & Technology
- Northeast Energy Efficiency Partnerships
- Texas A&M University
- U.S. Department of Energy (DOE)
- U.S. Department of Housing & Urban Development (HUD)
- American Institute of Architects (AIA)
- City of Des Moines

=== Green practice categories ===
Points are earned when a project complies with the numerous green building practices laid out within the Standard. These practices fall into six general categories:

- lot design, preparation, and development
- resource efficiency
- energy efficiency
- water efficiency
- indoor environmental quality
- operation, maintenance, and building owner education

=== Certification levels ===
Projects can qualify for four levels of certification by earning the required total number of points for each level:

- Bronze: 231 Points
- Silver: 334 Points
- Gold: 489 Points
- Emerald: 611 Points

The NGBS was designed so that a project team must take a multifaceted approach to green building. It requires that a project achieve a minimum number of points in each green practice category to be certified, as well as earn a minimum number of additional points from any category it chooses. This prevents project teams from obtaining all of its points by focusing on a handful of categories, and ignoring other categories due to difficulty.

A building’s highest rating depends upon the lowest threshold met by any of the six categories. For example, if a project missed the threshold for Emerald in one category by a single point, it will still only achieve Gold certification even if it reached the required number of points for Emerald certification in all other categories.

Furthermore, for dwelling units greater than 4,000 square feet, the number of total points required to receive certification levels increases by one point for every additional 100 square feet. This makes it more challenging for larger dwellings to receive the same certification as smaller dwellings to account for the larger environmental impact of larger dwelling spaces.

== Eligible Project Types ==
=== Residential buildings ===
The NGBS was designed specifically for residential construction, development, and renovation. Eligible building types which can earn certification through the Standard include:

- single-family houses
- low-rise multifamily
- high-rise multifamily
- residential portions of mixed-use buildings
- affordable housing
- renovations of existing houses

=== Land development ===
Within the NGBS, and separate from individual buildings and renovations, a development can receive a certification for design and preparation in accordance with green practices. Similar to buildings, lane development projects can qualify for four different rating levels:

- 1-Star: 95 points
- 2-Star: 122 points
- 3-Star: 149 points
- 4-Star: 175 points

For land development projects, points are not divided among separate categories, but are a total collection of varying practices, such as stormwater management, natural resource conservation, and planning.

== Certification Process ==
Conformance with the NGBS is verified through construction documents, plans, specifications, inspection reports, and other data that demonstrates conformance with the points being pursued. All NGBS project teams must include a NGBS Green Verifier, who serves as an independent, in-field representatives of the NGBS Green certification system. Verifiers work with project teams to perform the rough and final construction inspections described below. To achieve certification, these inspection reports, along with relevant information regarding pursued practices, are provided to Home Innovation Labs for technical review and verification.

Every project is subject to two independent and mandatory, third-party verification inspections. The accredited Verifier is responsible for the visual inspection of every green building practice in the building. The verifier must perform a rough inspection before the drywall is installed in order to observe the wall cavities in every apartment, and a final inspection of every apartment once the project is complete. The required verification imbues a high level of rigor, continuity, and quality assurance to the system and to the projects that are certified.

== Designations ==
=== Green Verifier ===
Home Innovation Labs qualifies, trains, and accredits building professionals to provide independent verification services for builders participating in our NGBS Green Certification program. Verifiers must first demonstrate they possess experience in residential construction and green building before they are eligible to take the verifier training. Most verifiers are also HERS Raters and/or LEED Accredited Professionals. Potential verifiers must complete thorough training on exactly how to verify every NGBS practice. After completing the training, verifiers must pass a written exam before receiving accreditation, and must have their accreditation renewed annually.

Home Innovation Labs regularly audit Verifiers and the verifications they perform as part of our internal quality assurance program. NGBS Green Verifier accreditation is earned by individuals, and does not extend company-wide.

=== Certified Green Professional ===
The Certified Green Professional (CGP) designation is offered by the NAHB, and recognizes builders, remodelers and other industry professionals who incorporate green and sustainable building principles into homes. The required courses provide a background in green building methods, as well as the tools to reach consumers, from the organization leading the charge to provide market-driven green building solutions to the home building industry.

CGP coursework is closely aligned with the ICC/ASHRAE 700-2015 National Green Building Standard, which includes chapters on energy, water and resource efficiency, indoor environmental quality, lot and site development and home owner education, and is the core curriculum for the required CGP classes.

There are nearly 3,000 active CGPs in the United States working in all aspects of the high-performance home building and remodeling industry.

=== Green Certified Products ===
The NGBS Green Certified Product program bridges the gap between manufacturers who produce NGBS-certified products and the builders/designers who want to use them in homes.

To be eligible for the NGBS Green Certified Products program, manufacturers must provide appropriate third-party evidence to Home Innovation Labs that their products meet the criteria for recognition in buildings seeking NGBS Green Home Certification.

NGBS Green Certified Products earn a certificate that identifies the specific NGBS section(s) where points for the product are available. This information facilitates designers' selection of products to be used in green homes, and the approval of those points by Home Innovation-accredited green building verifiers.

== Notable NGBS Buildings ==
=== Salmon Creek Net Zero ===
The Salmon Creek Net Zero Home is a single-family house built in Vancouver, Washington. It earned an NGBS certification at the Emerald level, the highest available certification level.

The home was built by Urban NW Homes in a neighborhood featuring only Emerald level homes, the first of its kind on the West Coast. Notable features of this home that helped it earn certification included:

- staggered stud construction for reduced material consumption
- triple-pane windows for increased energy efficiency and less heat loss
- cork entry flooring, a highly renewable resource
- refurbished interior doors, for reduced resource consumption
- washing machine that waters the yard, allowing for reduced water consumption
- lifebreath air purifier, for great indoor air quality

=== Norcross Remodel ===
The Norcross Remodel project is a single-family home remodel located in Dallas, Texas. It earned an NGBS certification at the Bronze level.

According to the owners, as their family grew, they needed more space. Ferrier Builders completed the addition onto their existing home, with sustainable and high-performance features, including:

- new high-efficiency windows and doors
- spray foam insulation in the walls & roof
- ENERGY STAR kitchen and laundry appliances
- solar tubes to aid with natural daylighting

=== Roxton ===
This is multifamily mixed-income remodeling project located in Denton, Texas. It earned an NGBS certification at the Emerald level, the highest available certification level.

This urban, low-rise multifamily apartment complex consists of 16 buildings containing 126 residential units. The project was a gut remodel of a 1970s building, and green building practices helped lead to an estimated 63% savings in water compared to the original building.
