= Tyre label =

Mark for motor vehicle tyres

EU tyre label

The tyre label is a mark for motor vehicle tyres. Manufacturers of tyres for cars, light and heavy trucks must specify fuel consumption, wet grip and noise classification of every tyre sold in EU market starting in November 2012.

For passenger car, light truck and truck tyres the information must be available in technical promotional literature (leaflets, brochures, etc.), including the manufacturer website. For passenger and light truck tyres, the manufacturers or importers have the choice of either putting a sticker on the tyre tread or a label accompanying each delivery of batch of tyres to the dealer and to the end consumer. The tyre label will use a classification from the best (green category "A") to the worst performance (red category "G").

This initiative results from a regulation by the EU Commission released in 2009. It is part of the Energy Efficiency Action Plan, designed to improve the energy performance of products, buildings and services to reduce energy consumption by 20% until 2020. The EU has already created a system for marking of electrical household appliances such as refrigerators, washing machines and televisions with the intent to better inform the European population about the level of their consumption.

== Rolling resistance ==
Rolling resistance is the main key factor in measuring the energy efficiency of a tyre and has direct influence on the fuel consumption of a vehicle. A set of tyres of the green class "A" compared to a "G" class can reduce fuel consumption by 9% of a passenger car; even more for trucks.

'D' Grading is not used in rolling resistance grading for Passenger Cars and Light Trucks while it is used for Heavy Trucks

== Wet grip ==
As at January 2019, the wet grip tests for passenger car tyres (EU category C1) are specified in a 2011 amendment, Regulation No 228/2011 to the original 2009 Regulation No 1222/2009 "on the labelling of tyres with respect to fuel efficiency and other essential parameters". The wet grip index (WGI) is calculated from the results of two tests specified in the regulations. The first test measures the maximum achievable average deceleration of a vehicle as it slows from 85 ± 2 km/h (52.8 mph) to 20 ± 2 km/h (12.4 mph). The second test (the "skid trailer" test) is usually performed using a tow vehicle and trailer. The trailer is fitted with the tyres being tested and the average maximum braking force that can be applied through the tyres, under a high proportion (60 - 90%) of the tyres' maximum load, is measured as the combination travels at a constant speed of 65 ± 2 km/h.

Results of at least three runs of each test are combined to produce the wet grip index, yielding ratings of A - G (although D and G are not used for passenger cars), where A is the best.

When buying tyres, the braking distance (in the wet) from the reference speed of 85 km/h, to a standstill, varies by something of the order of 3m from one class to the next.

== Noise emission ==
The driving by noise is quoted as an absolute value in decibel and as a 3 classes sound wave symbol. A continuous sound level above 80 decibel can cause health problems.

== Tyres that must be labeled ==
=== The Tyre Label will generally apply to ===
- Car and SUV tyres
- Van tyres
- Truck tyres

=== Exceptions from labelling ===
- Tyres for cars made before 1 October 1990.
- Re-treaded tyres
- Motorcycle tyres
- Racing/sports car tyres
- Studded tyres
- Spare tyres
- Vintage car tyres
- Professional off-road tyres

== Tax on noisy tyres ==
Tyres that make too much roadway noise as determined by the EU, will have an extra tax/penalty imposed on them from November 2012.

== Reporting requirements ==
=== Tyre manufacturer ===
- For passenger car, light truck and truck tyres the information must be available in the technical promotional literature (leaflets, brochures, etc.), including the manufacturer website
- For passenger and light truck tyres, the manufacturers or importers have the choice of either putting a sticker on the tyre tread or a label accompanying each delivery of batch of tyres to the dealer and to the end consumer

=== Tyre dealer ===
- Must ensure tyres which are visible to consumers at the point of sale carry a sticker or have a label in their close proximity which is shown to the end user before the sale
- Must give the information during the purchase process when the tyres offered for sale are not visible to the end-user
- Must give the information on or with the bill

=== Car manufacturer ===
- Must declare the tyre wet grip and fuel efficiency class and external rolling noise measured value of the tyre type(s) that are offered in option, when different from those fitted normally on the basic vehicle.
- As soon as the customer is given a choice either in the size / type of tyres fitted on the basic rim or a choice of rim and tyre size, the labelling information must be provided before sale.
- There might be no obligation to provide information only in those cases where there is a choice of rim with tyres types and sizes that are strictly identical to those which are sold automatically with the new vehicle.

=== EU-Commission ===
- Detailed information about contents and design of the label.
- Each EU member state is to organise monitoring and impose penalties in cases of non-compliance.

== Critical View ==
The new label is designed to show information regarding 3 criteria, however there are many other important performance factors to consider including:

- Resistance to aquaplaning
- Driving stability
- Handling and steering precision on wet and dry roads
- Durability
- Braking performance on dry roads
- Capabilities in winter conditions

Published tyre tests take these performance factors into account and are a source of information regarding the total performance of a tyre. Tyres that make too much noise as determined by the EU, will have an extra tax/penalty imposed on them from November 2012.

== Driving Proviso ==
Actual fuel savings and road safety also depend heavily on the behaviour of drivers when using their cars, and in particular the following:

- Eco-driving can significantly reduce fuel consumption
- Tyre pressure should be regularly checked to optimise wet grip and fuel efficiency performance
- Stopping distances should always be strictly respected

== See also ==
- European Union energy label
- Ecolabel
- Tyre
- Tyre code
- Uniform Tire Quality Grading
