= European Union energy label =

Energy consumption labelling scheme

Example EU energy label for a refrigerator

EU Directive 92/75/EC (1992) established an energy consumption labelling scheme. The directive was implemented by several other directives, thus most white goods, light bulb packaging and cars must have an EU Energy Label clearly displayed when offered for sale or rent. The energy efficiency of the appliance is rated in terms of a set of energy efficiency classes from A to G on the label, A being the most energy efficient, G the least efficient. The labels also give other useful information to the customer as they choose between various models. The information should also be given in catalogues and included by internet retailers on their websites.

In an attempt to keep up with advances in energy efficiency, A+, A++, and A+++ grades were later introduced for various products; since 2010, a new type of label exists that makes use of pictograms rather than words, to allow manufacturers to use a single label for products sold in different countries.

Directive 92/75/EC was replaced by Directive 2010/30/EU, and was again replaced by Regulation 2017/1369/EU from 1 August 2017. Updated labelling requirements entered into force in 2021, the exact date depended on the relevant delegated regulation (e.g. dishwasher's labels changed on 1 March 2021).

It reintroduced a simpler classification, using only the letters from A to G. The rescaling led to better differentiation among products that, under the previous label classification, all appeared in the same top categories. It meant, for example, that a fridge that previously had an A+++ label could now be a C category, even though the fridge is just as energy efficient as before. The main principle was that the A category would be empty at first, and B and C categories scarcely populated, to pave way for new, more energy efficient products to be invented and developed.

== Major appliances ==
Pre-2021 energy label for a refrigerator

Pre-2010 energy label for a washing machine

=== Labelling ===
The energy labels are separated into at least four categories:

- The appliance's details: according to each appliance, specific details, of the model and its materials.
- Energy class: a colour code associated with a letter (from A to G) that gives an idea of the appliance's electrical consumption relative to what is available on the market
- Consumption, efficiency, capacity, etc.: this section gives information according to appliance type.
- Noise: the noise emitted by the appliance is described in decibels.

=== Refrigerating appliances ===
For refrigerating appliances, such as refrigerators, freezers, wine-storage appliances, and combined appliances, the labelling is specified in terms of an energy efficiency index EEI, which is an indication of the annual power consumption relative to a reference consumption that is based on the storage volume and the type of appliance (refrigerator or freezer).

Refrigerating appliances, as EEI (post-2023)
A	B	C	D	E	F	G
≤41	≤51	≤64	≤80	≤100	≤125	>125

The label also contains:

- the annual energy consumption in kW·h
- the capacity of fresh foods in litres for refrigerators and combined appliances
- the capacity of frozen foods in litres for freezers and combined appliances
- the noise in dB(A)

==== Pre-2021 ====
For cold appliances (and this product alone), for models that are more economical than those of category A, categories A+, A++, and A+++ were previously assigned. According to the 2010 regulations, the boundary between the A^{+} and A classes was 44 up to 1 July 2014, and 42 after that date.

Refrigerating appliances, as EEI (pre-2021)
A^{+++}	A^{++}	A^{+}	A	B	C	D	E	F	G
<22	<33	<42/44	<55	<75	<95	<110	<125	<150	>150

=== Washing machines and tumble dryers ===
Up to 2010, the energy efficiency scale for washing machines is calculated based on a cotton cycle at 60 °C (140 °F) with a maximum declared load. This load is typically 6 kg. The energy efficiency index is in kW·h per kilogram of washing, assuming a cold-water supply at 15 °C.

Washing machines (pre-2010), in kWh/kg
A	B	C	D	E	F	G
<0.19	<0.23	<0.27	<0.31	<0.35	<0.39	>0.39

The energy label also contains information on:

- total consumption per cycle
- washing performance – with a class from A to G
- spin drying performance – with a class from A to G
- maximum spin speed
- the total cotton capacity in kg
- water consumption per cycle in litres
- noise in the washing and spinning cycles dB(A)

The washing performance is measured according to European harmonised standard EN 60456 and is based on a 60 °C cycle on fabric samples with stains of oil, blood, chocolate, sebum, and red wine, using a standardised detergent and compared against a reference washing machine. The amount of stain removal is then translated into a washing performance index.

Washing performance index
A	B	C	D	E	F	G
>1.03	>1.00	>0.97	>0.94	>0.91	>0.88	<0.88

The spin-drying efficiency class is based on the remaining moisture content (RMC), which is the mass of water divided by the dry mass of cotton fabrics. It is based on a weighted average of full-load and partial-load cycles.

Spin-drying efficiency class (as remaining moisture content in % - D)
A	B	C	D	E	F	G
D<45	45≤D<54	54≤D<63	63≤D<72	72≤D<81	81≤D<90	D≥90

A new energy label, introduced in 2010, is based on the energy efficiency index (EEI), and has energy classes in the range A+++ to D. The EEI is a measure of the annual electricity consumption, and includes energy consumed during power-off and standby modes, and the energy consumed in 220 washing cycles. For the washing cycles, a weighted mix consisting of 42% full-load cycles at 60 °C, 29% partial-load cycles at 60 °C, and 29% partial-load cycles at 40 °C. The washing performance is not mentioned anymore, since all washing machines must reach class A anyway. For a 6-kg machine, an EEI of 100 is equivalent to 334 kWh per year, or 1.52 kWh per cycle.

Washing machines 2010 rating: energy efficiency index (EEI)
A^{+++}	A^{++}	A^{+}	A	B	C	D
EEI<46	46≤EEI<52	52≤EEI<59	59≤EEI<68	68≤EEI<77	77≤EEI<87	EEI≥87

Rating introduced in 2021: energy efficiency index (EEI - kWh spent on 100 wash cycles)
A	B	C	D	E	F	G
EEI≤52	52<EEI≤60	60<EEI≤69	69<EEI≤80	80<EEI≤91	91<EEI≤102	EEI>102

For tumble dryers the energy efficiency scale is calculated using the cotton drying cycle with a maximum declared load. The energy efficiency index is in kW·h per kilogram of load. Different scales apply for condenser and vented dryers.

Condenser dryers, in kWh/kg
A	B	C	D	E	F	G
<0.55	<0.64	<0.73	<0.82	<0.91	<1.00	>1.00

Vented dryers, in kWh/kg
A	B	C	D	E	F	G
<0.51	<0.59	<0.67	<0.75	<0.83	<0.91	>0.91

For condenser dryers, a weighted condensation efficiency class is calculated using the average condensation efficiency for the standard cotton cycle at both full and partial load.

Condensation efficiency class
A	B	C	D	E	F	G
<90%	<80%	<70%	<60%	<50%	<40%	>40%

The label also contains:

- the energy consumption per cycle
- the total cotton capacity
- whether the unit is vented or condensing
- cycle time corresponding to the standard cotton programme at full load in minutes
- noise in dB(A)

For combined washer dryers the energy efficiency scale is calculated using the cotton drying cycle with a maximum declared load. The energy efficiency index is in kW·h per kilogram of load. Different scales apply for condenser and vented dryers.

Combined washer dryers, in kWh/kg
A	B	C	D	E	F	G
<0.68	<0.81	<0.93	<1.05	<1.17	<1.29	>1.29

The label also contains:

- the energy consumption per cycle (washing and drying)
- the energy consumption per cycle – washing only
- washing performance – with a class from A to G
- the maximum spin speed
- the total cotton capacity (washing and drying separately)
- water consumption for a full load washed and dried – note that condenser dryers may use significant amounts of water on the drying cycle
- noise in dB (A) (separately for washing, spinning, and drying)

=== Dishwashers ===
The energy efficiency of a dishwasher is calculated according to the number of place settings. For the most common size of appliance, the 12 place setting machine the following classes apply up to 2010.

Dishwashers (12 place settings, in kWh; pre-2010)
A	B	C	D	E	F	G
<1.06	<1.25	<1.45	<1.65	<1.85	<2.05	>2.05

After 2010, a new system is used, based on an energy efficiency index (EEI), which is based on the annual power usage, based on stand-by power consumption and 280 cleaning cycles, relative to the standard power usage for that type of dishwasher. For a 12-place-setting dishwasher, an EEI of 100 corresponds to 462 kWh per year (approximately 52.7 watts, on average).

Dishwashers (as EEI; after 2010)
A^{+++}	A^{++}	A^{+}	A	B	C	D
<50	<56	<63	<71	<80	<90	>90

After 2021, the energy efficiency index (EEI) thresholds were updated.

Dishwashers (as EEI; after 2021)
A	B	C	D	E	F	G
<32	<38	<44	<50	<56	<62	>62

The label also contains:

- the energy consumption in kW·h /cycle
- the efficiency of the washing cycle with a class from A to G
- the efficiency of the drying cycle with a class from A to G
- the capacity as a number of place settings
- the water consumption in litres per cycle
- noise in dB(A)

=== Ovens ===
For ovens, the label also contains:

- the efficiency with a class from A to G
- the energy consumption in kW·h
- the volume in litres
- the type (small/medium/large)

== Air conditioners ==
For air conditioners, the directive applies only to units under 12 kW. Every label contains the following information:

- the model,
- the energy efficiency category from A+++ to G,
- the annual energy consumption (full load at 500 hours per year)
- the cooling output at full load in kW
- the energy efficiency ratio in cooling mode at full load
- the appliance type (cooling only, cooling/heating)
- the cooling mode (air- or water-cooled)
- the noise rating in dB (where applicable)

Labels for air conditioners with heating capability also contain:

- the heat output at full load in kW
- the heating mode energy efficiency category

Air conditioners, cooling SEER in W/W
A^{+++}	A^{++}	A^{+}	A	B	C	D	E	F	G
>8.5	>6.1	>5.6	>5.1	>4.6	>4.1	>3.6	>3.1	>2.6	<2.6

Air conditioners, heating SCOP in W/W
A^{+++}	A^{++}	A^{+}	A	B	C	D	E	F	G
>5.1	>4.6	>4.0	>3.4	>3.1	>2.8	>2.5	>2.2	>1.9	<1.9

== Light bulbs ==
=== From 1 September 2021 ===
Every label of light sources, including light bulbs (halogen, compact fluorescent, etc.) or LED modules/lamps, contains the following information:

- the energy efficiency category from A to G
- the electricity consumption of the lamp in kWh per 1000 hours

Where the energy efficiency category is given by this table:

Light sources, in $\eta_{TM}$
A	B	C	D	E	F	G
≥210	>185	>160	>135	>110	>85	<85

Where, $\eta_{TM}$, is defined as the total mains efficacy, calculated as: $\eta_{TM}=\Big( \frac{\phi_{use}}{P_{on}}\Big) \times F_{TM} \text{ (lm/W)}$

Where $\phi_{use}$ is the declared useful luminous flux (in lm), $P_{on}$ is the declared on-mode power consumption (in watts), and $F_{TM}$ is a factor between 0.926 and 1.176 depending on the light source being or not directional and being or not powered from mains. Non-directional operating on mains: 1,000 and not operating on mains: 0,926; directional on mains: 1,176 and not on mains: 1,089.

=== Until 31 August 2021 ===
Energy classes of light bulbs in terms of luminous flux and power consumption (until 31 August 2021)

Every label of light bulbs and tubes (including incandescent light bulbs, fluorescent lamps, LED lamps) contains the following information:

- the energy efficiency category from A to G
- the luminous flux of the bulb in lumens
- the electricity consumption of the lamp in watts
- the average life length in hours

According to the light bulb's electrical consumption relative to a standard (GLS or incandescent), the lightbulb is in one of the following classes:

Light bulbs; relative energy consumption
A	B	C	D	E	F	G
<18–25%	<60%	<80%	<95%	<110%	<130%	>130%

Class A is defined in a different way; hence, the variable percentage.

Since 2012 A+ and A++ classes are added and are introduced different classes for directional lamps and non-directional lamps.

New Non-directional lamps EEI
A++	A+	A	B	C	D	E
<11%	<17%	<24%	<60%	<80%	<95%	>95%

Directional lamps are defined as "having at least 80% light output within a solid angle of π sr (corresponding to a cone with angle of 120°)".

New Directional lamps EEI
A++	A+	A	B	C	D	E
<13%	<18%	<40%	<95%	<120%	<175%	>175%

These lamp classes correspond roughly to the following lamp types:

Lamp technology	Energy class
Sodium-vapor lamps	A+++...A
LED lamps	A++...A
Compact fluorescent lamps with bare tubes	A
Compact fluorescent lamps with bulb-shaped cover	A...B
Halogen lamps with infrared coating	B
Halogen lamps with xenon gas filling, 230 V	C
Conventional halogen lamps at 12–24 V	C
Conventional halogen lamps at 230 V	D...F
Incandescent light bulbs	E...G

Since September 2009, household light bulbs must be class A, with the exception of clear (transparent) lamps. For the latter category, lamps must be class C or better, with a transition period up to September 2012, and class B after September 2016.

==== Calculation ====
Incandescent and fluorescent lamps with and without an integrated ballast can be divided into energy efficiency classes. The division of lamps into such classes was made in EU Directive 98/11/EC on 27 January 1998, and included lamps that are not marketed for use in the home. Light sources with an output of more than 6,500 lm and those that are not operated on line voltage are excluded. The energy efficiency class is determined as follows (Φ is the luminous flux in lm and P is the power consumption of the lamp in W):

Lamps are classified into class A if:

$$P  \leq 0.240  \cdot \sqrt{\Phi} + 0.0103 \cdot \Phi.$$

Fluorescent lamps without integrated ballast, are classified into class A if:

$$P  \leq 0.150  \cdot \sqrt{\Phi} + 0.0097 \cdot \Phi.$$

The classification in the energy efficiency class B-G is based on the percentage (Energy Efficiency Index) at the reference power

$$P_\mathrm{R} = \begin{cases}
0.88\cdot\sqrt{\Phi}+0.049\cdot\Phi&(\Phi>34\mbox{ lm})\\
0.2\cdot\Phi&(\Phi\leq34\mbox{ lm})
\end{cases}$$

about the power consumption of a standard light bulb with the same luminous flux.

== Television ==
The current regulation on energy labels for televisions (and other electronic displays) was introduced in 2019, replacing the previous 2010 version.

The energy class is based on the Energy Efficiency Index (EEI), which is the power consumption relative to a reference power consumption. The index of a normal television with screen area A (in dm^{2}) is

$$EEI_{label} = \frac{(P_{measured} + 1)}{(3\times [90\times tanh(0.025 + 0.0035\times(A-11))+4]+3)+corr_{l}}$$

Where $P_{\mathrm{measured}}$ is the measured power in on mode in Watts in the normal configuration, and $corr_{l}$ is a correction factor used for digital signage.

For example, a television with a diagonal length of 82 cm has a screen area of A = 28.7 dm^{2} and a reference power consumption of 38W. The energy classes are as in the table below.

EEI label
A	B	C	D	E	F	G
< 0.30	< 0.40	< 0.50	< 0.60	< 0.75	< 0.90	0.90 ≤

In televisions with automatic brightness control (ABC), the on-mode power consumption is reduced by 10 % if the following conditions are fulfilled:

- ABC is enabled in the normal configuration of the electronic display and persists in any other standard dynamic range configuration available to the end user
- the value of $P_{\mathrm{measured}}$, in the normal configuration, is measured, with ABC disabled or if ABC cannot be disabled, in an ambient light condition of 100 lux measured at the ABC sensor
- if applicable, the value of $P_{\mathrm{measured}}$ with ABC disabled shall be equal to or greater than the on mode power measured with ABC enabled in an ambient light condition of 100 lux measured at the ABC sensor
- with ABC enabled, the measured value of the on mode power must decrease by 20 % or more when the ambient light condition, measured at the ABC sensor, is reduced from 100 lux to 12 lux
- the ABC control of the display screen luminance meets all of the following characteristics when the ambient light condition measured at the ABC sensor changes:
  - the measured screen luminance at 60 lux is between 65 % and 95 % of the screen luminance measured at 100 lux
  - the measured screen luminance at 35 lux is between 50 % and 80 % of the screen luminance measured at 100 lux
  - the measured screen luminance at 12 lux is between 35 % and 70 % of the screen luminance measured at 100 lux

== Cars ==
An Irish Car CO_{2} Label

For vehicles possessing internal combustion engines, carbon dioxide emissions in grams per kilometre travelled are considered (instead of electrical efficiency).

Cars, CO_{2} emission in g/km
A	B	C	D	E	F	G
<100	<120	<140	<160	<200	<250	>250

Other information that is indexed for the energy label is:

- its brand
- its model
- its version
- its fuel
- its transmission type
- its weight
- the different consumptions of fuel
  - mixed consumption
  - urban consumption
  - extra-urban consumption
- the CO_{2} emissions in grammes per kilometre

== Tyres ==
European tyre labels came into force in November 2012. The tyre labelling will show three tyre performance attributes; rolling resistance, wet grip and external rolling noise. The tyre label apply to:

- Car and SUV tyres
- Van tyres
- Truck tyres

with the exception of:

- Tyres for cars made before 1 October 1990
- Re-treaded tyres
- Motorcycle tyres
- Racing/sports car tyres
- Studded tyres
- Spare tyres
- Vintage car tyres
- Professional off-road tyres.

== Society and culture ==
=== Impacts on purchasing decisions ===
A trial of estimated financial energy cost of refrigerators alongside EU energy-efficiency class (EEEC) labels online found that the approach of labels involves a trade-off between financial considerations and higher cost requirements in effort or time for the product-selection from the many available options – which are often unlabelled and don't have any EEEC-requirement for being bought, used or sold within the EU. Moreover, in this one trial the labeling was ineffective in shifting purchases towards more sustainable options.

== See also ==
- Ecolabel
- Home energy performance certificate
- House energy rating
- Energy policy of the European Union
- Fuel mix disclosure on labelling the origins and environmental effects of electricity
- European tyre labels

=== Other energy labels ===
- (United States) EnergyGuide
- (Canada) EnerGuide
- (Australia) (New Zealand) Energy rating label
- China Energy Label
