= Efficiency (disambiguation) =

Efficiency is the extent to which time or effort is well used for the intended task or purpose.

Efficiency may also refer to:

- Efficiency (aerodynamics), the amount of lift divided by the aerodynamic drag
- Efficiency (apartment), a one-room apartment
- Efficiency (basketball), a statistical benchmark to compare the overall value of players
- Efficiency (computer science), related to the amount of computational resources used by the algorithm
- Efficiency (economics), a situation in which nothing can be improved without something else being hurt
  - Efficiency (fair division), any changes made to assist one person would harm another
- Efficiency (finance), non-mean-variance portfolio analysis, a way of showing that a portfolio is not efficient
- Efficiency (mechanical)
- Efficiency (network science), a measure of how efficiently a network exchanges information
- Efficiency (statistics), a measure of quality of an estimator, experiment, or test
- Energy efficiency (physics), the ratio of power consumed to useful power output
- Knot efficiency, the relative knot strength

== See also ==
- Efficient (horse) (foaled 2003), a New Zealand Thoroughbred racehorse
- Effectiveness
- Inefficiency (disambiguation)
- Energy efficiency (disambiguation)
