= EnergyGuide =

Label showing the energy cost of appliances

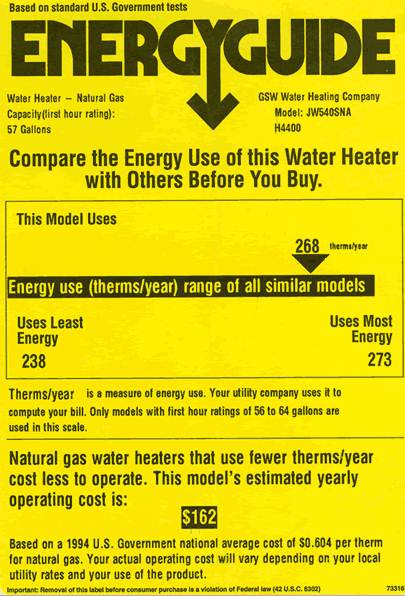
An EnergyGuide Label

The EnergyGuide provides consumers in the United States information about the energy consumption, efficiency, and operating costs of appliances and consumer products.

Clothes washers, dishwashers, refrigerators, freezers, televisions, water heaters, window air conditioners, mini split air conditioners, central air conditioners, furnaces, boilers, heat pumps, and other electronic appliances are all required to have EnergyGuide labels. The label must show the model number, the size, key features, and display largely a graph showing the annual operating cost in range with similar models, and the estimated yearly energy cost.

Appliance energy labeling was mandated by the Energy Policy and Conservation Act of 1975, which directed the Federal Trade Commission to "develop and administer a mandatory energy labeling program covering major appliances, equipment, and lighting." The first appliance labeling rule was established in 1979 and all products were required to carry the label starting in 1980.

Energy Star is a similar labeling program, but requires more stringent efficiency standards for an appliance to become qualified, and is not a required program, but rather a voluntary one.

== See also ==
- EnerGuide – A similar label used in Canada which also includes a whole-house evaluation
- European Union energy label – A similar label used in European Union
- Energy rating label – A similar label in Australia & New Zealand
