= Energy Performance of Buildings Directive 2024 =

Energy initiative

The Energy Performance of Buildings Directive (2024/1275), the "EPBD") is the European Union's main legislative instrument aiming to promote the improvement of the energy performance of buildings within the European Union. It was inspired by the Kyoto Protocol which commits the EU and all its parties by setting binding emission reduction targets.

The recast was signed on 24 April 2024, published in the Official Journal on 8 May 2024 and entered into force on 28 May 2024. It repeals Directive 2010/31/EU with effect from 30 May 2026.

== History ==
=== Directive 2002/91/EC ===
The first version of the EPBD, directive 2002/91/EC, was approved on 16 December 2002 and entered into force on 4 January 2003. EU Member States (MS) had to comply with the Directive within three years of the inception date (4 January 2006), by bringing into force necessary laws, regulations and administrative provisions. In the case of lack of qualified and/or accredited experts, the directive allowed for a further extension in implementation by 4 January 2006.

The Directive required that the MS strengthen their building regulations and introduce energy performance certification of buildings. More specifically, it required member states to comply with Article 7 (Energy Performance Certificates), Article 8 (Inspection of boilers) and Article 9 (Inspection of air conditioning systems).

=== Directive 2010/31/EU ===
Directive 2002/91/EC was later on replaced by the so-called "EPBD recast", which was approved on 19 May 2010 and entered into force on 18 June 2010.

This version of the EPBD (Directive 2010/31/EU) broadened its focus on Nearly Zero-energy buildings, cost optimal levels of minimum energy performance requirements as well as improved policies.

According to the recast:

- for buildings offered for sale or rent, the energy performance certificates shall be stated in the advertisements
- Member States shall lay down the necessary measures to establish inspection schemes for heating and air-conditioning systems or take measures with equivalent impact
- all new buildings shall be nearly zero energy buildings by 31 December 2020; the same applies to all new public buildings after 31 December 2018.
- Member States shall set minimum energy performance requirements for new buildings, for buildings subject to major renovation, as well as for the replacement or retrofit of building elements
- Member States shall draw up lists of national financial measures and instruments to improve the energy efficiency of buildings.

=== Directive 2018/844/EU ===
On 30 November 2016, the European Commission published the "Clean Energy For All Europeans", a package of measures boosting the clean energy transition in line with its commitment to cut CO_{2} emissions by at least 40% by 2030, modernise the economy and create conditions for sustainable jobs and growth.

The proposal for a revised directive on the EPBD (COM/2016/0765) puts energy efficiency first and supports cost-effective building renovation. The proposal updated the EPBD through:

- The incorporation of long-term building renovation strategies (Article of 4 Energy Efficiency Directive), the support to mobilise finance and a clear vision for the decarbonisation of buildings by 2050
- The encouragement of the use of information communication and smart technologies to ensure the efficient operation of buildings
- Streamlined provisions in the case of delivery failure of the expected results
- introduces building automation and control (BAC) systems as an alternative to physical inspections
- encourages the roll-out of the required infrastructure for e-mobility and introduces a "smartness indicator"
- strengthens the links between public funding for building renovation and energy performance certificates and
- incentivises tackling energy poverty through building renovation.

On 11 October 2017, the European Parliament's Committee on Industry, Research and Energy (ITRE) voted positively on a draft report led by Danish MEP Bendt Bendtsen. The Committee "approved rules to channel the focus towards energy-efficiency and cost-effectiveness of building renovations in the EU, updating the EPBD as part of the "Clean Energy for All Europeans" package".

Bendt Bendtsen, member of ITRE and rapporteur of the EPBD review dossier said: "It is vital that Member States show a clear commitment and take concrete actions in their long-term planning. This includes facilitating access to financial tools, showing investors that energy efficiency renovations are prioritised, and enabling public authorities to invest in well-performing buildings".

The proposal was finally approved by the Council and the European Parliament in May 2018.

=== Directive (EU) 2024/1275 ===
In 2021, the European Commission, under the leadership of Estonian Commissioner Kadri Simson proposed a new revision of the Directive, in the context of the "Fit for 55" legislative package. The proposal included more exigent minimum energy performance standards for new and existing buildings and improved availability of energy performance certificates through public online databases. Its priorities were:

- Obligation for all member states to establish National building renovation plans
- Establishment of minimum energy performance standards (MEPS), requiring the worst energy performant (non-residential) buildings to reach at least class F by 2030 and class E by 2033.
- Promotion of technical assistance, including one-stop-shops and renovation passports
- Introduction of new financial mechanisms to incentivize banks and mortgage holders to promote energy efficient renovation (mortgage portfolio standard)

Following the start of the Russian invasion of Ukraine, the Commission issued additional proposals, such as the obligation to ensure new buildings are solar ready and to install solar energy installations on buildings.

The European Parliament's rapporteur for the file was Green MEP Ciarán Cuffe. Parliament and Council reached a provisional agreement in December 2023; Parliament adopted the text on 12 March 2024 and the Council on 12 April 2024.

== EPBD support initiatives ==
The European Commission has launched practical support initiatives with the objective to help and support EU countries with the implementation of the EPBD.

=== EPBD Concerted Action ===
The Concerted Action EPBD (CA EPBD) was launched in 2005 under the European Union's Horizon 2020 research and innovation programme to address the Energy Performance of Buildings Directive (EPBD), with the objective to promote dialogue and exchange of knowledge and best practices between all 28 Member States and Norway for reducing energy use in buildings.

The first CA EPBD was launched in 2005 and closed in June 2007 followed by a second phase and a third phase from 2011 to 2015. CA EPBD IV, a joint initiative between the EU Member States and the European Commission, ran from October 2015 to March 2018 with the aim of supporting transposition and implementation of the 2010 recast. Further phases have followed to support the 2018 and 2024 revisions.

=== EPBD Buildings Platform ===
The EPBD Buildings Platform was launched by the European Commission in the framework of the Intelligent Energy – Europe, 2003–2006 Programme, as the central resource of information on the EPBD. The Platform comprises databases with publications, events, standards and software tools. Interested organisations or individuals could submit events and publications to the databases. A high number of information papers (fact sheets) were also produced, with the aim to inform a wide range of people of the status of work in a specific area. The platform also offered a helpdesk with lists of frequently asked questions and the possibility to ask individual questions.

This initiative was completed at the end of 2008, and a new one, 'BUILD UP' was launched in 2009.

=== BUILD UP ===
As a continuation of its support to the Member States in implementing the EPBD, the European Commission launched the BUILD UP initiative in 2009. The initiative has been receiving funding under the framework of the Intelligent Energy Europe (IEE) Programme. The first BUILD UP (BUILD UP I) was launched in 2009 and closed in 2011 when BUILD UP II followed in 2012 and ran until 2014. BUILD UP III was running from January 2015 until December 2017. BUILD UP IV started in early 2018.

The BUILD UP web portal aims to increase awareness and foster the market transformation towards Nearly Zero-Energy Buildings, catalysing and releasing Europe's collective intelligence for an effective implementation of energy saving measures in buildings, by connecting building professionals, including competent authorities.

The portal includes databases of publications, news, events, software tools & blog posts. Since the start of BUILD UP II in 2009 the portal introduced added value content items namely as overview articles (allowing for users to read / download them on demand) and free participation webinars, providing an effective learning resource.

The platform also incorporates the "BUILD UP Skills" webpage, an initiative launched in 2011 under the IEE programme to assist with the training and further education of craftsmen, on-site workers and systems installers of the building sector. BUILD UP hosts all BUILD UP Skills related information (EU Exchange Meetings, Technical Working Groups (TWGs), National pages and country factsheets, news, events and previous newsletters) under its separate section "Skills".

=== Intelligent Energy Europe (IEE) Programme ===
The EU's Intelligent Energy Europe (IEE) Programme was launched in 2003; the first IEE Programme (IEE I) closed in 2006, and was followed by the second IEE Programme (IEE II) from 2007 to 2013. Most parts of the IEE programme were run by the Executive Agency for SMEs, EASME -formerly known as the Executive Agency for Competitiveness and Innovation (EACI)- on behalf of the European Commission. The Programme "supported projects which sought to overcome non-technical barriers to the uptake, implementation and replication of innovative sustainable energy solutions". From 2007 to 2013, the IEE II Programme allocated €72m (16% of the entire IEE II funding) to 63 building-related projects (including CA EPBD II & III), revealing the strong support for enabling EPBD implementation. The range of topics was broad, covering the fields of deep renovation, Nearly Zero-Energy Buildings, Energy Performance Certificates, renewable energy and the exemplary role of public buildings. Since the Programme's completion, the EU's Horizon 2020 Framework Programme has been funding these types of activities.

== Reception ==
=== Legislative process ===
The 2021 recast proposal was among the most contested files of the European Green Deal. Critics argued that mandatory renovation targets risked making housing unaffordable for tenants and homeowners already facing high energy bills, and that the proposal did not adequately account for historic buildings. Opposition was led by the Italian government; Infrastructure Minister Matteo Salvini said in January 2024 that Italy would oppose the directive "in the name of common sense and realism". In Germany, the 2023 debate over the national Gebäudeenergiegesetz ("heating law") was reported to have spilled over into the EU negotiations. Ahead of the final vote there were concerns that EPP members, in particular the German delegation, might block the text; the European Parliament nevertheless adopted it on 12 March 2024 by 370 votes to 199.

=== Changes from the Commission proposal ===
The final text dropped the Commission's proposed obligation for individual residential buildings to meet minimum energy performance classes by set dates. Instead, Member States must reduce the average primary energy use of the residential building stock by at least 16% by 2030 and by 20–22% by 2035, relative to 2020, with at least 55% of the reduction to come from renovating the worst-performing 43% of the stock. Minimum energy performance standards for individual buildings were retained only for the non-residential stock. In January 2026 the Commission's BUILD UP platform published a guide addressing what it described as widespread misconceptions about renovation obligations and costs under the directive.

== Transposition ==
Member States were required to transpose the directive by 29 May 2026, with an earlier deadline of 1 January 2025 for Article 17(15), which prohibits financial incentives for stand-alone fossil fuel boilers. In November 2025 the Commission opened infringement procedures against Estonia, Italy and Hungary for failing to transpose Article 17(15). In March 2026, 19 Member States received letters of formal notice over delayed national building renovation plans. On 15 July 2026 the Commission sent letters of formal notice to all 27 Member States for failing to fully transpose the directive by the May deadline, giving them two months to respond. At the same time it published its first assessment of 16 draft national building renovation plans submitted by 15 Member States and the Walloon Region of Belgium.

=== Sweden ===
In Sweden, the Riksdag adopted amendments to the Planning and Building Act and the Act on Energy Performance Certificates for Buildings with effect from 1 July 2026, a date the national housing agency Boverket acknowledged was later than the directive's deadline. A new energy class A0 for zero-emission buildings was introduced into the Swedish certificate scale on 25 May 2026, with further Boverket regulations to follow during 2026.

== European Economic Area ==
The directive is marked as EEA-relevant. Its predecessor, Directive 2010/31/EU, was incorporated into the EEA Agreement and implemented in Norway, where it became the basis for energy certification rules from 1 March 2024. Iceland was granted a temporary exemption from the 2010 directive by EEA Joint Committee Decision No 135/2022, on the grounds of its relatively recent and uniform building stock.

The 2018 amending directive was incorporated by Joint Committee Decision No 175/2025 of 11 July 2025, some seven years after its adoption in the EU; the decision's entry into force was conditional on Norway completing constitutional procedures, which it did on 10 August 2026. The decision extended Iceland's exemption until the 2024 recast is incorporated. In an attached declaration, Iceland stated that it had not implemented any previous version of the EU buildings acquis and that implementation would require an entirely new legislative framework.

As of August 2026, the 2024 recast remained under scrutiny by the EEA EFTA states and no draft Joint Committee Decision had been submitted. The Norwegian Ministry of Energy held a public consultation on the directive with a deadline of 5 January 2026 as input to its assessment for the EEA process, and has stated that the directive imposes no requirement on Norwegian homeowners to upgrade their homes and that it is too early to say when a decision on incorporation will be taken. The campaign organisation Nei til EU has argued that the directive is not EEA-relevant and that Norway should seek exemptions or use its right of reservation, while the trade association Bygghåndverk Norge supported the directive but warned against focusing on new-build requirements rather than the existing stock.

== See also ==
- Energy law
- Energy performance certificate, which arose from the implementation of the Directive in the United Kingdom
- EU law
- UK enterprise law
