= Energy performance certificate =

Rating scheme to summarise the energy efficiency of buildings or devices

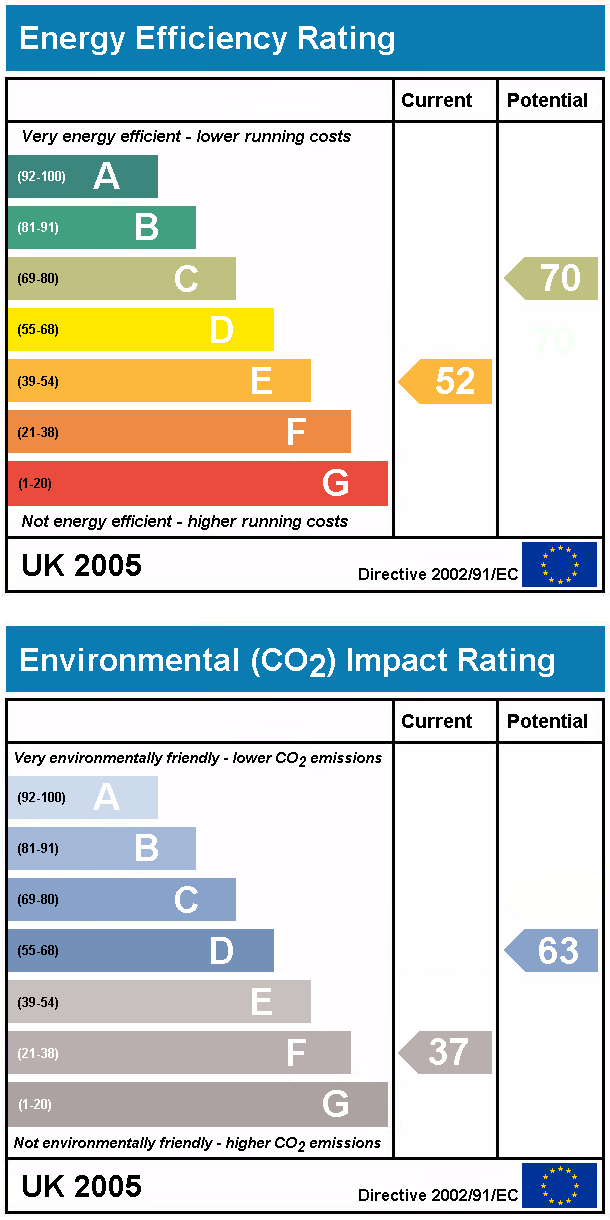
Home energy performance rating charts

An energy performance certificate (EPC) is a rating scheme to summarise the energy efficiency of buildings or devices.

== European Union ==
In the European Union, EPCs are regulated by Energy Performance of Buildings Directive 2010.

== Turkey ==
EPCs are mandatory when buying or selling property.

== United Kingdom ==
Energy performance certificates (EPCs) are a rating scheme to summarise the energy efficiency of buildings. The building is given a rating between A (Very efficient) - G (Inefficient). The EPC will also include tips about the most cost-effective ways to improve the home energy rating.

== United States ==
Energy Star (trademarked ENERGY STAR) is a program run by the U.S. Environmental Protection Agency (EPA) and U.S. Department of Energy (DOE) that promotes energy efficiency. The program provides information on the energy consumption of products and devices using different standardized methods. The Energy Star label is found on more than 75 different certified product categories, homes, commercial buildings, and industrial plants. In the United States, the Energy Star label is also shown on the Energy Guide appliance label of qualifying products.

== See also ==
- Domestic energy assessor
- House energy rating
- Home Energy Rating
