= Energy rating label =

Label showing the energy efficiency

A typical energy rating label

In Australia and New Zealand, an energy rating label or energy rating is a label affixed to various appliances prior to retail sale, which allows consumers to compare the energy efficiency of product and allows consumers to know how much power a particular model will use to run. They allow consumers to compare the energy consumption of similar products, and factor lifetime running cost into their purchasing decision. The energy rating label is a mandatory comparison label under Australian regulations for store sales but not for products sold online. The label comprises an energy consumption figure for the appliance and a star rating. The energy consumption figure is an estimate of how much energy (in kilowatt-hours or kWh) the appliance will use over a year, based on assumptions about "average usage".

However, actual energy consumption will depend on how an appliance is used and how often it is used. Factors like climate can also influence energy consumption (and efficiency) for some appliances.

The energy rating label usually incorporates an energy star label, which is an endorsement label that is not regulated by the Australian Government. It is an international standard for energy efficient consumer products that originated in the United States. Appliances and equipment that qualify to carry the energy star mark are generally in the top 25% most energy efficient products. In Australia, the label is used for office equipment and home electronics. New Zealand uses the energy star label for a much wider range of products such as whitegoods, lighting, heating, water heating and windows.

== History ==
The label was introduced in 1986 in the Australian states of New South Wales and Victoria and later its use was extended to all states and territories. A mandatory, national labelling scheme was agreed to in 1992. Australia was the third country to establish such a system, after Canada and the United States.

An International Energy Agency survey revealed that compliance by retailers showing the labels was raised from 94% in 2001 to 98% in 2009.

== See also ==
- Energy input labeling
- Energy policy in Australia
- European Union energy label
- House Energy Rating
- WELS rating
