= House Energy Rating =

Standard measure of the energy efficiency of a building

The House Energy Rating (HER) or House Energy Rating Scheme (HERS) are worldwide standard measures of comparison by which one can evaluate the energy efficiency of a new or an existing building. The comparison is generally done for energy requirements for heating and cooling of indoor space. The energy is the main criterion considered by any international building energy rating scheme but there are some other important factors such as production of greenhouse gases emission, indoor environment quality, cost efficiency and thermal comfort, which are considered by some schemes. Basically, the energy rating of a residential building provides detailed information on the energy consumption and the relative energy efficiency of the building. Hence, HERs inform consumers about the relative energy efficiency of homes and encourage them to use this information in making their house purchase decision.

There are many energy rating tools by which one can calculate the energy performance of a building. Basically all these tools involve a numerical description or prepare a computer-based model for the rating of a building against standard occupancy and activity templates. HERS uses computer-simulation based methods for assessing the energy efficiency of buildings under standard conditions and its potential for improvement.

== House energy rating schemes ==
HERS is a standardized scheme for evaluation of a home's energy efficiency and expected energy costs. A HERS represents the guideline of a House energy rating. In all countries, HERS show variations in objectives, assessment methodologies and measurement criteria but after all this variation, the goal of all HERS is approximately same and these generate the output in same way.

=== HERS outputs ===
Basically HERS generates three types of outputs

Rating Scores
The energy performance rating is a type of energy assessment how efficiently the buildings use energy, relative to similar buildings. The performance scores use generally a scale ranging from 0 to 100 or 1 to 5 stars. The value of score is based on the comparison made between the rated house and a reference house that meets a desired energy code or standards.A rating of 50 indicates average energy performance, while a rating of 75 or more indicates best performance. More the score obtained by a house more will be the energy efficiency of the house and the high rating scores have many direct applications, such as it permits a buyer to quality for more mortgage comparatively.
Energy use/Cost prediction
HERS generate energy use and cost predictions for specific end uses like space heating/cooling, hot water and for whole house. These outputs are obtained in absolute measures and unlike to score rating these outputs can be used to compare houses like that of miles-per-gallon ratings are used to compare the cars.
Recommendations
HERS can produce a list of recommended improvements based on some life cycle's effective cost analysis. These recommendations may be pertaining to any of the inefficient components of a building i.e. insulation layer in the composite wall of building, air conditioning equipment, water heating unit, double-glazed windows, etc.

== HERS types ==
As per national energy policies, HERS are known by different names in different countries. The implementation and promotion of HERS in a country depends upon the national energy policy. Beside all this, the aim of all HERS is almost same and it can be classified into three types:

- Perspective: Provides minimum standards for the materials, equipments and methods of efficient design and construction that must be met to qualify for an energy efficiency rating.
- Calculation based: Uses computer based modeling for the prediction of energy performance relative to the requirements/standards.
- Performance based: The energy efficiency of building is checked by comparing the actual energy consumption data against the set standards.

== Need for HERS ==
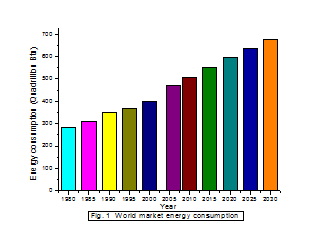
Worlds past, present and future energy consumption scenario

Increase in population, economic issues are the some factors which have escalated the energy demand across the world. In developed countries, the growth rate of energy consumption rate is 1.1% per year while in developing countries the energy consumption growth rate is approximately three times that of developed countries. Beside this high growth in energy consumption it also causes to increase the production of green house gases to the atmosphere. The increase in demand of energy, limited resource of convention energy sources, hike in conventional fuel prices, global warming are some important factors which Impetus us to adopt energy saving techniques and alternative sources of energy. Building sector consumes one third of world's resources. Building currently shares approximately 40% of energy in most of the countries and are considered among the largest end-use sector. As per International energy agency (IEA) world energy consumption and green house gases level is going to increase rapidly every year. IEA recognize the building sector as one of the most cost effective sector where energy consumption can be reduced. It is estimated that the energy consumption can be reduced to 1509 million tonnes of equivalent (Mtoe) and at the same time it will cause to reduce the green house gases production up to 12.6 gigatonnes (Gt) by 2050. The international energy outlook report reveals that the energy consumption is increasing in each year and the energy increment trends are shown in the right-hand figure.

So, we conclude that the building sector is one of the largest sector where energy consumption and green house gases emission can be reduced effectively by improving the energy efficiency of buildings and hence HERS can play a vital role in achieving all this.

== In different countries ==
=== Australia ===
In Australia, Five star is the first house-rating scheme, which was developed in 1980 by the GMI council of Australia. This scheme was basically based on the three basic elements, glass, mass and insulation of dwelling. Due to many limitations this system failed to attain popularity and in 1990s they develop Victorian scheme. This scheme attains some popularity but it was also not suitable for all climate of Australia. In 1993 a more flexible HERE, known by Graded five star rating system was developed. This rating scheme was much flexible and was suitable to all climatic conditions of Australia. Presently there are different HERS available in Australia which are used in different Australian states. Some of HERS used in this country are:

- NatHERS
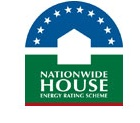
  Nationwide House Energy Rating Scheme
- AccuRate
- FirstRate
- Quick Rate
- BERS
- Q Rare

=== Brazil ===
In Brazil, the first national program for energy efficiency in buildings (HERS), PROCEL EDIFICA was developed in 2003. The use of this rating scheme was extended to public and commercial sector in 2007 and from 2012 the operational rating is mandatory for both residential and commercial buildings. The rating system consist of a scale ranging from A to E basis, where A represent the most efficient and E represent the least efficient rating. The rating scheme consider three aspects of buildings;

1. Building envelope thermal performance
2. Lighting system efficiency
3. Installed power and air conditioning system efficiency

The three groups are evaluate individually and the combined results of these indicates the level of efficiency of a building.

=== Canada ===
In Canada, home energy ratings have been in existence since 1997. The two government energy rating programs are:

- EnerGuide, for key consumer items—houses, light-duty vehicles, and certain energy-using products
- EnerGuide for New Houses, a sister program of the above

Both of these programs use HOT2XP and HOT 2000 as their rating tools. Beside the aforesaid government rating programs in Canada, there are two standard bases are available for evaluating the building are;

1. R-2000: as per this rating, 80-85 points are needed to meet Canadian specification code.
2. Model national energy code of Canada (MNECB): as per this rating, 70-75 points are needed to meet Canadian specification code.
3. Other HERS in Canada

LEED is used in Canada as one of home rating scheme. This rating scheme is an adaption of the US green building council's LEED and has been modified as per the Canadian climate, construction and regulation policies.

=== China ===
In China, the Ministry of Housing and Urban-Rural Development (MOHURD) developed a national building energy rating and labeling HERS in 2008. This HERS is mandatory for government buildings, big commercial complexes and those buildings applying for public retrofit funding or green label. this HERS consist a star rating scheme, ranging from 1 to 5 star. As per this HERS, more the star, more will be the energy efficiency of the building. The rating level of buildings is determined in three parameters;

1. Basic Items: refers to the regulated energy use per square meter, obtained by computer modeling or measurements.
2. Required Items: refers to minimum performance requirements for building envelope and Heating Ventilation and Air-Conditioning (HVAC).
3. Optional Items: refers to the additional energy management system which are not mandatory in the rating scheme. it covers, the application of renewable energy, innovative energy efficient technologies.

=== Denmark ===
In Denmark, the energy rating scheme are in existence since 1981. Denmark is the first country in Europe (EU) to begin issuing Energy Performance certificates (EPCs). The EPCs are mandatory in all types of buildings in Denmark. The rating system in Denmark includes three parts.

1. The first part of rating consists reports on water consumption, energy consumption and GHGs emission per year, which are compared against a standard building of same type on a scale ranging from A1-C5.
2. Second part of the system, proposes the different possible ways for saving of energy and water consumption with respect to the cost involved
3. This part of report provides the present state of buildings in term of size, heating system, energy usage and the cost of energy and heating.

=== France ===
In France, "Diagnostic de performance energetique" (DPE) is used as HERS. This scheme was developed in November 2006 and in July 2007 its use becomes mandatory for all those buildings whose registration had been filed after 1 July 2007. This rating scheme consist of two types of measurements.

- Energy consumption
- Greenhouse gas emissions

Both of the measurements comprises 7-label ratings, ranging from A (best) to G (worst) which are presented by the color coding. In ratings, the green color represents A and red color represents G label. In both cases of measurements, the buildings are evaluated in terms of necessary resource for heating, hot water production and air conditioning. The PDE of a building remains valid for 10 years.

=== Ireland ===
In Ireland, the building energy ratings are in existence since 2007. In this country Building Energy Rating (BER) is used as EPC. The scheme was mandatory for new dwelling and in 2008, its use was extended to non-residential and public buildings, in 2009 the HERS cover the all types of buildings. BER is a calculation based HERS. Due to transparency in this HERS, there is a more awareness among the people and is accepted widely.

=== Portugal ===
In Portugal, the EPCs scheme was launched in July 2007 and was implemented for new buildings. The use of this scheme was extended to existing buildings in January 2009. This rating scheme covers mainly the indoor air quality and energy performance of the buildings. This rating scheme is also a calculation based HERS. The compliance in the country is high and the EPC is issued only when 90% of building completion and transaction observed. There is a national database who covers all EPCs registration record and this is available for all countrymen.

=== United Kingdom ===
The United Kingdom (UK) is one of the countries where HERS has been developed and implemented strongly from a very long time ago. In UK, National Home Energy Rating (NHER) scheme is used widely. NHER scheme measure the thermal efficiency of the dwellings on a scale of 0–10 in terms of energy running cost. The dwelling rating is done through computer modeling which uses a computer program based on Building Research Establishment Domestic Energy Model (BREDEM). Basically NHER measure the energy efficiency of dwellings as a function of energy cost per square meter. The energy usage is calculated by considering the all aspects of buildings (location, design, construction, water heating, cooking, ventilation and appliances, lighting etc.) and for dwelling energy rating it use some standard assumptions, such as occupancy scenario, thermostat setting, occupant stay timings.

=== United States ===
In the United States, HERS are since 1980s. Among the various HERS energy rated homes of America is used widely. It is used in more than 18 states of US. This scheme uses a 100 points scale of efficiency and it is further divided into 10 categories of star rating which ranges from one star to five star plus. In this rating scheme a higher star rated house represents higher energy efficiency of the house.

ENERGY STAR

The energy efficiency rating in this HERS represents the predicted energy consumption, represents the form of normalized annual energy consumption. This rating scheme consist a detailed measure of CFLs, water heater tanks, ceiling, floors and pipe insulation, efficient refrigerator and freezer, high efficient space and water heating equipments, air leakage and controls. The other important rating schemes used in US are:

- Building green house rating
- LEED
- CHEERS
- RECA 2000
- Kanas
- HOT 2000
- Ohio
- REM/Rate
- TRET
- Energy gauge USA
- T.A.P.
- BESTTEST
- HEED

== Issues regarding building energy rating schemes ==
- Rating and achievement of sustainability
- Rating free running building
- Rating Index
- Occupancy scenario
- Accuracy of HERS

== See also ==
- Home energy rating
- Leadership in Energy and Environmental Design
- Energy World
- Energy Performance Certificate (United Kingdom) – Scheme for rating the energy efficiency of buildings
- National Energy Foundation
- Energy Star
- Energy efficiency in British housing
- Green building
- National Energy Foundation
- International Energy Agency
