= EnerGuide =

Canadian Regulatory Mark for energy efficiency

EnerGuide is the official mark of the Government of Canada for its energy performance rating and labeling program for key consumer items—houses, light-duty vehicles, and certain energy-using products.

The EnerGuide efficiency percent is calculated by dividing the power output by power input. EnerGuide labelling exists for appliances, heating and cooling equipment, houses and vehicles.

EnerGuide includes a house energy evaluation, including tests to find air leakage and the energy efficiency of its heating. It was designed to help Canadians reduce their greenhouse gas emissions and to save energy. To accomplish the same goals for new home construction the EnerGuide for New Houses program was initiated in 2006.

The new Saskatchewan EnerGuide for Houses program is active from April 1, 2011 to October 31, 2013.

== EnerGuide for New Houses ==
The EnerGuide for New Houses program, a sister program of EnerGuide for Houses, helps Canadians plan and build new homes that are cost-effective and energy efficient, that lower greenhouse gas emissions and save energy.

In addition to evaluating the design trade-offs that affect the annual energy usage of the home it is also a ranking system. The EnerGuide for Houses scale goes from 0-100 with 0 being the least efficient and 100 being the most energy efficient. In 2005 the average home in Canada had a rating of 66 on the EnerGuide scale. By comparison a home built to the R-2000 standard has a rating of 80.

The steps involved for the EnerGuide for New Houses process are:

1. The EnerGuide for New Houses service starts with an analysis of the new house plans selected by the pending home owner by an EnerGuide for New Houses energy advisor.
2. The advisor recommends energy-saving upgrades and works with the builder to develop a report that lists various cost-effective options.
3. The builder then estimates the upgrade work and provides the client with a price.
4. When construction is done, the EnerGuide advisor verifies the applied energy upgrades and performs a blower door test.
5. After the data has been collected, the home receives its EnerGuide for New Houses rating.
6. The home owner is provided an official label to display the rating on the home’s furnace or electrical box.

== See also ==
- Energy audit
- House Energy Rating – Standard measure of the energy efficiency of a building
- National Home Energy Rating – United Kingdom measurement of a home's energy efficiency
- Home energy rating
