= Home Energy Rating =

United States measurement of a home's energy efficiency

The Home Energy Rating is an American estimated measurement of a home's energy efficiency based on normalized modified end-use loads (nMEULs). In the United States, the Residential Energy Services Network (RESNET) is responsible for creation and maintenance of the RESNET Mortgage Industry National Home Energy Rating Standards (MINHERS), a proprietary system of standards, which includes standards language for the certification and quality assurance for RESNET Provider organizations. RESNET is an EPA recognized Home Certification Organization (HCO) that also help's create standards in compliance with the American National Standards Institute, namely ANSI 301, ANSI 310, ANSI 380, and ANSI 850. The Building Science Institute, Ltd. Co. (BSI) is another EPA recognized HCO that maintains the ANSI Standards to produce Energy Ratings and compliance with above-code programs such as the ENERGY STAR New Homes Program.

Home energy ratings can be used for either existing homes or new homes. A home energy rating of an existing home allows a homeowner to receive a report listing options for upgrading a home's energy efficiency. The homeowners may then use the report to determine the most effective ways in which to upgrade the home's energy efficiency. A home energy rating of a new home allows buyers to compare the energy efficiency of homes they are considering buying.

== History of home energy ratings in the United States ==
In the 1970s, multiple state energy offices created systems to quantify and communicate the energy efficiency of homes. Oftentimes, these systems were tied to state-based financial incentives, like rate buy-downs. Through the 1980s, these home energy rating systems spread. However, each state's home energy rating system were independent from the others and it was a patchwork of requirements. In the Energy Policy Act of 1992, the Congress directed the U.S. Department of Energy to pursue the development of a uniform home energy rating system. In partnership with the HERS Council, they produced a two versions of a national standard and laid the groundwork for a national home energy rating system. This work was repurposed by RESNET in 2002, after subsuming the parent organization, Energy Rated Homes of America.

== Usage ==
A home energy rating can be used to estimate the energy efficiency of a home compared to a reference home built to the 2006 IECC Standards or estimate the efficiency of a home that is being constructed or improved. A home energy rating of a home prior to construction or improvement is called a “projected rating”. A home energy rating that is used to determine a home's as-built estimated energy efficiency is referred to as a “confirmed rating". A home energy rating that is generated through an accepted sampling procedure is called a "sampled rating". A home energy rating that receives verification for all required minimum rated features but relies on threshold values for tested features is called a "threshold rating".

Energy assessments take into account different climatic zones in different parts of the country and are benchmarked according to average household energy consumption particular to a given climatic region.

== Energy Rating Index and related scales ==
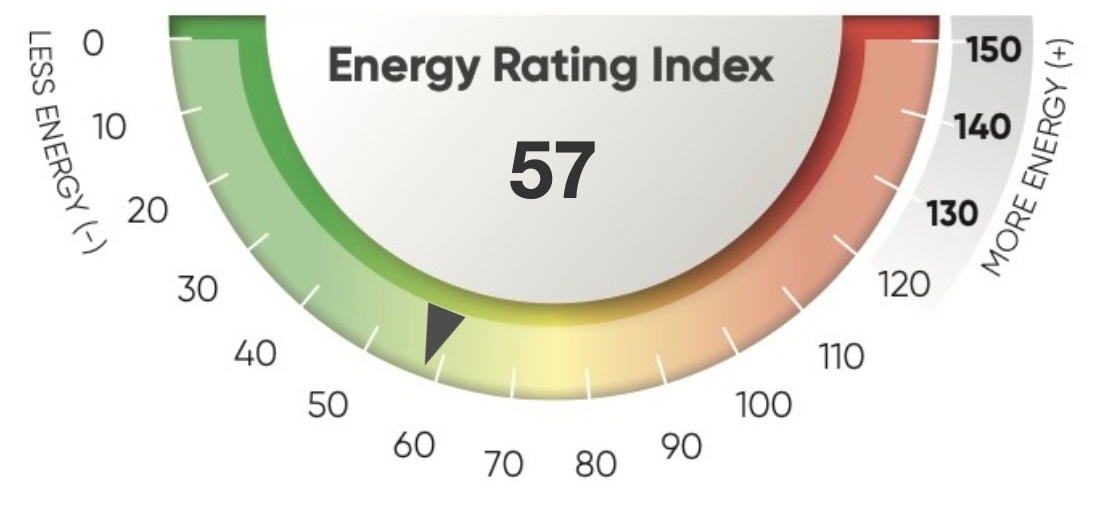
Sample Energy Rating Index Scale

Home energy ratings provide a relative energy use index called the Energy Rating Index (ERI). An Index of 100 represents the estimated energy performance equivalent to a home built to the 2006 IECC standards, which is known as the reference home. An Index of 0 (zero) indicates that the building uses no net purchased energy (a Zero Energy Building). The lower the value, the better.

For capitalizing a building's energy performance in the mortgage loan, certification of “White Tags” for private financial investors, and by the US government for verification of building energy performance for such programs as federal tax incentives, the United States Environmental Protection Agency’s Energy Star program and the U.S. Department of Energy’s Building America Program.

The ERI Index is the only EnergyStar accepted index. However there are derivative calculations that include the RESNET-proprietary HERS Index which is modified by RESNET's MINHERS Standards. RESNET has publicly stated that the HERS Index modifies the ANSI Standards for their proprietary HERS Ratings.

Additional ERI variants are modified by different iterations of the International Code Council (ICC) energy code. Typically differences include changes to mechanical ventilation, or seasonal/hourly calculation methods for modeling a buildings energy use.

The "seasonal" option calculates energy performance based on typical weather patterns for each season of the year. This method assumes that the building's energy use is consistent with the average energy use for buildings in that region during that season. The "hourly" option, on the other hand, calculates energy performance based on hourly weather data for the entire year. This method takes into account variations in energy use due to changes in weather conditions throughout the year, and may be more accurate for buildings with complex energy systems or for buildings located in areas with extreme weather conditions.

The HERS Index replaced the earlier "HERS Score", which ran in the opposite direction: The higher the value, the better. In 2009, the U.S. Department of Energy presented a new scale, the "EnergySmart Home Scale (E-Scale)", "based on" the HERS Score, apparently simply by subtracting the HERS Index from 100. In this new scale, higher values correspond again to better performance. The U.S. Department of Energy then transitioned this into the Home Energy Score, a complete home energy rating system with separate providers and software tools from both RESNET and BSI.

As of March 2022, a Carbon Index measurement has been added to ANSI 301-2019 through Addendum D-2022.

== Projected and confirmed ratings ==
Projected ratings give home owners and builders an estimate of what a home's estimated efficiency will be like after construction or improvements, so that they may determine the most cost-effective route to improve a building's efficiency. A confirmed rating, which indicates the home's as-built estimated efficiency, requires an inspection of the home from an energy field verifier. The energy field verifier reviews the home to identify its energy characteristics, such as insulation levels, window efficiency, wall-to-window ratios, the heating and cooling system efficiency, the solar orientation of the home, and the water heating system. Performance testing, such as a blower door test for air leakage, outside and total duct leakage, and mechanical ventilation testing is usually part of the rating.

Confirmed, Sampled, and Threshold Ratings that are built above code requirements are registered with public databases such as the RESNET Registry and the BSI Registry.

== Types of verifiers ==
In order to provide certified Energy Ratings to rating clients such as builders or homeowners, individuals must become a Certified Rater through an EPA recognized HCO and have attended and successfully completed an EPA-recognized training class.

Under RESNET's MINHERS, the process of becoming a Certified HERS Rater includes the following:

- Training: HERS Rater candidates shall attend a HERS Rater training course presented by a RESNET-accredited Training Provider, either in-person or through self paced online programs. Upon completion of the HERS Rater training course, candidates must pass the RESNET Standard Rater exam, the RESCAZ Simulation Exam, and the RESNET Rater Simulation Practical Examination. The tests are open book and open note.
- Mentorship: After successful completion of the HERS Rater training course and three exams, the candidate must sign a contract with a RESNET Rating Provider in order to be mentored through five Probationary ratings. The Probationary Rater shall complete these ratings under the supervision and direction of the Provider. Upon successful completion of all three Probationary ratings, and any other requirements outlined by the Provider, the individual will become a Certified HERS Rater.
- Certification and Professional Development: HERS Raters must maintain their certification by obtaining 18 RESNET-approved Professional Development Hours (PDHs) in a 3-year period. PDHs may be earned by attending individual training sessions offered by RESNET Training Providers or attending the RESNET Building Performance Conference.

Under BSI's Building Science Education Training & Certification System Process 02, prior to credentialing, candidates must successfully complete the following:

- Training programs through Building Science Education: ICC-approved Plans Examiner/Energy Code Inspector, ANSI/RESNET/ICC 301-2019, ANSI/RESNET/ICC 380-2019, ANSI/RESNET/ACCA 310-2020, ANSI/ACCA 12-2018, Energy Modeling, and HouseRater training (approximately 80+ hours of training). Upon completion of the ICC Plans Examiner/Energy Code Inspector training, candidates must pass the ICC-proctored Plans Examiner/Energy Code Inspector Exam.
- Mentorship: 10 energy models of different dwelling unit types, 5 pre-drywall / insulation verifications, and 5 final verifications. All of these must be completed under the mentorship of BSI-credentialed Quality Assessors or Quality Assessment Designees
- Professional Development: All individuals credentialed by the Building Science Institute must complete 6 hours of continuing education per calendar year to maintain their credential. Both organizations have additional certification levels to perform solely field inspection or energy modeling duties.

Please note, some States (such as Texas) have additional requirements for individuals who perform code compliance activities. This includes additional certification(s) from the International Code Council and related organizations, which the HERS Rater certification does not comply with. In order to participate in above-code programs like the ENERGY STAR Program, Certified Raters through RESNET or BSI must complete additional training and exams.

== Quality management of energy ratings ==
Energy Ratings are required to receive quality oversight from EPA approved HCO's, such as RESNET and BSI.

RESNET's MINHERS grants the authority of individual companies, called Rating Providers or QA Providers to offer this oversight internally or with 3rd parties. These organizations are required to have RESNET-certified Quality Assurance Designees contracted or on staff to perform a minimum of 10% review of rating files (energy models) submitted for certification by a Rater annually. Additionally, QA Providers must perform on-site field QA on 1% of ratings submitted by a Rater annually. RESNET requires these QA Providers submit annual packages verifying their QA work complies with RESNET standards, which are reviewed by RESNET Staff members. On an annual basis, RESNET also performs field quality assurance audits on 25% of QA Providers, and 50% of QA Providers receive a file quality assurance audit.

BSI performs quality management oversight activities through automated activities in HouseRater, manual review of all projects submitted prior to registration, and annual organization reviews according to American Society for Quality (ASQ) guidelines. Verification Organizations contracted through BSI can perform quality management internally, provided the Quality Assessors are properly credentialed by BSI and do not conflict with the Structural Requirements for Verification Organizations.

== Criticisms ==
Home energy rating systems in the United States are not without concerns regarding the ethical practices of the companies and the variability of the outputs generated by the rating companies.

As early as 2014, researchers from Proctor Engineering discovered wide variations between 6 HERS Raters. They found between 12% and 48% difference in the HERS Index depending on the home. A later study in 2018, funded by the U.S. Department of Energy and performed by regional energy efficiency organizations, found variations in the HERS Index. The average variation was 13 points, with a project in Portland having a range of 6 HERS Index points and a project in Denver having a range of 32 HERS Index points.

Additionally, the U.S. Department of Justice released a statement in 2023 about a RESNET-accredited QA Provider, SkyeTec (owned by SMC Systems). The allegations in the settlement agreement include failing to perform required inspections but still certifying homes with the ENERGY STAR program.

== See also ==
- Building information modeling – Process for digital management of built assets
- EnerGuide – Canadian Regulatory Mark for energy efficiency
- Energy audit – Inspection, survey and analysis of energy flows in a building
- ENERGY STAR – US EPA program and certification
- Leadership in Energy and Environmental Design – Standard for green building design
- Low-energy house – House designed for reduced energy use
- National Green Building Standard – American environmental certification program
- National Home Energy Rating
- Nationwide House Energy Rating Scheme – Australian thermal performance for residential homes
- Passive House – High-performance energy-efficiency building standard
