= Green building in Bangladesh =

Bangladesh is one of the most vulnerable nations in the world due to climate change. As the ninth most populous country and twelfth most densely populated countries in the world, its rising population and limited land space have put tremendous strains on the urban ecosystem. The capital of Dhaka itself underwent severe transformations in recent years to catch up the increased rate of urbanisation. This change was paralleled by a boom in the real estate, construction and housing industry. According to United Nations Population Fund (UNFPA), Dhaka is one of the most polluted cities in the world.

Unified measures have been adopted from the national community in an effort to avoid further man made calamities due to climate change and higher emissions. There are six main sectors most likely to be affected by climate change in Bangladesh – water resources and coastal zones, infrastructure and human settlements, agriculture and food security, forestry and biodiversity, fisheries, and human health. Deforestation has resulted in several man made disasters in the country's history. Green buildings assure efficient usage of water and energy and the nation is struggling in the production of electricity and suffering from a shortage of water.

The First Government Green Building Initiative was taken by the Housing and Building Research Institute in 2007 The Eco-Housing Project designed by Ar. Md Nafizur Rahman. With the support of IFC-world bank the HBRI Drafted the Guideline for Gren Building Code in 2012, in the same year a new chapter on Energy Efficiency and Sustainability was included in BNBC. The Building Energy Efficiency and Environment Rating (BEEER) System for Bangladesh has been Drafted by Md. Nafizur Rahman in 2018 for the Sustainable and Renewable Energy Authority(SREDA). At31 March 2024 the BEEER has been approved by the Government. Ar. Nafiz has also developed another Green Building Rating System "Green Affordable Resilience Certification for Habitats (GreenARCH) for The Housing and Building Research Institute. The Bangladesh Bank with te support of SREDA also created a point-based rating system "Green Building Features" for their Refinancing scheme in 2017. In the private sector, the first green building in Bangladesh was by EPIC group in May 2011. Since 2008, Sustainable Built Environment Initiative – Bangladesh (later Bangladesh Green Building Council) founder, Sanwar Azam had worked to unify the stake holders towards a greener country, saying that with growing population in a diminishing land and rapid urbanisation to major cities, 'Going green' had become a marketing ploy for various organisations as there were no quantifiable way to judge a structures sustainability. He offered a centralised board to offer Leadership in Energy and Environmental Design (LEED) certifications to interested projects and firms. In addition, he proposed a similar voluntary building rating tool that is much cheaper to attain and one that is much suited to the socio-economic conditions of the country and relevant to its building environment and construction culture.

Azam also stressed the need for educational programs in sustainable designs and various universities in Bangladesh planned to promote Green Building principles in their curriculum, such as in the Bangladesh University of Engineering and Technology, State University of Bangladesh-SUB, North South University, BRAC University and Asia Pacific University. Dr. Saleh Uddin was the Events and Education Committee of Bangladesh Green Building Council. Citing that in cramped environment, such buildings and structures would be far more comfortable and satisfying but most importantly directly address some national issues, like conserving water and energy. The Government of Bangladesh in 2009 stopped giving connections to newly constructed buildings meaning that new homes would not have access to energy, and even water due to shortages. Experts agreed that a rating tool would not only facilitate government incentives to sustainable communities but achieve the six-point goals of the National Water Policy of 1999 by the World Bank as well as the Renewable Energy Policy of 2008 by the Ministry of Power and Energy.

In an event with Architecture and construction experts, he urged for a national need for sustainable development in the nation's growing building industry and brought a forum together to act as the national GBC of Bangladesh. He stressed reductions of carbon emissions from buildings. National and international energy companies like Energpac and Siemens attended the event to assess the roles of the corporate stakeholders while United Nations Framework Convention on Climate Change (UNFCCC) and Intergovernmental Panel on Climate Change (IPCC) fellows commented on the global imperative of such an initiative. The first proposed rating tool aimed to fulfill the seventh target from the United Nations' Millennium Development Goals (MDGs), as for the first time the council provided support for green building certifications. Initially with minimal government support, the plan was to transform the market with cost effective steps. In another interview with The Independent, Sanwar said "there is a great misconception regarding the cost effectiveness of the green design and construction," and that increased productivity and energy savings of a green building outweighs initial costs. About the feasibility of widespread utilisation of LEED certifications, he said that it is very expensive and the Bangladesh is in the process of developing a green building rating system in the regional context. These activities were also promoted by national and region experts. Prominent national award-winning architects such as Mustapha Khalid Palash, the 2010 Holcim Green Built Sustainable Design Competition winner was the Chairman of the Practicing Professionals Committee, and Rafiq Azam, defined BGBC platform as a way for Bangladesh to define 'Green' according to the national circumstances. The Institute of Architects Bangladesh, which works with different government organisation to offer education and government advocacy commented on the adaptability of sustainable principles in the national architecture community in the form of the BGBC rating tool.

In 2011, BGBC founder pointed out that such green building standards and tools will lead to conservation as buildings would less consumption of electricity and water, and also 'the need for reduction of carbon emissions' in the current building and construction scenario. At the same meeting, the Additional Chief Architect of the Ministry of Housing and Public Works, Bangladesh spoke about the government's role. By 2012, the Ministry of Public Works began working with the World Bank to study energy and water efficiency and emissions reductions through Green Building Codes.

== See also ==
- Green building in South Africa
- Green building in Australia
- Green building in the United States
- Green building in New Zealand
- Green building in India
- Green building in Israel
- Green building in Germany
- Green building in Mexico
- Green building in the United Kingdom
