= Public schemes for energy efficient refurbishment =

Incentives for 'green' renovation of buildings

Public plans for energy efficient refurbishment are put in place by states to encourage building owners to renovate their properties in a way that increases their energy performance. As financing represents the most important obstacle to this type of renovation, the plans favour financial incentives in the form of loans or grants. Various institutions can be involved in the process, such as ministries, banks, firms, or energy services companies (ESCOs).

A number of countries have implemented such plans: the United States, France, Belgium, Germany, the United Kingdom, Australia, Estonia, and others.

== United States: PACE ==
The concept of PACE (Property-Assessed Clean Energy) was inspired by "solar bonds" program implemented in San Francisco in 2001. It was meant to overcome the major barrier to the installation of solar and energy efficiency retrofits in commercial or residential properties: high up-front costs. The principle consisted in "on-tax bill solar and efficiency financing," whereby repayment of the investment in measures is made through a property tax assessment.

PACE originated in 2008 with pilot programs in California, Colorado, and New York, that focused primarily on energy efficiency upgrades to single family homes. The first actual PACE program was carried out in Berkeley, California, and the state passed the first PACE-enabling legislation in 2008.

In the midst of the 2008 financial crisis, on July 30, 2008, the Federal Housing Finance Agency (FHFA) was created to supervise enterprises and banks (the "regulated entities"), after Fannie Mae (the Federal National Mortgage Association) and Freddie Mac (the Federal Home Loan Mortgage Association)'s bankruptcy. At the time, most homes had a market value below the volume of contracted loans, following the burst of the housing bubble. In July 2010, the FHFA issued the first of many directives that effectively ban Fannie Mae and Freddie Mac from buying or holding mortgages with PACE assessments. PACE therefore shifted its focus over the next year toward commercial, industrial, multi-family and agricultural buildings and properties.

PACENow, is a national advocate for PACE, defines its mission as "to promote and assist the development of PACE programs by state and local governments and provide leadership and support for a growing universe of energy efficiency and PACE stakeholders."

PACE funding is provided (using various sources) or arranged by local governments for 100% of a project's cost, and is repaid with an assessment over a term of up to 20 years.

== Germany - KfW Bankengruppe ==
=== Context and creation ===
KfW (Kreditanstalt für Wiederaufbau, meaning Reconstruction Credit Institute) is a German government-owned development bank, based in Frankfurt. The bank was created in 1948 after the Second World War as part of the Marshall Plan for the reconstruction of Europe.

The KfW Förderbank (KfW promotional bank) is today its largest business unit, committed to housing and environmental protection. KfW introduced the Efficiency House Standard in 2009, to identify levels of energy efficiency in houses and provide loans or grants accordingly. Its activities devoted to bringing down CO_{2} emissions align with a strategy designed by the Federal Ministry of Economics and Technology (BMWi) in 2010, following the decision to speed up the pace of nuclear energy phase-out. This strategy outlined the directions to be privileged in the following years to achieve the desired level of energy efficiency. Among others, it asked to significantly raise the efficiency standards for buildings, to increase funds available for building improvement, and to implement tools to help ensure that new buildings gradually comply with the futureEuropean standards for nearly zero energy buildings. The KfW created promotional programmes targeting private buyers and homeowners, landlords and housing companies, to support refurbishment of older residential buildings with grants or loans.

=== Goals and missions ===
The German government announced in its "Energy Concept" strategy that it aims at reducing CO_{2} emissions by 80% in 2050 (the base year is 1990). Between 1990 and 2010, annual CO_{2} emissions have fallen at an average annual growth rate of -1.1%. This rate is not large enough to reach the 80% reduction goal; emissions should decrease at a rate of 3.4% per year from now on.

The most important sector contributing to CO_{2} emissions is the production and distribution of energy and water (42% of total emissions), and the second-most important one is that of private households (22%). The government has thus decided that efforts must be focused on two pillars: increased energy efficiency in existing buildings, and a larger share of renewable electricity. In order to ensure a reduction of energy consumption in existing buildings, it has decided to promote their rehabilitation, and has committed to carrying out thermal retrofits on 2% of the building stock each year. The realization of these goals is precisely what KfW's promotional programs are targeting.

=== Intervention methods ===
The bank has set six levels of promotional incentives for energy efficiency refurbishment activities, expressed as Efficiency House Standards 55, 70, 85, 100, 115, and "Monument". These numbers represent the energy consumption of the housing unit as a percentage of the maximum primary energy requirement specified by the Energy Conservation Ordinance (EnEV). The lower the rating, the greater the energy efficiency. For example, a "KfW Efficiency House 70" consumes 70% of this requirement. As such, the best standard (55) receives the greatest support. To meet the energy standard for an efficient home, heating systems, thermal wall insulation, roof and floor insulation and windows are required. Promotional funds are available either through a loan, or through a grant.

The involvement of an energy consultant is mandatory in the application process, and must be contracted by the applicant himself.

==== Supplementary Credit ====
The "KfW Energy Efficient Renovation - Supplementary Credit" programme offers low interest loans specifically for the replacement of the heating and domestic hot water systems that were installed before 2009. The loans can be up to €50,000, and have a 10-year maturity at a fixed interest rate.

==== BAFA Energiesparberatung (Energy saving advice) ====
The Federal Office of Economics and Export Control (BAFA) offers grants in certain situations to cover expenses in on-site energy consultancy in residential buildings (on-site consulting). The maximum grant cannot exceed 50% of the total gross cost of the consultation.

=== Financial arrangements ===
KfW obtains its funding on the capital markets, where it benefits from an AAA credit rating and a 100% guarantee from the German government. It obtains around €80 billion annually on the international capital markets. KfW thus provides refinancing loans to commercial banks at advantageous rates. KfW does not lend directly to individuals; loans have to go through commercial banks. The interest rate for the promotional loans distributed by the commercial banks is further subsidized by funds provided by the Federal Ministry of Building, Transport and Urban Development. KfW also receives additional funding from the "Energy and Climate fund", used to finance the preferential loans and the grants. Grants are distributed directly by KfW to individuals.

=== Business plan and results ===
In 2012, KfW Group had dedicated €29.2 billion to its "Climate change and environment" department, making it its largest activity and its core priority. The latest data on the KfW programs' achievements shows positive results: between 2006 and 2012, the programs led to an average reduction of 5.9 Mt CO_{2} equivalents per year.

More specifically on KfW's refurbishment programmes, the commitment volume in 2012 was €10.1 billion, and financed investments amounted to €27.3 billion. Still in 2012, 240,000 housing units were refurbished to higher energy efficiency levels, and 116,000 new energy efficient housing units were built.

In terms of energy conservation, the energy use in newly retrofitted buildings has decreased from approximately 120 kWh per square meter per annum to 80 kWh/sm/p.a.

==== International opening ====
In 2010, the KfW entered into a partnership with the Small Industries Development Bank of India (SIDBI), whereby the KfW provided a dedicated credit line of €50 Million to finance energy efficiency projects in micro, small and medium enterprises in India. The aim is to encourage MSMEs (Micro Small and Medium Enterprises) to undertake energy-saving investments in plant and machinery, and in production processes. KfW has also provided technical assistance to help SIDBI identify key MSME clusters, set up the financing streams, and conduct awareness campaigns.

=== Macroeconomic effects ===
A study on the macroeconomic effects of the German government's building rehabilitation programs has been conducted to assess the impact from the investment projects on the public revenue, the housing industry and the climate policy. The analysis focused on short-term effects (the effects taking place in the corresponding year). For the years 2008, 2009 and 2010, the analysis took into account the program cost (the opportunity cost of providing funds for the KfW promotional programs instead of using them elsewhere), and calculated the revenues from the value added tax paid by investors, net taxes on products, net taxes on production, payroll tax and SSC (Social Security Contributions) including solidarity surcharge, corporate income tax, and other income taxes including solidarity surcharge. Because it is not clear whether the additional demand for labour is met through overtime work or through additional jobs, the analysis provides two scenarios; one named "overtime", where the demand impulse does not create additional jobs, and the second named "jobs", where the opposite is true. In the latter, the avoided cost of unemployment is added as a revenue.

In any scenario, results clearly show that the public revenue has been positively impacted by the investment projects.

- In 2008, the program cost amounted to €1,293 million. In the scenario "overtime", the net effect on the public budget (public revenue minus program cost) was €1,478 million. In the scenario "jobs", the avoided cost of unemployment equals €857 million, and the net effect is thus €2,335 million.
- In 2009, which was the year of the "Great Recession", when the KfW programs were used as a means to increase aggregate demand, the program cost amounted to €2,035 million. In the scenario "overtime", the net effect was €3,326 million, and in the scenario "jobs", it was €5,937 million.
- In 2010, the program cost was much lower than in 2009, amounting to €1,366 million. In the scenario "overtime", the net effect was €3,987 million, and in the scenario "jobs", it was €5,810 million, quite similar to the year 2009.

The conclusion from this study is three-fold: first, KfW promotional programs result in important energy use and emissions reduction. Not only is this environmentally valuable, it also helps to reduce Germany's import dependence on manufacturing and energy sources. Second, the programs strengthen the demand for labour-intensive activities such as construction services, thereby reducing unemployment. Finally, the net effect of the programs on the public budget is undeniably positive, as a weighing of program costs against induced revenues shows.

== Estonia: KredEx ==
The KredEx scheme was designed based on the German federal bank (KfW) model, a pioneer in the use of a revolving fund to finance energy efficient building renovation.

The success of the KredEx scheme relies mainly on the political impetus it was given at the time of its creation. This allowed to raise a considerable amount of funding from the EU Structural Funds, a first in Europe for this type of program.

The political impetus also allowed for the development of a legal framework propitious to the distribution of funds under preferential terms, to widen adoption of the program by end beneficiaries.

Apartment building associations who wish to undertake renovation works must undertake an energy audit in order to apply for the loan or grant. It is their responsibility to contract construction companies and supervisors for the works (who check that the works respect the terms of the loan).

The proposed loans are advantageous in their longer maturity (up to 20 years), lower interest rates (from 4.3%), and rates fixed for a period of 10 years. Grants are available for those who wish to undertake more comprehensive refurbishment. The combination of grants and loans has proven beneficial: grants motivate project adoption, and long term favourable loans are needed to make the investment accessible. Expected energy savings are way above the level that was initially set as a target.

=== Context and creation ===
Estonia is one of the most attractive country in Eastern Europe in terms of FDI (Foreign Direct Investment), thanks to a high credit rating (A), low labour costs, a modern technological infrastructure, and favourable regulatory and tax policies. Environmental policy is designed by the Ministry of Environment, whereas energy policy is managed by the Ministry of Economic Affairs and Communications.

Under the EU's burden-sharing agreement for reduction of CO_{2} emissions, Estonia was mandated to reduce greenhouse gases by 8% over 1990 values between 2008 and 2012. Energy efficiency in buildings is a high priority for the Estonian Government: 60% of housing was built between 1960 and 1990, around 95% is privately owned, and 75% of the population lives in multi-apartment buildings.

KredEx was created in 2001 to help Estonian companies develop, raise finance, and expand their exports. Another aim was to support the upgrade and renovation of domestic housing, and its primary focus has gradually shifted to the development of financial products that support retrofit of apartment buildings. It provides various financial products, such as loans and loan guarantees, as well as grants for renovation, efficiency audits and evaluations.

=== Legal status and nature of partnerships ===
KredEx is a state-owned credit and export guarantee fund (not a public bank), created in 2001 by the Ministry of Economic Affairs and Communications as a not-for-profit entity. Sureties and guarantees issued by KredEx are fully backed by a state guarantee. It was established as a body governed by private law, operating in the public interest according to State policies.

KredEx works as a revolving fund that, among other activities, supports financing of energy efficiency projects. It has received loans from the Council of Europe Development Bank (CEB) to undertake measures aimed at complying with the council's Directive 2002/91/EC on the energy performance of buildings. KredEx also receives funding from the European Regional Development Fund (ERDF).

Important other stakeholders in the program include the commercial banks Swedbank and SEB, which get favourable funding from KredEx and make loans to apartment building associations. Their main motivation to take part in the program was to get access to more clients, especially at the beginning of the financial crisis. They have also had very good experiences with financing energy refurbishment of buildings prior to 2009.

KredEx also works in cooperation with some international bodies, in particular other state-owned financial institutions: in 2007, it signed a Memorandum of Understanding with KfW Bankengruppe (Germany), BGK (Poland), and Hipotēku Banka (Latvia), on the structuring and implementation of large financing programmes to promote energy efficiency in housing, for which KfW provided advice.

=== Goals and missions ===
The KredEx scheme aims to motivate apartment building owners to reduce energy consumption and increase the energy efficiency of their homes by providing preferential loans and grants under certain conditions. In 2009, the stated goal was to renovate at least 1,000 buildings within the framework of the following years in order to deem the program successful. The targeted energy savings are of approximately 30% for renovated buildings.

=== Financial arrangements ===
Since 2003, KredEx has been committed to supporting energy efficiency through loans and grants. Until 2007, KredEx has worked under a simple grant scheme. For energy audits, building designs and technical expertise, up to 50% of the costs are provided in grants; this part of the scheme is still continuing today. For renovation, up to 10% of the costs were provided through grants; through this scheme, KredEx achieved renovation of 3,200 buildings, for an amount of €11 Million. The problems with this approach were insufficient funding, limitation to "single works", and the fact that grants are only available after payments (building owners had to provide the entirety of up-front costs).

KredEx therefore shifted to a revolving fund approach, to widen the opportunities for refurbishment of buildings, receive greater financial support from the state, and reduce administration costs.

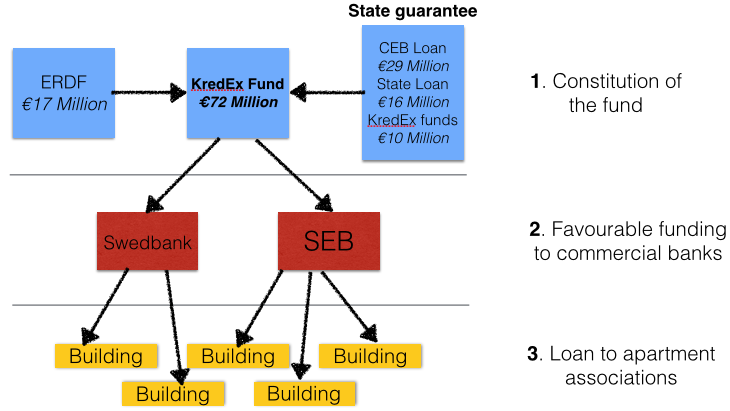
The KredEx Revolving Fund

In 2010, Estonia became the first country to channel EU Structural Funds into apartment buildings renovation programs:

- The Council of Europe Development Bank (CEB) provided a loan of €29 Million, at very interesting rates.
- The European Regional Development Fund (ERDF) disbursed €17 Million to the fund.

In 2009, the Fund amounted to €49 Million. Progressively, KredEx added up to €10 Million to the Fund from its profits. In 2013, the Estonian State provided a loan of €16 Million to KredEx, and the capital was increased to €72.6 Million.

The Fund is used to offer preferential loans for building refurbishment, distributed through two commercial banks, Swedbank and SEB Estonia. The advantages of the loans disbursed through the banks are:

- Longer maturity (20 years instead of an average of 11.8 years)
- Lower interest rates (4.3-4.8% instead of 7-10%)
- Rates fixed for longer periods (10 years instead of 5, or even variable rates)

=== Intervention methods ===
The renovation loan programme was developed by KredEx, together with the KfW (Germany), and the Ministry of Economic Affairs and Communications. Apartment Building Renovation Loans, introduced in 2009, are available for apartment buildings constructed before 1993. Loans cannot be applied for by individual homeowners. Only apartment associations, building associations and communities of apartment owners in buildings with at least 3 apartments are eligible.

The main terms for the loans are as follows:

- Achievement of energy saving of at least 20% in apartment buildings of 2000m^{2}
- Achievement of energy saving of at least 30% in apartment buildings of over 2000m^{2}
- Loan period of up to 20 years
- Self-financing of at least 15%, can be covered by reconstruction grant
- Minimum loan amount: €6,400 per apartment building, up to 64 EUR/m^{2} or the maximum amount according to the apartment building's solvency

Aside from loans, grants are also available to help finance the independent energy audit (including monitoring after the renovation) and project design documents. It can be used to decrease the share of self-financing, or by apartment buildings constructed after 1993 (which do not belong to the renovation loan target group of KredEx) to be combined with a regular loan. The goal of the grant scheme is to motivate building owners to achieve complete renovation of the buildings, without leaving important energy saving measures aside. The grants are distributed in the amount of 15%, 25% and 35% of the total project cost, depending on the level of energy savings achieved, under the following conditions:

15% Grant

- Fulfill the terms for renovation loan
- Energy saving 20 or 30%, according to the size of the building (see terms of the loans)
- Energy label E, energy consumption below 250 kWh/m^{2}

25% Grant

- Roof, facade, windows, heating system have to be included in the renovations
- Energy saving of at least 40%
- Energy label D, energy consumption below 200 kWh/m^{2}

35% Grant

- Roof, facade, windows, heating system, and heat-recovery ventilation have to be included in the renovations
- Energy saving of at least 50%
- Energy label C, energy consumption below 150 kWh/m^{2}

=== Implementation and operations ===
Application for the renovation loan has to be made through Swedbank or SBE.

Prior to making the application, building owners must contract an energy auditor themselves, and put together the required documents (energy audit, energy consumption reports, construction bids...) on their own. KredEx thus comes in after the applicants' process of making the decision to renovate and of forming the project (the budget has to be all set out before the application is made). After a loan and/or grant is approved, it is the building owner's responsibility to find a construction company that will undertake the renovation works, and to contract a supervisor that will make sure loan terms are respected.

=== Business plan and results ===
Number of renovations: When the KredEx fund was launched in 2009, the objective was to finance at least 1,000 buildings. By the end of 2013, 798 buildings were renovated. 415 buildings used reconstruction grant and KredEx soft loan, 185 buildings used only KredEx loan, and 198 buildings used only reconstruction grant.

Average amounts: The average loan amount in 2011 was €100,000, the average self-financing was 27.9% and the average length of loan period was 15.2 years. In terms of grants, the average amount in 2011 was €26,192.

Energy savings: For apartment loans, the average predicted savings achieved with the reconstruction work is 39.3%, way above the initial targets of 20 or 30%. This saving relates to an after-works consumption of 75 GWh per year on average.

== Australia - 1200 Buildings ==
=== Context and creation ===
The City of Melbourne is one of the most innovative cities in Australia in terms of sustainability, and has been devoted for many years to reducing its carbon footprint.

In 2002, the City published Zero Net Emissions by 2020 - A Roadmap to a Climate Neutral City, setting an ambitious target. The strategy is backed by innovative projects such as 1200 Buildings, launched in 2010, aimed at the energy efficient refurbishment of commercial (non-residential) buildings. As stated by 1200 Buildings' targets, "fifty percent of the municipality's greenhouse gas emissions are generated by the commercial sector. If commercial buildings improve their energy efficiency by approximately 38 percent, 383,000 tonnes of greenhouse gas emissions (CO_{2}-e) will be eliminated per year".

1200 Buildings published a survey report in 2013 to assess the evolution of the program and its results, drawing a picture of the rate and type of retrofitting achieved, and listing drivers and perceived barriers to the project. The report indicates successful, encouraging results in terms of the level of retrofit activity.

=== Legal status and nature of partnerships ===
To finance environmental retrofits, which is the key challenge in these initiatives, the City of Melbourne developed an innovative finance mechanism. It required an amendment to the City of Melbourne Act 2001 by the state Government of Victoria, enabling Melbourne to levy a new form of statutory charge, the Environmental Upgrade Finance. This new type of finance allows the City of Melbourne, in partnership with Australian financial institutions, to enter into voluntary environmental upgrade agreements with non-residential building owners to finance retrofitting of the buildings.

Environmental Upgrade Finance is available through the 1200 Buildings program, and is administered through the Sustainable Melbourne Fund on behalf of the City of Melbourne.

=== Goals and missions ===
As stated on the 1200 Buildings program's website, its aims are to:

- Eliminate 383,000 tonnes of CO_{2}-e per annum – equivalent to 7,660,000,000 "black balloons"
- Drive $2 billion of private sector reinvestment
- Create 8000 'green collar' jobs – engineers, environmental and sustainability consultants, builders, surveyors and many other industry professionals
- Stimulate Melbourne's economy during global recession
- Lead the way and demonstrate to the world that large-scale transformation can be achieved

1200 Buildings aims to retrofit about 70% of the commercial office buildings, which represents 1200 of them, whence the name of the program.

=== Financial arrangements ===
Environmental upgrade agreements are the cornerstone of 1200 Building's financial arrangements. An environmental upgrade agreement is a tripartite contract between a building owner, a bank and the City of Melbourne. When the agreement is established, the lending body (bank) forwards the retrofit loan to the owner. The City of Melbourne then collects the loan repayment through a rates charge (the amount funded is declared by the Melbourne City Council as an environmental upgrade charge), and finally passes it back to the bank. Council rates and charges take precedence over mortgages as charges against property. This means any debt owing to Council will take priority, thereby greatly reducing the risk for banks.

Conditions to be met before EUA is applied:

- Notify existing mortgage holder
- Tenants must opt-in
- Only non-residential buildings

According to 1200 Buildings, the benefits of using EUAs include:

- Fixed interest rates
- No re-financing required
- A repayment period of 10 years or more
- The loan stays with the property if the owner decides to sell

Owners have the option of sharing the cost with their tenants because Council rates and charges are generally passed through to tenants by the property owner under the terms of a net lease (the legislation requires that any such arrangement can only be made with the tenants' consent) → The objective is to overcome the split incentive barrier.

Three environmental upgrade agreements have been signed in Melbourne for projects with a total value of $5.6 million.

The first quarter of 2014 has seen significant changes in EUA legislation. New legislation will allow all councils in South Australia to initiate a Building Upgrade Finance program, similar to the City of Melbourne legislation, whereby the loan is tied to the property.

=== Intervention methods ===
The City of Melbourne oversees the projects. It mainly uses its website to promote the program, via examples of existing retrofits, lists of "big company" signatories, and case studies.

While the City accompanies building owners in their journey and can provide help at all steps of the project, owners are left on their own to undertake their energy audit, select and hire consultants and contractors, apply for permits... Therefore, planification, implementation, operations, updates and assessment are left to the charge of contractors, through tenders managed by the building owners themselves. Consultants and contractors can be architects, builders, commissioning agents, electrical engineers, energy auditors, energy performance contractors, environmentally sustainable design consultants, fire engineers, hydraulic engineers, installation contractors, mechanical engineers, and project managers.

The Energy Efficiency Council (EEC) is a body designed to help companies undertake energy efficiency measures, providing a platform for energy efficiency and cogeneration products and services, and is thus used by commercial building owners to find consultants and contractors. The council was formed in 2009, and incorporates the members and activities of the Australasian Energy Performance Contracting Alliance (AEPCA).

=== Implementation and operations ===
Once a commercial building owner is convinced to undertake retrofitting, the first step is for him to become a "signatory" of the project, by sending the Lord Mayor a signed copy of the "1200 Buildings Letter of commitment". The owner then selects a model for implementing its project:

- Energy Performance Contracting (EPC): an energy services company (ESCo) is hired to improve the energy efficiency of the building. A contract is signed between the building owner and the selected company, stating the level of energy savings guaranteed by the ESCo, the fee structure of the project and the duration of the project (a typical energy performance contract is four to ten years). The ESCo is paid from the guaranteed savings for the term of the contract. If the energy savings are not achieved, the ESCo is not paid. Once the work is completed and the contract has ended, the full savings are reverted to the owner. The energy services company acts as a project manager and is responsible for hiring, managing and paying the third parties required to carry out the works, meaning the building owner deals directly with one party rather than several. Once the works are finished, the building is monitored for the remainder of the EPC period and energy savings are verified and reported to all parties. The party that carries out the monitoring and verification should be nominated in the EPC. Monitoring and verification is usually carried out by the ESCo, though an independent third party can be used instead.
- Integrated Design: the building owner appoints a designer, who inspects the building and designs the changes to it, and selects a number of suitably qualified parties (building and installation contractors), who carry out the work under the supervision of a project manager. All parties are involved at the design stage. After a process of exchanging ideas among the different parties, the building owner signs a contract with the design consultant, agreeing to a schedule of works. Once the works are finished, a commissioning agent commissions and "fine tunes" the building systems to ensure they are working correctly. When the project is complete and the building back in use, ongoing maintenance is performed either by the installation contractor, the building's facility manager or a third party to ensure the design intent is realized.
- Design and construct: this model is similar to the integrated design model, except that design, installation and construction are all performed by the same party (installation contractors).

=== Business plan and results ===
According to the Melbourne Retrofit Survey 2013, between 2008 and 2013, 25% of Melbourne's commercial buildings had retrofitted or were currently undertaking a retrofit, indicating an acceleration of retrofit activity compared to 21% between 2006 and 2011. In 2013, 16% of the buildings surveyed claimed they were intending to undertake a retrofit within the next five years, a significant increase from the 10% in 2011. Most of the retrofits recently undertaken were self-funded (81%), and only 1% had used Environmental Upgrade Finance. 40% of owners surveyed declared they were "not at all interested" in Environmental Upgrade Finance. These numbers indicate a certain lack of interest in 1200 Buildings' financing mechanism, possibly caused by a lack of awareness or understanding of its benefits.

Still, the 1200 Buildings program counts 53 signatories to date, including "big name" corporations such as ING, Asia Pacific Group, Hilton, and Stockland. Four buildings have used Environmental Upgrade Agreements to access finance to retrofit, representing $5.6 million of investment and aiming to save 5660 tonnes carbon emissions and $491,000 in energy costs per year.

In March 2014, the Clean Energy Finance Corporation (CEFC) announced it will provide finance of up to $30 million for EUAs, bringing the total to a joint amount of $80 million allocated for EUAs.

== Belgium - Marshall Plan 2. Green ==
The Marshall Plan 2. Green was first developed and experimented in Wallonia, before being applied to the Brussels region.

=== Context and Creation ===
==== The Marshall Plan 2. Green ====
In August 2005, the Walloon Government adopted priority actions for the Walloon future: the Marshall Plan, gathering €1.2 billion.

After promising results, the Walloon Government renewed the initiative in 2009 through a "Marshall Plan 2. Green". The plan organizes around 6 pillars (human capital valorization, company network creation, scientific research support, quality jobs and activities creation, employment-environment alliances, social employment and well-being) and cross-cutting dynamics.

The Marshall Plan 2.Green gathers a total of €1.6 billion of conventional credit, to which €1.15 billion of alternative financing have been added. That is, almost €3 billion for the 2010-2014 time frame.

==== Employment-Environment Alliances (EEA) ====
The 5th pillar of the Marshall Plan 2. Green, Employment-Environment Alliances, focuses on the sustainable aspect of the development plan. Its objective, set in 2009, is to "support a new economic development model, sustainable and solidary, via employment-environment alliances constituting an opportunity in terms of employment, economic development, and environmental challenges. Positioning Wallonia as a sustainable development leader at the European and international levels, by developing a regarded expertise, while creating domestic employment."

The EEA is notably the first alliance with a "green construction" aspect. The Walloon housing sector is highly inefficient: nearly 44% of housing is badly isolated, and average energy consumption is 72% above the European average. The first measure aims at developing a multi-year plan for energy savings and sustainable construction, and a multi-sectorial contract. The objective is to "concentrate on the potential of energetic and environmental improvements of buildings to generate employment, create economic opportunities, increase training notably in sustainable construction jobs."

=== Legal Status and Partnerships ===
Various public and private decision makers, as well as concerned social partners and field actors are involved in the EEA. The Ministry of Sustainable Development is entrusted with EEA coordination. In February 2012, 41 multi-sectorial contracts have been signed with partners for the first Employment-Environment Alliance. Federations of construction companies, public interest and services organizations, unions, training operators, as well as groups and associations involved in sustainable development and construction participated in this process.

The 3 commitments of the multi-sectorial contracts signatory:

- The actor is associated as a partner in the implementation of the first EEA
- The actor states its adhesion to the 1st EEA's objectives
- The actor commits to contributing in the implementation of actions defined in the multi-sectorial contract

=== Goals and Missions ===
The first EEA's principal objective is to "concentrate on the potential of energetic and environmental improvements of buildings to generate employment, create economic opportunities, increase training notably in sustainable construction jobs." To do so, four dimensions are considered:

- Launch an energy savings multi-annual plan, setting quantitative objectives and norms in terms of energy conservation (starting with isolation) and environmental improvement, to renovate existing buildings. This plan is put in place through a multi-sectorial contract (through consultation, coordination, control structures and certification organizations, and cross-cutting studies).
- Create optimal conditions for the development of a quality offer, by developing innovation through research and project financing in the green construction sector, and by implementing trainings for the EEA jobs.
- Reinforce the attractiveness of sustainable investments in the housing field, by intervening among both households (energy and housing bonuses, third-party investor system, communication strategy) and the public sector (pursuit of the plan to renovate the housing stock through a cadastre, development of collective heating in public housing, implementation of a global strategy for energy management in regional and local buildings, realization of pilot projects in the public housing sector).
- Reinforce sectorial policies et actions in terms of research, economy, employment and training in other "green jobs".

The multi-annual plan comprises around 50 measures declined around 3 specific objectives:

- Stimulation of private demand for sustainable renovation or construction
- Stimulation of public demand for sustainable renovation or construction
- Consolidation of the offer and of the construction sector capacities, to allow it to answer in a suitable way to this public and private demand reinforcement

=== Intervention Methods ===
In order to reinforce the attractiveness of sustainable investments in the housing sector, the EEA action plan focuses on:

1. On the demand side:
- Implementation of financial and non financial incentives, with particular attention given to low income people
- Implementation of a public investment policy
- Setting progressive environment performance requirements
1. On the offer side:
- Help to companies
- Promotion of Research and Development in companies
- Implementation of financial incentives and tools for companies
- Progressive stages of energy performance requirements
1. At the intersection of supply and demand:
- Various audiences targeted by "green trainings" (jobseekers, students/young people, workers, trainers)
- Training devices adapted to these different audiences

==== Development of a public-household partnership (PHP) ====
The partnership articulates around the implementation of a "one-stop shop" and of EEA contact points that accompany households all along their renovation project. The PHP aims at stimulating demand for private housing renovation through a reform of the energy and housing bonuses, the availability of attractive financing and of complementary incentives.

===== Implementation of a "one-stop shop" =====
This measure aims at correctly informing and accompanying Walloon citizens in the whole of their renovation project. The "one-stop shops" accompany the individuals all along their administrative proceedings, centralizing the information and formalities for greater efficiency and visibility.

Its missions:

- Realizing a succinct diagnostic of the dwelling unit
- Establishing a building "passport"
- Helping with the operation's financial and administrative arrangements
- Accompanying all along the works

===== Building "Passport" =====
The building passport includes information relative to the EU Directive on the energy performance of buildings and to the Energy Advice Procedure (EAP), and takes into account other dimensions such as material use, location, and wholesomeness. This building passport aims to become a unique database integrating all dimensions linked to renovation, including EAPs and works recommendations.

Energy Performance Certificates are classified according to the address of the house, instead of the individual's identity. This allows for a house's new owner to know the history of proceedings and diagnostics already performed on his property. The certificate is valid for 10 years, providing that no modifications are made on the energy equipment. Its realization is carried out by an approved certifier who, after examining the building, has to mention various informations:

- Energy consumption
- Ecological impact (CO_{2} emissions)
- Efficiency of the building envelope, heating systems and other sources of energy (walls, roof, floors...)
- Ventilation
- Renewable energies
- Recommendations for eventual improvements

===== Establishment of "EEA Advisors" =====
The one-stop shop system includes a pool of "EEA Advisors" inside the contact points. These advisors work hand in hand with the teams established in the contact points and are in charge of instructing financial arrangement files and of establishing the building "passport".

In total, around 250 EEA Advisors are scattered over the entire Walloon territory (one advisor for 5 000 houses). The intention is to reach an audience that does not come to the information counter by itself, and so to take them by the hand from the beginning. To do so, the government launches calls for collective projects by neighbourhood, destined to the associative and communal services. In exchange for subventions for operations and after fixing quantitative objectives, these organizations are tasked with the proximity work in a neighbourhood (door to door solicitation, information meetings with an EEA Advisor...).

===== Provision of attractive financing ("Ecopack") =====
Before the creation of the EEA, numerous financial incentives for the residential sector existed, but were often dissociated, granted by different administrations and sometimes incoherent (e.g. isolation bonus granted by the Energy Department, and woodwork renovation bonus granted by the Housing Department).

Within the EEA, Walloon households can benefit from an "Ecopack": a type of financing that covers 100% of the renovation cost, constituted by existing bonuses (energy and housing) put together, and by a 0% loan for the part that is not covered by bonuses. The two bonuses are unified and disbursed at once, with a possibility to pre-finance, based on a thorough quotation (i.e. the financing is disbursed as soon as the works are accepted, rather than at the end of the renovation, allowing the household to avoid financing the payments to the contractor during the works).

Depending on the applicant's income, a rate is applied to the bonuses (from +10% for high incomes to +40% for low incomes). The repayment duration of the 0% loan is lengthened for the lowest income categories: from 5 years for high incomes to 12 years for low incomes. The 10% highest income households cannot benefit from the Ecopack.

This mechanism is operational since March 2012, and is met with great success (especially as the federal tax credit has disappeared).

The 0% loans component is funded by a regional budget system of recoverable advances, made available to households by the structures tasked with implementing and managing the mechanism. The bonuses component of the system is funded by conventional budget allocations dedicated to the "energy" and "housing" bonuses. The system falls within a global budget envelope aimed at maintaining the volume of 0% loans at €150 million.

The Ecopack is granted by the FLW (Walloon Housing Fund) for large families and by the SWCS (Walloon Social Credit Company) for the rest of households. Beneficiary households repay their 0% loan directly to the structures tasked with implementing the mechanism, which then repay the recoverable advances granted by the Walloon Region. The resources from the repayments are distributed by Wallonia to a budgetary fund. The funds can then be reallocated (revolving fund), in the form of new recoverable advances, to the managing structures, so that they can grant new 0% loans to households, while respecting the €150 million limit.

===== Financed works and conditions =====
The necessary condition to access financing is to undertake at least two types of different renovation works, for an investment above €2,500, following a "sustainable bunch" logic. The objective of the EEA is to entice households to undertake a more ambitious project instead of settling for punctual renovation, and so provoke a greater marginal effect on the energetic quality of their house.

An eligible "bunch" is composed of at least two types of sustainable renovation works, with at least one of "energetic performance" type.

The "energetic performance" type works are the following:

- Thermic isolation of the roof, walls, and floors
- Replacing the windows or window frames
- Installation of a ventilation system
- Installation of a condensing boiler with natural gas or oil
- Installation of a heat pump
- Installation of a biomass boiler
- Connection to a heat network

Other accepted works in the "bunch" are:

- Induced works: replacement, refection, stabilization or treatment of the roof, placing an exterior facing, inner lining of a wall, replacing the floors, wall drying, casing a fireplace.
- Small energy saving works: thermostat or thermostatic valve, closing the protected volume, isolating the heating pipes, energy audit.
- Works for the production of renewable energy: photovoltaic panels, installation of solar collectors for domestic hot water and/or heating, micro-generation.

The priority ranking of the works is established with the household, on an ad hoc basis, by the EEA advisor on the basis of elements provided by the applicant, and if the household desires, on the basis of a site visit or of an eventual EAP audit. The EEA advisor makes an analysis note of the bunch request and gives an opinion, which will be used by the Back Office in its financing request study.

In the "energetic performance" type works, the roof thermic isolation has priority. If, in his analysis, the EEA advisor estimates that this work is necessary, this priority shall be considered for certain low-income categories as an entire bunch.

EEA financing is capped at a maximum of €30,000 per works bunch. A maximum of two bunches per house on a 3 years period is eligible for EEA financing, i.e. a maximum cap of €60,000/house/3 years period.

==== Reinforce the construction sector capacities for buildings renovation ====
===== Implementation of a "green training" integrated plan =====
Within the development of a quality offer, training for EEA jobs, in particular for the first Alliance, is a particularly important issue, because it determines the firms' capacity to employ adequate personnel, and opens insertion opportunities to job seekers and professional progression opportunities to workers. The two privileged formation axes are continuous training, and on the middle term, initial training.

===== Elaboration and implementation of a quality label for firms: NRQual =====
The objective is for Wallonia to have a label that allows to guarantee the quality of the works to clients, and to identify professionals from a qualitative point of view.

The label is used as a quality reference for the public, and, at some point, as a reference for financial incentives.

===== Training in the green construction industry =====
In order to reinforce and improve the offer, 80 accompanying jobs have been created in 2012 to help companies formulate their transition strategies towards green construction and allow for time to implement them. Specific help for firms has been put in place via roundtables on EEA jobs, contractor clubs and awareness and vulgarization campaigns.

Trainings are organized for various audiences. The objective is to integrate new competences linked to green jobs in training repositories, teaching programs, and trainers' training.

==== Stimulate renovation demand/public buildings construction ====
Beyond renovation of the private housing stock, a number of measures in the EEA target public buildings:

- Support public markets:
1. Pursue the integration of social and environmental clauses in public organizations' specifications for construction and renovation;
2. Define help tools for public actors.
- Implement a large plan for renovation of the public housing stock;
- Realize pilot projects in public housing;
- Accelerate creation and renovation procedures for public housing;
- Develop collective heating in the public housing sector;
- Implement a subventions device aimed at supporting public law persons and non-commercial organisms that want to reduce their building's energy consumption.

=== Implementation/Operations ===
==== Management ====
EEA coordination is managed by the Ministry of Sustainable Development, Public Service, Energy, Housing and Research. A coordination cell mandated with the implementation of the multi-annual plan and multi-sectorial contracts is part of the administration services. Its mission is to elaborate evaluation and impact indicators of the EEA. The cell is under direct authority of the Minister mandated with EEA coordination, who organizes implementation and works.

The ministers have a decisional power on all measures of the multi-annual plan. The majority of the executive power (27 measures) is delegated to Walloon public actors, and the rest is scattered between extra-regional public actors, private sector companies federations, other private sector actors, associative sector actors, clusters, and training centres. Administrative or budgetary management is entirely in the hands of Walloon public actors.

==== Follow-up and evaluation ====
In the framework of the Marshall Plan 2.Green evaluation, thematic evaluations have been carried out during realization of the Plan, and a global evaluation at the end of programming, by the IWEPS (Walloon Institute for Evaluation, Prospective and Statistics).

Steering for the implementation of the "Green construction" axis of the Alliance is carried out by a mixed follow-up committee, presided by a representative of the minister mandated with EEA coordination and composed of representatives of ministers of the Kern (i.e. restricted Council of Ministers), of the administration, unions, and construction sectors.

=== EEA Financing ===
Each axis of the Marshall Plan 2.Green has a specific budget. The budgetary envelope is closed and the budgetary means shall be allocated exclusively to public policies part of the plan, except in case of a decision made by the Walloon executive.

A budget made of €1.6 billion of ordinary credits and €1.15 billion of alternative financing is devoted to the implementation of the measures, for the whole 2010-2014 period. The annual MP2.Green financing represents 4.2% of the Walloon region budget.

The financing source of the different measures depends on their nature:

- Ordinary financing allows the Walloon region to manage its current expenditures
- The alternative financing mechanism is activated to finance investments (real estate, public equipment, sanitation, or rehabilitation of disused sites of economic activity) amortized on a minimum of 20 years. Alternative financing is refinanced by loans contracted by third party institutions whose interest charges and investment amortization appear each year. The use of alternative financing is a classical debudgetisation process allowing the executive power to undertake public investments (infrastructure, housing, economic activity zones arrangement, sanitation of polluted sites...) whose charge is spread over a minimum of 20 years. Alternative financing is mobilized through Walloon financial instruments (SOWAFINAL, CRAC and SWL).

The new policies of the Plan that target the development of sustainable investments in the housing sector and the increase in welcoming structures are largely financed by alternative credit (70%).

In 2009, the total EEA budget was of €279,6 million of ordinary financing and €600 million of alternative financing, i.e. a planned total of €880 million over the Plan's duration.

=== Results and Evolutions ===
==== 1st EEA results ====
The details of the budgets engaged in the EEA are as follows:

Measure	Budget (€ million)
Energy and housing bonuses	370
Ecopack	230
PIVERT	400
UREBA	105
Training	42
Others	117
Total	1,264

===== Affected public =====
Various awareness actions, other than direct help, have occurred towards owners, tenants, companies and merchants, with a total of 870,000 persons sensitized in one way or another over the legislation duration.

===== Jobs =====
Through jobs creation, EEA measures benefited 420,000 employees and 15,600 employers over the legislation. €1 million invested in the sector allows to create or maintain 10 jobs for 1 year. On average in a year, 4,700 jobs are linked to the EEA over the 2010-2014 period.

This kind of policy brings about an important return effect (on the middle and long term) that benefits federal, regional and local public finances: value added tax revenues, corporation tax, tax on individuals, communal additions to the tax on individuals, Social Security National Office contributions, reduction of unemployment benefits, etc. This return effect is estimated at 40% of the direct public investment.

===== Environment =====
The energy administration detains estimations concerning the avoided CO_{2} emissions. They are based on the savings in terms of MWh.

The EEA measures put in place during the legislature allowed to save 590,000 tons of CO_{2} in 2014. This corresponds to an annual consumption of 50,000 households.

Adding the tons of CO_{2} saved during the legislature, we get to a cumulative total of over 1.5 million tons of CO_{2}.

===== Purchasing power =====
From the calculation of saved MWh, the realized financial savings have been estimated at €215 million in 2014, and €556 million over the duration of the legislature.

A study taking into account the amount of financed works, the impact on energy saving, and the lifetime of installations, estimated that in terms of purchasing power, the investment in housing isolation and performance allows households to realize economy savings of €2.5 billion over the lifetime of the equipment.

==== EEA adoption by the Brussels region ====
In 2010, the Brussels government decided to adopt a strategy similar to that of Wallonia, by setting up an Employment-Environment Alliance.

The first employment-environment alliance was defined around 4 axis:

- Axis 1: Green construction
- Axis 2: Water
- Axis 3: Resources and waste
- Axis 4: Sustainable supply of food

The objective of the "Green construction" axis is to "stimulate and accompany the Brussels actors in the construction sector so that they develop a competitive offer in terms of green construction and renovation."

===== Partnerships =====
The Agreement on the Sustainable Construction Axis gathered 50 private and public signatories. The process involves 130 organizations (52% public and 48% private). The actors in question elaborated 44 concrete actions aimed at answering challenges of teaching, training, insertion, technical references, research, support to companies, financing, labels... After the elaboration phase, the concrete engagements have been approved by the government, and the actors signed the Agreement text on February 25, 2011.

The EEA multiannual plan engages 44 partners who signed the multi-sectorial contracts.

===== Objectives =====
The current actions and policies of the EEA provide for the creation of 10,100 jobs until 2020, with in particular 4,300 jobs in sustainable construction.

===== Results =====
- 12,200 sq m of sustainable construction training centers have been established
- 184,000 hours of training between 2011 and 2013
- 1,800 companies (among which some in social economy) or independents sensitized, accompanied, supported or involved in the transition towards sustainable construction
- 15 training operators committed
- 26 schools part of at least one EEA action, i.e. almost the whole of Brussels schools concerned
- 155 teaching professors and trainers trained or involved in actions, i.e. more than half of teachers and workshop leaders from "construction" teaching sections
- 1,915 young people involved in the Alliance, including indirectly 1,600 young people at the stage of initial sustainable construction training, i.e. half of student promotions of 2012-2012 and 2013-2014
- 800 job seekers trained
- 100 public executives informed about new social and environmental clauses to be introduced in specifications
- 59 research laboratories and 92 research projects recorded in the sustainable construction field

Within a follow-up committee, social partners involved in steering the sustainable construction axis identified three major contributions from the project:

- The process allowed for the encounter of various actors and ended up in a real collective dynamic that concretized in the development and reinforcement of collaborations and partnerships between the different types of actors.
- The "bottom-up" approach allowed to direct public means towards the answers to the needs of companies and of the sector's workers.
- The animation method allowed to increase the responsibility of involved actors on the implementation of the actions: regular organization of follow-up workshops and of meetings between actors fosters efficiency and relevance of actions, as well as the actors being well informed about the evolution of actions.

== United Kingdom - The Green Deal ==
=== Context and Creation ===
The major idea underlying the Green Deal is the "pay as you save" principle, whereby a homeowner gets renovation works performed by a contractor, and then pays the costs according to the amount saved on its energy bill. Pilot programs took place from the 2008 up until mid-2011. When the Pay As You Save (PAYS) pilot ended, the government implemented the "Green Deal", introducing various new measures: the "Golden Rule" (whereby repayments must not exceed energy savings), financing linked to the energy bill, obligation for the energy suppliers to adapt their billing system to collect repayments, and introduction of the "Energy Company Obligation" (ECO).

The first Green Deal policy was outlined in 2010 by the Conservative Party. The amount of the loans would be of up to £6,500. After a series of setbacks, a renewed Green Deal was launched on 28 January 2013, with mixed results.

At the time of creation, the Green Deal was praised as "revolutionary," its initiators setting very high targets. The government expected that 14 million homes could benefit from it until 2020, that investments could reach £10 billion, and that 65,000 jobs could be created. However, in 2012, numbers in take-up rates were greatly disappointing, making the Green Deal look like it was "doomed to fail." The Green Deal principle relied on take-up by the market, which was greatly criticized for having "never worked anywhere in the world […] and unlikely to happen in the UK."

In April 2012, the Government considered obliging householders who are undertaking home improvements to spend an extra 10% of the cost on energy efficiency measures. The media portrayed it as a "conservatory tax" robbing householders and making any building project overly expensive. Ministers thus decided to abandon the idea.

A new impetus given at the beginning of 2013 allowed the government to rescue the project. In July 2014, the DECC closed applications for the Green Deal Home Improvement Fund. The £120 million fund has been depleted by "overwhelming public demand", triggering furious reactions by the sector, and displaying another setback for the Green Deal (but also promising take-up results).

=== Results ===
The latest results published by the Government in July 2014 are as follows:

- 875,000 measures were installed in around 726,000 properties to the end of May 2014, an increase from 836,000 measures in April, and from 311,250 in September 2013.
- 3,234 households had Green Deal plans in progress at the end of June 2014, 15% more than the 2,828 at the end of May, and more than double the 1,500 at the end of November 2013. Nearly half of all plans were completed (all measures installed).

== Norway - Enova SF ==
=== Context and policies. ===
The Norwegian system is managed by the national energy efficiency agency Enova SF, which the Ministry of Climate and Environment owns. All subsidies are funded by a tax on Norwegian electricity bills, known as the "Enova-fee". The subsidy systems stated goal is to reduce the cost of high-end technologies until they become established players in the market. The system consists of four main parts. Firstly, financial subsidies are offered for "holistic building energy upgrade", where 25% of the costs, up to NOK 100,000 - 150,000, are reimbursed for highly ambitious refurbishments. Secondly, a free advisory service, 'Enova answers', where households can ask questions about energy retrofitting and subsidies. Thirdly, a loaning scheme through "Husbanken". Finally, several smaller subsidies in the NOK 10,000 range are offered for smaller changes such as hydronic heating and more.

=== Results and critique. ===
Norway has one of the highest annual energy refurbishment rates in Europe, 3.4%. However, some research argues a small number of continuous retrofitters inflates this number. Similarly, studies have shown that most of the subsidies distributed end up in high-income households.
