= Haute Qualité Environnementale =

The Haute Qualité Environnementale or HQE (High Quality Environmental standard) is a standard for green building in France, based on the principles of sustainable development first set out at the 1992 Earth Summit. The standard is controlled by the Paris-based Association pour la Haute Qualité Environnementale (ASSOHQE).

== Coverage ==
The standard specifies criteria for the following:

Managing the impacts on the outdoor environment

- Harmonious relationship between buildings and their immediate environment
- Integrated choice of construction methods and materials
- The avoidance of nuisance by the construction site.
- Minimizing energy use
- Minimizing water use
- Minimizing waste in operations
- Minimizing building maintenance and repair

Creating a pleasant indoor environment

- Hydrothermal control measures
- Acoustic control measures
- Visual attractiveness
- Measures to control smells
- Hygiene and cleanliness of the indoor spaces
- Air quality controls
- Water quality controls

== Future development ==
On 16 June 2009, it was announced that the CSTB (Centre Scientifique et Technique du Batiment) and its subsidiary CertiVéA had signed a memorandum of understanding to work together with the global arm of the United Kingdom's Building Research Establishment (BRE) to develop a pan-European building environmental assessment method. The BRE developed and markets BREEAM (the BRE Environmental Assessment Method), which has similarities to the French HQE. Unfortunately, BREEAM and HQE are still disseminating their own standards round the world, leaving little doubt that no pan-European method will emerge in the near future, at least stemming from these two organisations.

== International development ==
Since 2013, the HQE brand is now available for buildings and districts worldwide. As of 2016 HQE is present in 24 countries.

== See also ==
- Green building
- Green building in France
- Sustainable architecture
- Sustainable design
