= Green building in France =

This article is intended to give an overview of green building in France

In July 2007, the French government established six working groups to address ways to redefine France's environment policy. The proposed recommendations were then put to public consultation, leading to a set of recommendations released at the end of October 2007. These recommendations will be put to the French parliament in early 2008.

The name of the process, "Le Grenelle de l'Environnement", refers to a 1968 conference when government negotiated with unions to end weeks of social unrest.

The six working groups addressed climate change, biodiversity and natural resources, health and the environment, production and consumption, democracy and governance, and competitiveness and employment.

Recommendations include:

- invest Eur 1 billion in clean energy over the next four years as part of wide-reaching environmental plan to cut emissions of greenhouse gases, including proposals for ecological taxes;

20% reduction in France's energy consumption by 2020 and a boosting of the use of renewable energy, such as wind power and biofuels, by 20% by 2020;

- freight be transported on new high-speed rail lines and waterways rather than highways; and
- a series of green taxes including a tax on the most polluting vehicles, as well as a tax on transport trucks crossing France's borders.

Building labels

The French regulation (RT) for new construction was following an incremental logic with a regular (every five years) increase in the exigence level requested to achieve by 2020 (RT 2020) a 40% reduction of energy consumption with respect to the RT 2000. Current label are: THPE 2005=20% better than the RT2005. THPE EnR 2005= 30% better than RT2005+ Renewable energy production for the majority of heating.

Within the framework of the "Grenelle de l’envronnement", a performance acceleration is expected to meet with the following objectives for tertiary buildings:

I. Low consumption buildings (BBC) by 2010 with minimum requirements concerning the levels of renewable energy and CO_{2} absorption materials by 2012.

II. Passive new buildings (BEPAS) or Positive buildings (BEPOS) by 2020.

Labels for refurbishment of existing BBC buildings.

All these developments match with the European and international regulations and frameworks.

== See also ==
- Haute Qualité Environnementale
