= Green building in Mexico =

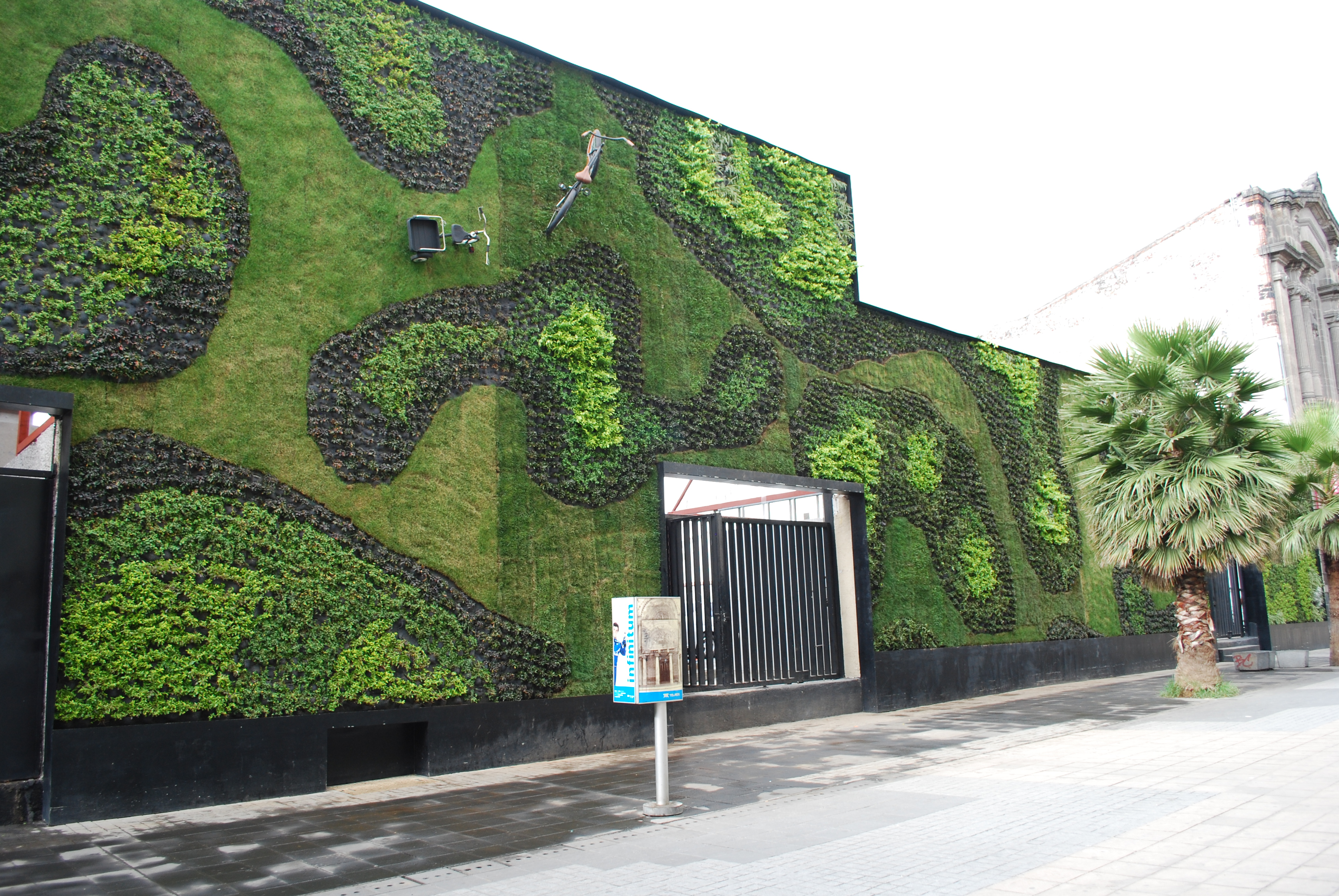
Green wall at the Universidad del Claustro de Sor Juana in the historic center of Mexico City.

This article is intended to give an overview of green building in Mexico

The Mexican town of San Felipe, Baja California, is home to the largest solar-powered community in North America (3000+ home sites), with completely off-the-grid neighborhoods within El Dorado Ranch, a 30,000-acre (120 km^{2}) development in San Felipe.

Because of the arid climate in this Gulf of California town, a number of green building initiatives have been implemented including:

- Straw-Bale Home Construction, enabling insulation factors of R-35 to R-50, as verified by the U.S. Dept. of Energy, 1995.
- Predominant use of xeriscaping - landscaping practices that reduces water consumption, energy consumption and toxic chemical usage.
- Golf Course construction utilizing SeaDwarf Grass, one of the most salt tolerant grasses with the ability to withstand ongoing irrigation having salinity levels in excess of 20 parts per thousand total dissolved solids (TDS) (equivalent to 55% of marine salinity).
