= Renewable energy credit =

A renewable energy credit (REC) is a certificate corresponding to the environmental attributes of energy produced from renewable sources such as wind or solar. RECs were created as a means to track progress towards and compliance with states' Renewable Portfolio Standards (RPS), meant to support a cleaner generation mix.

RECs should not be confused with the tax credits that renewable energy projects are eligible to receive. In the United States, as part of the 2009 economic stimulus package, renewable Energy Rebate Programs are in place. Currently, solar is eligible for a 30% federal tax credit.

Renewable energy credits are one of two main outputs or benefits from generation of new power from renewable sources. Renewable power generation creates actual power in the form of electricity, and environmental benefits to society from “green” power production – such as minimizing pollution and slowing the rate finite fuel resources are used. The actual power is sold into the local grid, and the societal benefits are sold in the form of Renewable Energy Credits or “RECs”, sold separately as a commodity into the marketplace. While RECs are not actually a measure of power, each REC represents one megawatt hour (MWh) of renewable-generated energy. For each REC purchased the customer is able to claim the equivalent MWh of energy reduction as an offset to their conventional energy use. Because RECs provide an additional revenue stream to renewable energy projects, they are essentially a subsidy meant to allow clean resources to economically compete with fossil fuel–based resources.

Opponents highlight that by purchasing RECs a customer can claim emissions “reduction” even if they do not actually reduce their end-use at all - or even increase it. Proponents counter that more REC purchases drive increased production of renewable power which can replace conventional production.
