= Green building in India =

A green building is one that uses less water, optimizes energy efficiency, conserves natural resources, generates less waste and provides healthier spaces for occupants, as compared to a conventional building. The Indian green building council (IGBC) is the leading green building movement in the country. Throughout the building lifecycle, green buildings employ practices that are resource- and environmentally-conscious. The idea of "green buildings" attempts to completely reduce any bad effects while maximizing any beneficial effects a structure has on both its surrounding environment and its human occupants.

== Indian Green Building Council ==
The Indian Green Building Council (IGBC) was formed by the Confederation of Indian Industry (CII) in 2001 The council is based out of the CII-Sohrabji Green Business Centre, Hyderabad which is India's 1st Platinum rated green building and a Net Zero Energy Building. The vision of the council is to enable a ‘Sustainable built environment for all.

IGBC is India's premier body for green building certification and related services. Today, with strong support from various stakeholders, they have achieved the following significant milestones:

- 8,669 projects registered with IGBC from various parts of India and abroad, amounting to a total footprint of 9.75 billion square feet (906,000,000 m^{2})
- 31 IGBC green building ratings that cover all typologies of projects - residential, commercial, industrial, healthcare, etc.
- 1,700+ IGBC Member Organizations comprising developers, corporates, architects, consultants, institutes, government, etc.
- 6,132+ qualified IGBC Accredited Green Building Professionals; more than 30,000 stakeholders have been trained by IGBC until date.

IGBC certifies the green projects which are conceptualized, designed, constructed and operated as per IGBC Ratings. Till date, more than 3,088 projects (approx 1,315 million square feet (122.2×10^{6} m^{2})) have been rated by IGBC. These IGBC-rated projects, as compared to conventional structures, have demonstrated tremendous savings to the extent of up to:

- 15,000 MWh of Energy per million sq ft. per annum
- 45,000 KL of Water per million sq ft. per annum
- Installation of 100 MW of renewable energy in IGBC certified projects
- Reduced CO_{2} emissions by 12,000 tons per million sq ft. per annum
- Diverted 500 tons of construction waste from landfill per million sq ft.

Green projects rated by IGBC fall under one of the following levels (in ascending order): Certified, Silver, Gold and Platinum.

Residential buildings in India: The residential building sector is one of the largest consumers of electricity in India. Continuous urbanisation and the growth of population result in increasing power consumption in buildings. Thus, while experts express the huge potential for energy conservations in this sector, the belief still predominates among stakeholders that energy-efficient buildings are more expensive than conventional buildings, which adversely affects the “greening” of the building sector. This belief is contested by studies finding evidence for the opposite being the case.

Some of the real estate developers that are complying with IGBC standards on all or some of its projects are Godrej Properties Limited, TATA Housing, Mahindra Lifespaces, Gulshan Group, AKSHAT Apartments, Nature Homes & Spaces, etc.

== IGBC Rating System ==
The IGBC rating system is a voluntary, consensus based, market-driven programme. They are divided into different sectors and built environments to enable an integrated approach considering life cycle impacts of the resources used.

Rating Systems:

1. IGBC GREEN RESIDENTIAL (Green Homes, Green Residential Societies, Green Affordable Housing, IGBC Nest)
2. IGBC GREEN COMMERCIAL (Green New Buildings, Green Existing Buildings, Health and Well-being, Green Healthcare, Green Data Center, Green Service Buildings, Green Resorts, Green Interiors)
3. IGBC GREEN INDUSTRIAL (Green Factory Buildings, Green Logistics Park & Warehouses)
4. IGBC GREEN BUILT ENVIRONMENT (Green Townships, Green Cities, Green Existing Cities, Green Hill Habitat, Green Mass Rapid Transit System, Green Existing Mass Rapid Transit System, Green Railway Stations, Green High Speed Rail, Green Landscapes, Green Villages)
5. IGBC GREEN NET-ZERO (Net Zero Water Buildings, Net Zero Waste Rating System, Net Zero Carbon Guidelines)
6. OTHER BUILDING TOPOGRAPHIES (Green Schools, Green Campus, Green Place of Worship)

== IGBC Chapters ==
To maintain the IGBC standards and regulations at regional levels IGBC established a Mission of local chapters that allows faster and efficient application of IGBC's sustainable vision by involving local agencies & green institutions in the green building movement. IGBC National chairman is Mr. B Thiagarajan and vice chairman is Mr. C Shekar Reddy.

IGBC Local Chapters Chairman and Co-chairman:

- Ahmedabad - Mr. Jayesh Hariyani (Chairman) & Mr. Taral Shah (Co-chair)
- Amravati - Mr. Vijaya Sai Meka (Chairman) & Mr. Ganesh Sai Chaitanya Gali (Co-chair)
- Aurangabad - Mr. Navin Bagadiya (Chairman) & Ar. Mohammad Hares Siddiqui (Co-chair)
- Bangalore - Ar. Anup Naik (Chairman) & Mr. V Gopal (Co-chair)
- Belagavi - Mr. Chaitanya Kulkarni (Chairman)
- Bhubaneswar - Ar. Manonjaya Rath (Chairman) & Mr. Rakesh Bhura (Co-chair)
- Chandigarh - Mr. Jagjit Singh Majha (Chairman)
- Chennai - Mr. Mahesh Anand (Chairman) & Mr. Sriram Subramanian (Co-chair)
- Cochin - Mr. K Lava (Chairman) & Ar. Lalichan Zacharis (Co-chair)
- Coimbatore - Mr. Rajesh B Lund (Chairman)
- Delhi - Mr.Sanjay Kr Varshney (Chairman)
- Goa - Mr. Kula Sekhar Kantipudi (Chairman) & Mr. Prakash Jalan (Co-chair)
- Hyderabad - Ar. Sriniva Murthy G (Chairman)
- Indore - Mr. Vinod Bapna (Chairman) & Mr. Kushagra Agrawal (Co-chair)
- Jaipur - Mr. Dhirendra Madan (Chairman) & Mr. Sunil Jain (Co-chair)
- Kolkata - Mr. Sushil Mohta (Chairman) & Ar. Vivek Singh Rathore (Co-chair)
- Lucknow - Mr. Amit Srivastava (Chairman)
- Mangalore - Ar. Venkatesh Pai (Chairman) & Ms Kritheen Amin (Co-chair)
- Mumbai - Dr. Mala Singh (Chairperson) & Mr. Chitranjan Kaushik (Co-chair)
- Mysore - Mr. Vinod Maroli (Chairman) & Mr. Srihari D (Co-chair)
- Nagpur - Mr. Shankar G Ghime (Chairman)
- Nashik - Mr. Kiran Chavan (Chairman) & Mr. Sunil Kotwal (Co-chair)
- North East - Er. J N Khataniar (Chairman) & Mr. Saurav Pansari (Co-chair)
- Navi Mumbai - Ar. Hiten Sethi (Chairman) & Mr. Ashok B. Chhajer (Co-chair)
- Patna - Mr. Sudip Kumar (Chairman) & Ar. Abhishek Sharma (Co-chair)
- Pune - Ms. Poorva Keskar (Chairperson) & Mr. Hrishikesh Manjrekar (Co-chair)
- Surat - Mr. Nirj Viradiya (Chairman) & Mr. Punit Mittal (Co-chair)
- Vadodara - Ms. Shreya Dalwadi (Chairperson)
- Visakhapatnam - Dr. K Kumar Raja (Chairman) & Mr. Koteswara Rao Peela (Co-chair)
- Western UP Chapter - Mr. K D Singh (Chairman)

== EDGE Program in India ==
The IFC, a member of the World Bank Group, and the Confederation of Real Estate Developers' Associations of India (CREDAI), apex body of private real estate developers, have partnered to promote green buildings in the country through IFC's EDGE certification. An MoU was signed in the presence of former Minister for Environment and Forests Prakash Javadekar on November 25, 2014.

== BEE certification ==
The Indian Bureau of Energy Efficiency (BEE) launched the Energy Conservation Building Code (ECBC). The code is set for energy efficiency standards for design and construction with any building of minimum conditioned area of 1,000 m^{2} and a connected demand of power of 500 KW or 600 KVA. The energy performance index of the code is set from 90 kW·h/sqm/year to 200 kW·h/sqm/year where any buildings that fall under the index can be termed as "ECBC Compliant Building"

Moreover, the BEE launched a five-star rating scheme for office buildings operated only in the day time in three climatic zones, composite, hot&dry, warm&humid on 25 February 2009. IGBC rated green buildings are also able to meet or exceed the ECBC compliance. The CII Sohrabji Godrej Green Business Centre is a BEE 5 star-rated building.

The Reserve Bank of India's buildings in Delhi, Bhubaneshwar in Orissa and in Kerala have been star rated.

In Tamil Nadu 11 buildings were star rated by BEE, in the year 2010, including RBI buildings.

== Green houses ==
In Tamil Nadu, the government is planning to build solar-powered green houses for rural poor. It has allotted Rs.1058 crore for construction of 60,000 houses.

In Maharashtra, near Mumbai in the Thane District, Govardhan Eco Village, a community in India, has built buildings with compressed stabilized Earth blocks, Rammed Earth Technique, Cob Houses(ADOBE Bricks) with traditional thatched roofs. These buildings have received a five-star rating from GRIHA, an Indian Nationwide Green Standards for Buildings, a wing of the famous TERI.

== Traditional buildings ==
Traditional buildings were energy efficient because architecture depended on the places. Buildings in the hot and dry regions, had corridors directing the wind to cool naturally. In wet regions, structures using natural light and breeze, were used. Some examples are

- Hawa Mahal - Articulated windows provides cool breeze in a desert area
- Golkonda - Ventilation is designed to let in fresh cool breeze, in spite of summer.

The traditional building practices were utilized in constructing the Dhyanalinga. Mud mortar stabilized with lime, sand, alum and some herbal additives was used.

== See also ==
- Energy Conservation Building Code
- Laurie Baker
- Solar power in India
- Green Building in Bangladesh
