= Tropical green building =

Building type in tropical environments

Tropical Green Building refers to a style of construction that focuses on energy reduction, reduced use of chemicals, and supporting local labor and community. This requires close cooperation of the design team, the architects, the engineers, and the client at all project stages, from site selection, scheme formation, material selection and procurement, to project implementation. Tropical Green Building has the same basis as green building in more temperate climates, but the methods of construction are completely different. In the tropics, the focus is on keeping cool, preventing insect infestations, and reduced mould, damp and maintenance in the home.

Generally, tropical green building also seeks to reduce power consumption through intelligent architecture, such as by allowing in much natural light so electric lights are not needed during the daytime, and at night, using white-painted roofs, ceilings and low-energy light bulbs such as compact fluorescents or LED lamps.

Solar power, wind power, and/or the use of micro hydro are often deployed, but not always the focus of tropical green building.
