= INTEGER Millennium House =

INTEGER Millennium House The Smart Home
- Location within England

General information
- Type: House
- Location: Garston, Watford, England, United Kingdom, United Kingdom
- Coordinates: 51°41′55.87″N 0°22′32.04″W
- Construction started: 1997
- Completed: 1998

Technical details
- Floor area: 3,000 sq ft (280 m^{2})

Design and construction
- Architects: Damian Bree (Dip Arch Tech), Tim Day (RIBA), Paul Hodgkins (RIBA), Nicholas Thompson (RIBA)
- Awards: 1998 European Intelligent Building of the Year, 1999 National Homebuilders Award for Ecology, 2000 Homes Award for Innovation, 2003 National Homebuilders Award for House of the Future

The INTEGER Millennium House is a demonstration house in Watford, England that opened to the public in 1998. It was renamed The Smart Home after being refurbished in 2013. The house was originally intended to showcase innovations in design and construction, building intelligence, and environmental performance. The INTEGER design included many innovative features, including environmental technology such as a green roof and a grey water recycling system, home automation that included a building management system and an intelligent security system, and innovative technical systems such as under-floor trench heating. In 2013, the house was refurbished and retrofitted with a variety of new and upgraded features, including a building-integrated photovoltaic (BIPV) array, which altogether halved its carbon emissions and increased its energy efficiency by 50%. Since its creation, the house has garnered numerous awards, appeared on Tomorrow's World on BBC Television, hosted thousands of visitors, and influenced mainstream construction.

== Design and construction ==
The origins of the INTEGER Millennium House date to a May 1996 seminar about green building, which catalysed the formation of the INTEGER building design and consultancy team to "evaluate available design and technical solutions to improve housing performance". The efforts of this design team resulted in the creation of a scale model of a house, which has subsequently been widely exhibited at institutions such as the Science Museum, London as well as profiled in the DK Eyewitness Book Future.

Damian Bree, Tim Day, Paul Hodgkins, and Nicholas Thompson began designing the INTEGER Millennium House itself in October 1997, a process that proceeded for 10 weeks. Built on the Building Research Establishment (BRE)'s Innovation Park property in Garston, Watford, the actual construction of the house took 13 weeks before it opened to the public in 1998. The resulting single-family, three-bedroom, 3,000 sq ft (280 m^{2}) demonstration house was intended to be a global showcase for innovations in design and construction, building intelligence, and environmental performance, as well as to raise general awareness about environmental design and sustainable construction.

Built as a demonstration project without a budget, the INTEGER Millennium House benefited from expertise and materials that were donated by suppliers without any cost to the project. The entire house was constructed with standard components, many of which were prefabricated, including concrete for the floor slabs and timber for the superstructure, cladding, and frame. Neither prototypes nor experimental components were used in the building of the house.

== Features ==
As originally built, the INTEGER Millennium House included numerous examples of environmental technology, including a green roof, wind turbine, solar photovoltaic panels, and solar water heaters capable of heating water up to 95 °C (203 °F). The house also featured a geothermal heat pump, rainwater collection and retention for both washing cars and watering gardens, and a grey water recycling system that reuses waste water from bathing and washing for toilet flushing, reducing water usage by roughly 30%. Additionally, the south side of the house was built as a three-story glass conservatory designed to provide passive heat gain, although in direct sunlight it could overheat. Altogether, the house achieved "Level 4 +" environmental performance according to the Code for Sustainable Homes.

The INTEGER Millennium House was also built with a variety of intelligent home automation technologies, including a building management system that could optimize the performance of the heating system, an automatic garden irrigation system that could sense soil humidity conditions and water accordingly, an intelligent security system, lighting that could be set to one of four predefined moods, and microchip-embedded programmable door keys. The house also featured advanced communication technologies such as a telephone service distributed via a local building exchange, digital satellite and terrestrial television available in every room, WebTV, and a closed-circuit television (CCTV) system.

Furthermore, the INTEGER Millennium House included numerous innovative technical systems, including under-floor trench heating controlled individually in each room by thermostat, a central service core containing all of the house's cables and pipes in a vertical space designed to provide easy access for maintenance and upgrade, and timber-framed bathroom modules similar to those built for use in the off-shore oil drilling industry.

== Refurbishment ==
In 2013, the BRE and British Gas collaborated to refurbish and retrofit the INTEGER Millennium House, which they renamed The Smart Home. As with the original build, there were neither budgets nor contracts for the refurbishment of The Smart Home, and many suppliers donated products and expertise to the effort.

Chief among the upgrades are a "whole house living system" that uses occupation sensors to control heating, lighting, security, ventilation, and water, a new solar thermal system along with an upgraded solar water heating system, and a building-integrated photovoltaic (BIPV) array within the glazing of the conservatory glass itself that generates electricity in addition to providing shade. Built by Polysolar and rated at 3.3 kW (4.4 hp), the BIPV array provides The Smart Home with approximately 3,500 kWh (4,700 hp⋅h) of electricity annually, accounting for all of the house's daytime electric needs and approximately a third of its total energy requirements while also saving 1.8 long tons (1.8 t) of carbon dioxide. Furthermore, the thin film material used in the BIPV array allows it to absorb ambient and reflective light on both sides of the glass, which allows it to operate in most weather conditions. Additionally, it allows the red light that is vital for photosynthesis to pass through, making the glass conservatory highly suitable for growing plants. Hamish Watson, the CEO of Polysolar, described the use of such BIPV arrays as "an effective way of including energy micro-generation into the fabric of a building".

Other upgrades made during the retrofit include the application of heat-reflective paint, insulating plaster, and phase changing material to improve the house's thermal performance, the use of light-reflective particles in interior paint to reduce lighting needs, and various other green and energy-efficient features, such as double-glazed doors and windows, ducted skirting, and reclaimed timber floors. In all, the upgrades made to the house halved its carbon emissions and increased its energy efficiency by 50%, while also upgrading the building's Energy Performance Certificate (EPC) rating from E to A/B.

The Smart Home was officially opened to the public on 2 October 2013 by Dorothy Thornhill, the Mayor of Watford, and Kerry Pollard, a former member of parliament from St Albans who had supported the original INTEGER project in 1998.

== Awards and impact ==
In its original iteration, the INTEGER Millennium House garnered numerous awards, including the European Intelligent Building of the Year (1998), the National Homebuilders Award for Ecology (1999), the Homes Award for Innovation (2000), and the National Homebuilders Award for House of the Future (2003). Furthermore, the house was featured on two BBC Television programmes, both Tomorrow's World and a six-part special series entitled DreamHouse. Between its opening as the INTEGER Millennium House in 1998 and its refurbishment as The Smart Home in 2013, the house was visited by more than 5,000 people.

Additionally, many of the building's innovative features and technologies have been integrated into mainstream construction. For instance, by April 2001, 12 two-bedroom flats with INTEGER-inspired features had been built in Harlow, Essex. Core INTEGER-style technologies that were used in the flats included enhanced insulation and a high-efficiency communal boiler system that reduced energy demand by 50%, as well as reduced servicing by replacing 12 small boilers with two large ones, and a grey water recycling system that reduced water consumption by 30%.
