= Revolving fund =

Fund that is replenished

A revolving fund is a fund or account that remains available to finance an organization's continuing operations without any fiscal year limitation, because the organization replenishes the fund by repaying money used from the account. Revolving funds have been used to support both government and non-profit operations.

In the case of revolving funds for a government project whose budget goes through annual parliamentary or other legislative appropriations that relate to a fiscal year then the unutilized balance may lapse after the close of the financial year. However it is restored the next year provided the agency concerned includes the amount in next year's appropriation.

Within federal and state governments, law establishes revolving funds. Revolving funds, established for the purpose of carrying out specific activities, institute a basis under which financing for the cost of goods or services furnished to or by a government agency originate. Revolving funds are to be replenished through charges made for such goods or services.

Revolving funds can be especially valuable for non-profit organizations because they afford both the donor and the non-profit significant advantages. Often a non-profit must announce a program, engage personnel, extend invitations or sign contracts well ahead of raising the donations or receiving the program revenue that will cover the costs. In such cases a revolving fund allows the non-profit to commit to programs early so that it can ensure professional execution and the program's success. The non-profit then can work to generate the revenue, donations, or other support that will repay the money spent.

There are several situations in which such funds would be particularly helpful, one example would be funding sources for historic preservation projects. A non-profit preservation organization would establish a fund to receive donations and other capital which is used by the organization to purchase endangered property which is then resold with easements. Some organizations also make loans for building renovations, which then replenish the revolving funds as those loans are repaid. The Providence Revolving Fund is one of the largest local revolving funds in the US.

Another example would be a revolving fund established to provide support for programs that require a long-term commitment for planning well ahead of the non-profit's fund-raising cycle. By accessing money in the revolving fund, the non-profit can commit to the project, including signing contracts or issuing invitations, knowing that funding is available from the revolving fund. As the project is funded through donations or through revenue the project may generate, the funds can be repaid to the revolving fund. This ensures the fund is available for future programming.

Such a revolving fund offers several advantages to the donor. The donor's commitment is limited and the gift can be restricted for the sole purpose of supporting the program(s) for which it is intended. At the same time the funds committed to a revolving fund may be multiplied several fold as the non-profit repays money it may have taken from the fund. The non-profit will have a great incentive to repay the money to the revolving fund, in order to continue to enjoy the advantages of the revolving fund for future years.

== United States government ==
According to "A Glossary of Terms Used in the Federal Budget Process", a revolving fund is established by Congress to finance a cycle of businesslike operations through amounts received by the fund. A revolving fund charges for the sale of products or services and uses the proceeds to finance its spending, usually on a self-sustaining basis.
