= Energy rebate program =

An Energy Rebate Program, or Energy Credit Incentive Program, provides a cash rebate program for customers planning to install new, energy efficient information technology (IT) equipment or cooling systems. These programs push companies to construct more energy efficient data centers, or to consolidate compute, storage and networking resources via virtualization technologies.

An Energy Rebate Program is a simple way for customers to apply and qualify for various energy rebates offered by energy service companies, or utilities, in their respective coverage areas. To lower IT equipment's carbon footprint, data center customers are looking at processes for protecting and respecting the environment through eco-friendly operations and data center design. This idea is being pushed by organizations such as The Green Grid, Climate Savers Computing Initiative and the Silicon Valley Leadership Group. Customer demand for energy rebates encourages the development of programs for IT vendors' computers, storage, networking or data center facilities. IT vendors are taking steps to provide more energy efficient IT systems and working with utilities to secure rebate savings for customers and their new installations.

== History ==
In the past, data center designers and operators focused more on data center reliability than on energy efficiency. Equipment cooling concerns and the costs of water cooled infrastructure in large scale IBM centers, for instance, was a significant, though secondary issue, in buying decisions. Increasingly data center power density is leading to power and cooling limitations, companies have significant interest in energy efficiency as a potential solution to data center issues. Customers are searching to justify their costs on annual electricity costs, cooling costs, and power costs. Utilizing energy efficient equipment and testing results of your data center enable companies to pin point where potential cost-cutting procedures can take place.

On August 2, 2007 in a report to the United States Congress, the Environmental Protection Agency (EPA) estimated that the energy used to power and cool servers and data centers is significant in the United States. It is estimated that the IT sector consumed about 61 billion kilowatt-hours (kWh) in 2006 (1.5 percent of the total U.S. electricity consumption) for a total electricity cost of about $4.5 billion. This total is expected to double over the next five years.

"According to projections from the U.S. Energy Information Administration, electricity generation around the world will nearly double from about 17.3 trillion kilowatt-hours (kWh) in 2005 to 33.3 trillion kWh in 2030." In the case of the U.S., its power grid simply will not be able to keep up with the growth and demand for additional power using conventional means. In the U.S., it's estimated that reduction in peak demand by a mere 5% would yield savings of about $66 billion over 20 years --- to say nothing of the resulting reduction in green house gas emissions that would accompany a 5% peak demand reduction.

Many U.S. utility companies have developed energy rebate programs to provide IT companies incentives to use energy efficient equipment and help lower the power demand for data centers. The energy situation has driven some IT vendors to offer "green" leases for IT equipment that complement utilities' Energy Rebate Programs. Energy rebates can be applied toward leases for new IT equipment. Customers can benefit from lower monthly lease payments, or accept the rebate as a cash infusion for their business or IT project.

Origins for Energy Rebate Programs offered by utilities began with the Non-Residential New Construction (NRNC) program. Pacific Gas and Electric (PG&E) targeted energy savings toward the IT industry (and other commercial businesses). Dozens of utilities are emulating the PG&E programs nationally, and many more utility companies plan to implement an energy rebate program. A basis for the program is the Standard Performance Contract (SPC). SPC offers non-residential customer for installing new, high efficiency equipment or systems. For the period from 2009–2011, PG&E has reserved, for example, $50 million in energy credit incentives for data centers alone. Although consumer awareness of utility company rebates is still emerging, retailers are increasingly gaining the ability to make their customers aware of those rebates through innovative nationwide rebate database services such as GreenOhm.

== Energy rebate application process for utilities ==
A customer applies for energy credit incentive (rebate) prior to new IT equipment installation. An energy savings calculator (usually a spreadsheet analysis) is used to estimate the energy savings and resulting energy rebate based on the initial 12-month installation period of IT equipment. The energy savings calculator may be provided by the local utility, an energy certification partner, or by the customer. Measurements included must be consistent with the program guidelines. No baseline analysis of existing IT equipment is required if PG&E’s Non-Residential New Construction] program is used and the equipment has been pre-certified by PG&E. Other utilities may vary.

Key Services Offered by Energy Certification Partners to Validate Energy Savings and Rebates for IT Projects

Energy Certification Partners are also often referred to as Energy Service Companies, or ESCOs. An ESCO focuses on base-lining, measuring, and verifying energy savings and rebate incentives for the installation of new, energy efficient equipment in data centers. The following are key services that should be provided by the Energy Certification Partner selected by the customer:

• Provide help completing the utilities’ applications for energy savings incentives (rebates).

• Perform all spreadsheet development, document assumptions and produce an energy calculator according to utilities’ requirements, which will vary.

• Document the assumptions in the energy savings spreadsheet and summarize the approach taken to utilities.

• Develop an additional validation report (if needed) to describe the energy savings and resulting rebate due to the installation of more efficient IT equipment and/or data center.

• Interface utilities to negotiate and obtain qualification for incentive rebates.

• Assist customer in securing rebate check from their utility.

== Energy rebate eligibility for IT projects ==
Generally, there are four eligible energy savings measurements for IT equipment, all of which can be combined. These energy savings incentives are offered by PG&E in 2009:

1) IT Equipment Energy (Fans, Motors, Variable Speed Drives, Air Compression Systems)

• Rebate is based on the first year’s energy savings calculated

• 9 cent incentive per kWh saved

• Varies by utility

2) HVAC Energy (Air Conditioning and Refrigeration)

• Rebate is based on the first year’s energy savings calculated

• 15 cent incentive per kWh saved

• Varies by utility

3) On-Peak Demand Reduction

• Based on reduction of kW during On-Peak Demand

• Varies by utility

4) Server Reduction due to Consolidation and/or Virtualization

• Rebate is based on the number of physical servers reduced

• Up to a $200 rebate for each server removed

• Pre- and post-inspection required

• Varies by utility

Maximum allowable energy rebates offered by qualifying utilities under the Non-Residential New Construction program will vary somewhat. For example, PG&E offers a per-site maximum rebate of $500,000; San Diego Gas & Electric (SDG&E) offers a per-site maximum rebate of $350,000. Under customized energy savings incentive programs, such as the Energy Savings Bid from San Diego Gas & Electric, there are no caps on energy rebates.

== Three programs utility companies offer for IT projects ==
Utilities with actively funded IT rebate programs typically offer these three programs to match the planned IT project requirements. PG&E, for example, offers incentives and rebates for retrofit projects as well as incentives and design assistance for new construction projects to help businesses save money and manage energy costs. Custom bid programs are also available.

Program #1: Non-Residential New Construction (NRNC) or Savings By Design

Non-Residential New Construction (NRNC), also known in California as Savings By Design is a program for commercial, industrial, high tech and agricultural customers that encourages energy efficient building and process design and construction. The program popularized in California by four investor-owned utilities under the auspices of the California Public Utilities Commission (CPUC), offers owners and their design teams a variety of services and follows the protocol outlined in the NRNC/Savings By Design Program.

Program #2: Non-Residential Retrofit (NRR) Program

Customers installing new IT equipment can save electricity costs by qualifying for customized incentives for business energy efficiency retrofit projects involving the installation of high efficiency equipment or data center facilities. Total incentive payments (rebates) are based on actual reduction in energy usage. Customers and/or their Energy Certification Partners may sponsor projects under this approach and can assist with the completion of application forms, confirmation of eligibility, and guidance on any the technical aspects.

Program #3: Custom Bid Program

Customers can receive energy rebates by installing new, energy efficiency equipment. Customers design their own energy-saving project and propose the incentive amount necessary to implement the project. This usually requires more effort and negotiation by the customer and/or Energy Certification Partner, but the potential energy rebates can be greater than those offered through the New Construction or Retrofit programs. Typically, measures applied for through a Custom Bid program cannot overlap other incentive programs such as the New Construction or Retrofit programs. Incentive levels will vary by utility. San Diego Gas and Electric provides an estimated timeline for the application process, which allows customers to understand that a Custom Bid process can require more effort on behalf of the customer and the Energy Certification Partner to qualify for the rebate.

== See also ==
- Electrical energy efficiency on United States farms
- Renewable energy credit
