= Green building in South Africa =

Green building in South Africa is overseen by The Green Building Council of South Africa (launched 2007) which has developed Green Star SA rating tools, based on those developed by the Green Building Council of Australia tools, to provide the property industry with an objective measurement for green buildings and to recognize and reward environmental leadership in the property industry. Each Green Star SA rating tool reflects a different market sector (e.g. office, retail, multi-unit residential, etc.). The first tool developed was Green Star SA - Office which was published in pilot form for public comment in July 2008, with final version 1 release at the Green Building Council of South Africa Convention & Exhibition ’08 on 2–4 November 2008.

South Africa is in the process of incorporating an energy standard (SANS 204) which aims to provide energy-saving practices as a basic standard in the South African context.

Green Building Media (launched in 2007) has also played an instrumental role in green building in South Africa, through their informational portal, as well as their monthly Green Building e-Journal of South Africa, which is sent to professionals within the built environment. They currently hold two annual events which focusing on sustainability; the Green Building Conference and a Retrofitting Seminar.

Dorah Modise is the CEO of the Green Building Council South Africa. Ms Modise took over the reins from outgoing CEO Brian Wilkinson in February 2017.

== EDGE South Africa ==
A new green building certification programme has been brought to South Africa thanks to the Green Building Council South Africa (GBCSA) and its partnership with World Bank Group member, the International Finance Corporation (IFC).

The GBCSA in Cape Town (15 September 2014) the launch of the “EDGE” rating system, to be utilised for homes in South Africa. The launch comes in the wake of the GBCSA’s hugely successful My Green Home education and awareness campaign for the greening of homes, in addition to a detailed market research study jointly led by IFC and the GBCSA on the potential need and impact of EDGE in the South African market.

EDGE, which stands for “Excellence in Design for Greater Efficiencies,” seeks to help facilitate a transformation of the property sector in rapidly urbanising countries by influencing design considerations. To achieve the EDGE standard, minimum savings of 20% energy, water, and embodied energy in materials must be met.

The goal of IFC’s EDGE programme is to help build capacity for developers, banks, and governments to mainstream resource-efficient buildings in rapidly growing economies around the world. With EDGE, builders can assess the most cost-effective ways of bringing green features into their designs, financiers can offer better terms to developers and green mortgages for homeowners, and governments can do their part through incentives and improved regulations.

EDGE has been adapted for the local South African context, especially in light of the SANS 10400 Part XA energy efficiency building code. This code was promulgated for all new buildings in 2011.

Since 2009, IFC has invested more than $600 million in green buildings, including homes, commercial buildings, hotels, and hospitals, both directly and through financial partners. IFC has also provided regulatory advice to the governments of Colombia, Panama, the Philippines, Vietnam, Indonesia, and Bangladesh. As part of its climate strategy, IFC has developed EDGE to encourage resource-efficient building design by proving the business case for building green.
