= Green building in Israel =

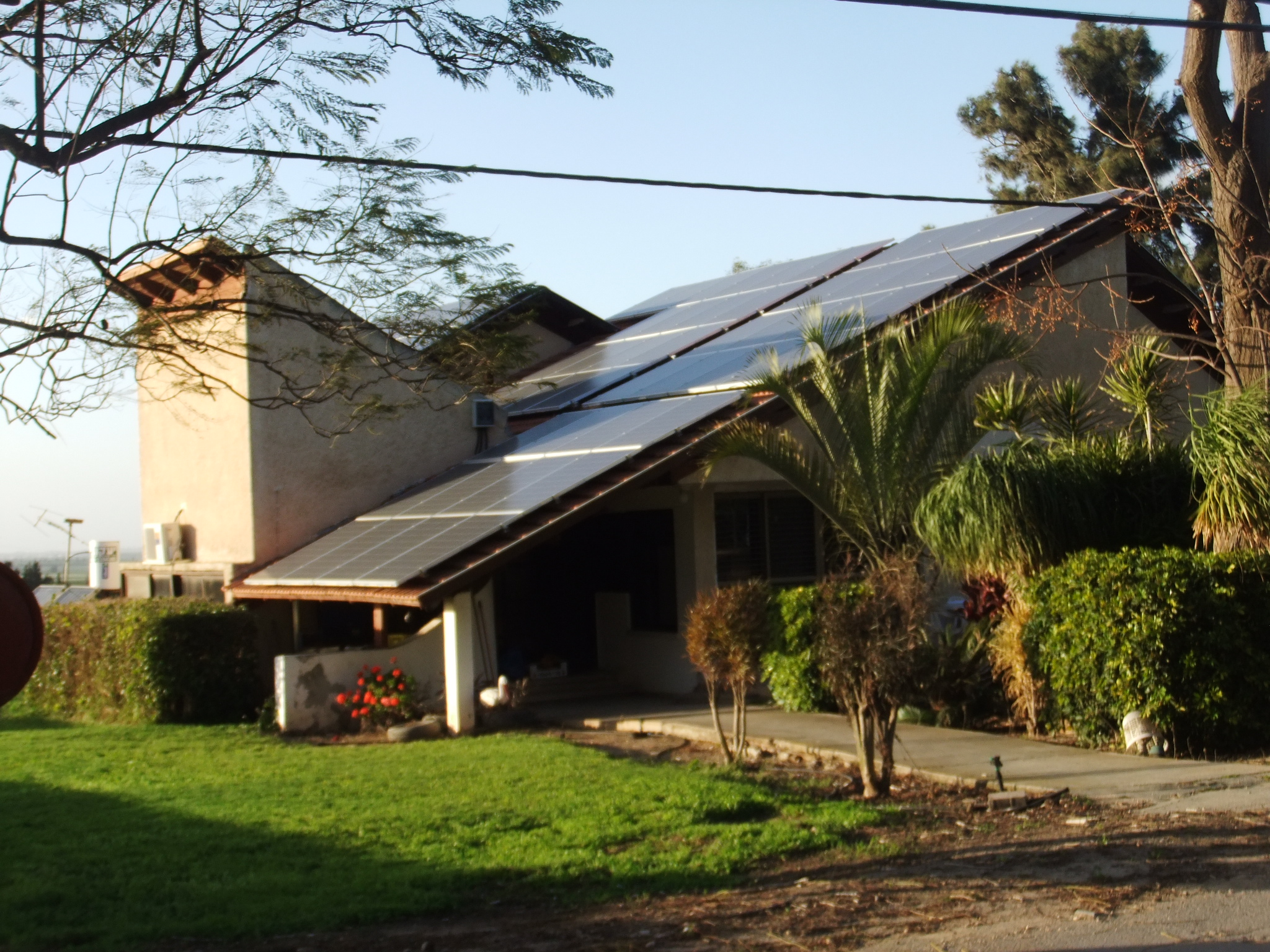
House with solar panels in Moshav Tkuma

Israel has a Green Building Standard for buildings with reduced environmental impact. The standard is based on a point rating system, awarding up to 5 stars based on the number of points achieved (55–100) in 8 categories.

== History ==
Israel has had its own voluntary Green Building Standard (IS-5281) since 2005. While the 2005 version covered only new residential and office buildings, a significantly revised and updated new version was approved in 2011, following pressure from professionals and market players. The new standard written with the help of BRE, the British office that wrote BREEAM, the UK Green Building tool, covers new buildings and buildings under significant renovation. This version was revised in August 2014.

A number of Israeli municipalities are currently using the standard as a mandatory part of their building licensing process. Together with complementary standards 5282 [classification of buildings according to energy use] and 1738 for sustainable products provides a system for evaluating the environmental sustainability of buildings.

United States Green Building Council LEED rating system has been implemented on some building in Israel including the Intel Development Center in Haifa.

== Standard 5281 ==
The Israeli Green Building Standard ('Buildings of Lesser Environmental Harm'), Standard 5281, was upgraded and expanded in 2011 in cooperation with the Ministry of Environmental Protection, the Standards Institute of Israel, the Ministry of Interior, Ministry of Building and Housing and the Israeli Green Building Council. While the old standard only applied to residential and office buildings, the revised version defined seven standards for seven types of buildings: residential, offices, healthcare institutions, public, commercial, education and tourism buildings.

The 5281 standard encompasses issues pertinent to every green building: energy, land, water, building materials, health and welfare of building users, waste, transportation, building site management and innovation. Each issue is divided into sub-categories that include rating and assessment criteria, and the score is determined in accordance with the project's compliance with the requirements.

A building is deemed a 'green building' if it meets the minimal requirements for each of the categories, as well as additional preconditions to minimize the building's "environmental footprint." The standard has five levels, ranging from one star to five stars.

The Israeli Green Building Council (ILGBC) publishes general and technical manuals that provide information on these standards and their implementation.

== See also ==
- Architecture of Israel
- Ministry of Environmental Protection (Israel)
- Environmental issues in Israel
- Energy in Israel
