= Green building =

Environmentally responsible construction principles

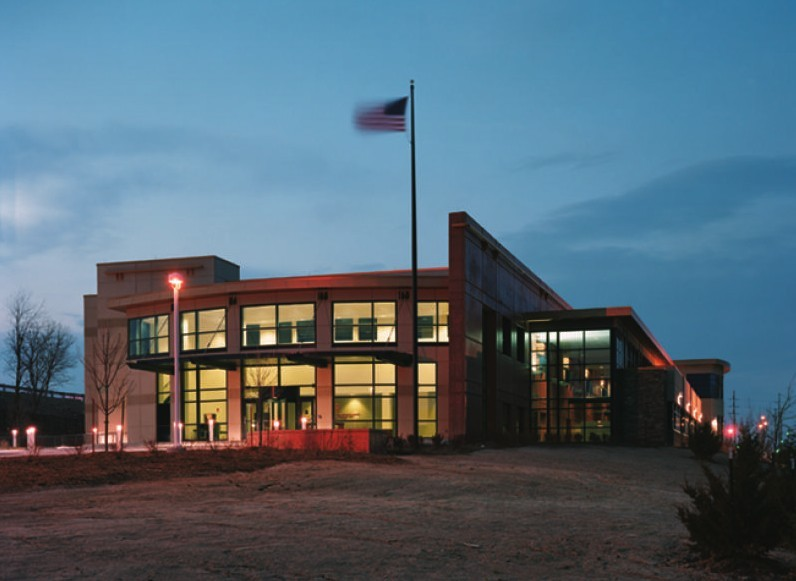
US EPA Kansas City Science & Technology Center. This facility features the following green attributes: LEED 2.0 Gold certified; Green Power; Native Landscaping

Green building (also known as green construction, sustainable building, or eco-friendly building) refers to both a structure and the application of processes that are environmentally responsible and resource-efficient throughout a building's life cycle: from planning to design, construction, operation, maintenance, renovation, and demolition. This requires close cooperation between the contractor, the architects, the engineers, and the client at all project stages. The Green Building practice expands and complements the classical building design concerns of economy, utility, durability, and comfort. Green building also refers to saving resources to the maximum extent, including energy saving, land saving, water saving, material saving, etc., during the whole life cycle of the building, protecting the environment and reducing pollution, providing people with healthy, comfortable and efficient use of space, and being in harmony with nature. Buildings that live in harmony; green building technology focuses on low consumption, high efficiency, economy, environmental protection, integration and optimization.

Leadership in Energy and Environmental Design (LEED) is a set of rating systems for the design, construction, operation, and maintenance of green buildings, developed by the U.S. Green Building Council. The Green Building Initiative (GBI) is an American National Standards Institute (ANSI) accredited standards developer and the provider of numerous green building assessments and certifications, including Green Globes. Other certification systems that confirm the sustainability of buildings are the British BREEAM (Building Research Establishment Environmental Assessment Method) for buildings and large-scale developments or the DGNB System (Deutsche Gesellschaft für Nachhaltiges Bauen e.V.) which benchmarks the sustainability performance of buildings, indoor environments, and districts. Currently, the World Green Building Council is researching the effects of green buildings on the health and productivity of their users and is working with the World Bank to promote green buildings in Emerging Markets through EDGE (Excellence in Design for Greater Efficiencies) Market Transformation Program and certification. There are also other tools such as NABERS or Green Star in Australia, Global Sustainability Assessment System (GSAS) used in the Middle East and the Green Building Index (GBI) predominantly used in Malaysia.

Building information modeling (BIM) is a process involving the generation and management of digital representations of the physical and functional characteristics of places. Building information models (BIMs) are files (often, but not always in proprietary formats and containing proprietary data) which can be extracted, exchanged, or networked to support decision-making regarding a building or other built asset. Current BIM software is used by individuals, businesses, and government agencies who plan, design, construct, operate, and maintain diverse physical infrastructures, such as water, refuse, electricity, gas, communication utilities, roads, railways, bridges, ports, and tunnels.

Although new technologies are constantly being developed to complement current practices in creating greener structures, the common objective of green buildings is to reduce the overall impact of the built environment on human health and the natural environment by:

- Efficiently using energy, water, and other resources
- Protecting occupant health and improving employee productivity (see healthy building)
- Reducing waste, pollution, and environmental degradation

Natural building is a similar concept, usually on a smaller scale and focusing on the use of locally available natural materials. Other related topics include sustainable design and green architecture. Sustainability may be defined as meeting the needs of present generations without compromising the ability of future generations to meet their needs. Although some green building programs do not address the issue of retrofitting existing homes, others do, especially through public schemes for energy efficient refurbishment. Green construction principles can easily be applied to retrofit work as well as new construction.

A 2009 report by the U.S. General Services Administration found that 12 sustainably designed buildings cost less to operate and have excellent energy performance. In addition, occupants were overall more satisfied with these buildings than those in typical commercial buildings. These are eco-friendly buildings.

== Reducing environmental impact ==
Buildings represent a large part of energy, electricity, water, and materials consumption. As of 2020, they account for 37% of global energy use and energy-related CO_{2} emissions, which the United Nations estimates contributed to 33% of overall worldwide emissions. Including the manufacturing of building materials, the global CO_{2} emissions were 39%. If new technologies in construction are not adopted during this time of rapid growth, emissions could double by 2050, according to the United Nations Environment Program.

Glass buildings, especially all-glass skyscrapers, contribute significantly to climate change due to their energy inefficiency. While these structures are visually appealing and allow abundant natural light, they also trap heat, necessitating increased use of air conditioning systems, which contributes to higher carbon emissions. Experts advocate for design modifications and potential restrictions on all-glass edifices to mitigate their detrimental environmental impact.

Buildings account for a large amount of land. According to the National Resources Inventory, approximately 107 million acres (430,000 km^{2}) of land in the United States are developed. The International Energy Agency released a publication that estimated that existing buildings are responsible for more than 40% of the world's total primary energy consumption and for 24% of global carbon dioxide emissions.

According to the Global Status Report from the year 2016, buildings consume more than 30% of all produced energy. The report states that "Under a below 2°C trajectory, effective action to improve building energy efficiency could limit building final energy demand to just above current levels, meaning that the average energy intensity of the global building stock would decrease by more than 80% by 2050".

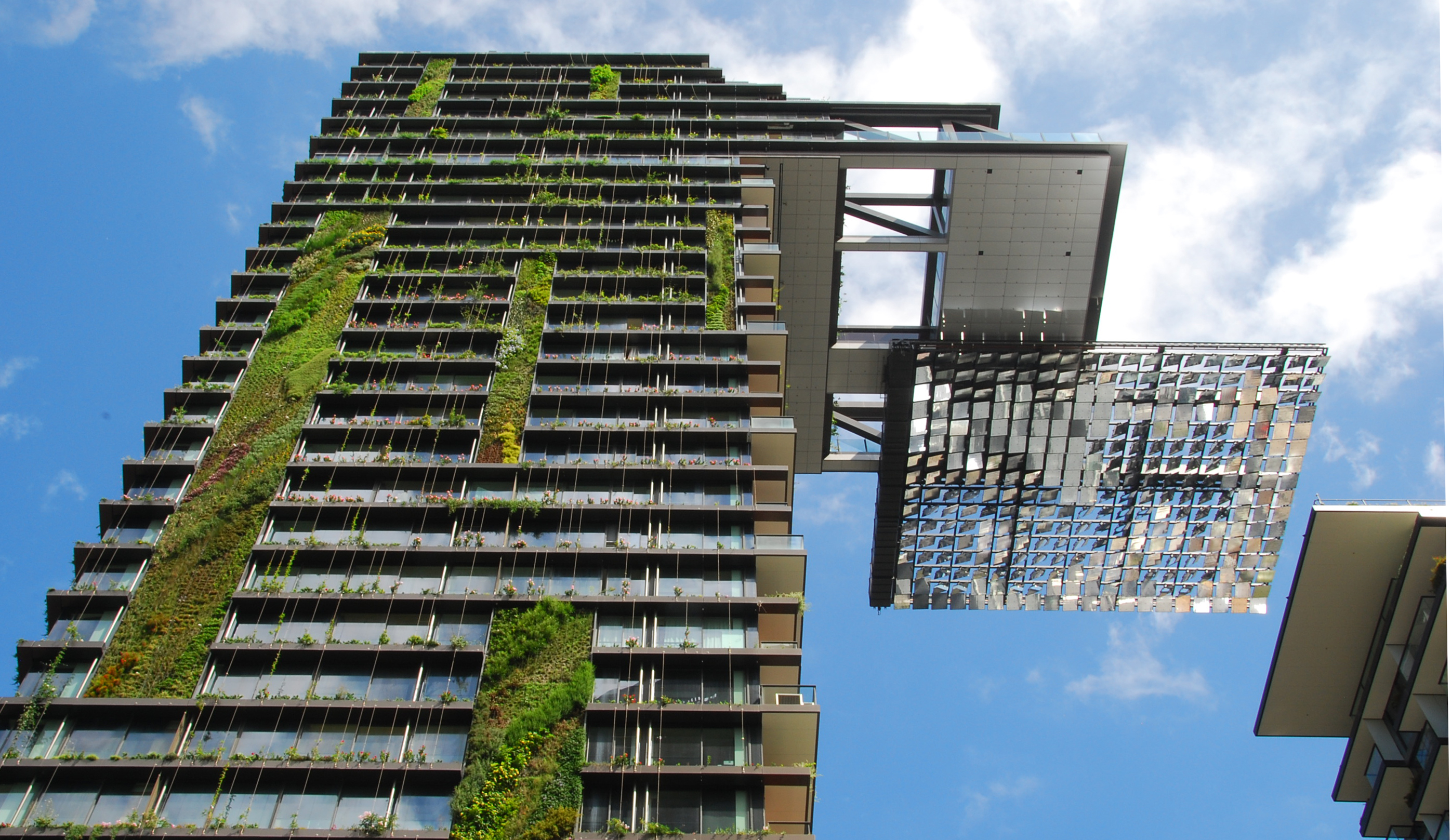
Hanging gardens of One Central Park, Sydney

Green building practices aim to reduce the environmental impact of building as the building sector has the greatest potential to deliver significant cuts in emissions at little or no cost. General guidelines can be summarized as follows: Every building should be as small as possible. Avoid contributing to sprawl, even if the most energy-efficient, environmentally sound methods are used in design and construction. Bioclimatic design principles are able to reduce energy expenditure and by extension, carbon emissions. Bioclimatic design is a method of building design that takes local climate into account to create comfortable conditions within the structure. This could be as simple as constructing a different shape for the building envelope or facing the building towards the south to maximize solar exposure for energy or lighting purposes. Given the limitations of city-planned construction, bioclimatic principles may be employed on a lesser scale; however it is still an effective passive method to reduce environmental impact.

== Goals of green building ==
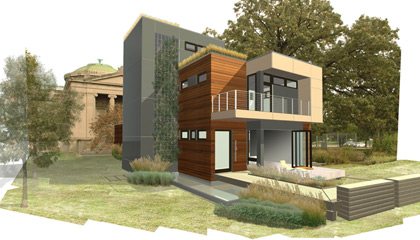
Blu Homes mkSolaire, a green building designed by Michelle Kaufmann.

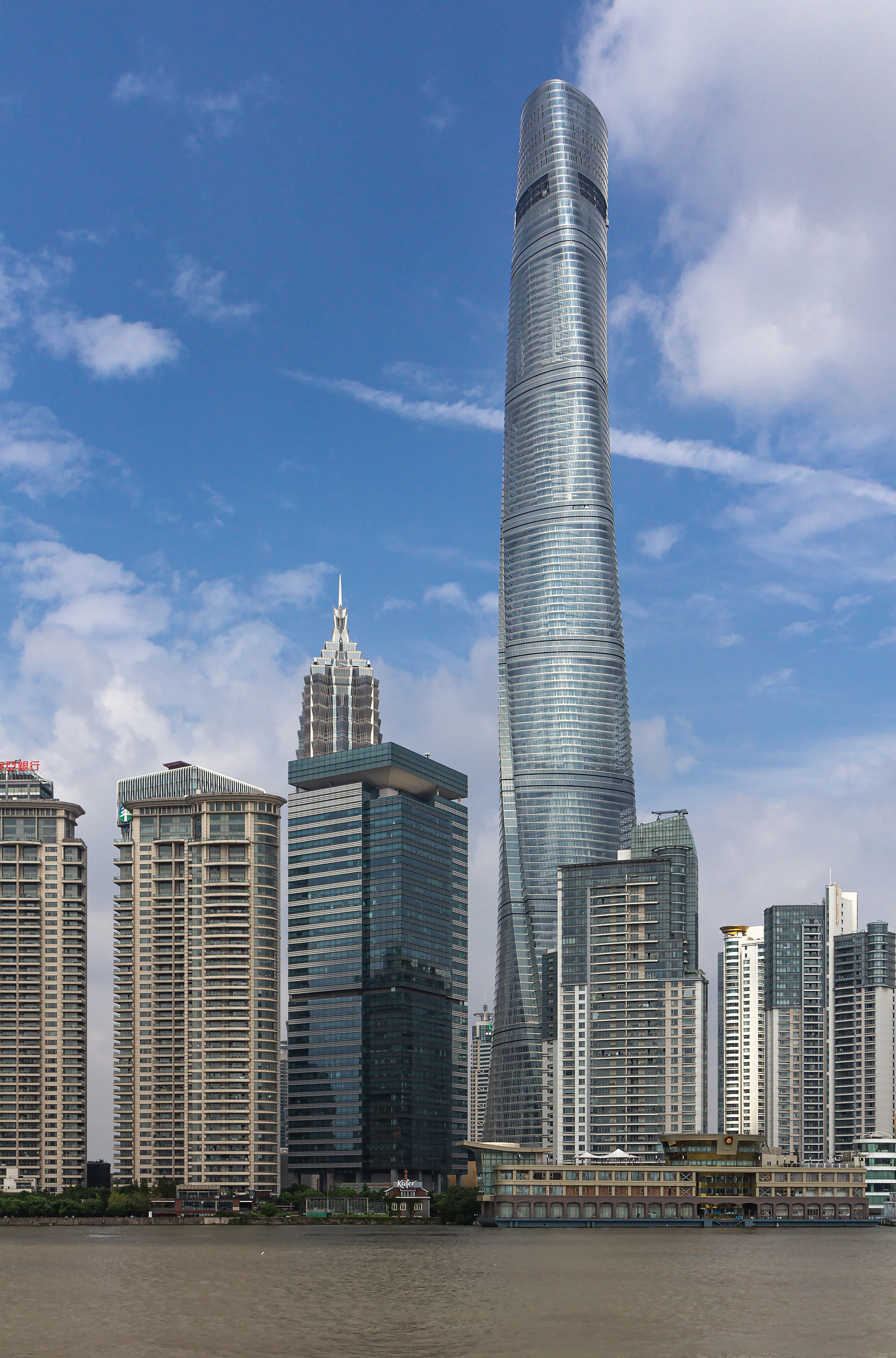
Shanghai Tower, the tallest and largest LEED Platinum certified building in the world since 2015.

The concept of sustainable development can be traced to the energy (especially fossil oil) crisis and environmental pollution concerns of the 1960s and 1970s. The Rachel Carson book, Silent Spring, published in 1962, is considered to be one of the first efforts to describe sustainable development as related to green building. The green building movement in the U.S. originated from the need and desire for more energy efficient and environmentally friendly construction practices. There are a number of motives for building green, including environmental, economic, and social benefits. However, modern sustainability initiatives call for an integrated and synergistic design in both new construction and in the retrofitting of existing structures. Also known as sustainable design, this approach integrates the building life-cycle with each green practice employed with a design purpose to create a synergy among the practices used.

Green building brings together a vast array of practices, techniques, and skills to reduce and ultimately eliminate the impacts of buildings on the environment and human health. It often emphasizes taking advantage of renewable resources, e.g., using sunlight through passive solar, active solar, and photovoltaic equipment, and using plants and trees through green roofs, rain gardens, and reduction of rainwater run-off. Many other techniques are used, such as using low-impact building materials or using packed gravel or permeable concrete instead of conventional concrete or asphalt to enhance replenishment of groundwater.

While the practices or technologies employed in green building are constantly evolving and may differ from region to region, fundamental principles persist from which the method is derived: siting and structure design efficiency, energy efficiency, water efficiency, materials efficiency, indoor environmental quality enhancement, operations and maintenance optimization and waste and toxics reduction. The essence of green building is an optimization of one or more of these principles. Also, with the proper synergistic design, individual green building technologies may work together to produce a greater cumulative effect.

On the aesthetic side of green architecture or sustainable design is the philosophy of designing a building that is in harmony with the natural features and resources surrounding the site. There are several key steps in designing sustainable buildings: specify 'green' building materials from local sources, reduce loads, optimize systems, and generate on-site renewable energy.

=== Life cycle assessment ===
A life cycle assessment (LCA) can help avoid a narrow outlook on environmental, social, and economic concerns by assessing a full range of impacts associated with all cradle-to-grave stages of a process: from extraction of raw materials through materials processing, manufacture, distribution, use, repair, and maintenance, and disposal or recycling. Impacts taken into account include (among others) embodied energy, global warming potential, resource use, air pollution, water pollution, and waste.

In terms of green building, the last few years have seen a shift away from a prescriptive approach, which assumes that certain prescribed practices are better for the environment, toward the scientific evaluation of actual performance through LCA.

Although LCA is widely recognized as the best way to evaluate the environmental impacts of buildings (ISO 14040 provides a recognized LCA methodology), it is not yet a consistent requirement of green building rating systems and codes, despite the fact that embodied energy and other life cycle impacts are critical to the design of environmentally responsible buildings.

In North America, LCA is rewarded to some extent in the Green Globes rating system, and is part of the new American National Standard based on Green Globes, ANSI/GBI 01-2010: Green Building Protocol for Commercial Buildings. LCA is also included as a pilot credit in the LEED system, though a decision has not been made as to whether it will be incorporated fully into the next major revision. The state of California also included LCA as a voluntary measure in its 2010 draft Green Building Standards Code.

Although LCA is often perceived as overly complex and time-consuming for regular use by design professionals, research organizations such as BRE in the UK and the Athena Sustainable Materials Institute in North America are working to make it more accessible.

In the UK, the BRE Green Guide to Specifications offers ratings for 1,500 building materials based on LCA.

=== Siting and structure design efficiency ===
The foundation of any construction project is rooted in the concept and design stages. The concept stage, in fact, is one of the major steps in a project life cycle, as it has the largest impact on cost and performance. In designing environmentally optimal buildings, the objective is to minimize the total environmental impact associated with all life-cycle stages of the building project.

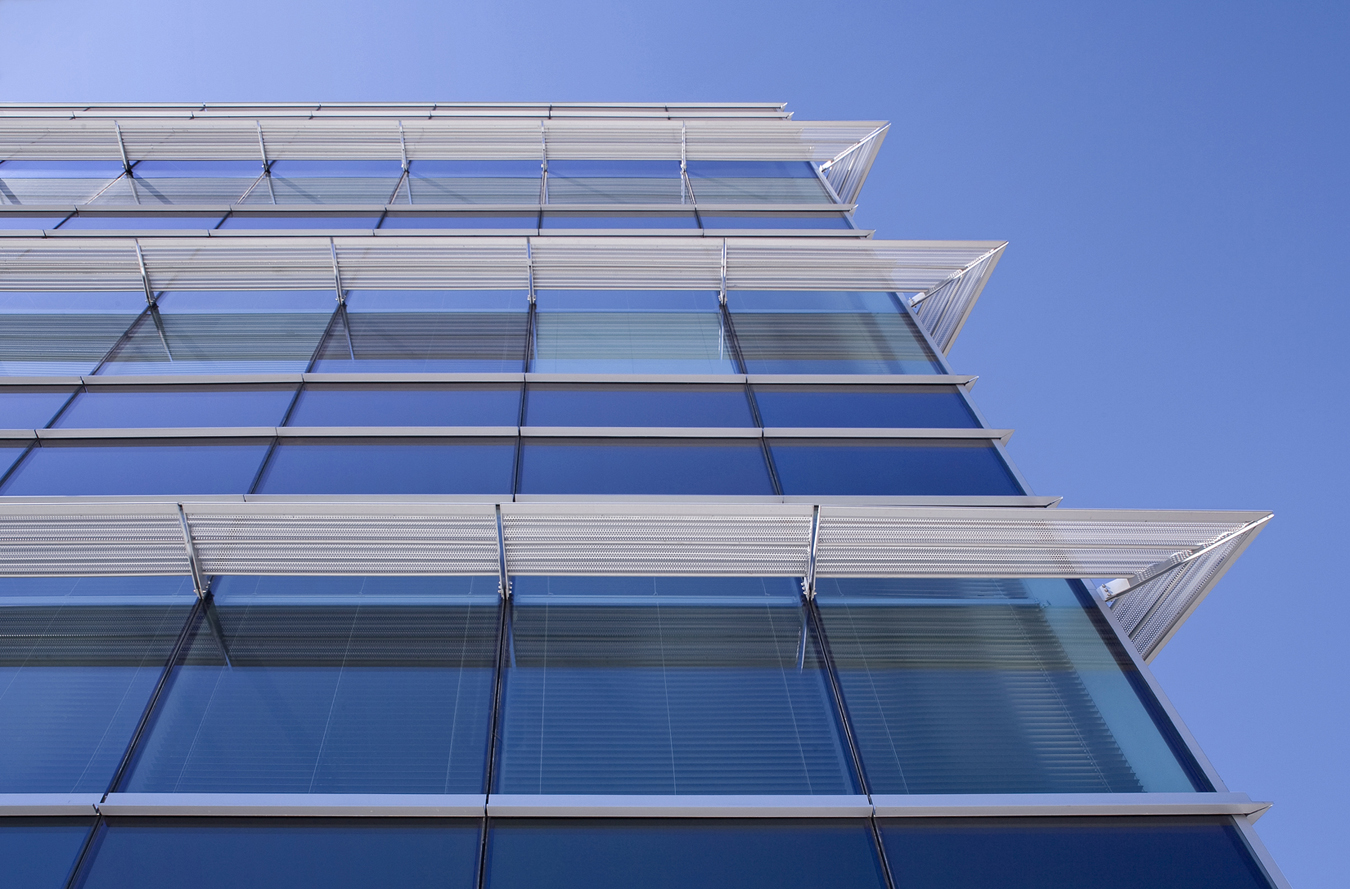
Exterior Light Shelves - Green Office Building, Denver, Colorado

However, building as a process is not as streamlined as an industrial process, and varies from one building to the other, never repeating itself identically. In addition, buildings are much more complex products, composed of a multitude of materials and components, each constituting various design variables to be decided at the design stage. A variation of every design variable may affect the environment during all the building's relevant life-cycle stages.

=== Energy efficiency ===
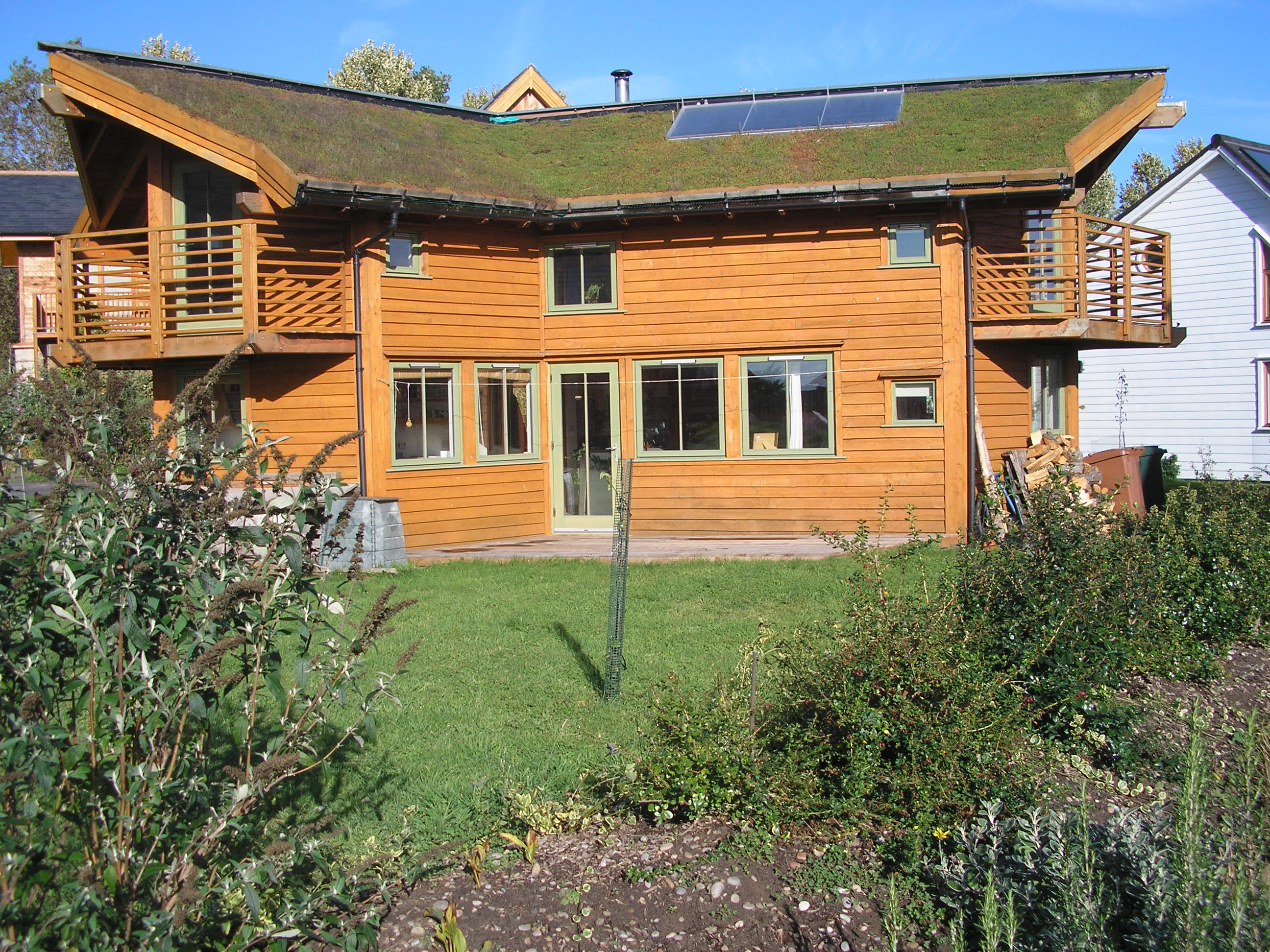
An eco-house at Findhorn Ecovillage with a turf roof and solar panels

Green buildings often include measures to reduce energy consumption–both the embodied energy required to extract, process, transport, and install building materials and operating energy to provide services such as heating and power for equipment.

As high-performance buildings use less operating energy, embodied energy has assumed much greater importance – and may make up as much as 30% of the overall life cycle energy consumption. Studies such as the U.S. LCI Database Project show buildings built primarily with wood will have a lower embodied energy than those built primarily with brick, concrete, or steel.

To reduce operating energy use, designers use details that reduce air leakage through the building envelope (the barrier between conditioned and unconditioned space). They also specify high-performance windows and extra insulation in walls, ceilings, and floors. Another strategy, passive solar building design, is often implemented in low-energy homes. Designers orient windows and walls and place awnings, porches, and trees to shade windows and roofs during the summer while maximizing solar gain in the winter. In addition, effective window placement (daylighting) can provide more natural light and lessen the need for electric lighting during the day. Solar water heating further reduces energy costs.

Onsite generation of renewable energy through solar power, wind power, hydro power, or biomass can significantly reduce the environmental impact of the building. Power generation is generally the most expensive feature to add to a building.

Energy efficiency for green buildings can be evaluated from either numerical or non-numerical methods. These include the use of simulation modelling, analytical or statistical tools.

In a report published in April 2024, the International Energy Agency (IEA) highlighted that buildings are responsible for about 30% of global final energy consumption and over 50% of electricity demand. It noted the tripling of heat pump sales from 2015 to 2022, electric cars accounting for 20% of 2023 vehicle sales, and a potential doubling of China's peak electricity demand by mid-century. India's air conditioner ownership could see a tenfold rise by 2050, causing a sixfold increase in peak electricity demand, which could be halved with efficient practices. By 2050, demand response measures might lower household electricity bills by 7% to 12% in advanced economies and nearly 20% in developing ones, with smart device installations nearly doubling by 2030. The US could see a 116 GW reduction in peak demand, 80 million tonnes less CO_{2} per year by 2030, and save between US$100 billion and US$200 billion over twenty years with grid-interactive buildings. In Alabama, a smart neighborhood demonstrated 35% to 45% energy savings compared to traditional homes.

=== Water efficiency ===
Reducing water consumption and protecting water quality are key objectives in sustainable building. One critical issue of water consumption is that in many areas, the demands on the supplying aquifer exceed its ability to replenish itself. To the maximum extent feasible, facilities should increase their dependence on water that is collected, used, purified, and reused on-site. The protection and conservation of water throughout the life of a building may be accomplished by designing for dual plumbing that recycles water in toilet flushing or by using water for washing cars. Waste water may be minimized by utilizing water-conserving fixtures such as ultra-low flush toilets and low-flow shower heads. Bidets help eliminate the use of toilet paper, reducing sewer traffic and increasing possibilities of re-using water on-site. Point of use water treatment and heating improves both water quality and energy efficiency while reducing the amount of water in circulation. The use of non-sewage and greywater for on-site use such as site-irrigation will minimize demands on the local aquifer.

Large commercial buildings with water and energy efficiency can qualify for an LEED Certification. Philadelphia's Comcast Center is the tallest building in Philadelphia. It is also one of the tallest buildings in the USA that is LEED Certified. Their environmental engineering consists of a hybrid central chilled water system that cools floor-by-floor with steam instead of water. Burn's Mechanical set up the entire renovation of the 58-story, 1.4 million square foot skyscraper.

=== Materials and sustainable architecture ===
The incorporation of green building materials in sustainable architecture significantly reduces the environmental impacts of construction and operation. Green building materials are made of sustainable properties such as renewable resources, lower energy consumption, and minimal environmental degradation. They also allow for the reduction of the depletion of natural resources.

For example, green building materials in insulation can drastically reduce the need to depend on HVAC units, in turn reducing energy consumption. There is an emphasis on using materials and resources more efficiently throughout their life cycle beginning from construction to demolition. In order to conserve natural resources, the usage of recycled materials is crucial which will bring forth many advantages including the reduction of environmental impacts when it comes to the extraction of the resource since it will no longer create the demand for constant extraction. Reduction of waste and pollution on-site is equally as important by implementing the usage of a modular design which allows for the prefabrication of materials off-site reducing on-site waste. The use of zero-waste materials will be preferred which will reduce the release of pollutants on-site as well. Health benefits are also associated with the implementation of these materials. Green building materials promote well-being for the occupants of the building.

When it comes to energy efficiency, green building materials allow for a passive design strategy which optimizes the building's orientation, thermal mass, and natural ventilation in order to minimize energy use for heating, cooling, and lighting. This can be in the form of strategically placing windows and shading devices which would enhance natural daylight and reduce the need for artificial lighting. One main focus of green building materials is the durability-to-resource ratio which refers to the longevity of the materials. If the materials have a long life span then there will be a reduced need for frequent replacements or repairs. These materials can also be given a new purpose after they have been used. Some of the challenges associated with green building materials include a high initial cost and limited availability and accessibility. However, in the long run, green building materials offer long-term savings because of their effects of reduced consumption, lower maintenance costs, and extended material life spans.

=== Materials efficiency ===
Building materials typically considered 'green' include lumber (that has been certified to a third-party standard), rapidly renewable plant materials (like bamboo and straw), dimension stone, recycled stone, hempcrete, recycled metal (see: copper sustainability and recyclability), and other non-toxic, reusable, renewable, and/or recyclable products. Materials with lower embodied energy can be used in substitution for common building materials with high degrees of energy consumption and carbon/harmful emissions. For concrete a high performance self-healing version is available, however options with lower yields of pollutive waste entertain ideas of upcycling and congregate supplementing; replacing traditional concrete mixes with slag, production waste, and aggregates. Insulation also sees multiple angles for substitution. Commonly used fiberglass has competition from other eco-friendly, low-energy-embodied insulators with similar or higher R-values (per inch of thickness) at a competitive price. Sheep wool, cellulose, and ThermaCork perform more efficiently; however, use may be limited by transportation or installation costs.

Furthermore, embodied energy comparisons can help deduce the selection of building material and its efficiency. Wood production emits less CO_{2} than concrete and steel if produced in a sustainable way just as steel can be produced more sustainably through improvements in technology (e.g. EAF) and energy recycling/carbon capture(an underutilized potential for systematically storing carbon in the built environment).

The EPA (Environmental Protection Agency) also suggests using recycled industrial goods, such as coal combustion products, foundry sand, and demolition debris in construction projects. Energy-efficient building materials and appliances are promoted in the United States through energy rebate programs.

A 2022 report from the Boston Consulting Group found that investments in developing greener forms of cement, iron, and steel lead to bigger greenhouse gas reductions compared with investments in electricity and aviation. In addition, the process of making cement without producing CO_{2} is unavoidable. However, using pozzolans clinkers can reduce CO_{2} emission while in the process of making cement.

=== Indoor environmental quality enhancement ===
The Indoor Environmental Quality (IEQ) category in LEED standards, one of the five environmental categories, was created to enhance comfort, well-being, and productivity of occupants. The LEED IEQ category addresses design and construction guidelines especially: indoor air quality (IAQ), thermal quality, and lighting quality.

Indoor Air Quality seeks to reduce volatile organic compounds, or VOCs, and other air impurities such as microbial contaminants. Buildings rely on a properly designed ventilation system (passively/naturally or mechanically powered) to provide adequate ventilation of cleaner air from outdoors or recirculated, filtered air as well as isolating operations (kitchens, dry cleaners, etc.) from other occupancies. During the design and construction process choosing construction materials and interior finish products with zero or low VOC emissions will improve IAQ. Most building materials and cleaning/maintenance products emit gases, some of them toxic, such as many VOCs including formaldehyde. These gases can have a detrimental impact on occupants' health, comfort, and productivity. Avoiding these products will increase a building's IEQ. LEED, HQE and Green Star contain specifications on use of low-emitting interior. Draft LEED 2012 is about to expand the scope of the involved products. BREEAM limits formaldehyde emissions, no other VOCs. MAS Certified Green is a registered trademark to delineate low VOC-emitting products in the marketplace. The MAS Certified Green Program ensures that any potentially hazardous chemicals released from manufactured products have been thoroughly tested and meet rigorous standards established by independent toxicologists to address recognized long-term health concerns. These IAQ standards have been adopted by and incorporated into the following programs:

- The United States Green Building Council (USGBC) in its LEED rating system
- The California Department of Public Health (CDPH) in its Section 01350 standards
- The Collaborative for High Performance Schools (CHPS) in its Best Practices Manual
- The Business and Institutional Furniture Manufacturers Association (BIFMA) in its level® sustainability standard.

Also important to indoor air quality is the control of moisture accumulation (dampness) to inhibit mold growth, bacteria, and viruses, as well as dust mites and other organisms and microbiological pathogens. Water intrusion through a building's envelope or water condensing on cold surfaces on the building's interior can enhance and sustain microbial growth. A well-insulated and tightly sealed envelope will reduce moisture problems, but adequate ventilation is also necessary to eliminate moisture from sources indoors including human metabolic processes, cooking, bathing, cleaning, and other activities.

Personal temperature and airflow control over the HVAC system coupled with a properly designed building envelope will also aid in increasing a building's thermal quality. Creating a high-performance luminous environment through the careful integration of daylight and electrical light sources will improve the lighting quality and energy performance of a structure.

Solid wood products, particularly flooring, are often specified in environments where occupants are known to have allergies to dust or other particulates. Wood itself is considered to be hypoallergenic, and its smooth surfaces prevent the buildup of particles common in soft finishes like carpet. The Asthma and Allergy Foundation of America recommends hardwood, vinyl, linoleum tile or slate flooring instead of carpet. The use of wood products can also improve air quality by absorbing or releasing moisture in the air to moderate humidity.

Interactions among all the indoor components and the occupants together form the processes that determine the indoor air quality. Extensive investigation of such processes is the subject of indoor air scientific research and is well documented in the journal Indoor Air.

=== Operations and maintenance optimization ===
No matter how sustainable a building may have been in its design and construction, it can only remain so if it is operated responsibly and maintained properly. Ensuring operations and maintenance(O&M) personnel are part of the project's planning and development process will help retain the green criteria designed at the onset of the project. Every aspect of green building is integrated into the O&M phase of a building's life. The addition of new green technologies also falls on the O&M staff. Although the goal of waste reduction may be applied during the design, construction and demolition phases of a building's life cycle, it is in the O&M phase that green practices such as recycling and air quality enhancement take place. O&M staff should aim to establish best practices in energy efficiency, resource conservation, ecologically sensitive products and other sustainable practices. Education of building operators and occupants is key to effective implementation of sustainable strategies in O&M services.

=== Waste reduction ===
Green architecture also seeks to reduce waste of energy, water and materials used during construction. For example, in California nearly 60% of the state's waste comes from commercial buildings. During the construction phase, one goal should be to reduce the amount of material going to landfills. Well-designed buildings also help reduce the amount of waste generated by the occupants as well, by providing on-site solutions such as compost bins to reduce matter going to landfills.

To reduce the amount of wood that goes to landfill, Neutral Alliance (a coalition of government, NGOs and the forest industry) created the website dontwastewood.com. The site includes a variety of resources for regulators, municipalities, developers, contractors, owner/operators and individuals/homeowners looking for information on wood recycling.

When buildings reach the end of their useful life, they are typically demolished and hauled to landfills. Deconstruction is a method of harvesting what is commonly considered "waste" and reclaiming it into useful building material. Extending the useful life of a structure also reduces waste – building materials such as wood that are light and easy to work with make renovations easier.

To reduce the impact on wells or water treatment plants, several options exist. "Greywater", wastewater from sources such as dishwashing or washing machines, can be used for subsurface irrigation, or if treated, for non-potable purposes, e.g., to flush toilets and wash cars. Rainwater collectors are used for similar purposes.

Centralized wastewater treatment systems can be costly and use a lot of energy. An alternative to this process is converting waste and wastewater into fertilizer, which avoids these costs and shows other benefits. By collecting human waste at the source and running it to a semi-centralized biogas plant with other biological waste, liquid fertilizer can be produced. This concept was demonstrated by a settlement in Lübeck Germany in the late 1990s. Practices like these provide soil with organic nutrients and create carbon sinks that remove carbon dioxide from the atmosphere, offsetting greenhouse gas emission. Producing artificial fertilizer is also more costly in energy than this process.

=== Reduce impact on the electricity network ===
Electricity networks are built based on peak demand (another name is peak load). Peak demand is measured in the units of watts (W). It shows how fast electrical energy is consumed. Residential electricity is often charged on electrical energy (kilowatt hour, kWh). Green buildings or sustainable buildings are often capable of saving electrical energy but not necessarily reducing peak demand.

When sustainable building features are designed, constructed and operated efficiently, peak demand can be reduced so that there is less desire for electricity network expansion and there is less impact on carbon emission and climate change. These sustainable features can be good orientation, sufficient indoor thermal mass, good insulation, photovoltaic panels, thermal or electrical energy storage systems, smart building (home) energy management systems.

== Cost and payoff ==
The most criticized issue about constructing environmentally friendly buildings is the price. Photovoltaics, new appliances, and modern technologies tend to cost more money. Most green buildings cost a premium of less than 2%, but yield 10 times as much over the entire life of the building. Regarding the financial benefits of green building, "Over 20 years, the financial payback typically exceeds the additional cost of greening by a factor of 4-6 times. And broader benefits, such as reductions in greenhouse gases (GHGs) and other pollutants have large positive impacts on surrounding communities and on the planet." The stigma is between the knowledge of up-front cost vs. life-cycle cost. The savings in money come from more efficient use of utilities which result in decreased energy bills. It is projected that different sectors could save $130 billion on energy bills. Also, higher worker or student productivity can be factored into savings.

Numerous studies have shown the measurable benefit of green building initiatives on worker productivity. In general, it has been found that "there is a direct correlation between increased productivity and employees who love being in their work space." Specifically, worker productivity can be significantly impacted by certain aspects of green building design such as improved lighting, reduction of pollutants, advanced ventilation systems and the use of non-toxic building materials. In "The Business Case for Green Building", the U.S. Green Building Council gives another specific example of how commercial energy retrofits increase worker health and thus productivity, "People in the U.S. spend about 90% of their time indoors. EPA studies indicate indoor levels of pollutants may be up to ten times higher than outdoor levels. LEED-certified buildings are designed to have healthier, cleaner indoor environmental quality, which means health benefits for occupants."

Studies have shown that over a 20-year life period, some green buildings have yielded $53 to $71 per square foot back on investment. Confirming the rentability of green building investments, further studies of the commercial real estate market have found that LEED and Energy Star certified buildings achieve significantly higher rents, sale prices and occupancy rates as well as lower capitalization rates, potentially reflecting lower investment risk.

== Regulation and operation ==
As a result of the increased interest in green building concepts and practices, a number of organizations have developed standards, codes and rating systems for use by government regulators, building professionals and consumers. In some cases, codes are written so local governments can adopt them as bylaws to reduce the local environmental impact of buildings.

Green building rating systems such as BREEAM (United Kingdom), LEED (United States and Canada), DGNB (Germany), CASBEE (Japan), and VERDE^{GBCe} (Spain), GRIHA (India) help consumers determine a structure's level of environmental performance. They award credits for optional building features that support green design in categories such as location and maintenance of the building site, conservation of water, energy, and building materials, and occupant comfort and health. The number of credits generally determines the level of achievement.

Green building codes and standards, such as the International Code Council's draft International Green Construction Code, are sets of rules created by standards development organizations that establish minimum requirements for elements of green building such as materials or heating and cooling.

The new version of the European Construction Products Regulation (PCR) contains elements of Life Cycle Analysis and verification of Environmental Product Declarations under the "System 3+" process.

Some of the major building environmental assessment tools currently in use include:

- United States: International Green Construction Code (IGCC)

== Green neighborhoods and villages ==
At the beginning of the 21st century, efforts were made to implement the principles of green building, not only for individual buildings, but also for neighborhoods and villages. The intent is to create zero-energy neighborhoods and villages, which means they're going to create all the energy on their own. They will also reuse waste, implement sustainable transportation, and produce their own food. Green villages have been identified as a way to decentralize sustainable climate practices, which may prove key in areas with high rural or scattered village populations, such as India, where 74% of the population lives in over 600,000 different villages.

== International frameworks and assessment tools ==
=== IPCC Fourth Assessment Report ===
Climate Change 2007, the Fourth Assessment Report (AR4) of the United Nations Intergovernmental Panel on Climate Change (IPCC), is the fourth in a series of such reports. The IPCC was established by the World Meteorological Organization (WMO) and the United Nations Environment Programme (UNEP) to assess scientific, technical and socio-economic information concerning climate change, its potential effects and options for adaptation and mitigation.

=== UNEP and climate change ===
United Nations Environment Program UNEP works to facilitate the transition to low-carbon societies, support climate proofing efforts, improve understanding of climate change science, and raise public awareness about this global challenge.

=== GHG Indicator ===
The Greenhouse Gas Indicator: UNEP Guidelines for Calculating Greenhouse Gas Emissions for Businesses and Non-Commercial Organizations

=== Agenda 21 ===
Agenda 21 is a programme run by the United Nations (UN) related to sustainable development. It is a comprehensive blueprint of action to be taken globally, nationally and locally by organizations of the UN, governments, and major groups in every area in which humans impact on the environment. The number 21 refers to the 21st century.

=== FIDIC's PSM ===
The International Federation of Consulting Engineers (FIDIC) Project Sustainability Management Guidelines were created to assist project engineers and other stakeholders in setting sustainable development goals for their projects that are recognized and accepted as being in the interests of society. The process is also intended to align project goals with local conditions and priorities and assist those involved in managing projects to measure and verify their progress.

The Project Sustainability Management Guidelines are structured with Themes and Sub-Themes under the three main sustainability headings of Social, Environmental and Economic. For each individual Sub-Theme a core project indicator is defined along with guidance as to the relevance of that issue in the context of an individual project.

The Sustainability Reporting Framework provides guidance for organizations to use as the basis for disclosure about their sustainability performance, and also provides stakeholders a universally applicable, comparable framework in which to understand disclosed information.

The Reporting Framework contains the core product of the Sustainability Reporting Guidelines, as well as Protocols and Sector Supplements. The Guidelines are used as the basis for all reporting. They are the foundation upon which all other reporting guidance is based, and outline core content for reporting that is broadly relevant to all organizations regardless of size, sector, or location. The Guidelines contain principles and guidance as well as standard disclosures – including indicators – to outline a disclosure framework that organizations can voluntarily, flexibly, and incrementally adopt.

Protocols underpin each indicator in the Guidelines and include definitions for key terms in the indicator, compilation methodologies, intended scope of the indicator, and other technical references.

Sector Supplements respond to the limits of a one-size-fits-all approach. Sector Supplements complement the use of the core Guidelines by capturing the unique set of sustainability issues faced by different sectors such as mining, automotive, banking, public agencies and others.

=== IPD Environment Code ===
The IPD Environment Code was launched in February 2008. The Code is intended as a good practice global standard for measuring the environmental performance of corporate buildings. It aims to accurately measure and manage the environmental impacts of corporate buildings and enable property executives to generate high-quality, comparable performance information about their buildings anywhere in the world. The Code covers a wide range of building types (from offices to airports) and aims to inform and support the following;

- Creating an environmental strategy
- Inputting to real estate strategy
- Communicating a commitment to environmental improvement
- Creating performance targets
- Environmental improvement plans
- Performance assessment and measurement
- Life cycle assessments
- Acquisition and disposal of buildings
- Supplier management
- Information systems and data population
- Compliance with regulations
- Team and personal objectives

IPD estimates that it will take approximately three years to gather significant data to develop a robust set of baseline data that could be used across a typical corporate estate.

=== ISO 21931 ===
ISO/TS 21931:2006, Sustainability in building construction—Framework for methods of assessment for environmental performance of construction works—Part 1: Buildings, is intended to provide a general framework for improving the quality and comparability of methods for assessing the environmental performance of buildings. It identifies and describes issues to be taken into account when using methods for the assessment of environmental performance for new or existing building properties in the design, construction, operation, refurbishment and deconstruction stages. It is not an assessment system in itself but is intended to be used in conjunction with, and following the principles set out in, the ISO 14000 series of standards.

== Development history ==
- In the 1930s, geothermal hot water district heating of houses started in Iceland.
- In the 1960s, American architect Paul Soleri proposed a new concept of ecological architecture.
- In 1969, American architect Ian McHarg wrote the book "Design Integrates Nature", which marked the official birth of ecological architecture.
- In the 1970s, the energy crisis caused various building energy-saving technologies such as solar energy, geothermal energy, and wind energy to emerge, and energy-saving buildings became the forerunner of building development.
- In 1975, the Swiss PLENAR-group published the concept of an energy-efficient house in "PLENAR: Planning-Energy-Architecture".
- In 1980, the World Conservation Organization put forward the slogan "sustainable development" for the first time. At the same time, the energy-saving building system was gradually improved, and it was widely used in developed countries such as Germany, Britain, France and Canada.
- In 1982, Per and Maria Krusche et al. published an ecological approach to architecture in "Ökologisches Bauen" (ecological buildings) for the German Federal Environment Agency.
- In 1987, the United Nations Environment Program published the "Our Common Future" report, which established the idea of sustainable development.
- In 1990, the world's first green building standard was released in the UK.
- In 1992, because the "United Nations Conference on Environment and Development" promoted sustainable development, green buildings gradually became the direction of development.
- In 1993, the United States created the Green Building Association.
- In 1996, Hong Kong introduced green building standards.
- In 1999, Taiwan introduced green building standards.
- In 2000, Canada introduced green building standards.
- In 2005, Singapore initiated the "BCA Green Building Mark".
- In 2015, according to the Berkeley National Laboratory, China implemented the "Green Building Evaluation Standards".
- In 2021, the first, both low-cost and sustainable 3D printed house made out of a clay-mixture was completed.

== Green building by country ==
- Green building in Australia
- Green building in Bangladesh
- Green building in Germany
- Green building in France
- Green building in Israel
- Green building in South Africa
- Green building in the United Kingdom
- Green building in India
- Green building in the United States
- Green building in Canada
- The Model home 2020 project: Denmark, Austria, Germany, France, UK

== See also ==
- Alternative natural materials
- Arcology — high density ecological structures
- Autonomous building
- Biophilic design
- Building insulation
- Centre for Interactive Research on Sustainability
- Deconstruction (building)
- Eco hotel
- Environmental planning
- Geo-exchange
- Green architecture
- Green building and wood
- Green Building Council
- Green home
- Green technology
- Glass in green buildings
- Healthy building
- Leadership in Energy and Environmental Design
- List of low-energy building techniques
- Living Building Challenge
- Low-energy house
- National Green Building Standard
- Natural building
- Sustainable city
- Sustainable habitat
- Tropical green building
- World Green Building Council
- Yakhchāl
- Zero-energy building
- Zero heating building
