= Passive survivability =

Passive survivability refers to a building's ability to maintain critical life-support conditions in the event of extended loss of power, heating fuel, or water. This idea proposes that designers should incorporate ways for a building to continue sheltering inhabitants for an extended period of time during and after a disaster situation, whether it be a storm that causes a power outage, a drought which limits water supply, or any other possible event.

The term was coined by BuildingGreen President and EBN Executive editor Alex Wilson in 2005 after the wake of Hurricane Katrina. Passive survivability is suggested to become a standard in the design criteria for houses, apartment buildings, and especially buildings used as emergency shelters. While many of the strategies considered to achieve the goals of passive survivability are not new concepts and have been widely used in green building over the decades, the distinction comes from the motivation for moving towards resilient and safe buildings.

== Current issues ==
The increase in duration, frequency, and intensity of extreme weather events due to climate change exacerbates the challenges that passive survivability tries to address. Climates that did not previously need cooling are now seeing warmer temperatures and a need for air conditioning. Sea level rise and storm surge increases the risk of flooding in coastal locations, while precipitation-based flooding is an issue in low-lying areas. In order for buildings to provide livable conditions at all times, potential threats must be realized.

=== Power outages ===
In much of the developed world, there is a heavy reliance on a grid for power and gas. These grids are the main source of energy for many societies, and while they generally do not get interrupted, they are constantly prone to events that may cause disruption, such as natural disasters. In California, there have even been intentional power outages as a preventative measure in response to wildfires caused by power lines. When a power outage occurs, most mechanical heating and cooling can no longer operate. The aim of passive survivability is to be prepared for when such an event may occur, and maintain safe indoor temperatures. While back-up generators can provide some power during an outage, it is often not enough for heating and cooling needs or adequate lighting.

=== Extreme temperature ===
Heat is the leading cause of weather-related death in the US. Heat waves coinciding with power outages puts many lives at risk due to the inability of a building to keep temperatures down. Even without a power outage, lack of access to air conditioning or lack of funds to pay for electricity also highlights the need for passive ways to maintain a livable thermal environment. One of the issues that passive survivability looks at is considering the many ways to keep thermal resistance of a building skin to prevent a room from becoming overbearing in the event of having a lack of access to standard temperature regulating systems.

In the winter months, power outages or lack of a fuel source for heat pose a threat when there are cold fronts. Leaky construction and poor insulation result in rapid heat loss, causing indoor temperatures to fall.

=== Drought ===
During a drought, the limited water supply means a community must get by using less, which may mean mandatory restrictions on water use. Extended dry spells can instigate wildfires, which add a heightened level of devastation. Drying clay soil can cause critical water mains to burst and damage homes and infrastructure. Droughts can also cause power-outages in areas where thermo-electric power plants are the main source of electricity. Water-efficient appliances and landscaping is crucial in water-scarce locations.

=== Natural disasters ===
Natural disasters such as hurricanes, earthquakes, tornadoes, and other storm events can result in destruction of infrastructure that provides key electricity, water, and energy sources. Flooding after extreme precipitation is a major threat to buildings and utilities. The resulting electricity or water shortages can pose more of a threat than the event itself, often lasting longer than the initial disaster.

=== Terrorist threats ===
Terrorist threats and cyberterrorism can also cause an interruption in power supply. Attacks on central plants or major distribution segments, or hacking of a utility grid's control system are possible threats that could cut off electricity, water, or fuel.

== Passive design strategies ==
There are many passive strategies that require no electricity but instead can provide heating, cooling, and lighting for a building through proper design. In envelope-dominated buildings, the climate and surroundings have a greater effect on the interior of the structure due to a high surface area to volume ratio and minimal internal heat sources. Internally dominated buildings, such as the typical office building, are more affected by internal heat sources like equipment and people, however the building envelope still plays an important role, especially during a power outage.

While the distinction between the two types of buildings can sometimes be unclear, all buildings have a balance point temperature that is a result of building design and function. Balance point temperature is the outdoor temperature under which a building requires heating. An internally dominated structure will have a lower balance point temperature because of more internal heat sources, which means a longer overheated period and shorter under-heated period. Achieving a livable thermal environment during a power outage is dependent on the balance point temperature, as well as the interaction with the surrounding environment. A key aspect of all design for passive survivability is climate-responsive design. Passive strategies should be chosen based on climate and local conditions, in addition to building function.

=== Thermal envelope ===
When a building has leaky construction or poor insulation, desired heat is lost in the winter and conditioned air is lost in the summer. This loss is accounted for by pumping more mechanical heating or cooling into the building to make up the difference. Since this strategy is obsolete during a power outage, the building should be able to maintain internal temperatures for longer periods of time. To avoid heat loss by infiltration, the thermal envelope should be constructed with minimal breaks and joints, and cracks around windows and doors should be sealed. The air tightness of a building can be tested using a blower-door test.

Heat is also lost by transmission through the many surfaces in a room, including walls, windows, floors, ceilings, and doors. The area and thermal resistance of the surface, as well as the temperature difference between indoors and outdoors, determines the rate of heat loss. Continuous insulation with high R-values reduces heat loss by transmission in walls and ceilings. Double and triple-pane windows with special coatings reduce loss through windows. The practice of superinsulation greatly reduces heat loss through high levels of thermal resistance and air tightness.

=== Passive solar ===
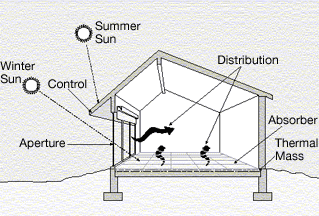
This building is designed to maintain its internal temperature by working with the sun, using the indicated features.

The ability to passively heat a building is beneficial during the colder winter months to help keep temperature levels up. Passive solar systems collect and distribute energy from the sun without the use of mechanical equipment such as fans or pumps. Passive solar heating consists of equator-facing glazing (south-facing in the northern hemisphere) to collect solar energy and thermal mass to store the heat. A direct-gain system allows short-wave radiation from the sun to enter a room through the window, where the floor and wall surfaces then act as thermal mass to absorb the heat, and the long-wave radiation is trapped inside due to the greenhouse effect. Proper glazing to thermal mass ratios should be used to prevent overheating and provide adequate heating. A Trombe wall or indirect gain system places the thermal mass right inside the glazing to collect heat during the day for night-time use due to time-lag of mass. This method is useful if daylighting is not required, or can be used in combination with direct-gain. A third technique is a sunspace or isolated gain system, which collects solar energy in a separate space attached to the building, and which can double as a living area for most of the year.

=== Heat avoidance ===
Heat avoidance strategies can be used to reduce cooling needs during the overheated periods of the year. This is achieved largely though shading devices and building orientation. In the northern hemisphere, windows should primarily be placed on southern facades which receive the most sun during the winter, while windows on east and west facades should be avoided due to difficulty to shade and high solar radiation during the summer. Fixed overhangs can be designed that block the sun during the overheated periods and allow the sun during the under-heated periods. Movable shading devices are most appropriate due to their ability to respond to the environment and building needs. Using light colors on roofs and walls is another effective strategy to reduce heat gain by reflecting the sun.

=== Natural ventilation ===
Natural ventilation can be used to increase thermal comfort during warmer periods. There are two main types of natural ventilation: comfort ventilation and night-flush cooling. Comfort ventilation brings in outside air to move over skin and increase the skin's evaporative cooling, creating a more comfortable thermal environment. The temperature does not necessarily decrease unless the outdoor temperature is lower than the indoor temperature, however the air movement increases comfort. This technique is especially useful in humid climates. When the wind is not blowing, a solar chimney can increase ventilation flow by using the sun to increase buoyancy of air.

Night-flush cooling utilizes the cool nighttime air to flush the warm air out of the building and lower the indoor temperature. The cooled structure then acts as a heat sink during the day, when bringing the warm outdoor air in is avoided. Night-flush cooling is most effective in locations that have large diurnal temperature ranges, such as in hot and dry climates. With both techniques, providing operable windows alone does not result in adequate natural ventilation; the building must be designed for proper airflow.

=== Daylighting ===
When the power goes out, rooms at the center of a building typically receive little to no light. Designing a building to take advantage of natural daylight instead of relying on electric lighting will make it more resilient to power outages and other events. Daylighting and passive solar gain often go hand in hand, but in the summer there is a desire for “cool” daylight. Daylighting design should therefore provide adequate lighting without adding undesired heat. Direct sunlight and reflected light from the sky have different levels of radiation. The daylighting design should reflect the needs of the building in both its climate and function, and different methods can achieve that. Southern and northern windows are generally best for daylighting, and clerestories or monitors on the roof can bring daylight into the center of a building. Placing windows higher up on a wall will bring the light further into the room, and other methods like light shelves can bring light deeper into a building by reflecting light off the ceiling.

== Other design strategies ==
The over arching goal of passive survivability is to try to reduce discomfort or suffering in the event of having a key source cut off to a building. There are several different solutions to any one design problem. While many of the solutions that are presented by advocates of passive survivability are ones that have been universally accepted by passive design and other standard sustainability practices, it is important to examine these measures and apply the appropriate strategies to developing and existing buildings in order to minimize the risk of displeasure or death.

=== Back-up Power ===
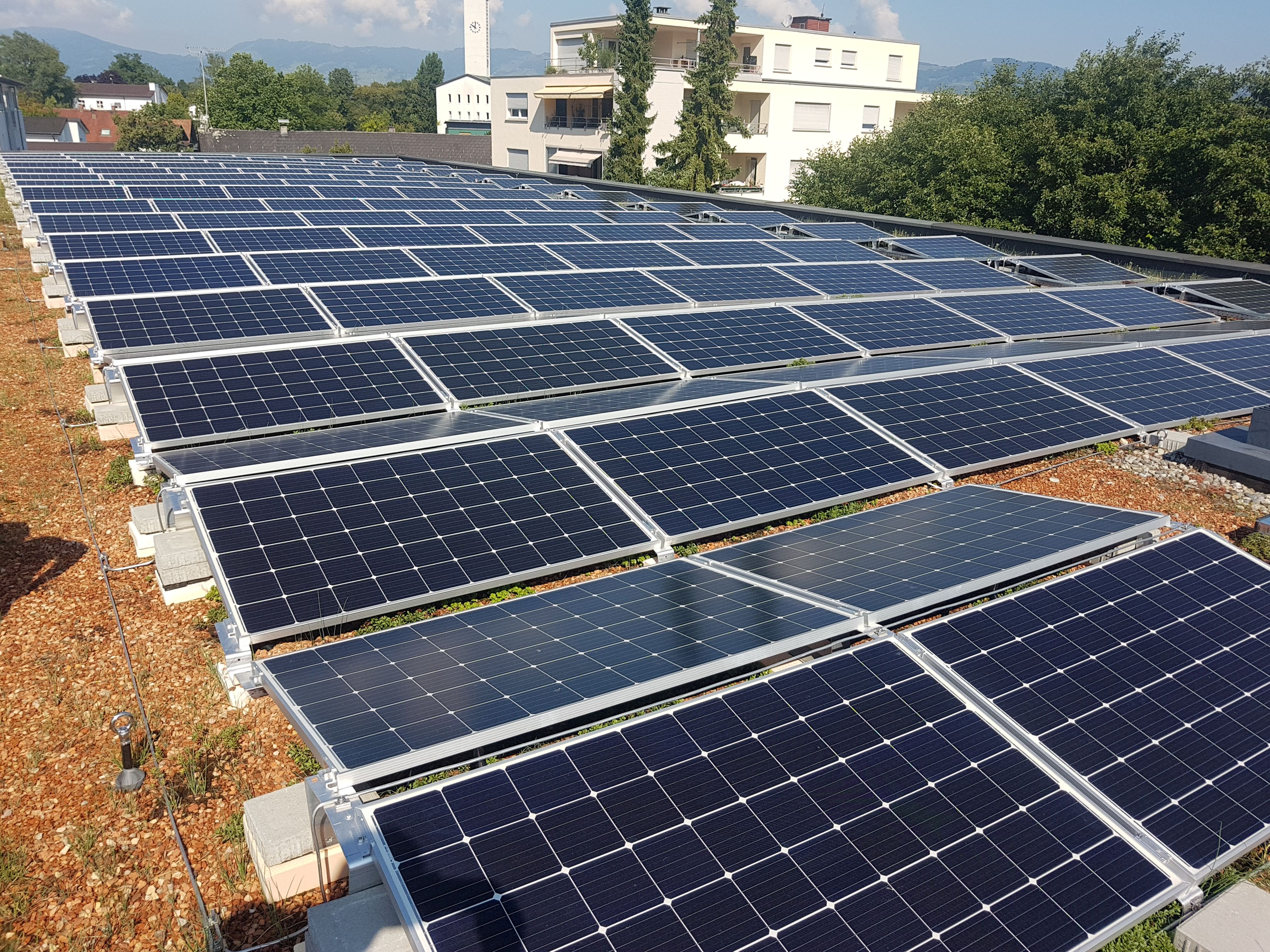
Photovoltaic solar panels on the roof of a building, providing on-site electrical power.

Buildings should be designed to maintain survivable thermal conditions without air conditioning or supplemental heat. Providing back-up generators and adequate fuel to maintain the critical functions of a building during outages are conventional solutions to power-supply interruptions. However, unless they are very large, generators support only basic needs for a short amount of time and may not power systems such as air conditioning, lighting, or even heating or ventilation during extended outages. Back-up generators are also expensive both to buy and maintain. Storing significant quantities of fuel on-site to power generators during extended outages has inherent environmental and safety risks, particularly during storms.

Renewable energy systems can provide power during an extreme event. For example, photovoltaic (or solar electric) power systems, when coupled with on-site battery storage can provide electricity when the grid loses power. Other fuel sources like wood can provide heat if buildings are equipped with wood-burning stoves or fireplaces.

=== Water ===
Emergency water supply systems such as rooftop rainwater harvesting systems can provide water for toilet flushing, bathing, and other building needs in the event of water supply interruptions. Rain barrels or larger cisterns store water from runoff that can often use a gravity-feed to obtain the water for use. Installing composting toilets and waterless urinals ensure those facilities can continue to function regardless of the circumstance, while reducing water consumptions on a daily basis. Having backup sources of potable water on-site is also a necessity in the case of water interruption.

== Passive survivability in rating systems ==
=== Leadership in Energy and Environmental Design ===
Leadership in Energy and Environmental Design (LEED) is a widely used green building certification in the United States. As of LEED version 4, there is a pilot credit called “Passive Survivability and Backup Power During Disruptions” under LEED BD+C: New Construction. The credit is worth up to two points, with one point awarded for providing for passive survivability and thermal safety, and one point awarded for providing backup power for critical loads. For the passive survivability point, the building must maintain thermally safe conditions during a four-day power outage during both peak summer and peak winter conditions. LEED lists three paths to compliance for thermal safety, two of which consist of thermal modelling, and the remaining path being Passive House certification.

=== Passive house certification ===
A passive house uses the indicated design features to achieve an extremely low energy consumption.

While passive survivability is not mentioned by name in the two major passive house standards, Passive House Institute and Passive House Institute US (PHIUS), the passive strategies that make these buildings so energy efficient are the same strategies outlined for passive survivability. Buildings that achieve passive house certification are hitting some of the main criteria for passive survivability, including airtight construction and superinsulation. Many buildings will also have on-site photovoltaics to offset energy consumption. These buildings that rely very little on energy will be more resilient in power outages and extreme weather.

=== RELi ===
RELi is a building and community rating system completely based on resilient design. It has been adopted by the US Green Building Council, the same body that developed LEED. The Hazard Adaptation and Mitigation category has several credits related to passive survivability. One required credit is “Fundamental Emergency Operations: Thermal Safety During Emergencies” which requires indoor temperatures to be at or below outdoor temperatures in the summer, and above 50 °F in the winter for up to four days. Another way to comply is to provide a thermal safe zone with adequate space for all building occupants. There is an optional poly-credit, “Advanced Emergency Operations: Back-Up Power, Operations, Thermal Safety & Operating Water,” that incorporates other passive survivability measures such as water storage. Another poly-credit, “Passive Thermal Safety, Thermal Comfort, & Lighting Design Strategies,” outlines more passive strategies including passive cooling, passive heating, and daylighting.
