= Passive solar building design =

Architectural engineering that uses the Sun's heat

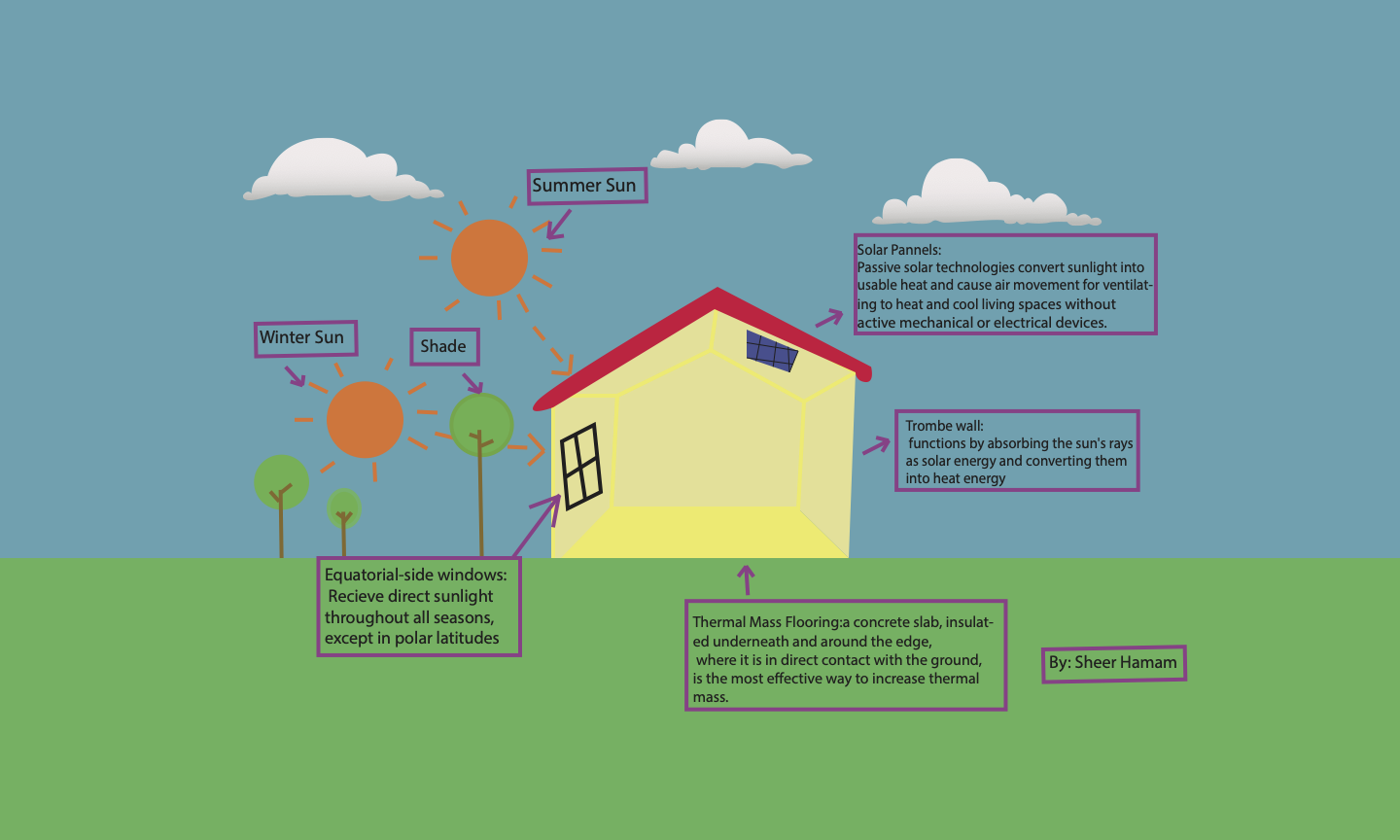
This image shows the characteristics of a Passive Solar home and its benefits.

In passive solar building design, windows, walls, and floors are made to collect, store, reflect, and distribute solar energy, in the form of heat in the winter and reject solar heat in the summer. This is called passive solar design because, unlike active solar heating systems, it does not involve the use of mechanical and electrical devices.

The key to designing a passive solar building is to best take advantage of the local climate performing an accurate site analysis. Elements to be considered include window placement and size, and glazing type, thermal insulation, thermal mass, and shading. Passive solar design techniques can be applied most easily to new buildings, but existing buildings can be adapted or "retrofitted".

== Passive energy gain ==
Passive solar technologies use sunlight without active mechanical systems (as contrasted to active solar, which uses thermal collectors). Such technologies convert sunlight into usable heat (in water, air, and thermal mass), cause air-movement for ventilating, or future use, with little use of other energy sources. A common example is a solarium on the equator-side of a building. Passive cooling is the use of similar design principles to reduce summer cooling requirements.

Some passive systems use a small amount of conventional energy to control dampers, shutters, night insulation, and other devices that enhance solar energy collection, storage, and use, and reduce undesirable heat transfer.

Passive solar technologies include direct and indirect solar gain for space heating, solar water heating systems based on the thermosiphon, use of thermal mass and phase-change materials for slowing indoor air temperature swings, solar cookers, the solar chimney for enhancing natural ventilation, and earth sheltering.

More widely, solar technologies include the solar furnace, but this typically requires some external energy for aligning their concentrating mirrors or receivers, and historically have not proven to be practical or cost effective for widespread use. 'Low-grade' energy needs, such as space and water heating, have proven over time to be better applications for passive use of solar energy.

== As a science ==
The scientific basis for passive solar building design has been developed from a combination of climatology, thermodynamics (particularly heat transfer: conduction (heat), convection, and electromagnetic radiation), fluid mechanics/natural convection (passive movement of air and water without the use of electricity, fans or pumps), and human thermal comfort based on heat index, psychrometrics and enthalpy control for buildings to be inhabited by humans or animals, sunrooms, solariums, and greenhouses for raising plants.

Specific attention is divided into: the site, location and solar orientation of the building, local sun path, the prevailing level of insolation (latitude/sunshine/clouds/precipitation), design and construction quality/materials, placement/size/type of windows and walls, and incorporation of solar-energy-storing thermal mass with heat capacity.

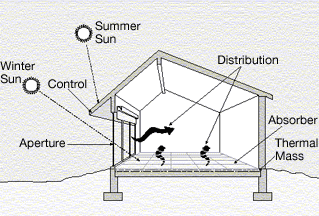
Elements of passive solar design, shown in a direct gain application

While these considerations may be directed toward any building, achieving an ideal optimized cost/performance solution requires careful, holistic, system integration engineering of these scientific principles. Modern refinements through computer modeling (such as the comprehensive U.S. Department of Energy "Energy Plus" building energy simulation software), and application of decades of lessons learned (since the 1970s energy crisis) can achieve significant energy savings and reduction of environmental damage, without sacrificing functionality or aesthetics. In fact, passive-solar design features such as a greenhouse/sunroom/solarium can greatly enhance the livability, daylight, views, and value of a home, at a low cost per unit of space.

Much has been learned about passive solar building design since the 1970s energy crisis. Many unscientific, intuition-based expensive construction experiments have attempted and failed to achieve zero energy – the total elimination of heating-and-cooling energy bills.

Passive solar building construction may not be difficult or expensive (using off-the-shelf existing materials and technology), but the scientific passive solar building design is a non-trivial engineering effort that requires significant study of previous counter-intuitive lessons learned, and time to enter, evaluate, and iteratively refine the simulation input and output.

One of the most useful post-construction evaluation tools has been the use of thermography using digital thermal imaging cameras for a formal quantitative scientific energy audit. Thermal imaging can be used to document areas of poor thermal performance such as the negative thermal impact of roof-angled glass or a skylight on a cold winter night or hot summer day.

The scientific lessons learned over the last three decades have been captured in comprehensive building energy simulation computer software systems (like U.S. DOE Energy Plus).

Scientific passive solar building design with quantitative cost benefit product optimization is not easy for a novice. The level of complexity has resulted in ongoing bad-architecture, and many intuition-based, unscientific construction experiments that disappoint their designers and waste a significant portion of their construction budget on inappropriate ideas.

The economic motivation for scientific design and engineering is significant. If it had been applied comprehensively to new building construction beginning in 1980 (based on 1970s lessons learned), The United States could be saving over $250,000,000 per year on expensive energy and related pollution today.

Since 1979, Passive Solar Building Design has been a critical element of achieving zero energy by educational institution experiments, and governments around the world, including the U.S. Department of Energy, and the energy research scientists that they have supported for decades. The cost effective proof of concept was established decades ago, but cultural change in architecture, the construction trades, and building-owner decision making has been very slow and difficult.

The new subjects such as architectural science and architectural technology are being added to some schools of architecture, with a future goal of teaching the above scientific and energy-engineering principles.

== The solar path in passive design ==
Solar altitude over a year; latitude based on New York, New York

The ability to achieve the goals for passive solar is fundamentally dependent on the seasonal variations in the sun's path throughout the day.

This occurs as a result of the inclination of the Earth's axis of rotation in relation to its orbit. The sun path is unique for any given latitude.

In the Northern Hemisphere non-tropical latitudes farther than 23.5 degrees from the equator:

- The sun will reach its highest point toward the south (in the direction of the equator)
- As winter solstice approaches, the angle at which the sun rises and sets progressively moves further toward the south and the daylight hours will become shorter
- The opposite is noted in summer where the sun will rise and set further toward the north and the daylight hours will lengthen

The converse is observed in the Southern Hemisphere, but the sun rises to the east and sets toward the west regardless of which hemisphere you are in.

In equatorial regions at less than 23.5 degrees, the position of the sun at solar noon will oscillate from north to south and back again during the year.

In regions closer than 23.5 degrees from either north-or-south pole, during summer the sun will trace a complete circle in the sky without setting whilst it will never appear above the horizon six months later, during the height of winter.

Seasonal insulation effects of a pergola

The 47-degree difference in the altitude of the sun at solar noon between winter and summer forms the basis of passive solar design. This information is combined with local climatic data (degree day) heating and cooling requirements to determine at what time of the year solar gain will be beneficial for thermal comfort, and when it should be blocked with shading. By strategic placement of items such as glazing and shading devices, the percentage of solar gain entering a building can be controlled throughout the year.

One passive solar sun path design problem is that although the sun is in the same relative position six weeks before, and six weeks after, the solstice, due to "thermal lag" from the thermal mass of the Earth, the temperature and solar gain requirements are quite different before and after the summer or winter solstice. Movable shutters, shades, shade screens, or window quilts can accommodate day-to-day and hour-to-hour solar gain and insulation requirements.

Careful arrangement of rooms completes the passive solar design. A common recommendation for residential dwellings is to place living areas facing solar noon and sleeping quarters on the opposite side. A heliodon is a traditional movable light device used by architects and designers to help model sun path effects. In modern times, 3D computer graphics can visually simulate this data, and calculate performance predictions.

== Passive solar heat transfer principles ==
Personal thermal comfort is a function of personal health factors (medical, psychological, sociological and situational), ambient air temperature, mean radiant temperature, air movement (wind chill, turbulence) and relative humidity (affecting human evaporative cooling). Heat transfer in buildings occurs through convection, conduction, and thermal radiation through roof, walls, floor and windows.

=== Convective heat transfer ===
Convective heat transfer can be beneficial or detrimental. Uncontrolled air infiltration from poor weatherization / weatherstripping / draft-proofing can contribute up to 40% of heat loss during winter; however, strategic placement of operable windows or vents can enhance convection, cross-ventilation, and summer cooling when the outside air is of a comfortable temperature and relative humidity. Filtered energy recovery ventilation systems may be useful to eliminate undesirable humidity, dust, pollen, and microorganisms in unfiltered ventilation air.

Natural convection causing rising warm air and falling cooler air can result in an uneven stratification of heat. This may cause uncomfortable variations in temperature in the upper and lower conditioned space, serve as a method of venting hot air, or be designed in as a natural-convection air-flow loop for passive solar heat distribution and temperature equalization. Natural human cooling by perspiration and evaporation may be facilitated through natural or forced convective air movement by fans, but ceiling fans can disturb the stratified insulating air layers at the top of a room, and accelerate heat transfer from a hot attic, or through nearby windows. In addition, high relative humidity inhibits evaporative cooling by humans.

=== Radiative heat transfer ===
The main source of heat transfer is radiant energy, and the primary source is the sun. Solar radiation occurs predominantly through the roof and windows (but also through walls). Thermal radiation moves from a warmer surface to a cooler one. Roofs receive the majority of the solar radiation delivered to a house. A cool roof, or green roof in addition to a radiant barrier can help prevent your attic from becoming hotter than the peak summer outdoor air temperature (see albedo, absorptivity, emissivity, and reflectivity).

Windows are a ready and predictable site for thermal radiation. Energy from radiation can move into a window in the day time, and out of the same window at night. Radiation uses photons to transmit electromagnetic waves through a vacuum, or translucent medium. Solar heat gain can be significant even on cold clear days. Solar heat gain through windows can be reduced by insulated glazing, shading, and orientation. Windows are particularly difficult to insulate compared to roof and walls. Convective heat transfer through and around window coverings also degrade its insulation properties. When shading windows, external shading is more effective at reducing heat gain than internal window coverings.

Western and eastern sun can provide warmth and lighting, but are vulnerable to overheating in summer if not shaded. In contrast, the low midday sun readily admits light and warmth during the winter, but can be easily shaded with appropriate length overhangs or angled louvres during summer and leaf bearing summer shade trees which shed their leaves in the fall. The amount of radiant heat received is related to the location latitude, altitude, cloud cover, and seasonal / hourly angle of incidence (see Sun path and Lambert's cosine law).

Another passive solar design principle is that thermal energy can be stored in certain building materials and released again when heat gain eases to stabilize diurnal (day/night) temperature variations. The complex interaction of thermodynamic principles can be counterintuitive for first-time designers. Precise computer modeling can help avoid costly construction experiments.

== Site specific considerations during design ==
- Latitude, sun path, and insolation (sunshine)
- Seasonal variations in solar gain e.g. cooling or heating degree days, solar insolation, humidity
- Diurnal variations in temperature
- Micro-climate details related to breezes, humidity, vegetation and land contour
- Obstructions / Over-shadowing – to solar gain or local cross-winds

== Design elements for residential buildings in temperate climates ==
- Placement of room-types, internal doors and walls, and equipment in the house.
- Orienting the building to face the equator (or a few degrees to the East to capture the morning sun)
- Extending the building dimension along the east–west axis
- Adequately sizing windows to face the midday sun in the winter, and be shaded in the summer.
- Minimising windows on other sides, especially western windows
- Erecting correctly sized, latitude-specific roof overhangs, or shading elements (shrubbery, trees, trellises, fences, shutters, etc.)
- Using the appropriate amount and type of insulation including radiant barriers and bulk insulation to minimise seasonal excessive heat gain or loss
- Using thermal mass to store excess solar energy during the winter day (which is then re-radiated during the night)

The precise amount of equator-facing glass and thermal mass should be based on careful consideration of latitude, altitude, climatic conditions, and heating/cooling degree day requirements.

Factors that can degrade thermal performance:

- Deviation from ideal orientation and north–south/east/west aspect ratio
- Excessive glass area ("over-glazing") resulting in overheating (also resulting in glare and fading of soft furnishings) and heat loss when ambient air temperatures fall
- Installing glazing where solar gain during the day and thermal losses during the night cannot be controlled easily e.g. West-facing, angled glazing, skylights
- Thermal losses through non-insulated or unprotected glazing
- Lack of adequate shading during seasonal periods of high solar gain (especially on the West wall)
- Incorrect application of thermal mass to modulate daily temperature variations
- Open staircases leading to unequal distribution of warm air between upper and lower floors as warm air rises
- High building surface area to volume, e.g., too many corners
- Inadequate weatherization leading to high air infiltration
- Lack of, or incorrectly installed, radiant barriers during the hot season. (See also cool roof and green roof)
- Insulation materials that are not matched to the main mode of heat transfer (e.g. undesirable convective/conductive/radiant heat transfer)

== Efficiency and economics of passive solar heating ==
Technically, PSH is highly efficient. Direct-gain systems can utilize (i.e. convert into "useful" heat) 65–70% of the energy of solar radiation that strikes the aperture or collector.

Passive solar fraction (PSF) is the percentage of the required heat load met by PSH and hence represents potential reduction in heating costs. RETScreen International has reported a PSF of 20–50%. Within the field of sustainability, energy conservation even of the order of 15% is considered substantial.

Other sources report the following PSFs:

- 5–25% for modest systems
- 40% for "highly optimized" systems
- Up to 75% for "very intense" systems

In favorable climates such as the southwest United States, highly optimized systems can exceed 75% PSF.

For more information see Solar Air Heat

== Key passive solar building configurations ==
There are three distinct passive solar energy configurations, and at least one noteworthy hybrid of these basic configurations:

- direct solar systems
- indirect solar systems
- hybrid direct/indirect solar systems
- isolated solar systems

=== Direct solar system ===
In a direct-gain passive solar system, the indoor space acts as a solar collector, heat absorber, and distribution system. South-facing glass in the northern hemisphere(north-facing in the southern hemisphere) admits solar energy into the building interior where it directly heats (radiant energy absorption) or indirectly heats (through convection) thermal mass in the building such as concrete or masonry floors and walls. The floors and walls acting as thermal mass are incorporated as functional parts of the building and temper the intensity of heating during the day. At night, the heated thermal mass radiates heat into the indoor space.

In cold climates, a sun-tempered building is the most basic type of direct gain passive solar configuration that simply involves increasing (slightly) the south-facing glazing area, without adding additional thermal mass. It is a type of direct-gain system in which the building envelope is well insulated, is elongated in an east–west direction, and has a large fraction (~80% or more) of the windows on the south side. It has little added thermal mass beyond what is already in the building (i.e., just framing, wall board, and so forth). In a sun-tempered building, the south-facing window area should be limited to about 5 to 7% of the total floor area, less in a sunny climate, to prevent overheating. Additional south-facing glazing can be included only if more thermal mass is added. Energy savings are modest with this system, and sun tempering is very low cost.

In genuine direct gain passive solar systems, sufficient thermal mass is required to prevent large temperature fluctuations in indoor air; more thermal mass is required than in a sun tempered building. Overheating of the building interior can result with insufficient or poorly designed thermal mass. About one-half to two-thirds of the interior surface area of the floors, walls and ceilings must be constructed of thermal storage materials. Thermal storage materials can be concrete, adobe, brick, and water. Thermal mass in floors and walls should be kept as bare as is functionally and aesthetically possible; thermal mass needs to be exposed to direct sunlight. Wall-to-wall carpeting, large throw rugs, expansive furniture, and large wall hangings should be avoided.

Typically, for about every 1 ft^{2} of south-facing glass, about 5 to 10 ft^{3} of thermal mass is required for thermal mass (1 m^{3} per 5 to 10 m^{2}). When accounting for minimal-to-average wall and floor coverings and furniture, this typically equates to about 5 to 10 ft^{2} per ft^{2} (5 to 10 m^{2} per m^{2}) of south-facing glass, depending upon whether the sunlight strikes the surface directly. The simplest rule of thumb is that thermal mass area should have an area of 5 to 10 times the surface area of the direct-gain collector (glass) area.

Solid thermal mass (e.g., concrete, masonry, stone, etc.) should be relatively thin, no more than about 4 in (100 mm) thick. Thermal masses with large exposed areas and those in direct sunlight for at least part of the day (2 hour minimum) perform best. Medium-to-dark, colors with high absorptivity, should be used on surfaces of thermal mass elements that will be in direct sunlight. Thermal mass that is not in contact with sunlight can be any color. Lightweight elements (e.g., drywall walls and ceilings) can be any color. Covering the glazing with tight-fitting, moveable insulation panels during dark, cloudy periods and nighttime hours will greatly enhance performance of a direct-gain system. Water contained within plastic or metal containment and placed in direct sunlight heats more rapidly and more evenly than solid mass due to natural convection heat transfer. The convection process also prevents surface temperatures from becoming too extreme as they sometimes do when dark colored solid mass surfaces receive direct sunlight.

Depending on climate and with adequate thermal mass, south-facing glass area in a direct gain system should be limited to about 10 to 20% of the floor area (e.g., 10 to 20 ft^{2} of glass for a 100 ft^{2} floor area). This should be based on the net glass or glazing area. Note that most windows have a net glass/glazing area that is 75 to 85% of the overall window unit area. Above this level, problems with overheating, glare and fading of fabrics are likely.

=== Indirect solar system ===
In an indirect-gain passive solar system, the thermal mass (concrete, masonry, or water) is located directly behind the south-facing glass and in front of the heated indoor space and so there is no direct heating. The position of the mass prevents sunlight from entering the indoor space and can also obstruct the view through the glass. There are two types of indirect gain systems: thermal storage wall systems and roof pond systems.

==== Thermal storage (Trombe) walls ====
In a thermal storage wall system, often called a Trombe wall, a massive wall is located directly behind south-facing glass, which absorbs solar energy and releases it selectively towards the building interior at night. The wall can be constructed of cast-in-place concrete, brick, adobe, stone, or solid (or filled) concrete masonry units. Sunlight enters through the glass and is immediately absorbed at the surface of the mass wall and either stored or conducted through the material mass to the inside space. The thermal mass cannot absorb solar energy as fast as it enters the space between the mass and the window area. Temperatures of the air in this space can easily exceed 120 °F (49 °C). This hot air can be introduced into interior spaces behind the wall by incorporating heat-distributing vents at the top of the wall. This wall system was first envisioned and patented in 1881 by its inventor, Edward Morse. Felix Trombe, for whom this system is sometimes named, was a French engineer who built several homes using this design in the French Pyrenees in the 1960s.

A thermal storage wall typically consists of a 4 to 16 in (100 to 400 mm) thick masonry wall coated with a dark, heat-absorbing finish (or a selective surface) and covered with a single or double layer of high transmissivity glass. The glass is typically placed from 3/4 in to 2 in from the wall to create a small airspace. In some designs, the mass is located 1 to 2 ft (0.6 m) away from the glass, but the space is still not usable. The surface of the thermal mass absorbs the solar radiation that strikes it and stores it for nighttime use. Unlike a direct gain system, the thermal storage wall system provides passive solar heating without excessive window area and glare in interior spaces. However, the ability to take advantage of views and daylighting are eliminated. The performance of Trombe walls is diminished if the wall interior is not open to the interior spaces. Furniture, bookshelves and wall cabinets installed on the interior surface of the wall will reduce its performance.

A classical Trombe wall, also generically called a vented thermal storage wall, has operable vents near the ceiling and floor levels of the mass wall that allow indoor air to flow through them by natural convection. As solar radiation heats the air trapped between the glass and wall and it begins to rise. Air is drawn into the lower vent, then into the space between the glass and wall to get heated by solar radiation, increasing its temperature and causing it to rise, and then exit through the top (ceiling) vent back into the indoor space. This allows the wall to directly introduce heated air into the space; usually at a temperature of about 90 °F (32 °C).

If vents are left open at night (or on cloudy days), a reversal of convective airflow will occur, wasting heat by dissipating it outdoors. Vents must be closed at night so radiant heat from the interior surface of the storage wall heats the indoor space. Generally, vents are also closed during summer months when heat gain is not needed. During the summer, an exterior exhaust vent installed at the top of the wall can be opened to vent to the outside. Such venting makes the system act as a solar chimney driving air through the building during the day.

Vented thermal storage walls vented to the interior have proven somewhat ineffective, mostly because they deliver too much heat during the day in mild weather and during summer months; they simply overheat and create comfort issues. Most solar experts recommended that thermal storage walls should not be vented to the interior.

There are many variations of the Trombe wall system. An unvented thermal storage wall (technically not a Trombe wall) captures solar energy on the exterior surface, heats up, and conducts heat to the interior surface, where it radiates from the interior wall surface to the indoor space later in the day. A water wall uses a type of thermal mass that consists of tanks or tubes of water used as thermal mass.

A typical unvented thermal storage wall consists of a south facing masonry or concrete wall with a dark, heat-absorbing material on the exterior surface and faced with a single or double layer of glass. High transmission glass maximizes solar gains to the mass wall. The glass is placed from 3/4 to 6 in. (20 to 150 mm) from the wall to create a small airspace. Glass framing is typically metal (e.g., aluminum) because vinyl will soften and wood will become super dried at the 180 °F (82 °C) temperature that can exist behind the glass in the wall. Heat from sunlight passing through the glass is absorbed by the dark surface, stored in the wall, and conducted slowly inward through the masonry. As an architectural detail, patterned glass can limit the exterior visibility of the wall without sacrificing solar transmissivity.

A water wall uses containers of water for thermal mass instead of a solid mass wall. Water walls are typically slightly more efficient than solid mass walls because they absorb heat more efficiently due to the development of convective currents in the liquid water as it is heated. These currents cause rapid mixing and quicker transfer of heat into the building than can be provided by the solid mass walls.

Temperature variations between the exterior and interior wall surfaces drive heat through the mass wall. Inside the building, however, daytime heat gain is delayed, only becoming available at the interior surface of the thermal mass during the evening when it is needed because the sun has set. The time lag is the time difference between when sunlight first strikes the wall and when the heat enters the building interior. Time lag is contingent upon the type of material used in the wall and the wall thickness; a greater thickness yields a greater time lag. The time lag characteristic of thermal mass, combined with dampening of temperature fluctuations, allows the use of varying daytime solar energy as a more uniform night-time heat source. Windows can be placed in the wall for natural lighting or aesthetic reasons, but this tends to lower the efficiency somewhat.

The thickness of a thermal storage wall should be approximately 10 to 14 in (250 to 350 mm) for brick, 12 to 18 in (300 to 450 mm) for concrete, 8 to 12 in (200 to 300 mm) for earth/adobe, and at least 6 in (150 mm) for water. These thicknesses delay movement of heat such that indoor surface temperatures peak during late evening hours. Heat will take about 8 to 10 hours to reach the interior of the building (heat travels through a concrete wall at rate of about one inch per hour). A good thermal connection between the inside wall finishes (e.g., drywall) and the thermal mass wall is necessary to maximize heat transfer to the interior space.

Although the position of a thermal storage wall minimizes daytime overheating of the indoor space, a well-insulated building should be limited to approximately 0.2 to 0.3 ft^{2} of thermal mass wall surface per ft^{2} of floor area being heated (0.2 to 0.3 m^{2} per m^{2} of floor area), depending upon climate. A water wall should have about 0.15 to 0.2 ft^{2} of water wall surface per ft^{2} (0.15 to 0.2 m^{2} per m^{2}) of floor area.

Thermal mass walls are best-suited to sunny winter climates that have high diurnal (day-night) temperature swings (e.g., southwest, mountain-west). They do not perform as well in cloudy or extremely cold climates or in climates where there is not a large diurnal temperature swing. Nighttime thermal losses through the thermal mass of the wall can still be significant in cloudy and cold climates; the wall loses stored heat in less than a day, and then leak heat, which dramatically raises backup heating requirements. Covering the glazing with tight-fitting, moveable insulation panels during lengthy cloudy periods and nighttime hours will enhance performance of a thermal storage system.

The main drawback of thermal storage walls is their heat loss to the outside. Double glass (glass or any of the plastics) is necessary for reducing heat loss in most climates. In mild climates, single glass is acceptable. A selective surface (high-absorbing/low-emitting surface) applied to the exterior surface of the thermal storage wall improves performance by reducing the amount of infrared energy radiated back through the glass; typically, it achieves a similar improvement in performance without the need for daily installation and removal of insulating panels. A selective surface consists of a sheet of metal foil glued to the outside surface of the wall. It absorbs almost all the radiation in the visible portion of the solar spectrum and emits very little in the infrared range. High absorbency turns the light into heat at the wall's surface, and low emittance prevents the heat from radiating back towards the glass.

==== Roof pond system ====
A roof pond passive solar system, sometimes called a solar roof, uses water stored on the roof to temper hot and cold internal temperatures, usually in desert environments. It typically is constructed of containers holding 6 to 12 in (150 to 300 mm) of water on a flat roof. Water is stored in large plastic bags or fiberglass containers to maximize radiant emissions and minimize evaporation. It can be left unglazed or can be covered by glazing. Solar radiation heats the water, which acts as a thermal storage medium. At night or during cloudy weather, the containers can be covered with insulating panels. The indoor space below the roof pond is heated by thermal energy emitted by the roof pond storage above. These systems require good drainage systems, movable insulation, and an enhanced structural system to support a 35 to 70 lb/ft^{2} (1.7 to 3.3 kN/m^{2}) dead load.

With the angles of incidence of sunlight during the day, roof ponds are only effective for heating at lower and mid-latitudes, in hot to temperate climates. Roof pond systems perform better for cooling in hot, low humidity climates. Not many solar roofs have been built, and there is limited information on the design, cost, performance, and construction details of thermal storage roofs.

=== Hybrid direct/indirect solar system ===
Kachadorian demonstrated that the drawbacks of thermal storage walls can be overcome by orienting the Trombe wall horizontally instead of vertically. If the thermal storage mass is constructed as a ventilated concrete slab floor instead of as a wall, it does not block sunlight from entering the home (the Trombe wall's most obvious disadvantage) but it can still be exposed to direct sunlight through double-glazed equator-facing windows, which can be further insulated by thermal shutters or shades at night. The Trombe wall's problematic delay in daytime heat capture is eliminated, because heat does not have to be driven through the wall to reach the interior air space: some of it reflects or re-radiates immediately from the floor. Provided the slab has air channels like the Trombe wall, which run through it in the north-south direction and are vented to the interior air space through the concrete slab floor just inside the north and south walls, vigorous air thermosiphoning through the slab still occurs as in the vertical Trombe wall, distributing the impounded heat throughout the house (and cooling the house in summer by the reverse process).

The ventilated horizontal slab is less expensive to construct than vertical Trombe walls, as it forms the foundation of the house which is a necessary expense in any building. Slab-on-grade foundations are a common, well-understood and cost-effective building component (modified only slightly by the inclusion of a layer of concrete-brick air channels), rather than an exotic Trombe wall construct. The only remaining drawback to this kind of thermal mass solar architecture is the absence of a basement, as in any slab-on grade design.

The Kachadorian floor design is a direct-gain passive solar system, but its thermal mass also acts as an indirect heating (or cooling) element, giving up its heat at night. It is an alternating cycle hybrid energy system, like a hybrid electric vehicle.

=== Isolated solar system ===
In an isolated gain passive solar system, the components (e.g., collector and thermal storage) are isolated from the indoor area of the building.

An attached sunspace, also sometimes called a solar room or solarium, is a type of isolated gain solar system with a glazed interior space or room that is part of or attached to a building but which can be completely closed off from the main occupied areas. It functions like an attached greenhouse that makes use of a combination of direct-gain and indirect-gain system characteristics. A sunspace may be called and appear like a greenhouse, but a greenhouse is designed to grow plants whereas a sunspace is designed to provide heat and aesthetics to a building. Sunspaces are very popular passive design elements because they expand the living areas of a building and offer a room to grow plants and other vegetation. In moderate and cold climates, however, supplemental space heating is required to keep plants from freezing during extremely cold weather.

An attached sunspace's south-facing glass collects solar energy as in a direct-gain system. The simplest sunspace design is to install vertical windows with no overhead glazing. Sunspaces may experience high heat gain and high heat loss through their abundance of glazing. Although horizontal and sloped glazing collects more heat in the winter, it is minimized to prevent overheating during summer months. Although overhead glazing can be aesthetically pleasing, an insulated roof provides better thermal performance. Skylights can be used to provide some daylighting potential. Vertical glazing can maximize gain in winter, when the angle of the sun is low, and yield less heat gain during the summer. Vertical glass is less expensive, easier to install and insulate, and not as prone to leaking, fogging, breaking, and other glass failures. A combination of vertical glazing and some sloped glazing is acceptable if summer shading is provided. A well-designed overhang may be all that is necessary to shade the glazing in the summer.

The temperature variations caused by the heat losses and gains can be moderated by thermal mass and low-emissivity windows. Thermal mass can include a masonry floor, a masonry wall bordering the house, or water containers. Distribution of heat to the building can be accomplished through ceiling and floor level vents, windows, doors, or fans. In a common design, thermal mass wall situated on the back of the sunspace adjacent to the living space will function like an indirect-gain thermal mass wall. Solar energy entering the sunspace is retained in the thermal mass. Solar heat is conveyed into the building by conduction through the shared mass wall in the rear of the sunspace and by vents (like an unvented thermal storage wall) or through openings in the wall that permit airflow from the sunspace to the indoor space by convection (like a vented thermal storage wall).

In cold climates, double glazing should be used to reduce conductive losses through the glass to the outside. Night-time heat loss, although significant during winter months, is not as essential in the sunspace as with direct gain systems since the sunspace can be closed off from the rest of the building. In temperate and cold climates, thermally isolating the sunspace from the building at night is important. Large glass panels, French doors, or sliding glass doors between the building and attached sunspace will maintain an open feeling without the heat loss associated with an open space.

A sunspace with a masonry thermal wall will need approximately 0.3 ft^{2} of thermal mass wall surface per ft^{2} of floor area being heated (0.3 m^{2} per m^{2} of floor area), depending on climate. Wall thicknesses should be similar to a thermal storage wall. If a water wall is used between the sunspace and living space, about 0.20 ft^{2} of thermal mass wall surface per ft^{2} of floor area being heated (0.2 m^{2} per m^{2} of floor area) is appropriate. In most climates, a ventilation system is required in summer months to prevent overheating. Generally, vast overhead (horizontal) and east- and west-facing glass areas should not be used in a sunspace without special precautions for summer overheating such as using heat-reflecting glass and providing summer-shading systems areas.

The internal surfaces of the thermal mass should be dark in color. Movable insulation (e.g., window coverings, shades, shutters) can be used help trap the warm air in the sunspace both after the sun has set and during cloudy weather. When closed during extremely hot days, window coverings can help keep the sunspace from overheating.

To maximize comfort and efficiency, the non-glass sunspace walls, ceiling and foundation should be well insulated. The perimeter of the foundation wall or slab should be insulated to the frost line or around the slab perimeter. In a temperate or cold climate, the east and west walls of the sunspace should be insulated (no glass).

== Additional measures ==
Measures should be taken to reduce heat loss at night e.g. window coverings or movable window insulation.

=== Heat storage ===
Diagram of a heat storage wall.

The sun doesn't shine all the time. Heat storage, or thermal mass, keeps the building warm when the sun can't heat it.

In diurnal solar houses, the storage is designed for one or a few days. The usual method is a custom-constructed thermal mass. This includes a Trombe wall, a ventilated concrete floor, a cistern, water wall or roof pond. It is also feasible to use the thermal mass of the earth itself, either as-is or by incorporation into the structure by banking or using rammed earth as a structural medium.

In subarctic areas, or areas that have long terms without solar gain (e.g. weeks of freezing fog), purpose-built thermal mass is very expensive. Don Stephens pioneered an experimental technique to use the ground as thermal mass large enough for annualized heat storage. His designs run an isolated thermosiphon 3 m under a house, and insulate the ground with a 6 m waterproof skirt.

=== Insulation ===
Thermal insulation or superinsulation (type, placement and amount) reduces unwanted leakage of heat. Some passive buildings are actually constructed of insulation.

=== Special glazing systems and window coverings ===
The effectiveness of direct solar gain systems is significantly enhanced by insulative (e.g. double glazing), spectrally selective glazing (low-e), or movable window insulation (window quilts, bifold interior insulation shutters, shades, etc.).

Generally, Equator-facing windows should not employ glazing coatings that inhibit solar gain.

There is extensive use of super-insulated windows in the German Passive House standard. Selection of different spectrally selective window coating depends on the ratio of heating versus cooling degree days for the design location.

=== Glazing selection ===
==== Equator-facing glass ====
The requirement for vertical equator-facing glass is different from the other three sides of a building. Reflective window coatings and multiple panes of glass can reduce useful solar gain. However, direct-gain systems are more dependent on double or triple glazing or even quadruple glazing in higher geographic latitudes to reduce heat loss. Indirect-gain and isolated-gain configurations may still be able to function effectively with only single-pane glazing. Nevertheless, the optimal cost-effective solution is both location and system dependent.

==== Roof-angle glass and skylights ====
Skylights admit harsh direct overhead sunlight and glare either horizontally (a flat roof) or pitched at the same angle as the roof slope. In some cases, horizontal skylights are used with reflectors to increase the intensity of solar radiation (and harsh glare), depending on the roof angle of incidence. When the winter sun is low on the horizon, most solar radiation reflects off of roof angled glass ( the angle of incidence is nearly parallel to roof-angled glass morning and afternoon ). When the summer sun is high, it is nearly perpendicular to roof-angled glass, which maximizes solar gain at the wrong time of year, and acts like a solar furnace. Skylights should be covered and well-insulated to reduce natural convection ( warm air rising ) heat loss on cold winter nights, and intense solar heat gain during hot spring/summer/fall days.

The equator-facing side of a building is south in the northern hemisphere, and north in the southern hemisphere. Skylights on roofs that face away from the equator provide mostly indirect illumination, except for summer days when the sun may rise on the non-equator side of the building (at some latitudes). Skylights on east-facing roofs provide maximum direct light and solar heat gain in the summer morning. West-facing skylights provide afternoon sunlight and heat gain during the hottest part of the day.

Some skylights have expensive glazing that partially reduces summer solar heat gain, while still allowing some visible light transmission. However, if visible light can pass through it, so can some radiant heat gain (they are both electromagnetic radiation waves).

You can partially reduce some of the unwanted roof-angled-glazing summer solar heat gain by installing a skylight in the shade of deciduous (leaf-shedding) trees, or by adding a movable insulated opaque window covering on the inside or outside of the skylight. This would eliminate the daylight benefit in the summer. If tree limbs hang over a roof, they will increase problems with leaves in rain gutters, possibly cause roof-damaging ice dams, shorten roof life, and provide an easier path for pests to enter your attic. Leaves and twigs on skylights are unappealing, difficult to clean, and can increase the glazing breakage risk in wind storms.

"Sawtooth roof glazing" with vertical-glass-only can bring some of the passive solar building design benefits into the core of a commercial or industrial building, without the need for any roof-angled glass or skylights.

Skylights provide daylight. The only view they provide is essentially straight up in most applications. Well-insulated light tubes can bring daylight into northern rooms, without using a skylight. A passive-solar greenhouse provides abundant daylight for the equator-side of the building.

Infrared thermography color thermal imaging cameras (used in formal energy audits) can quickly document the negative thermal impact of roof-angled glass or a skylight on a cold winter night or hot summer day.

The U.S. Department of Energy states: "vertical glazing is the overall best option for sunspaces." Roof-angled glass and sidewall glass are not recommended for passive solar sunspaces.

The U.S. DOE explains drawbacks to roof-angled glazing: Glass and plastic have little structural strength. When installed vertically, glass (or plastic) bears its own weight because only a small area (the top edge of the glazing) is subject to gravity. As the glass tilts off the vertical axis, however, an increased area (now the sloped cross-section) of the glazing has to bear the force of gravity. Glass is also brittle; it does not flex much before breaking. To counteract this, you usually must increase the thickness of the glazing or increase the number of structural supports to hold the glazing. Both increase overall cost, and the latter will reduce the amount of solar gain into the sunspace.

Another common problem with sloped glazing is its increased exposure to the weather. It is difficult to maintain a good seal on roof-angled glass in intense sunlight. Hail, sleet, snow, and wind may cause material failure. For occupant safety, regulatory agencies usually require sloped glass to be made of safety glass, laminated, or a combination thereof, which reduce solar gain potential. Most of the roof-angled glass on the Crowne Plaza Hotel Orlando Airport sunspace was destroyed in a single windstorm. Roof-angled glass increases construction cost, and can increase insurance premiums. Vertical glass is less susceptible to weather damage than roof-angled glass.

It is difficult to control solar heat gain in a sunspace with sloped glazing during the summer and even during the middle of a mild and sunny winter day. Skylights are the antithesis of zero energy building Passive Solar Cooling in climates with an air conditioning requirement.

==== Angle of incident radiation ====
The amount of solar gain transmitted through glass is also affected by the angle of the incident solar radiation. Sunlight striking a single sheet of glass within 45 degrees of perpendicular is mostly transmitted (less than 10% is reflected), whereas for sunlight striking at 70 degrees from perpendicular over 20% of light is reflected, and above 70 degrees this percentage reflected rises sharply.

All of these factors can be modeled more precisely with a photographic light meter and a heliodon or optical bench, which can quantify the ratio of reflectivity to transmissivity, based on angle of incidence.

Alternatively, passive solar computer software can determine the impact of sun path, and cooling-and-heating degree days on energy performance.

=== Operable shading and insulation devices ===
A design with too much equator-facing glass can result in excessive winter, spring, or fall day heating, uncomfortably bright living spaces at certain times of the year, and excessive heat transfer on winter nights and summer days.

Although the sun is at the same altitude 6-weeks before and after the solstice, the heating and cooling requirements before and after the solstice are significantly different. Heat storage on the Earth's surface causes "thermal lag." Variable cloud cover influences solar gain potential. This means that latitude-specific fixed window overhangs, while important, are not a complete seasonal solar gain control solution.

Control mechanisms (such as manual-or-motorized interior insulated drapes, shutters, exterior roll-down shade screens, or retractable awnings) can compensate for differences caused by thermal lag or cloud cover, and help control daily / hourly solar gain requirement variations.

Home automation systems that monitor temperature, sunlight, time of day, and room occupancy can precisely control motorized window-shading-and-insulation devices.

=== Exterior colors reflecting – absorbing ===
Materials and colors can be chosen to reflect or absorb solar thermal energy. Using information on a color for electromagnetic radiation to determine its thermal radiation properties of reflection or absorption can assist the choices.

In cold climates with short winter days direct-gain systems utilizing equator-facing windows may actually perform better when snow covers the ground, since reflected as well as direct sunlight will enter the house and be captured as heat.

== Landscaping and gardens ==
Energy-efficient landscaping materials for careful passive solar choices include hardscape building material and "softscape" plants. The use of landscape design principles for selection of trees, hedges, and trellis-pergola features with vines; all can be used to create summer shading. For winter solar gain it is desirable to use deciduous plants that drop their leaves in the autumn gives year round passive solar benefits. Non-deciduous evergreen shrubs and trees can be windbreaks, at variable heights and distances, to create protection and shelter from winter wind chill. Xeriscaping with 'mature size appropriate' native species of-and drought tolerant plants, drip irrigation, mulching, and organic gardening practices reduce or eliminate the need for energy-and-water-intensive irrigation, gas powered garden equipment, and reduces the landfill waste footprint. Solar powered landscape lighting and fountain pumps, and covered swimming pools and plunge pools with solar water heaters can reduce the impact of such amenities.

- Sustainable gardening
- Sustainable landscaping
- Sustainable landscape architecture

== Other passive solar principles ==
=== Passive solar lighting ===
Passive solar lighting techniques enhance taking advantage of natural illumination for interiors, and so reduce reliance on artificial lighting systems.

This can be achieved by careful building design, orientation, and placement of window sections to collect light. Other creative solutions involve the use of reflecting surfaces to admit daylight into the interior of a building. Window sections should be adequately sized, and to avoid over-illumination can be shielded with a Brise soleil, awnings, well placed trees, glass coatings, and other passive and active devices.

Another major issue for many window systems is that they can be potentially vulnerable sites of excessive thermal gain or heat loss. Whilst high mounted clerestory window and traditional skylights can introduce daylight in poorly oriented sections of a building, unwanted heat transfer may be hard to control. Thus, energy that is saved by reducing artificial lighting is often more than offset by the energy required for operating HVAC systems to maintain thermal comfort.

Various methods can be employed to address this including but not limited to window coverings, insulated glazing and novel materials such as aerogel semi-transparent insulation, optical fiber embedded in walls or roof, or hybrid solar lighting at Oak Ridge National Laboratory.

Reflecting elements, from active and passive daylighting collectors, such as light shelves, lighter wall and floor colors, mirrored wall sections, interior walls with upper glass panels, and clear or translucent glassed hinged doors and sliding glass doors take the captured light and passively reflect it further inside. The light can be from passive windows or skylights and solar light tubes or from active daylighting sources. In traditional Japanese architecture the Shōji sliding panel doors, with translucent Washi screens, are an original precedent. International style, Modernist and Mid-century modern architecture were earlier innovators of this passive penetration and reflection in industrial, commercial, and residential applications.

=== Passive solar water heating ===
There are many ways to use solar thermal energy to heat water for domestic use. Different active-and-passive solar hot water technologies have different location-specific economic cost benefit analysis implications.

Fundamental passive solar hot water heating involves no pumps or anything electrical. It is very cost effective in climates that do not have lengthy sub-freezing, or very-cloudy, weather conditions. Other active solar water heating technologies, etc. may be more appropriate for some locations.

It is possible to have active solar hot water which is also capable of being "off grid" and qualifies as sustainable. This is done by the use of a photovoltaic cell which uses energy from the sun to power the pumps.

== Comparison to the passive house standard in Europe ==
There is growing momentum in Europe for the approach espoused by the Passive House Institute (Passivhaus-Institut) in Germany. Rather than relying solely on traditional passive solar design techniques, this approach seeks to make use of all passive sources of heat, minimises energy usage, and emphasises the need for high levels of insulation reinforced by meticulous attention to detail in order to address thermal bridging and cold air infiltration. Most of the buildings built to the passive house standard also incorporate an active heat recovery ventilation unit with or without a small (typically 1 kW) incorporated heating component.

The energy design of Passive House buildings is developed using a spreadsheet-based modeling tool called the Passive House Planning Package (PHPP) which is updated periodically. The current version is PHPP 9.6 (2018). A building may be certified as a passive house when it can be shown that it meets certain criteria, the most important being that the annual specific heat demand for the house should not exceed 15kWh/m^{2}a.

== Comparison to the zero heating building ==
With advances in ultra low U-value glazing a passive house-based (nearly) zero heating building is proposed to supersede the nearly-zero energy buildings in EU. The zero heating building reduces on the passive solar design and makes the building more opened to conventional architectural design. The annual specific heat demand for the zero-heating house should not exceed 3 kWh/m^{2}a. Zero heating building is simpler to design and to operate. For example: there is no need for modulated sun shading in zero-heating houses.

== Design tools ==
Traditionally a heliodon was used to simulate the altitude and azimuth of the sun shining on a model building at any time of any day of the year. In modern times, computer programs can model this phenomenon and integrate local climate data (including site impacts such as overshadowing and physical obstructions) to predict the solar gain potential for a particular building design over the course of a year. GPS-based smartphone applications can now do this inexpensively on a hand held device. These design tools provide the passive solar designer the ability to evaluate local conditions, design elements and orientation prior to construction. Energy performance optimization normally requires an iterative-refinement design-and-evaluate process. There is no such thing as a "one-size-fits-all" universal passive solar building design that would work well in all locations.

== Levels of application ==
Many detached suburban houses can achieve reductions in heating expense without obvious changes to their appearance, comfort or usability. This is done using good siting and window positioning, small amounts of thermal mass, with good-but-conventional insulation, weatherization, and an occasional supplementary heat source, such as a central radiator connected to a (solar) water heater. Sunrays may fall on a wall during the daytime and raise the temperature of its thermal mass. This will then radiate heat into the building in the evening. External shading, or a radiant barrier plus air gap, may be used to reduce undesirable summer solar gain.

An extension of the "passive solar" approach to seasonal solar capture and storage of heat and cooling. These designs attempt to capture warm-season solar heat, and convey it to a seasonal thermal store for use months later during the cold season ("annualised passive solar.") Increased storage is achieved by employing large amounts of thermal mass or earth coupling. Anecdotal reports suggest they can be effective but no formal study has been conducted to demonstrate their superiority. The approach also can move cooling into the warm season. Examples:

- Passive annual heat storage (PAHS) – by John Hait
- Annualized geothermal solar (AGS) heating – by Don Stephen
- Earthed-roof

A "purely passive" solar-heated house would have no mechanical furnace unit, relying instead on energy captured from sunshine, only supplemented by "incidental" heat energy given off by lights, computers, and other task-specific appliances (such as those for cooking, entertainment, etc.), showering, people and pets. The use of natural convection air currents (rather than mechanical devices such as fans) to circulate air is related, though not strictly solar design. Passive solar building design sometimes uses limited electrical and mechanical controls to operate dampers, insulating shutters, shades, awnings, or reflectors. Some systems enlist small fans or solar-heated chimneys to improve convective air-flow. A reasonable way to analyse these systems is by measuring their coefficient of performance. A heat pump might use 1 J for every 4 J it delivers giving a COP of 4. A system that only uses a 30 W fan to more-evenly distribute 10 kW of solar heat through an entire house would have a COP of 300.

Passive solar building design is often a foundational element of a cost-effective zero energy building. Although a ZEB uses multiple passive solar building design concepts, a ZEB is usually not purely passive, having active mechanical renewable energy generation systems such as: wind turbine, photovoltaics, micro hydro, geothermal, and other emerging alternative energy sources. Passive solar is also a core building design strategy for passive survivability, along with other passive strategies.

=== Passive solar design on skyscrapers ===
There has been recent interest in the utilization of the large amounts of surface area on skyscrapers to improve their overall energy efficiency. Because skyscrapers are increasingly ubiquitous in urban environments, yet require large amounts of energy to operate, there is potential for large amounts of energy savings employing passive solar design techniques. One study, which analyzed the proposed 22 Bishopsgate tower in London, found that a 35% energy decrease in demand can theoretically be achieved through indirect solar gains, by rotating the building to achieve optimum ventilation and daylight penetration, usage of high thermal mass flooring material to decrease temperature fluctuation inside the building, and using double or triple glazed low emissivity window glass for direct solar gain. Indirect solar gain techniques included moderating wall heat flow by variations of wall thickness (from 20 to 30 cm), using window glazing on the outdoor space to prevent heat loss, dedicating 15–20% of floor area for thermal storage, and implementing a Trombe wall to absorb heat entering the space. Overhangs are used to block direct sunlight in the summer, and allow it in the winter, and heat reflecting blinds are inserted between the thermal wall and the glazing to limit heat build-up in the summer months.

Another study analyzed double-green skin facade (DGSF) on the outside of high-rise buildings in Hong Kong. Such a green facade, or vegetation covering the outer walls, can combat the usage of air conditioning greatly - as much as 80%, as discovered by the researchers.

In more temperate climates, strategies such as glazing, adjustment of window-to-wall ratio, sun shading and roof strategies can offer considerable energy savings, in the 30% to 60% range.

== See also ==
- Building-integrated photovoltaics
- Earthship
- Energy-plus building
- List of low-energy building techniques
- List of pioneering solar buildings
- Low-energy house
- Energy Rating systems
  - House Energy Rating
  - Home Energy Rating (USA)
  - EnerGuide (Canada)
  - National Home Energy Rating (UK)

== Bibliography ==
- Chiras, Daniel (2002). The Solar House. Chelsea Green Publishing.
- Doerr, Thomas (2012). Passive Solar Simplified (1st ed.).
- Kachadorian, James (2006). The Passive Solar House: Using Solar Design to Cool and Heat Your Home (2nd ed.). Chelsea Green Publishing. ISBN 9781603582407.
- Norton, Brian (2014). Harnessing Solar Heat. Springer. ISBN 978-94-007-7275-5.
- Shurcliff, William A. (1980). Thermal Shutters & Shades – Over 100 Schemes for Reducing Heat Loss through Windows 1980. Brick House Publishing Company. ISBN 978-0-931790-14-0.
- Wujek, Joseph (2010). Mechanical and Electrical Systems in Architecture, Engineering and Construction. Pearson Education/Prentice Hall. ISBN 9780135000045.
