= M&T =

M&T may refer to:

- Energy monitoring and targeting, an energy efficiency technique
- Markt+Technik, a book publisher
- M&T Bank, an American bank holding company
- Mortise and tenon, a woodworking technique
