= Driving factors =

In energy monitoring and targeting, a driving factor is something recurrent and measurable whose variation explains variation in energy consumption. The term independent variable is sometimes used as a synonym.

One of the most common driving factors is the weather, expressed usually as heating or cooling degree days. In energy-intensive processes, production throughputs would usually be used. For electrical circuits feeding outdoor lighting, the number of hours of darkness can be employed. For a borehole pump, the quantity of water delivered would be used; and so on. What these examples all have in common is that on a weekly basis (say) numerical values can be recorded for each factor and one would expect particular streams of energy consumption to correlate with them either singly or in a multivariate model.

Correlation is arguably more important than causality. Variation in the driving factor merely has to explain variation in consumption; it does not necessarily have to cause it, although that will in most scenarios be the case.

Driving factors differ from static factors, such as building floor areas, which determine energy consumption but change only rarely (if at all).
