= Barra system =

The Barra system is a passive solar building technology developed by Horazio Barra in Italy. It uses a collector wall to capture solar radiation in the form of heat. It also uses the thermosiphon effect to distribute the warmed air through channels incorporated into the reinforced concrete floors, warming the floors and hence the building. Alternatively, in hot weather, cool nighttime air can be drawn through the floors to chill them in a form of air conditioning.

Many successful systems were built in Europe, but Barra seems fairly unknown elsewhere.

== Passive solar collector ==
To convert the sun's light into heat indirectly, a separate insulated space is constructed on the sunny side of the house walls. Looking at the outside, and moving through a cross section there is an outside clear layer. This was traditionally built using glass, but with the advent of cheap, robust Polycarbonate glazing most designs use twin- or triple-wall polycarbonate greenhouse sheeting. Typically the glazing is designed to pass visible light, but block IR to reduce losses, and block UV to protect building materials.

The next layer is an absorption space. This absorbs most of the light entering the collector. It usually consists of an air gap of around 10 cm thickness with one or more absorption meshes suspended vertically in the space. Often window fly screen mesh is used, or horticultural shade cloth. The mesh itself can hold very little heat and warms up rapidly in light. The heat is absorbed by air passing around and through the mesh, and so the mesh is suspended with an air gap on both the front and back sides.

Finally a layer of insulation sits between the absorption space and the house. Usually this is normal house insulation, using materials such as polyisocyanurate foam, rock wool, foil and polystyrene.

This collector is very responsive - in the sun it heats up rapidly and the air inside starts to convect. If the collector were to be directly connected to the building using a hole near the floor and a hole near the ceiling an indirect solar gain system would be created. One problem with this that, like Trombe walls, the heat would radiate back out at night, and a convection current would chill the room during the night. Instead, the air movement can be stopped using automatic dampers, similar to those used for ventilating foundation spaces in cold climates, or plastic film dampers, which work by blocking air flow in one direction with a very lightweight flap of plastic. The addition of the damper makes the design an efficient isolated solar gain system.

== Thermal store ==
To store the thermal energy from the collector, the Barra system suspends a "spancrete" slab of concrete as a ceiling to store heat. This is fairly expensive and requires strong support. An alternative is to use water, which can store 5 times as much heat for a given weight. A simple, cheap and effective way is to store the water in sealed 100 mm diameter PVC storm pipe with end caps.

Whether water or concrete is used, the heat is transferred from the air in the collector into the storage material during the day, and released on demand using a ceiling fan into the room at night.

Where "spancrete" slabs are used, the ceiling also heats the house by radiation. Some houses are fitted with louvers (similar to those used on satellites) to adjust the radiation transfer. Warm air travels through the slab tunnels from south to north, where it exits and travels back south through the bulk of the room to the air heater inlet near the floor.

=== Intermediate thermal store ===
In most places a system designed for 5 successive days of no sun provides enough storage for all but a few days in a hundred years. Heat can be stored over a number of days using a large container of water. An 8-foot cube of water in the basement might store 15 kL of water, which is heated using a copper tube with fins in the collector. The performance of this can be further improved by putting the finned tube inside another layer of glazing at the back of the main collector, allowing the temperature to build up more than the surrounding air stream. On cloudy days the heat is transferred back out of the store to heat the house.
