= Heating degree day =

Sum of temperature values

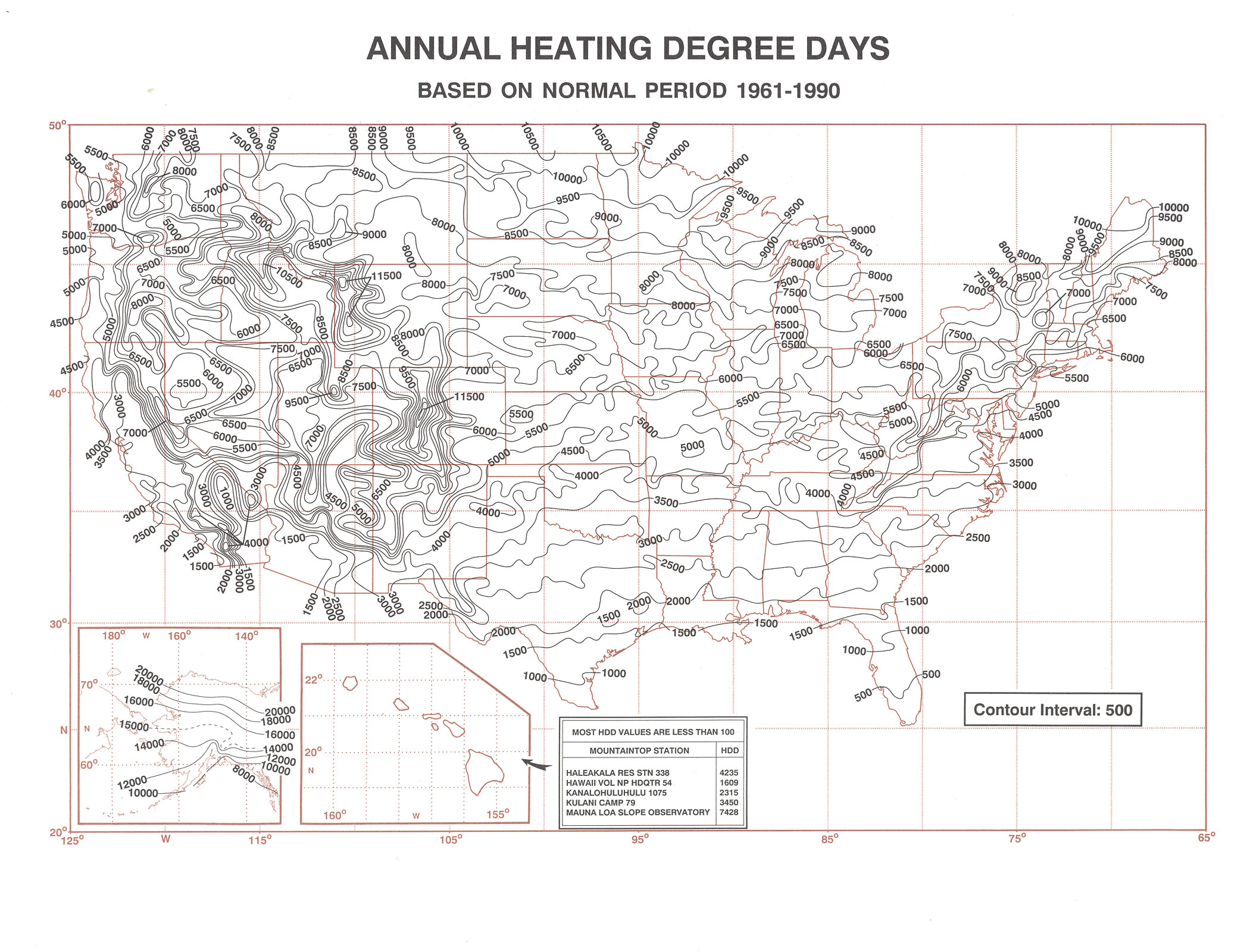
United States Heating Degree Day map, 1961–1990

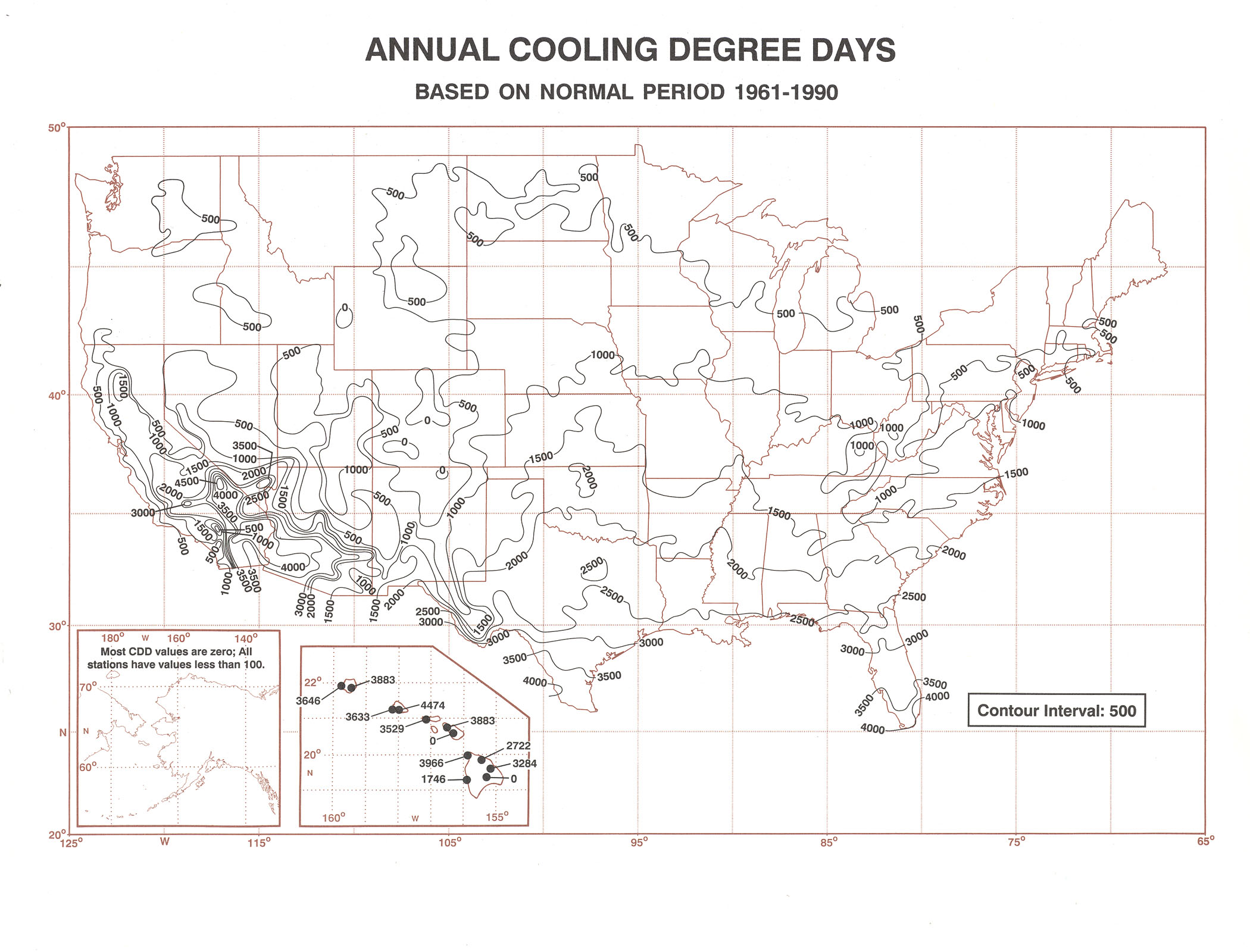
United States Cooling Degree Day map, 1961–1990

Heating degree day (HDD) is a measurement designed to quantify the demand for energy needed to heat a building. HDD is derived from measurements of outside air temperature. The estimated average heating energy requirements for a given building at a specific location are considered to be directly proportional to the number of HDD at that location.

Related measurements include the cooling degree day (CDD), which quantifies energy demand for air conditioning.

== Definition ==
Heating degree days are defined relative to a base temperature—the outside temperature above which a building needs no heating. Base temperatures may be defined for a particular building as a function of the temperature that the building is heated to, or they may be defined for a country or region, for example. In the latter case, building standards or conventions may exist for the temperature threshold. These include:

Country/Region	Base Temperature (°C)	Base Temperature (°F)
European Union	15.5	59.9
Denmark	17	62.6
Finland	17	62.6
Germany	15	59
Switzerland	12	53.6
United States	18.3	65

The base temperature does not necessarily correspond to the building's mean internal temperature, as standards may consider mean building insulation levels and internal gains to determine an average external temperature at which heating will be required. Base temperatures of 16 °C and 19 °C (61, 66 °F) are also used. The variation in choice of base temperature implies that HDD values cannot always be compared—care must be taken to ensure that only HDDs with equal base temperatures are compared.

There are a number of ways in which HDD can be calculated: the more detailed a record of temperature data, the more accurate the HDD that can be calculated. HDDs are often calculated using simple approximation methods that use daily temperature readings instead of more detailed temperature records such as half-hourly readings, the latter of which can be used to estimate an integral. One popular approximation method, that used by the U.S. National Weather Service, is to take the average temperature on any given day (the mean of the high and low temperature) and subtract it from the base temperature. If the value is less than or equal to zero, that day has zero HDD. But if the value is positive, that number represents the number of HDDs on that day. (For cooling degree days, the process works in reverse: the base temperature is subtracted from the average, and if this value is positive, that number represents the CDD.) This method works satisfactorily if the outside air temperature does not exceed the base temperature. In climates where this is likely to occur from time to time, there are refinements to the simple calculation which allow some 'credit' for the period of the day when the air is warm enough for heating to be unnecessary. This more accurate algorithm enables results to be computed in temperate climates (maritime as well as continental) throughout the year (not just during a defined heating season) and on a weekly as well as monthly basis.

HDD can be added over periods of time to provide a rough estimate of seasonal heating requirements. In the course of a heating season, for example, the number of HDD for New York City is 5,050, whereas that for Utqiagvik, Alaska is 19,990. Thus, one can say that, for a given home of similar structure and insulation, around four times the energy would be required to heat the home in Utqiagvik than in New York. Likewise, a similar home in Miami, Florida, whose heating degree days for the heating season is 500, would require around one tenth of the energy required to heat the house in New York City.

However, this is a theoretical approach, as the level of insulation of a building affects the demand for heating. For example, temperatures often drop below the base temperature during the night (daily low temperature in diurnal variation), but because of insulation, heating is unnecessary. In the end of spring and in the beginning of fall or in the winter depending on the climate, sufficient insulation keeps the indoor temperature higher than the outdoor temperature with little or no heating. For example, in Southern California, during winter, heating is not necessary in Los Angeles and San Diego if the insulation is sufficient to take into account the colder night temperatures. Also, buildings include thermal mass such as concrete, that is able to store energy of the sun absorbed in daytime. Thus, even if the heating degree days indicate a demand for heating, sufficient insulation of a building can make heating unnecessary.

== Example of use ==
HDD provides a simple metric for quantifying the amount of heating that buildings in a particular location need over a certain period (e.g. a particular month or year). In conjunction with the average U-value for a building, they provide a means of roughly estimating the amount of energy required to heat the building over that period.

One HDD means that the temperature conditions outside the building were equivalent to being below a defined threshold comfort temperature inside the building by one degree for one day. Thus, heat has to be provided inside the building to maintain thermal comfort.

Say we are given the number of heating degree days D in one year and we wish to calculate the energy required by a building. We know that heat needs to be provided at the rate at which it is being lost to the environment. This can be calculated as the sum of the heat losses per degree of each element of the buildings' thermal envelope (such as windows, walls, and roof) or as the average U-value of the building multiplied by the area of the thermal envelope of the building, or quoted directly for the whole building. This gives the buildings' specific heat loss rate P_{specific}, generally given in watts per kelvin (W/K). Total energy in kilowatt hours (kW⋅h) is then given by:

$Q = P_\text{specific} \times 24 \times \frac{D}{1000} \;$ [kW⋅h]

As total energy consumption is in kilowatt hours and heating degree days are [no. days × degrees], we must convert watts per kelvin into kilowatt hours per degree per day by dividing by 1000 (to convert watts to kilowatts) and multiplying by 24 hours in a day (1 kW = 1 kW⋅h/h). Since a 1 °C temperature change and a 1 K change in absolute temperature are the same, these cancel and no conversion is required.

Example: For a typical New York City winter day with a high of 40 °F and low of 30 °F, the average temperature is likely to be around 35 °F. For such a day we can approximate the HDD as (65 − 35) = 30. A month of thirty similar days might accumulate 900 HDD. A year (including summer average temperatures above 70 °F) might accumulate an annual 5000 HDD.

== Problems ==
Calculations using HDD have several problems. Heat requirements are not linear with temperature, and heavily insulated buildings have a lower "balance point". The amount of heating and cooling required depends on several factors besides outdoor temperature: how well insulated a particular building is, the amount of solar radiation reaching the interior of a house, the number of electrical appliances running (e.g. computers raise their surrounding temperature), the amount of wind outside, and what temperature the occupants find comfortable. Another important factor is the amount of relative humidity indoors; this is important in determining how comfortable an individual will be. Other variables such as precipitation, cloud cover, heat index, building albedo, and snow cover can also alter a building's thermal response.

Another problem with HDDs is that care needs to be taken if they are to be used to compare climates internationally, because of the different baseline temperatures used as standards in different countries and the use of the Fahrenheit scale in the US and the Celsius scale almost everywhere else. This is further compounded by the use of different approximation methods in different countries.

== Conversion ==
To convert °F HDD to °C HDD:

$$^{\circ}C\, \mathit{HDD} = \frac{5}{9} \times \, ^{\circ}F\, \mathit{HDD}$$

To convert °C HDD to °F HDD:

$$^{\circ}F\, \mathit{HDD} = \frac{9}{5} \times \, ^{\circ}C\, \mathit{HDD}$$

Note that, because HDD are relative to a base temperature (as opposed to being relative to zero), it is incorrect to add or subtract 32 when converting degree days from Celsius to Fahrenheit or vice versa.

== See also ==
- Degree day
- Heating, ventilation, and air conditioning
- Sol-air temperature
- Weather derivative
