= Balance point temperature =

For a building, the air temperature outdoors when the heat gained equals the heat lost

The building balance point temperature is the outdoor air temperature when the heat gains of the building are equal to the heat losses. Internal heat sources due to electric lighting, mechanical equipment, body heat, and solar radiation may offset the need for additional heating although the outdoor temperature may be below the thermostat set-point temperature.

The building balance point temperature is the base temperature necessary to calculate heating degree day to anticipate the annual energy demand to heat a building. The balance point temperature is a consequence of building design and function rather than outdoor weather conditions.

Internal and external heat gains and losses in a building.

== Mathematical definition ==
The balance point temperature is mathematically defined as:
Equation 1: t_{balance} = t_{thermostat} - (Q_{IHG} + Q_{SOL})/U_{bldg}
Where:

- t_{balance} is the balance point outdoor air temperature, given in °C (°F).
- t_{Thermostat} is the building thermostat set-point temperature, given in °C (°F).
- Q_{IHG} is the internal heat generation rate per unit floor area due to occupancy, electric lighting and mechanical equipment, given in W/m^{2} (Btu/s/ft^{2}). This internal heat generation is not constant due to variability in occupancy, lighting, and equipment operation schedule but is largely considered constant to a first order approximation.
- Q_{SOL} is the building heat gain per unit floor area due to solar radiation, given in W/m^{2} (Btu/s/ft^{2}). This heat gain is not constant due to solar variability with time of day and year but is largely considered constant to a first order approximation. In winter, it is reasonable to assume Q_{SOL}=0.
- U_{bldg} is the rate of heat transfer across the building envelope per degree temperature difference between outdoor and indoor temperature and per unit floor area, given in W/K/m^{2} (Btu/s/°F/ft^{2}). This heat transfer can vary due to variations of fresh air ventilation rate but is largely considered constant to a first order approximation.

This equation is simplified by assuming steady state heat transfer between the building and the environment and only provides an approximate building balance point temperature. The 2013 ASHRAE Handbook – Fundamentals, Chapter F18 provides more rigorous methodologies to calculate the heating loads in a nonresidential buildings. The ASHRAE heat balance method, for example, fully delineates the heat transfer through the inner and outer boundaries of the building wall by incorporating radiative (e.g. sun, indoor surfaces), convective (e.g. indoor and outdoor air), and conductive (e.g. inner to outer boundary) modes of heat transfer.

== Determination Methods ==
An example of determining a building's balance point temperature using the energy signature method.

In real-world scenarios, the balance point may be determined in one of two ways. In the energy signature method, a plot is created mapping energy consumption against mean outdoor temperature. The point on the chart at which weather-independent and weather-dependent electricity or gas demand intersect is the balance point temperature. This method only works if large quantities of data on the building energy use are available, preferably on a daily resolution.

In the performance line method multiple plots of energy consumption against heating degree days (HDD) and cooling degree days (CDD) are created, using a range of balance point temperatures to calculate the degree days. Best-fit second-order polynomials of the form y=ax^{2}+bx+c are then applied to the plots, which show various levels of curvature across the range of the data depending on the accuracy of the balance point temperature. In plots with overly high balance point temperatures the a variable is positive, resulting in an upward curve, while plots with low balance point temperatures curve downward due to a negative a variable. The plot in which a is closest to zero represents the most accurate balance point temperature. This method may be applied to buildings in which the availability of energy use data is less granular, perhaps only available on a weekly or monthly basis.

== Building characteristics ==
A building's thermal characteristics may be described as either internally load dominated or envelope load dominated, each having a characteristic balance point temperature.

Internally load dominated buildings have high internal heat gains from occupants, lighting and equipment. These buildings are usually compact with a low surface-area-to-volume ratio and many exterior walls in each room. The high internal heat gains allow the building to not be strongly affected by outdoor conditions. Large office spaces, schools and auditoriums are typical examples of internal load dominated buildings where the balance point temperature is around 10 °C (50 °F).

Envelope load dominated buildings have significant heat loss through the building envelope. These buildings have a high surface-area-to-volume ratio with few exterior walls in each room. Outdoor conditions strongly affect these buildings due to a lack of internal heat gains. Residences, small office buildings and schools are typical examples of skin load dominated buildings where the balance point temperature is set around 15 °C (59 °F).

Solar gains can hamper internal load dominated buildings, contributing to overheating, while helping skin dominated buildings that lose heat due to poor envelope performance. Therefore, architects and building designers must strategically control solar gains based on the building characteristics.

== Degree days ==
The concepts of degree days and balance point temperature are interconnected. By summing the differences between the balance point temperature and the outdoor temperature over a period of time, the resultant value is degree-time. Use of daily mean temperature data in the summation results in degree days, although degree hours or even degree minutes may be possible depending upon the granularity of the data used. The degree day is often further broken down into heating degree days (HDD), in which energy will need to be spent to heat the space, and cooling degree days (CDD), in which the space will need cooling (either through an input of energy or by natural means). This is achieved by counting any positive difference between the balance point temperature and the outdoor air temperature as HDD, and either discarding the remaining data or considering them to be CDD. Although degree days are calculated based on recorded energy use in the building, the balance point temperature of the building determines whether a building will annually have more HDD or CDD. A low balance point temperature (relative to the local climate) indicates that the building will be more likely to need additional cooling, while a high balance point temperature indicates that it is more likely to need heating. Ideally, a building should be designed such that the balance point temperature is as near as possible to the average outdoor temperature of the local climate, which will minimize both the CDD and HDD.

== Modeling ==
Balance point temperature is frequently used in modeling as a base by which to calculate the energy demand of buildings due to various stressors. This is achieved by calculating HDD or CDD based on the balance point, and extending these results to estimate energy use. A sensitivity analysis can also be conducted based on the effects of changing the balance point temperature, which may demonstrate the effect on a model of altering internal loads or envelope conditions of a building.
