= Thomas Doerr =

American architect

Thomas P. Doerr
- Born: July 23, 1964 (age 62); Hill AFB, Utah, U.S.
- Education: University of California at Berkeley
- Occupations: Architect & Educator
- Organization: Doerr Architecture
- Known for: Architectural design & green building Book "Passive Solar Simplified"
- Awards: Denver Mayor's Design Award; Historic Boulder Design Award
- Website: www.buildsustainably.com

Thomas Doerr (born July 23, 1964) is an architect, author, and educator. After studying design in Rome, Italy and interning in Boston, Massachusetts, Doerr received his Bachelor of Architecture Degree from the University of Texas at Austin in 1989. Doerr spent two years as an architectural intern in San Francisco, California then earned his master's degree at the University of California at Berkeley in 1993.

Doerr then worked in Germany designing mixed-use projects and multifamily housing before moving to Colorado. Since forming his firm Doerr Architecture in 2001, he has completed award-winning architecture projects including the passive solar Finch House, the off-the-grid Finstad+Cash House, and the zero-energy building, or net-zero energy, Moore House.

Doerr is a Green Points certified architect and past chair of the Colorado chapter of the AIA (American Institute of Architects) Committee on the Environment where he authored the Green Architecture Checklist for residences and edited the commercial checklist. He helped edit the Rocky Mountain edition of The Sustainable Design Resource Guide. Doerr is a licensed Energy Efficiency Inspector contractor and a founder of the Boulder County chapter of CRES (Colorado Renewable Energy Society). He is a professional advisor for the US Green Building Council (USGBC) Green Home Guide.

Doerr is a regular speaker on green building, has taught architecture at the University of Colorado at Boulder, and green building at Naropa University.

== Published work ==
His published material includes articles for professional magazines and:

- Book: Passive Solar Simplified: Easily design a truly green home for Colorado and the West, Alitheia Press 2012

- Video: Passive Solar Simplified
