= Energy monitoring and targeting =

Energy efficiency technique based on the standard management

Energy monitoring and targeting (M&T) is an energy efficiency technique based on the standard management axiom stating that “you cannot manage what you cannot measure”. M&T techniques provide energy managers with feedback on operating practices, results of energy management projects, and guidance on the level of energy use that is expected in a certain period. Importantly, they also give early warning of unexpected excess consumption caused by equipment malfunctions, operator error, unwanted user behaviours, lack of effective maintenance and the like.

The foundation of M&T lies in determining the normal relationships of energy consumptions to relevant driving factors (HVAC equipment, production though puts, weather, occupancy available daylight, etc.) and the goal is to help business managers:

- Identify and explain excessive energy use
- Detect instances when consumption is unexpectedly higher or lower than would usually have been the case
- Visualize energy consumption trends (daily, weekly, seasonal, operational...)
- Determine future energy use and costs when planning changes in the business
- Diagnose specific areas of wasted energy
- Observe how changes to relevant driving factors impact energy efficiency
- Develop performance targets for energy management programs
- Manage energy consumption, rather than accept it as a fixed cost

The ultimate goal is to reduce energy costs through improved energy efficiency and energy management control. Other benefits generally include increased resource efficiency, improved production budgeting and reduction of greenhouse gas (GHG) emissions.

== History ==
M&T is an established technique that was first launched as a national program in the UK in 1980, and has since then spread throughout Europe. These techniques are now also rapidly growing in America.

== Goals and benefits ==
Throughout the numerous M&T projects implemented since the 1980s, a certain number of benefits have proved to be recurrent:

- Energy cost savings: generally 5% of the original energy expenses, according to The Carbon Trust. Carbon Trust has conducted a study over 1000 small businesses and has concluded that on average an organization could save 5%.
- Reduction in GHG emissions: lower energy consumption helps reduce emissions
- Financing: measured energy reductions help obtain grants for energy efficiency projects
- Improved product and service costing: sub-metering allows the division of the energy bill between the different processes of an industry, and can be calculated as a production cost
- Improved budgeting: M&T techniques can help forecast energy expenses in the case of changes in the business, for example
- Waste avoidance: helps diagnose energy waste in any process.

== Technique ==
=== Key principles ===
Monitoring and Targeting techniques rely on three main principles, which form a constant feedback cycle, therefore improving control of energy use.

==== Monitoring ====
Monitoring information of energy use, in order to establish a basis for energy management and explain deviations from an established pattern. Its primary goal is to maintain said pattern, by providing all the necessary data on energy consumption, as well as certain driving factors, as identified during preliminary investigation (production, weather, etc.)

==== Reporting ====
The final principle is the one which enables ongoing control of energy use, achievement of targets and verification of savings: reports must be issued to the appropriate managers. This in turn allows decision-making and actions to be taken in order to achieve the targets, as well as confirmation or denial that the targets have been reached.

=== Procedures ===
Before the M&T measures themselves are implemented, a few preparatory steps are necessary. First of all, key energy consumers on the site must be identified. Generally, most of the energy consumption is concentrated in a small number of processes, like heating, or certain machinery. This normally requires a certain survey of the building and the equipment to estimate their energy consumption level.

It is also necessary to assess what other measurements will be required to analyze the consumption appropriately. This data will be used to chart against the energy consumption: these are underlying factors which influence the consumption, often production (for industry processes) or exterior temperature (for heating processes), but may include many other variables.

Once all variables to be measured have been established, and the necessary meters installed, it is possible to initiate the M&T procedures.

==== Measure ====
The first step is to compile the data from the different meters. Low-cost energy feedback displays have become available. The frequency at which the data is compiled varies according to the desired reporting interval, but can go once every 30 seconds to once every 15 minutes. Some measurements can be taken directly from the meters, others must be calculated. These different measurements are often called streams or channels.

Driving factors such as production or degree days also constitute streams and must be collected at intervals to match.

==== Define the base-line ====
The data compiled must then be plotted on a graph in order to define the general consumption base-line. Consumption rates are plotted in a scatter plot against production or any other variable previously identified, and the best fit line is identified. This graph is the image of the business’ average energy performance, and conveys a lot of information:

- The y-intercept gives the minimal consumption in the absence of the variable (no production, zero degree-day...). This is the base load of the system, the minimal consumption when it is not operating.
- The slope represents the relationship between the consumption and the previously identified variable. This represents the efficiency of the process.
- The scatter is the degree of variability of the consumption with operational factors.

The slope is not used quite as often for M&T purposes. However, a high y-intercept can mean that there is a fault in the process, causing it to use too much energy with no performance, unless there are specific distinctive features which lead to high base loads. Very scattered points, on the other hand, may reflect other significant factors playing in the variation of the energy consumption, other than the one plotted in the first place, but it can also be the illustration of a lack of control over the process.

==== Monitor variations ====
The next step is to monitor the difference between the expected consumption and the actual measured consumption. One of the tools most commonly used for this is the CUSUM, which is the CUmulative SUM of differences. This consists in first calculating the difference between the expected and actual performances (the best fit line previously identified and the points themselves).

The CUSUM can then be plotted against time on a new graph, which then yields more information for the energy efficiency specialist. Variances scattered around zero usually mean that the process is operating normally. Marked variations, increasing or decreasing steadily usually reflect a modification in the conditions of the process.

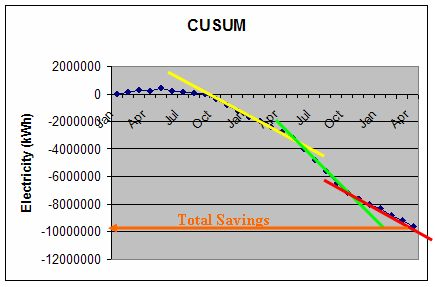
Example of a CUSUM graph

In the case of the CUSUM graph, the slope becomes very important, as it is the main indicator of the savings achieved. A slope going steadily down indicates steady savings. Any variation in the slope indicates a change in the process. For example, in the graph on the right, the first section indicated no savings. However, in September (beginning of the yellow line), an energy efficiency measure must have been implemented, as savings start to occur. The green line indicates an increase in the savings (as the slope is becoming steeper), whereas the red line must reflect a modification in the process having occurred in November, as savings have decreased slightly.

==== Identify causes ====
Energy efficiency specialists, in collaboration with building managers, will decipher the CUSUM graph and identify the causes leading to variations in the consumption. This can be a change in behaviour, a modification to the process, different exterior conditions, etc. These changes must be monitored and the causes identified in order to promote and enhance good behaviour, and discourage bad ones.

==== Set targets ====
Once the base line has been established, and causes for variations in energy consumption have been identified, it is time to set targets for the future. Now with all this information in hand, the targets are more realistic, as they are based on the building's actual consumption. Targeting consists in two main parts: the measure to which the consumption can be reduced, and the timeframe during which the compression will be achieved.

A good initial target is the best fit line identified during step 2. This line represents the average historical performance. Therefore, keeping all consumption below or equal to the historical average is an achievable target, yet remains a challenge as it involves eliminating high consumption peaks.

Some companies, as they improve their energy consumption, might even decide to bring their average performance down to their historical best. This is considered a much more challenging target.

==== Monitor results ====
This brings us back to step 1: measure consumption. One of the specificities of M&T is that it is an ongoing process, requiring constant feedback in order to consistently improve performance. Once the targets are set and the desired measures are implemented, repeating the procedure from the start ensures that the managers are aware of the success or failure of the measures, and can then decide on further action.

=== Examples ===
An example with some features of an M&T application is the ASU Campus Metabolism, which provides real-time and historic energy use and generation data for facilities of Arizona State University on a public web site. Many utilities also offer customers electric interval data monitoring services. Xcel Energy is an example of an investor owned utility that offers its customer electric and natural gas monitoring services under the product name InfoWise from Xcel Energy which is administered by Power TakeOff, a third party partner.

== See also ==
- Building automation
- Demand response
- Energy conservation
- Energy management software
- Home energy monitor
- Nonintrusive load monitoring
