= Trombe wall =

Passive solar building

Diagram of a Trombe wall.

Diagram of a heat storage wall.

A Trombe wall is a massive equator-facing wall that is painted a dark color in order to absorb thermal energy from incident sunlight and covered with a glass on the outside with an insulating air-gap between the wall and the glaze. A Trombe wall is a passive solar building design strategy that adopts the concept of indirect-gain, where sunlight first strikes a solar energy collection surface in contact with a thermal mass of air. The sunlight absorbed by the mass is converted to thermal energy (heat) and then transferred into the living space.

Trombe walls may also be referred to as a mass wall, solar wall, or thermal storage wall. However, due to the extensive work of professor and architect Félix Trombe in the design of passively heated and cooled solar structure, they are often called Trombe walls.

This system is similar to the air heater (as a simple glazed box on the south wall with a dark absorber, air space, and two sets of vents at top and bottom) created by professor Edward S. Morse a hundred years ago.

== History and development ==
In 1920s, the idea of solar heating began in Europe. In Germany, housing projects were designed to take advantage of the sun. The research and accumulated solar design experience was then spread across the Atlantic by architects such as Walter Gropius and Marcel Breuer. Apart from these early examples, heating homes with the sun made slow progress until the 1930s, when several different American architects started to explore the potential of solar heating. The pioneering work of these American architects, the influence of immigrant Europeans, and the memory of wartime fuel shortages made solar heating very popular during the initial housing boom at the end of World War II.

Later in the 1970s, before and after the international oil crisis of 1973, some European architectural periodicals were critical of standard construction methods and architecture of the time. They described how architects and engineers reacted to the crisis, proposing new techniques and projects in order to intervene innovatively in the built environment, using energy and natural resources more efficiently. Moreover, the depletion of natural resources generated interest in renewable energy sources, such as solar energy.

Parallel to global population growth, energy consumption and environmental issues have become a global concern - especially while the building sector is consuming the highest energy in the world and most of the energy is used for heating, ventilation and air conditioning systems.

For these reasons, today's buildings are expected to achieve both energy efficiency and environmental-friendly design through the use of renewable energy partly or completely instead of fossil energy for heating and cooling. In this direction, the integration of passive solar systems in buildings is one strategy for sustainable development and increasingly encouraged by international regulations.

Today's low-energy buildings with Trombe walls often improve on an ancient technique that incorporates a thermal storage and delivery system people have already used: thick walls of adobe or stone to trap the sun's heat during the day and release it slowly and evenly at night to heat their building. Today, the Trombe wall continues to serve as an effective strategy of passive solar design.

The first well-known example of a Trombe wall system was used in the Trombe house of Odeillo, France in 1967. The black painted wall is constructed of approximately 2 foot thick concrete with an air space and a double glazing on its exterior side. The house is primarily heated by radiation and convection from the inner surface of the concrete wall, and the results from studies show that 70% of this building's yearly heating needs are supplied by solar energy. This is comparably efficient to a good active solar heating system. The Trombe wall converts solar radiation into heat at about 70-80% efficiency—significantly more efficient than photovoltaic systems, which have an efficiency of around 15-20%.

Another passive collector-distributor Trombe Wall system was built in 1970, in Montmedy, France. The house with 280 cubic metres (9,900 cu ft) living space required 7000 kWh for space heating annually. At Montmedy-between 49° and 50° North latitude-5400 kWh were supplied by solar heating and the remainder from an auxiliary electrical system. The annual heating cost for electricity was approximately $225 when compared to an estimated $750 for a home entirely heated by electricity in the same area. This yields to a 77% reduction in heating load and a 70% reduction in the cost for winter heating requirements.

In 1974, the first example of Trombe wall system was used in the Kelbaugh House in Princeton, New Jersey. The house is located along the northern boundary of the site to maximize the unshaded access to available sunlight. The two-story building has 600 square feet (56 m^{2}) of thermal storage wall which is constructed of concrete and painted with a selective black paint over a masonry sealer. Although the main heating is accomplished by radiation and convection from the inner face of the wall, two vents in the wall also allow daytime heating by the natural convection loop. According to data collected in the winters of 1975-1976 and 1976–1977, the Trombe wall system reduced the heating costs respectively by 76% and 84%.

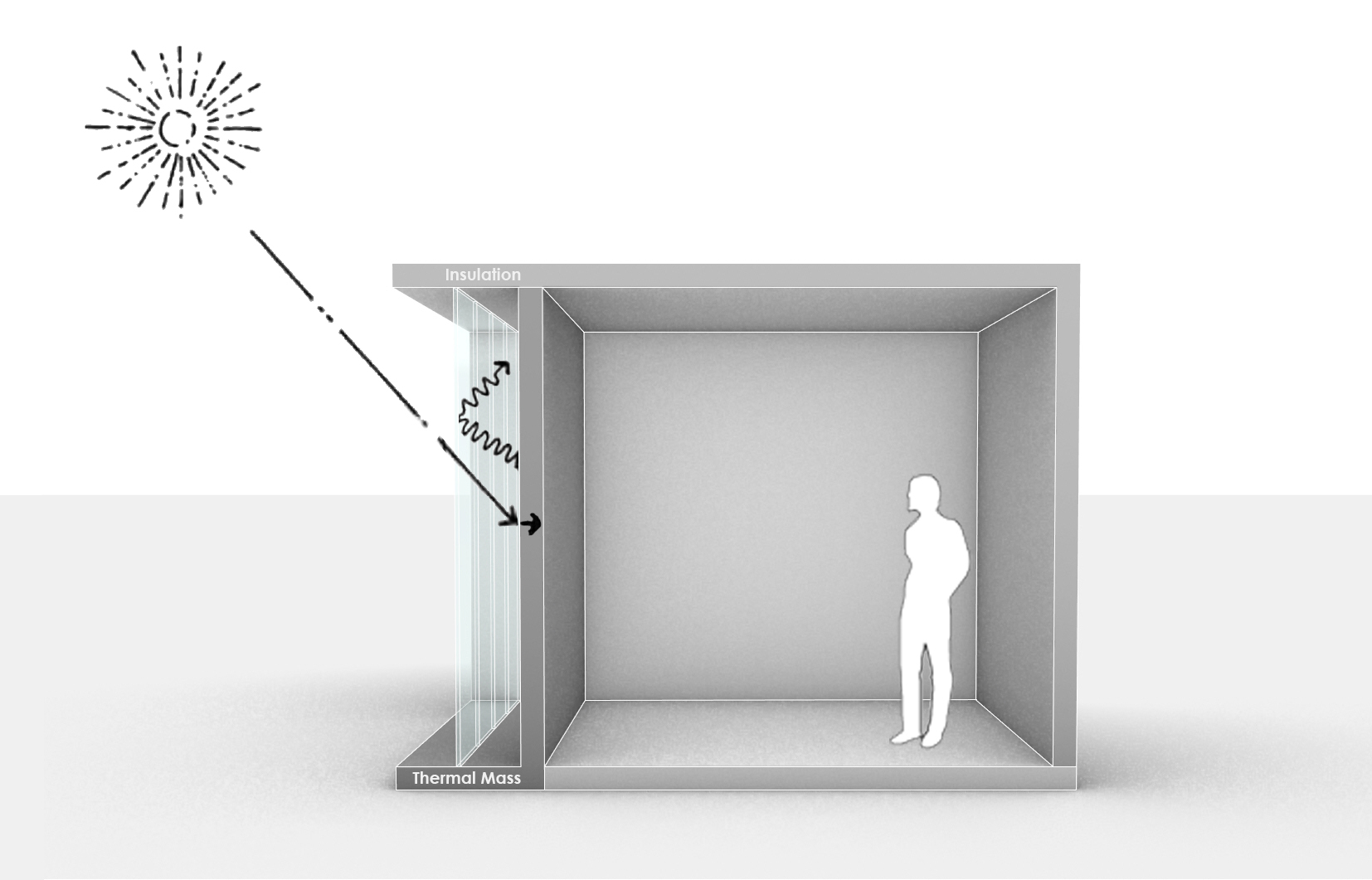
The Trombe wall collects heat during the day.

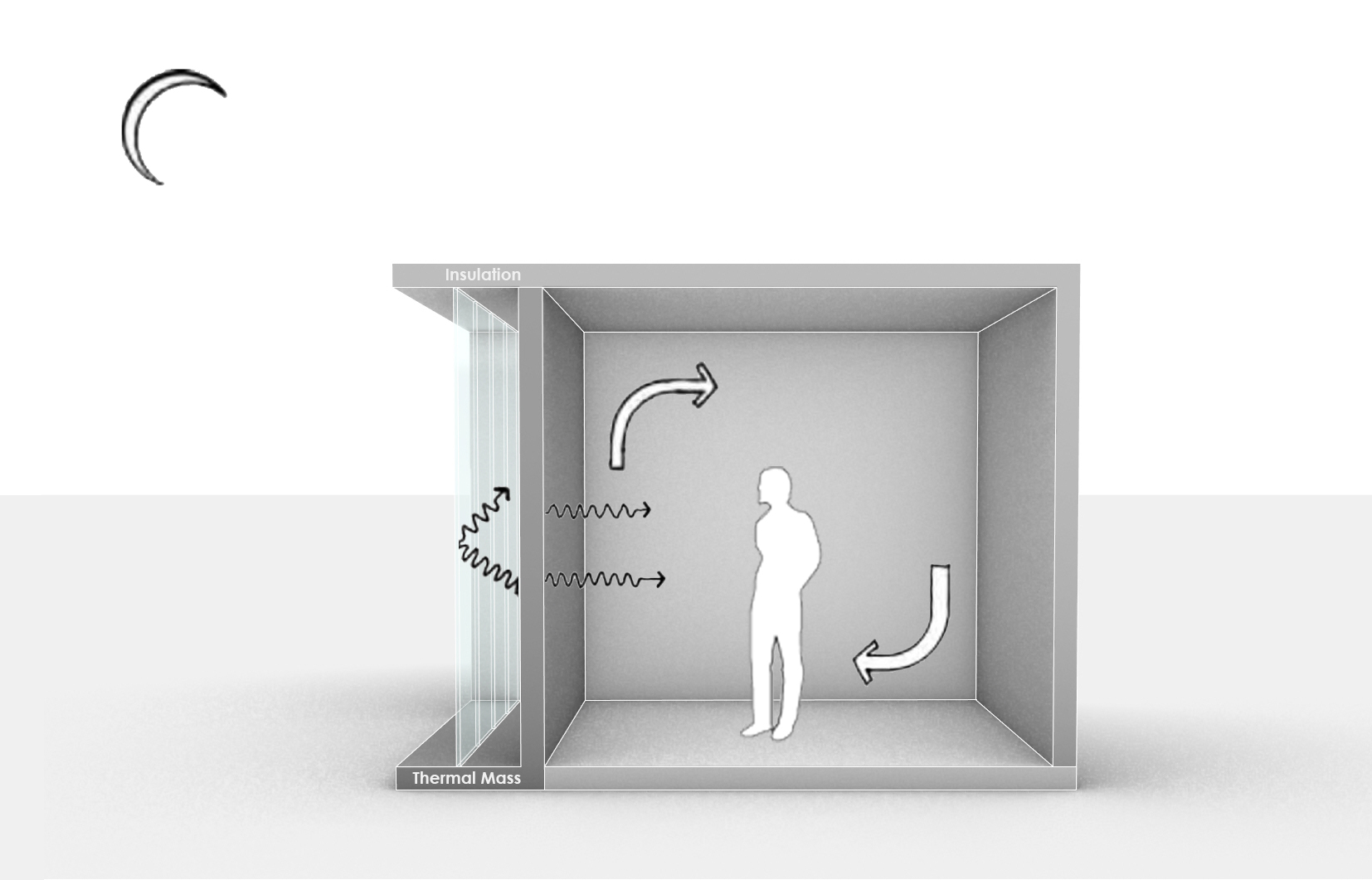
Due to wall's time lag caused by the wall material's heat capacity, most of the heat is released at night.

== Operation ==
Unlike an active solar system that employs hardware and mechanical equipment to collect or transport heat, a Trombe wall is a passive solar-heating system where the thermal energy flows in the system by natural means such as radiation, conduction, and natural convection. As a consequence, the wall works by absorbing sunlight on its outer face and then transferring this heat through the wall by conduction. Heat conducted through the wall is then distributed to the living space by radiation, and to some degree by convection, from the wall's inner surface.

The greenhouse effect helps this system by trapping the solar radiation between the glazing and the thermal mass. Heat from the sun, in the form of shorter-wavelength radiation, passes through the glazing largely unimpeded. When this radiation strikes the dark colored surface of the thermal mass facing the sun, the energy is absorbed and then re-emitted in the form of longer-wavelength radiation that cannot pass through the glazing as readily. Hence heat becomes trapped and builds up in the air space between the high heat capacity thermal mass and the glazing that faces the sun.

Another phenomenon that plays a role in the Trombe wall's operation is the time lag caused by the heat capacity of the materials. Since Trombe walls are quite thick and made of high heat capacity materials, the heat-flow from the warmer outer surface to the cooler inner surface is slower than other materials with less heat capacity. This delayed heat-flow phenomenon is known as time lag and it causes the heat gained during the day to reach the interior surface of the thermal mass later. This property of the mass helps to heat the living space in the evenings as well. So, if there is enough mass, the wall can act as a radiant heater all night long. On the other hand, if the mass is too thick, it takes too long to transmit the thermal energy it collects, thus, the living space does not receive enough heat during the evening hours when it is needed the most. Likewise, if the thermal mass is too thin, it transmits the heat too quickly, resulting in overheating of the living space during the day and little energy left for the evening. Also, Trombe walls using water as a thermal mass collect and distribute heat to a space in the same way, but they transfer the heat through the wall components (tubes, bottles, barrels, drums, etc.) by convection rather than by conduction and the convection performance of the water walls differs according to their different heat capacities. Larger storage volumes provide a greater and longer-term heat storage capacity, while smaller contained volumes provide greater heat exchange surfaces and thus faster distribution.

== Design and construction ==
Trombe walls are often designed to serve as a load-bearing function as well as to collect and store the sun's energy and to help enclose the building's interior spaces. The requirements of a Trombe Wall are glazing areas faced toward the equator for maximum winter solar gain and a thermal mass, located 4 inches or more directly behind the glass, which serves for heat storage and distribution. Also, there are many factors, such as color, thickness, or additional thermal control devices that have an impact on the design and the effectiveness of Trombe Walls. Equatorial, which is Southward in the Northern Hemisphere and Northward in the Southern Hemisphere, is the best rotation for passive solar strategies because they collect much more sun during the day than they lose during the night, and collect much more sun in the winter than in the summer.

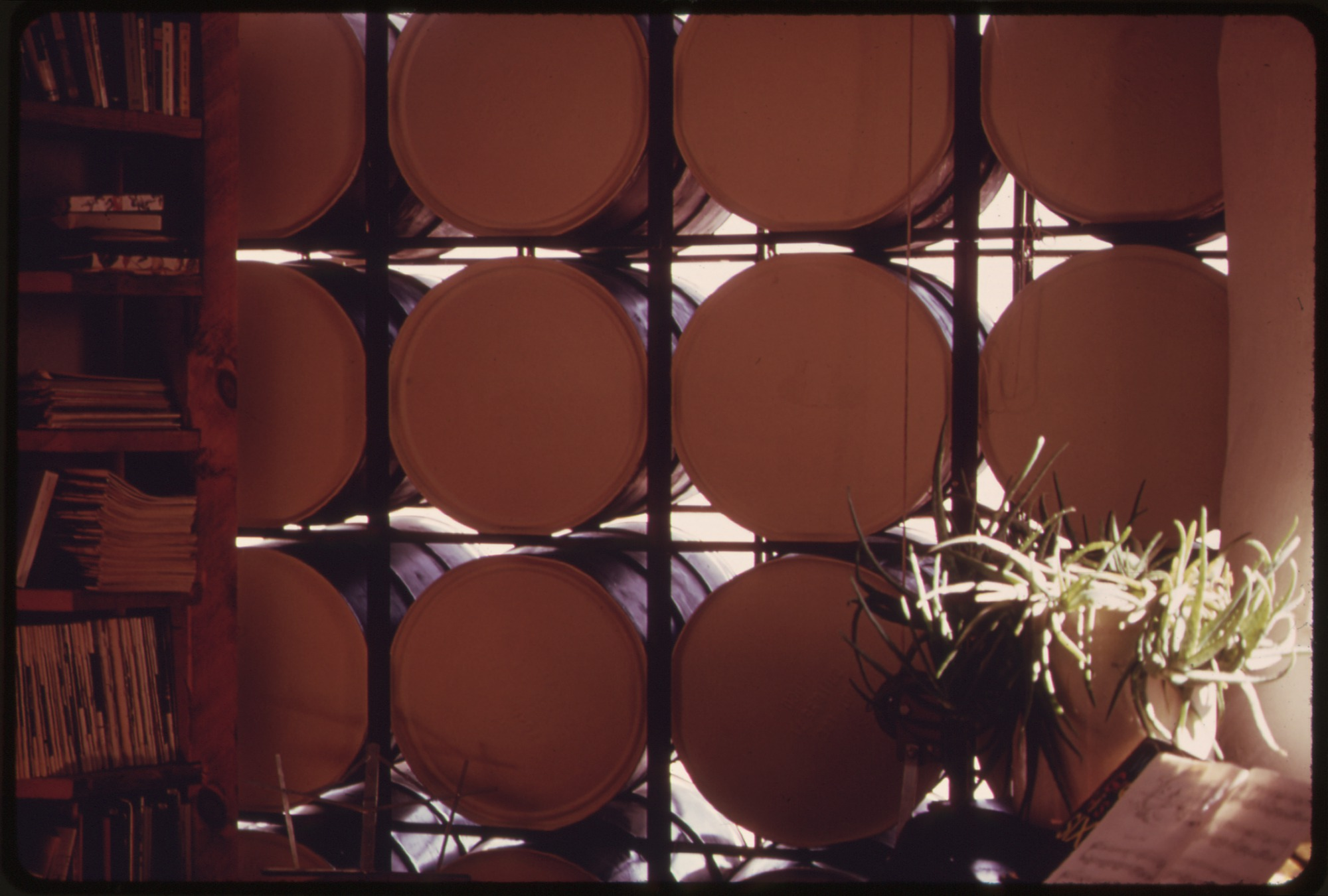
A water wall with 55-Gallon Water Filled Drums, Corrales, New Mexico, US.

The first design strategy to increase the effectiveness of Trombe Walls is painting the outside surface of the wall to black (or a dark color) for the best possible absorption of sunlight. Moreover, a selective coating to a Trombe wall improves its performance by reducing the amount of infrared energy radiated back through the glass. The selective surface consists of a sheet of metal foil glued to the outside surface of the wall and it absorbs almost all the radiation in the visible portion of the solar spectrum and emits very little in the infrared range. High absorbency turns the sunlight into heat at the wall's surface, and low emittance prevents the heat from radiating back towards the glass.

Although the Trombe walls are usually made of solid materials, such as concrete, brick, stone, or adobe, they can also be made of water. The advantage of using water as a thermal mass is that water stores considerably more heat per volume (has a greater heat capacity) than masonry. The developer of this water wall, Steve Baer, names this system “Drum Wall”. He painted the steel containers similar to oil drums and filled them almost full of water, leaving some room for the thermal expansion. Then stacked the containers horizontally behind an equator-facing double glazing with the blackened bottoms facing outside. This water wall involves the same principles as the Trombe walls but employs a different storage material and different methods of containing that material. Like the dark colored thermal mass of the Trombe walls, the containers that store the water are also frequently painted with dark colors to increase their absorptivity, but it is also common to leave them transparent or translucent to allow some daylight to pass through.

Another critical part of Trombe wall design is choosing the proper thermal mass material and thickness. The optimum thickness of the thermal mass is dependent on the heat capacity and the thermal conductivity of the material used. There are some rules to follow while sizing the thermal mass.

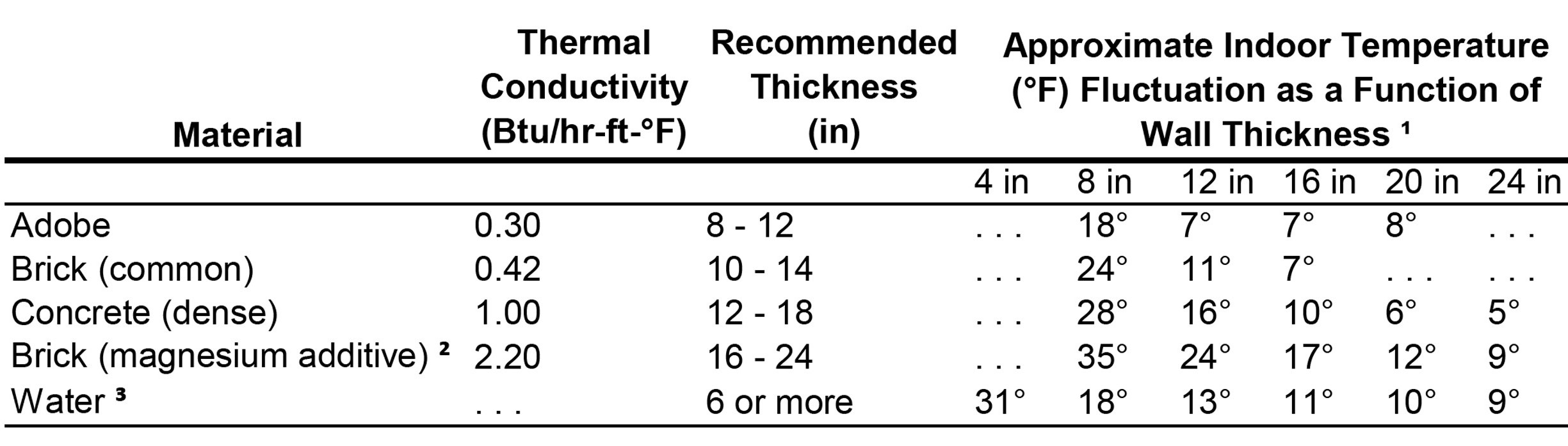
Effect of Wall the Thermal Mass Thickness on Living Space Air Temperature Fluctuations. Mazria, E.

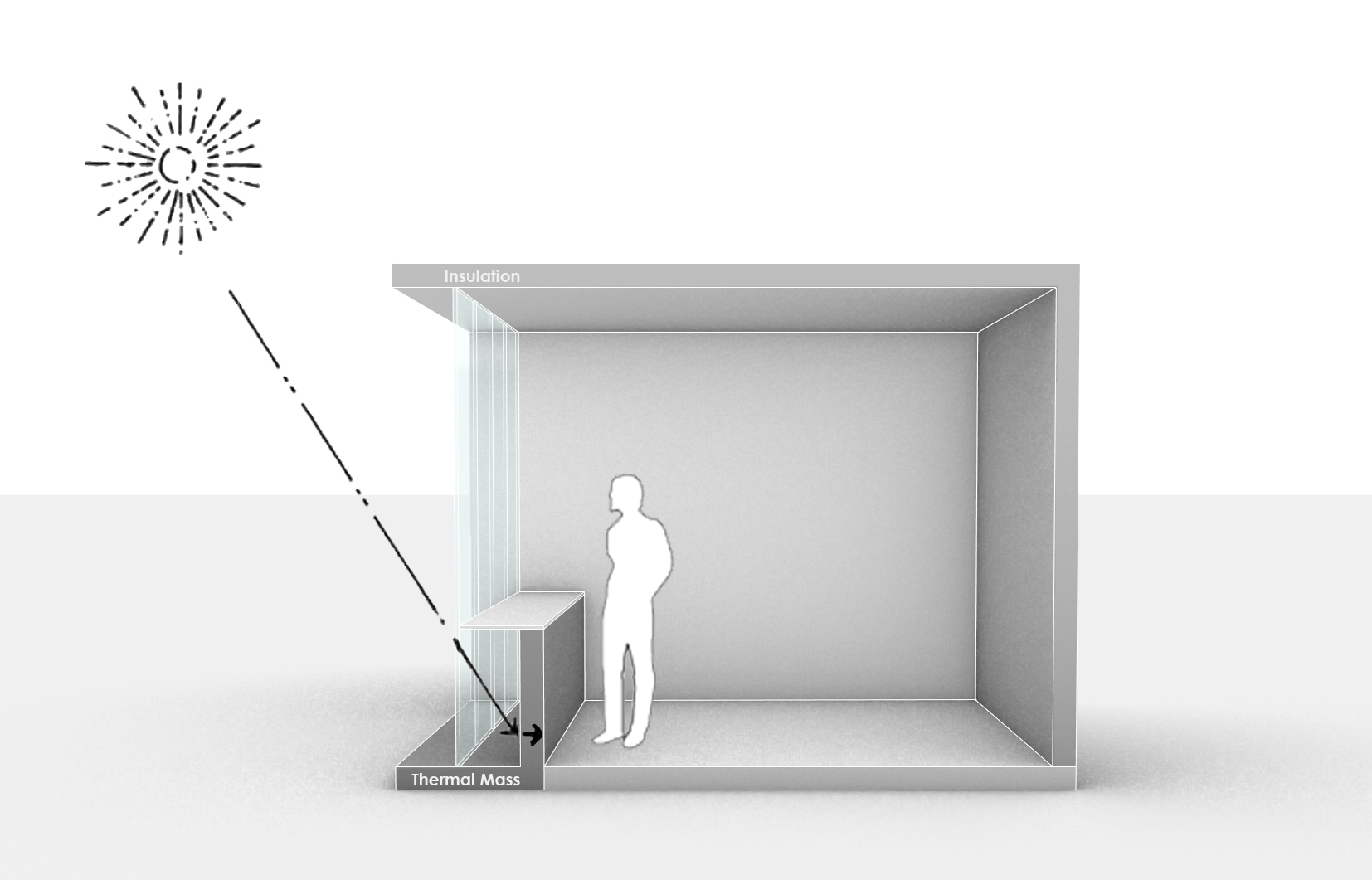
A half-height wall allows controlled direct gain for daytime heating and daylighting while also storing heat for the night.

The optimum thickness of a masonry wall increases as the thermal conductivity of the wall material increases. For instance, to compensate for a rapid heat transfer through a highly conductive material, the wall needs to be thicker.

Accordingly, since the thicker wall absorbs and stores more heat to use at night, the efficiency of the wall increases as the conductivity and thickness of the wall increase.

There is an optimum thickness range for the masonry materials.

The efficiency of the water wall increases as the thickness of the wall increases. However, it is hard to notice a considerable performance increase as the walls get thicker than 6 inches. Likely, a water wall thinner than 6 inches is also not enough to act as a proper thermal mass that stores the heat during the day.

In the early Trombe wall design, there are vents on the walls to distribute the heat by natural convection (thermocirculation) from the exterior face of the wall, but only during the daytime and early evening. Solar radiation passing through the glass is absorbed by the wall heating its surface to temperature as high as 150 °F (66 °C). This heat is transferred to the air in the air space between the wall and the glass. Through openings or vents located at the top of the wall, warm air rising in the air space enters the room while simultaneously drawing cool room air through the low vents in the wall. In this way additional heat can be supplied to the living space during periods of sunny weather. However, it is now clear that the vents do not work well in either summer or winter. It becomes more common to design a half Trombe Wall then combine it with a direct gain system. The direct gain part delivers heat early in the day while the Trombe wall stores heat for the nighttime use. Moreover, unlike a full Trombe wall, the direct gain part allows views and the delight of winter sunshine.

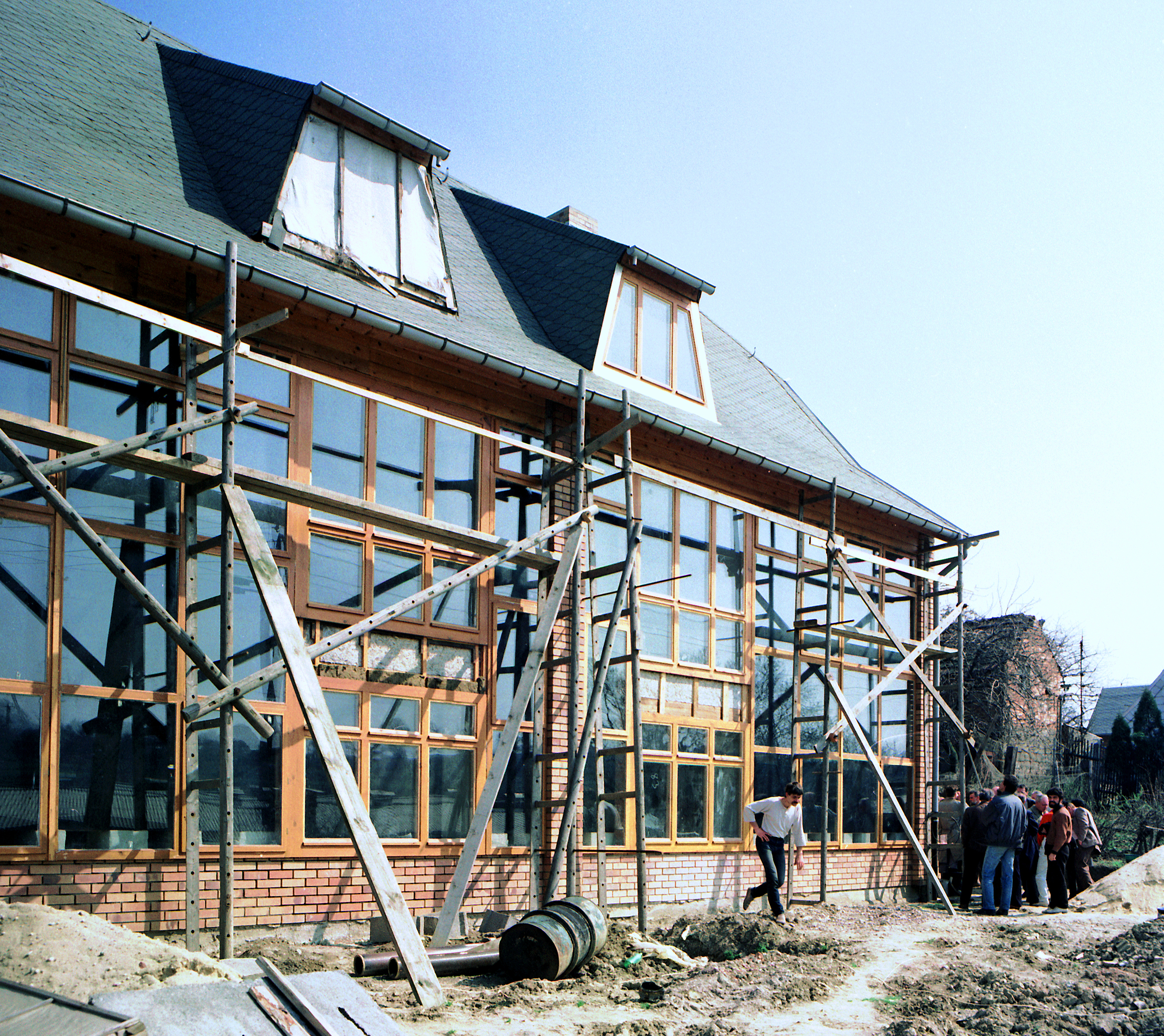
A building using Trombe wall as a passive solar strategy in Hopfgarten, Germany.

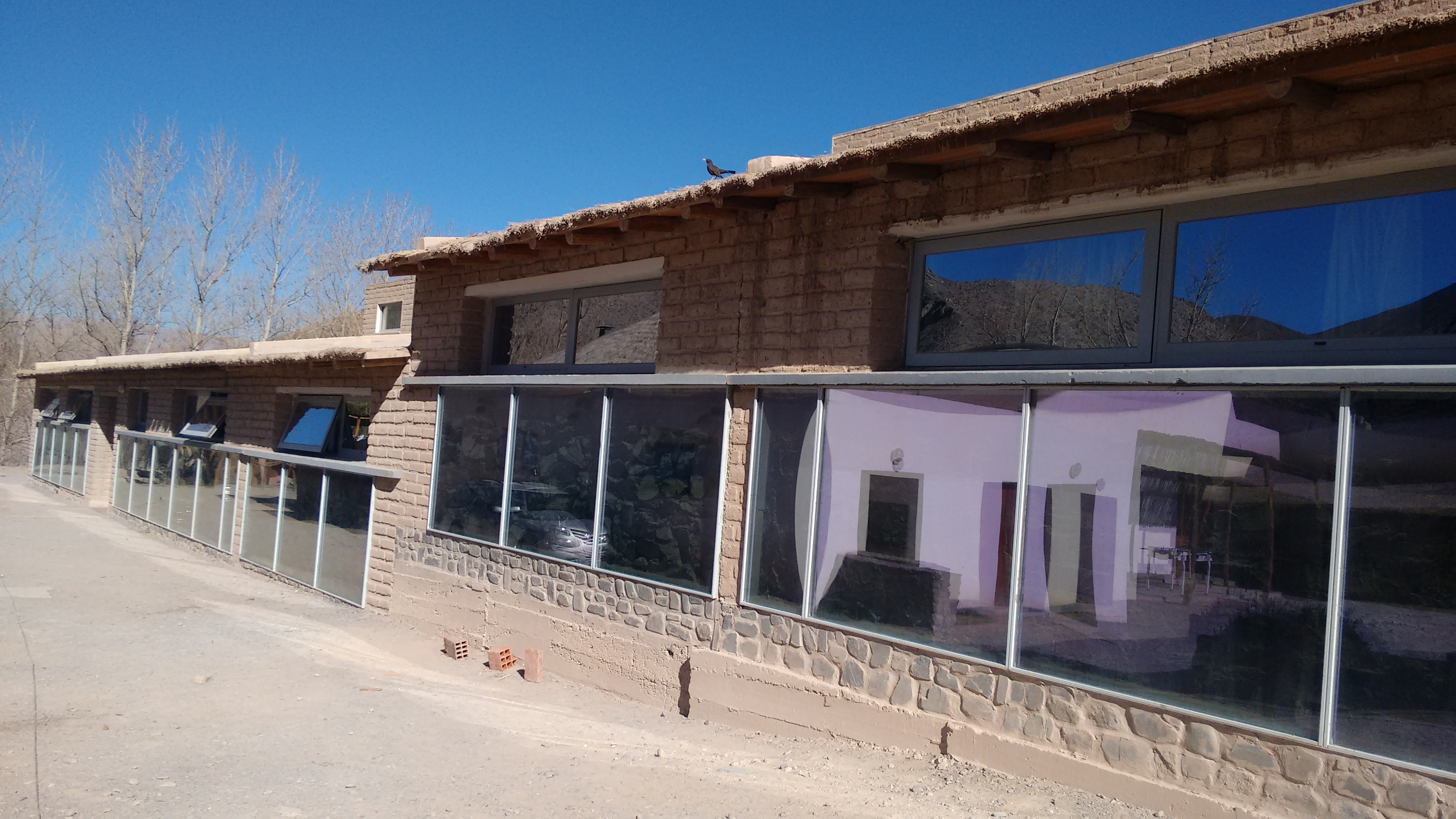
A school with Trombe wall in Salta, Argentina.

To minimize the possible drawbacks of the Trombe wall system, there are additional thermal control strategies to employ to the wall design. For instance, the minimum 4-inch distance between the glass and the mass allows cleaning the glazing and the insertion of a roll-down radiant barrier as needed. Adding a radiant barrier or night insulation between the glazing and the thermal mass reduces nighttime heat losses and summer daytime heat gains. However, to prevent overheating in summers, combining this strategy with an outdoor shading device like shutter, a roof overhang, or an interior shading to block excessive solar radiation from heating the Trombe wall would be the best. Another strategy helps to benefit from the solar collection without some of the drawbacks of the Trombe walls is to use exterior mirror-like reflectors. The additional reflected area helps Trombe walls to benefit more from the sunlight with the flexibility of removing or rotating the reflector device if the solar collection is undesired.

When three different Trombe wall facades with single glass, double glass, and an integrated semi-transparent PV module are compared in hot and humid climate, the single glass provides the highest solar radiation gain due to its higher solar heat gain efficiency. However, it is recommended to use the single glass with a shutter for the evening and night times, to offset its heat losses. High transmission glazing maximizes solar gains of the Trombe wall while allowing to recognize the dark brick, natural stones, water containers, or another attractive thermal mass system behind the glazing as well. However, from an aesthetics perspective, sometimes it is not desirable to distinguish the black thermal mass. As an architectural detail, patterned glass can be used to limit the exterior visibility of the dark wall without sacrificing transmissivity.

The largest Trombe wall in the Northeastern United States is located in NJIT’s Mechanical Engineering Building, at 188 Central Avenue, Newark, NJ.

== Advantages and disadvantages ==
=== Advantages ===
- Indoor temperature swings are 10 °F to 15 °F less with indirect-gain systems than with direct-gain systems. Trombe walls perform better at maintaining a steady indoor temperature than other indirect-gain heating systems.
- Among the passive solar heating strategies, Trombe walls can harmonize the relationship between humans and the natural environment and are widely used because of advantages such as simple configuration, high efficiency, zero running cost and so on.
- While passive solar techniques can reduce annual heating demand up to 25%, specifically using a Trombe wall in building can reduce a building's energy consumption up to 30% in addition to being environmentally friendly.
- Similarly, the energy heating savings of 16.36% can be achieved if a Trombe wall was added to the building envelope.
- Glare, ultraviolet degradation, or reduction of night time privacy are not problems with a full-height Trombe wall system.
- As seen in the Trombe wall design and construction section, the performance of the Trombe walls is well characterized for a variety of design and climate parameters. Possible other modifications can be adding a rigid insulation board to the foundation area and insulation curtains between the glass and thermal mass to avoid heat transfer into the building during undesired periods or heat loss from the Trombe wall to the foundation, or adding a ventilation system into the wall system (if the wall has upper and lower vents) to provide an additional heat transfer by air convection which is desirable to circulate the air evenly.
- Energy delivery to a living space is more controllable than for a direct-gain system. It can be immediate through convection to satisfy daytime loads or delayed through conduction and re-radiation from the thermal mass’ inside surface to meet the nighttime loads.
- Multiple uses of solar energy components help greatly to reduce the overall labor and material cost of constructing a passively heated building.
- Roof ponds, as another passive solar heating strategy, do not work well with multistory buildings since only the top floor is in direct thermal contact with the roof. However, the Trombe walls can be the load-bearing structure of the buildings, so each floor's equator-facing facade can take the advantage of the Trombe wall system.
- Compared to other passive solar systems, using the Trombe walls in commercial buildings with significant internal loads (people and electronic equipment) is useful because of the time lag involved in the transfer of energy through the wall into the space. Since the thermal mass reaches its capacity and becomes able to conduct heat in the evening hours, the space will benefit most by not causing potential overheating problems during occupied hours yet have little effect on heating costs if the building is not occupied after sundown.

=== Disadvantages ===
- Since the Trombe wall is consolidated in one building element - only the equator-facing facade - its impact on the overall building design is limited when compared to roof ponds or direct-gain systems.
- Natural daylight is lost in the full-height Trombe walls unless the system is combined with a direct-gain system or windows are introduced.
- Wall hangings or other type of coverings are not allowed on Trombe walls as they block the radiation emitted from the interior surface of the wall at night.
- The living spaces behind the Trombe walls need alternative access to natural daylight to prevent these spaces from being claustrophobic.
- If a Trombe wall is constructed with upper and lower vents, the upper vent on the thermal mass can suck the heated air from the warmer indoor spaces to the cooler air space between the mass and the glazing (reverse-siphon) at night. To avoid this, it is necessary to use back-draft dampers.
- In regions closer to the equator, although summer ventilation can help to ameliorate overheating, insulating and shading the Trombe wall can minimize this overheating during the hot season.
- It is a very climate-dependent system and external temperature and incident solar radiation levels have a significant role in the energy savings and CO_{2} emission reductions of Trombe walls. Even though Trombe walls built in hot-summer and warm-winter zones provide more energy savings per unit wall area compared to a conventional wall, they display a poorer economic performance if solar radiation is low during the heating season.
- The system requires user action to operate movable insulation or shutters, often on a daily basis.
- In regions where the local users are not familiar with the system, to get the maximum performance from the Trombe wall system, users can be given guidance either by modeling a prototype or providing a user-friendly operation manual for the wall during different seasons or days. This participation can lead to post-project acceptance of the Trombe wall idea and make it easier for locals to reproduce it locally.

=== Mitigating design variations ===
The Kachadorian floor overcomes the disadvantages of the Trombe wall by orienting it horizontally instead of vertically. The Barra system combines actual Trombe walls with a ventilated slab like the Kachadorian floor.

== See also ==
- Passive solar building design
- Kachadorian floor
- Barra system
- List of pioneering solar buildings
