= Thermal mass =

Use of thermal energy storage in building design

In building design, thermal mass is a property of the matter of a building that requires a flow of heat in order for it to change temperature.

Not all writers agree on what physical property of matter "thermal mass" describes. Most writers use it as a synonym for heat capacity, the ability of a body to store thermal energy. It is typically referred to by the symbol C_{th}, and its SI unit is J/K or J/°C (which are equivalent).

Because:

- Christoph Reinhart at MIT describes thermal mass as its volume times its volumetric heat capacity.
- Randa Ghattas, Franz-Joseph Ulm and Alison Ledwith, also at MIT, write that "It [thermal mass] is dependent on the relationship between the specific heat capacity, density, thickness and conductivity of a material" although they don't provide a unit, describing materials only as "low" or "high" thermal mass.
- Chris Reardon equates thermal mass with volumetric heat capacity .

The lack of a consistent definition of what property of matter thermal mass describes has led some writers to dismiss its use in building design as pseudoscience.

== Background ==
The equation relating thermal energy to thermal mass is:

$$Q = C_\mathrm{th} \Delta T\,$$

where Q is the thermal energy transferred, C_{th} is the thermal mass of the body, and ΔT is the change in temperature.

For example, if 250 J of heat energy is added to a copper gear with a thermal mass of 38.46 J/°C, its temperature will rise by 6.50 °C. If the body consists of a homogeneous material with sufficiently known physical properties, the thermal mass is simply the mass of material present times the specific heat capacity of that material. For bodies made of many materials, the sum of heat capacities for their pure components may be used in the calculation, or in some cases (as for a whole animal, for example) the number may simply be measured for the entire body in question, directly.

As an extensive property, heat capacity is characteristic of an object; its corresponding intensive property is specific heat capacity, expressed in terms of a measure of the amount of material such as mass or number of moles, which must be multiplied by similar units to give the heat capacity of the entire body of material. Thus the heat capacity can be equivalently calculated as the product of the mass m of the body and the specific heat capacity c for the material, or the product of the number of moles of molecules present n and the molar specific heat capacity $\bar c$. For discussion of why the thermal energy storage abilities of pure substances vary, see factors that affect specific heat capacity.

For a body of uniform composition, $C_\mathrm{th}$ can be approximated by

$$C_\mathrm{th} = m c_\mathrm{p}$$

where $m$ is the mass of the body and $c_\mathrm{p}$ is the isobaric specific heat capacity of the material averaged over temperature range in question. For bodies composed of numerous different materials, the thermal masses for the different components can just be added together.

== Heat capacity in buildings ==
Christoph Reinhard describes the impact of heat capacity this way:

- If the outside diurnal temperature swing frequently oscillates around a desired (balance point) temperature, adding thermal mass may increase the hours of comfort in a given time interval.
- Thermal mass may act as a liability to keep a space comfortable e.g. when it is only used intermittently.
- Thermal mass has really no effect if the direction of heat flow through the building envelope stays constant for extended periods of time.

Heat capacity is not normally calculated in the engineering of buildings. In the United States and Canada, national building codes and most state and local jurisdictions require that heating and cooling equipment be sized in accordance with Manual J of the Air Conditioning Contractors of America. The Manual J process uses detailed measurements of a building's dimensions, construction, insulation, air-tightness, features and occupant loads, but it does not take into effect the heat capacity. Some heat capacity is presumed in the Manual J process, equipment sized according to Manual J is sized to maintain comfort at the first percentile of temperature for heating and the 99th percentile of temperature for cooling. The process presumes that the building has sufficient heat capacity to maintain comfort during brief excursions outside of those extremes.

=== Construction examples ===
- Earthship
- Rammed earth wall
- Trombe wall

== See also ==
- Specific heat capacity
- Thermal energy storage
- Thermal inertia
