= Degree day =

Measure of heating or cooling used in agriculture

A map of France which shows the different zones

A degree day is a measure of heating or cooling. Total degree days from an appropriate starting date are used to plan the planting of crops and management of pests and pest control timing. Weekly or monthly degree-day figures may also be used within an energy monitoring and targeting scheme to monitor the heating and cooling costs of climate controlled buildings, while annual figures can be used for estimating future costs.

A degree day is computed as the integral of a function of time that generally varies with temperature. The function is truncated to upper and lower limits that vary by organism, or to limits that are appropriate for climate control. The function can be estimated or measured by one of the following methods, in each case by reference to a chosen base temperature:

- Frequent measurements and continuously integrating the temperature deficit or excess;
- Treating each day's temperature profile as a sine wave with amplitude equal to the day's temperature variation, measured from max and min, and totalling the daily results;
- As above, but calculating the daily difference between mean temperature and base temperature;
- As previous, but with modified formulae on days when the max and min straddle the base temperature.

A zero degree-day in energy monitoring and targeting is when either heating or cooling consumption is at a minimum, which is useful with power utility companies in predicting seasonal low points in energy demand.

Degree days are a useful metric for estimating energy consumption required for household heating and cooling, and in this context are formally referred to as heating degree days. Since the escape or ingress of heat due to conduction is proportional to the difference between the indoor and outdoor temperature, the amount of energy needed to maintain the base temperature indoors for some period of time is roughly proportional to the number of degree days. For example, if the base temperature is 18 °C (64 °F) and the outdoor temperature is constant at 10 °C (50 °F) for one day, this counts as 8 degree days (14 degree days in Fahrenheit). Note that the base temperature used for these calculations is 2–3 °C (3.6–5.4 °F) lower than a typical indoor temperature setting, since a building will naturally be slightly warmer than the surrounding air due to body heat of its occupants and absorption of solar radiation.

== Canada ==
=== Growing degree days ===
Growing degree days are based on 5 °C, given that typical plant growth stops below that temperature. Plant growth has been observed to be correlated to the number of degree days. Many plants will fruit after a certain number of degree days. Common examples are strawberries and raspberries. In contrast, deterministic plants will fruit based on the time of year, which the plant determines from the number of consecutive hours of dark. Examples of these include Easter lilies or Christmas cactus.

The paper referenced shows the complexity of plant growth and degree days.

=== Black Fly ===
In Canada, Growing Degree Days are used in order to predict when mosquitoes and blackflies emerge and vanish. But in order to chart the actual growth of insects, degree days above freezing are used.

== United States ==
In the United States, the mean ((max + min)/2) daily temperature in Fahrenheit and a temperature of 65 °F (18.3 °C) is used.

- If the mean daily temperature is 65 °F, no degree days are counted.
- If the mean daily temperature is below 65 °F, the mean degrees Fahrenheit below 65 °F are counted as the heating degree day.
- If the mean daily temperature is above 65 °F, the mean degrees Fahrenheit above 65 °F are counted as the cooling degree day.

The heating and cooling degree days are tallied separately to calculate monthly, seasonal, and yearly total heating and cooling degree days. Heating and cooling degree days closely correlate with heating and cooling demand.

== Standardization ==
The degree day is not an SI derived unit; although the day is acceptable for use in the SI, it is not a decimal multiple of its base unit, the second. (The degree, in Celsius and measured relative to a base temperature, is identical to the kelvin, the SI base unit). Expressed as a proper SI unit, a quantity of kelvin second is four orders of magnitude higher than the corresponding degree day (1 Celsius degree-day is 8.64×10^{4} K·s; 1 Fahrenheit degree-day is 4.8×10^{4} K·s).

== See also ==
- Growing degree day
- Heating degree day
