= Green building in Australia =

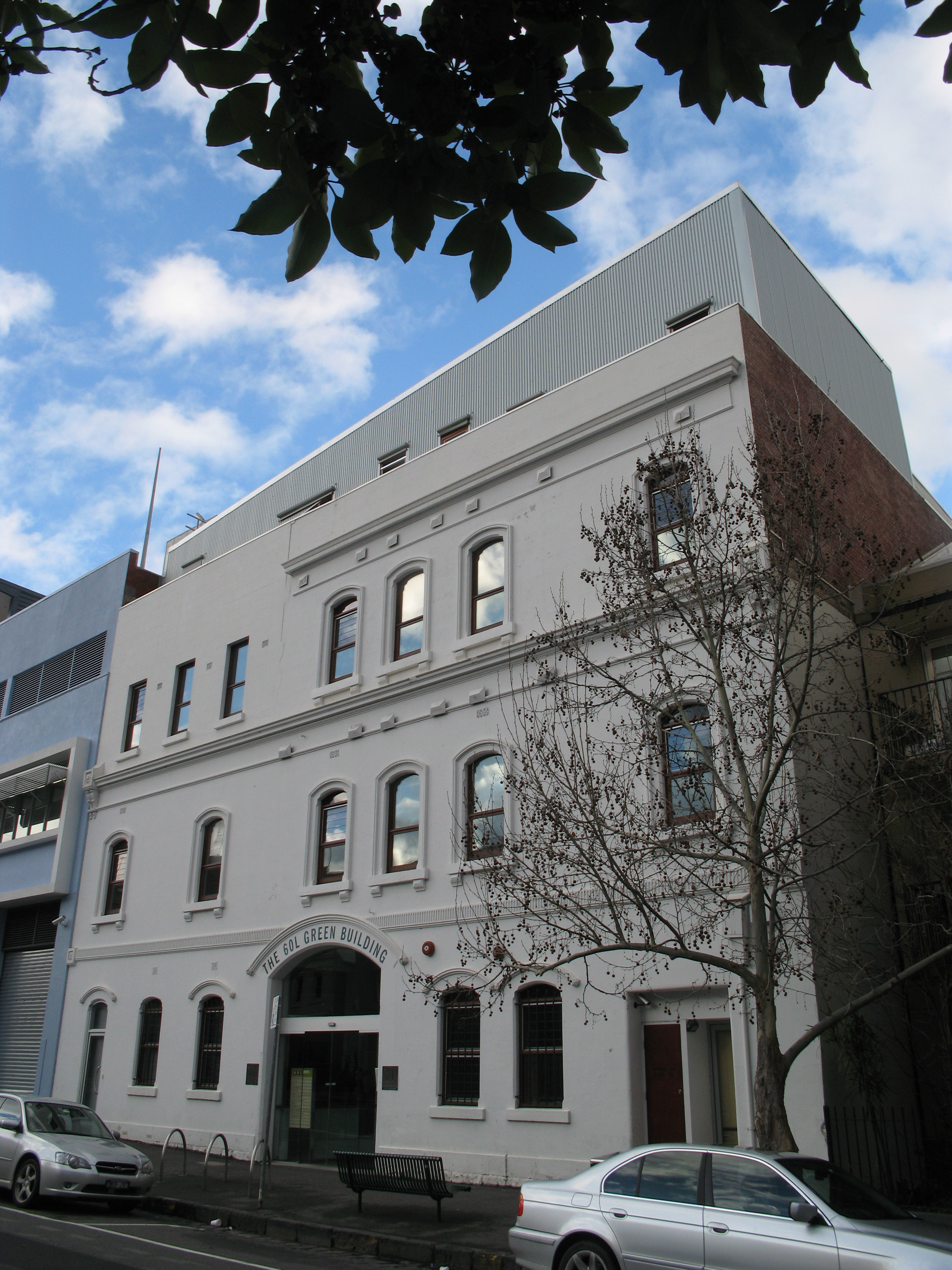
The historically preserved facade of the 60L Green Building in Melbourne

Green buildings in Australia are assessed and rated by a variety of government and independent ratings systems.

The Green Building Council of Australia (GBCA) has developed a green building standard known as Green Star, with the first Green Star rating in Australia awarded to 8 Brindabella Circuit at Canberra Airport in 2004. As of April 2013, over 550 projects have been Green-Star certified, representing 8 million square metres of gross floor area and over 20% of Australia's CBD office space.

EER: Energy Efficiency Rating launched in 1996 and in Australia is a system ranging from 0 to 10 stars and mandatory for buildings in the Australian Capital Territory (ACT) region

The Green Star environmental rating tools for buildings benchmark the potential of buildings based on nine environmental impact categories: Management; Indoor Environment Quality; Energy; Transport; Water; Materials; Land Use & Ecology; Emissions and Innovation. Green Star also has a tool which focuses on neighborhood development.

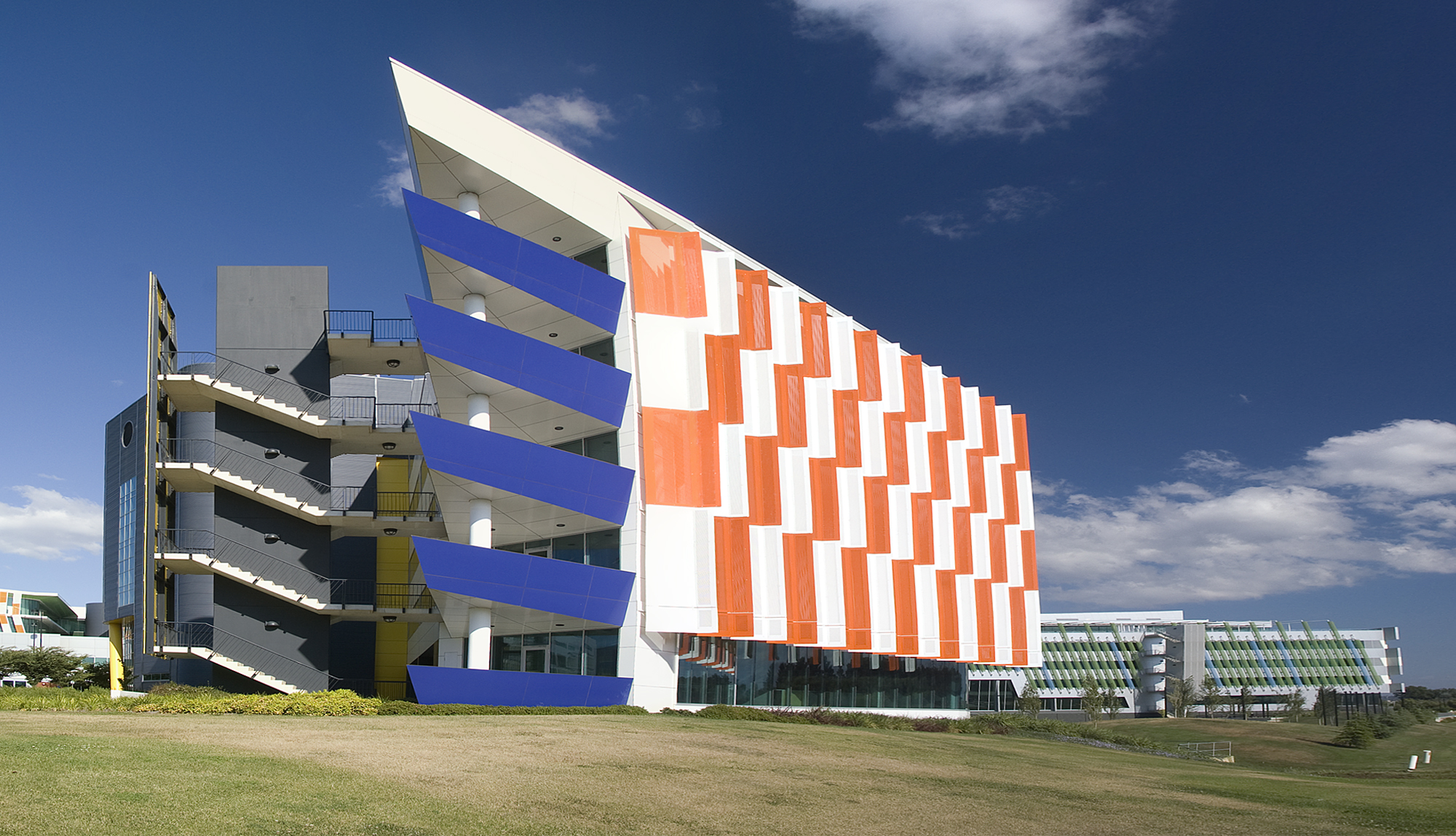
25 Brindabella Circuit at Brindabella Business Park, which has a 5 star NABERS Energy for offices rating

The National Australian Built Environment Rating System (NABERS), is a government initiative to measure and compare the environmental performance of Australian buildings. The NABERS ratings for office buildings include: Energy; Water; Waste and Indoor environment.

A rating for transport is also in development. Together, these ratings can provide a comprehensive picture of the sustainability performance of office buildings and tenancies. Ratings are also available for homes and hotels. Retail and hospital ratings will be launched later this year.

== History ==
The Green Building Council of Australia has certified more than 600 buildings around Australia, among them the 6 Green Star certification of Trevor Pearcey House in Canberra, the refurbished facility of Australian Ethical Investment Ltd. The total cost of the renovation was $1.7 million, and produced an estimated 75% reductions in carbon dioxide emissions, 75% reduction in water usage, and used over 80% recycled materials. The architects were Collard Clarke Jackson Canberra, architectural work done by Kevin Miller, interior design by Katy Mutton.

As in 2022, Australia leads the way globally in rooftop solar power

== Statewide developments ==
=== New South Wales ===
In NSW, an on-line assessment system called BASIX (Building Sustainability Index) requires that all new residential developments to reduce water consumption by 40%, and CO_{2} emissions by 40% for detached dwellings and between 20 and 30% for multi unit dwellings compared to an average baseline. The online system provides designers with a mathematical model of the development that considered the interactions between the energy and water systems of the whole, drawing on climatic and normalised rainfall data for individual locations.

=== South Australia ===
Guidelines for building developments in each project are outlined in the bylaws. The bylaws include various permutations of grey water reuse, reuse of stormwater, capture of rainwater, use of solar panels for electricity and hotwater, solar passive building design and community gardens and landscaping.

=== Victoria ===
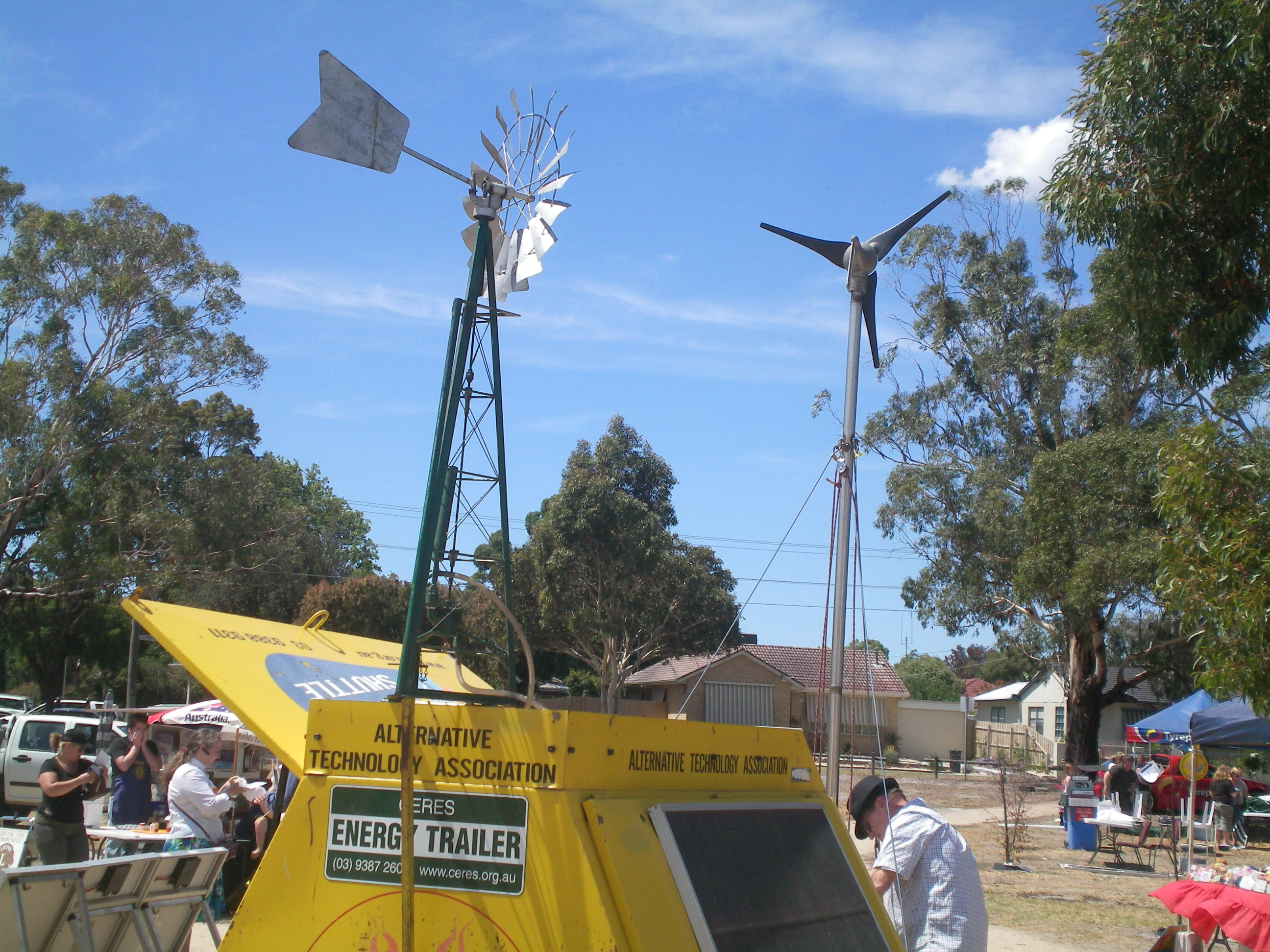
Members of the ATA running a demonstration of rooftop systems at a community festival in Melbourne

Melbourne has a rapidly growing environmental consciousness, many government subsidies and rebates are available for water tanks, water efficient products (such as shower heads) and solar hot water systems.

=== Western Australia ===
In Perth, Western Australia, there are at least three different projects that incorporate the principles of green building. The Office development located in Murray Street, West Perth being designed by Eco Design Consultant in collaboration with Troppo Architects is one of them. The other two are mixed development along Wellington Street, in the city centre. Guidelines for building developments in each project are outlined in the bylaws and the Green Building Council of Australia.

=== Queensland ===
The Queensland government has published some advice on state requirements, codes and laws for sustainable house design and construction.

== Desirable criteria ==
Green building means building sustainably. Ideally a sustainable house will have some or all of the following characteristics:

- Able to retain a comfortable steady year-round temperature
- Minimum heating, cooling, running costs, and embodied energy
- Minimum overall environment impact. Natural lighting, energy generation, efficiency and storage
- Inclusion of renewable, reusable or second hand materials, like wood, stone and bricks
- minimum of offcuts to landfill during construction
- carbon neutral, (net energy generated equals the net energy consumed) if not carbon zero (no net annual emissions from direct fossil fuel combustion) or carbon positive (producing more energy on site than the building requires).
- The size of the house also matters as a larger house typically has greater embodied carbon costs in its construction and greater operational carbon costs for lighting, heating etc. during occupation. A smaller house is more sustainable.
- To minimise its environmental impact, a sustainable house is as self-sufficient as possible in energy, water and food
- Since Australia is in the southern hemisphere, houses are ideally oriented North, South of the Tropic of Capricorn. North of the Tropic, cooling breezes take priority.

== Special resources for home owners, builders and designers ==
The Australian government publishes Your Home: Australia’s guide to environmentally sustainable homes, as a comprehensive guide for homeowners, builders and designers to provide sustainability inspiration. The Design for place web site accompanies Your home. It consists of three energy efficient designs, created by architects, with specifications for each Australian capital city, plus Cairns.

The Alternative Technology Association, branded as Renew Australia, was founded in 1980. It engages in public advocacy for sustainability, sponsors events and publishes a number of resources. These publications include

- Sanctuary: modern green homes A quarterly publication that illustrates innovative sustainable house designs Australia wide
- Renew: technology for a sustainable future is a quarterly publication that introduces new sustainable technologies.
- Sunulator is an online feasibility calculator for grid connected rooftop solar panels
- Tankulator is an online calculator for making decisions on rainwater harvesting and assessing the efficiency of current water tanks
- The Green Rebuild Toolkit was developed in the aftermath of the 2019/2020 catastrophic forest fires, to assist the public and Renew members who lost their often owner built homes, to rebuild or renovate for greater fire resilience.

Sustainable House Day is an annual, largely online event sponsored by Renew Australia, in which members conduct tours of their sustainable homes.

Renew sponsors occasional "Speed date a sustainability expert" events to allow home builders and renovators to have quick meetings with a range of architects and builders with sustainability interests and experience, to review their designs.

Green: design, architecture, landscape, travel is a quarterly lifestyle magazine, which includes articles on sustainable houses.

Building your own home : a comprehensive guide for owner-builders has a sustainability, energy efficiency focus.

== Forms of housing ==
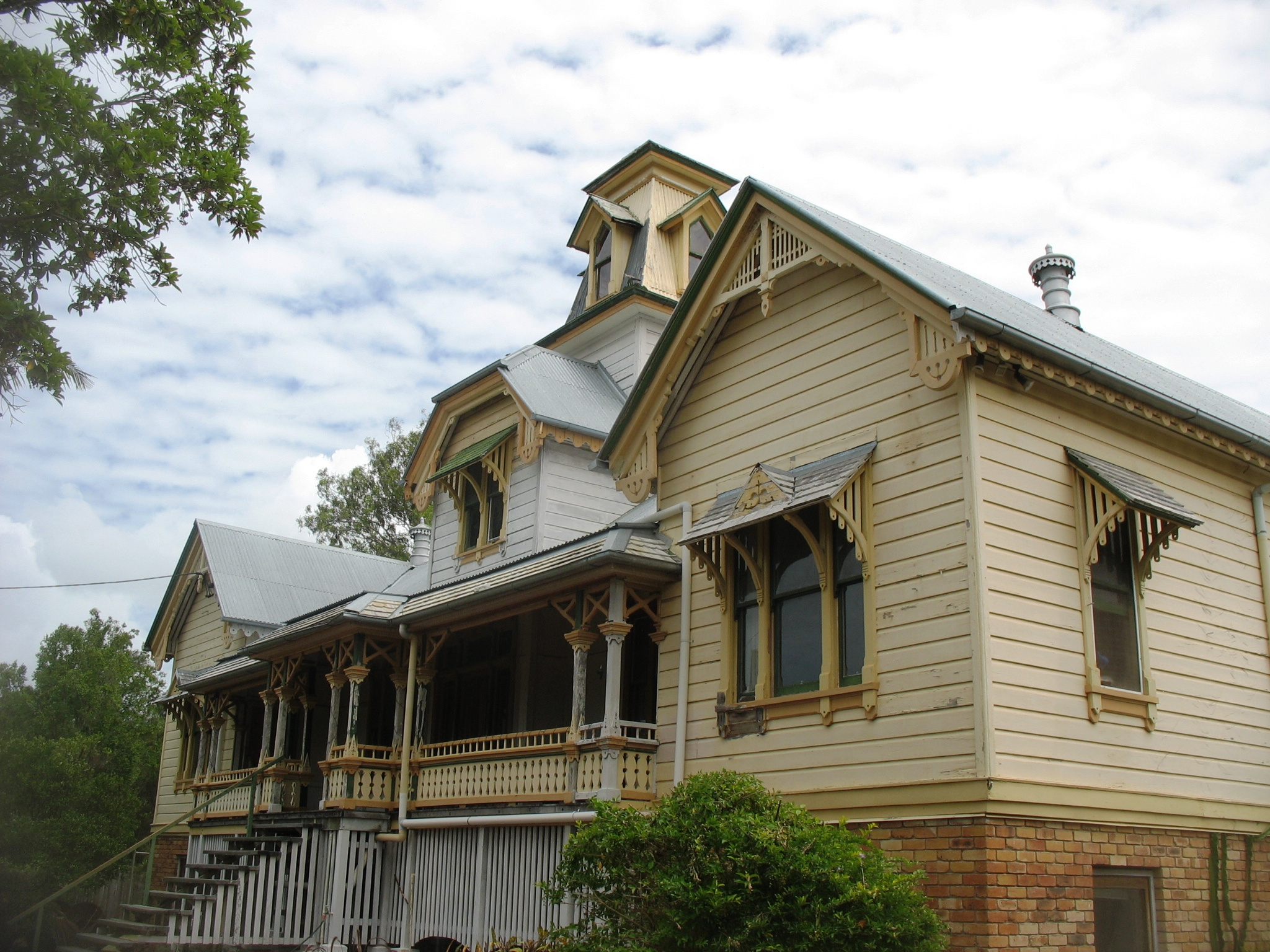
Classic Queenslander, showing verandas, providing ventilation

A favoured traditional housing form is the Queenslander. They are sustainable in that they are built of wood, an arguably renewable resource. Ventilation is excellent, especially in houses with hipped and vented rooves, which allow convective cooling, as well as cross ventilation. They have little thermal mass and are cold in Winter at the southern end of their range. Lighting can be a problem if verandas are encircling, but a north facing veranda on a sunny Winter's morning can be a delightful outdoor living space.

Coober Pedy dug outs are another vernacular Australian housing form. They meet the criteria of sustainability by having an even year round temperature, despite extreme outside seasonal and daily fluctuations. Lighting is provided by windows, skylights and doors into hillsides, and ventilation by shafts.

We have a number of believers in off-grid sustainable houses, some of whom are survivalists

Tiny houses have a certain following. They are a commitment to minimalism is possessions and number of visitors and inhabitants, but sustainable in their small size. They are prone to problems of grid connections (water, energy, waste disposal), and if built on land not owned by the homeowner, owners can find themselves summarily “homeless” if the land they occupy is sold.

Tasmanian House initiative emphasises individuals taking direct responsibility for designing and constructing their own homes, often enabled by freely available building plans and minimal paid professional involvement. Homes are built sustainably and chemical free, utilising traditional materials and building techniques, while meeting contemporary quality and living standards.

Houses with a NatHERS rating of ten stars have been built in Australia. One is at Cape Paterson, near Wonthaggi on the Bass Strait coast of Victoria. (climate zone 5) Josh Byrne's house is an experimental and demonstration house in Perth Western Australia. (climate zone 5) Another is in Caloundra, in South East Queensland (climate zone 2) The Ten Star House in Woodforde, Adelaide (climate zone 5) was exhibited at Sustainable House Day, 2021 and can be seen in a video tour and series of professional photographs online.

Passive houses, which use solar energy for space heating and cooling, were invented in Germany as Passivhaus are gaining in popularity.

== Standards for sustainability ==
=== Australian ===
Australia's climate zones. The National Construction Code has eight climate zones (as published by the Australian Building Codes Board)

The Nationwide House Energy Rating Scheme (NatHERS) It generates a star rating of a home's energy efficiency, out of maximum of ten. After a long campaign, new houses are required to reach a star rating of seven under the National Construction Code.

BASIX (Building Sustainability Index) is a mandatory planning tool for new homes and renovations in New South Wales worth more than $50000.

Housing Industry Association GreenSmart program This program provides a training program for HIA members in sustainable building design and techniques. Awards are given annually for the designers and builders of the most environmentally sustainable homes.

The Water Efficiency Labelling and Standards is a labelling scheme to allow consumers to choose the most efficient water using devices, and conserve water in home use.

The Window Energy Rating Scheme (WERS) is a consumer labelling scheme for window energy efficiency and its impact on the whole house. It is managed by the Australian Glass and Window Association.

Energy Rating A consumer labelling scheme for energy efficient appliances.

Good Environmental Choice Australia certifies consumer products in general for environmental sustainability.

BERS (Building Energy Rating Scheme) Pro is based on the same underlying CSIRO engine as NatHERS. It rates the energy efficiency of Australian homes in all climate zones, from the tropics to the mountains. This tool is far better for rating a home, unit or townhouse energy performance than the alternative prescriptive method.

FirstRate is also based on the same underlying CSIRO engine as NatHERS. It is interactive with a graphic user interface. Thermal performance assessors and designers can use it against floor plans to arrive at an energy rating.

AS3959: 2018 Construction of buildings in bushfire prone areas. This is the Australian Standard on this topic and is accessible from SAI Global.

The Residential Efficiency Scorecard allows renters and homeowners to obtain an impartial and objective assessment of the NatHERs rated energy efficiency of their homes, with a range of practical improvement suggestions. it is managed by the Victorian government, for the benefit of all Australian governments, and assessments are available around Australia.

Livable Housing Australia has a set of guidelines to ensure that houses are suitable for everyone with ease of access and navigation and can be easily and cost-effectively modified as the residents' life circumstances change.

=== International ===
Green Tick® Global A New Zealand invention, now global, that certifies products, events, food, businesses, supply chains, building sites and services for carbon emissions, fair trade, GE free, naturalness and sustainability.

Forest Stewardship Council Certifies forest products, including wood, for the social, economic and environmental impacts of their harvesting and removal.

BREEAM's (Building Research Establishment Environmental Assessment Method) Green Guide A British certification scheme for building sustainability.

Global GreenTag Building products certification scheme for sustainability.

== See also ==
- List of sustainable buildings in Australia
