= Council House 2 =

Coordinates: 37°48′51″S 144°57′59.8″E

Council House 2 (CH_{2})
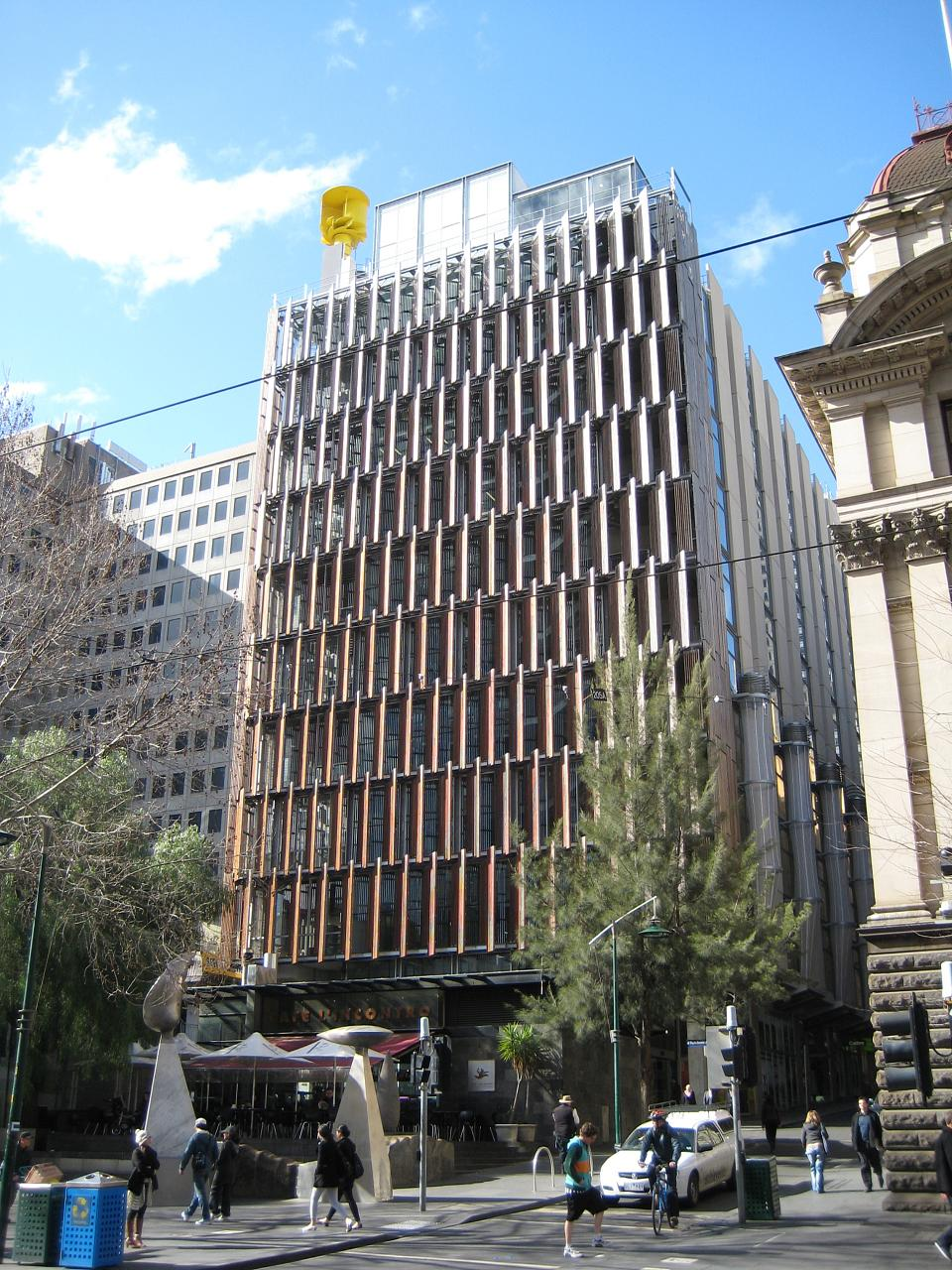
- Interactive map of the Council House 2 (CH_{2}) area

General information
- Type: Office
- Location: Melbourne, Australia, 240 Little Collins Street
- Current tenants: City of Melbourne
- Construction started: 2004
- Completed: 2006
- Owner: City of Melbourne

Technical details
- Floor count: 10
- Floor area: 12,536 m^{2} (134,940 sq ft)

Design and construction
- Architect: City of Melbourne in association with Mick Pearce with DesignInc.
- Structural engineer: Bonacci Group
- Services engineer: Lincolne Scott
- Civil engineer: Bonacci Group
- Quantity surveyor: Donald Cant Watts Corke
- Main contractor: Hansen Yuncken

Council House 2 (also known as CH_{2}), is an office building located at 240 Little Collins Street in the Melbourne central business district, Australia. It is used by the City of Melbourne council, and in April 2005, became the first purpose-built office building in Australia to achieve a maximum Six Green Star rating, certified by the Green Building Council of Australia. CH_{2} officially opened in August 2006.

== Environmental features ==
Comparing to a building with a six Green Star rating, CH_{2}'s emissions will be 64% lower. When compared to the existing Council House next door, it is expected to:

- reduce electricity consumption by 85%
- reduce gas consumption by 87%
- produce only 13% of the emissions
- reduce water mains supply by 72%

Features include new LCD computer monitors, which will consume 77% less energy, and new T5 light fittings which should consume 65% less energy. The building also houses 48 m^{2} of solar panels, which provide 60% of hot water, as well as a gas-fired cogeneration plant which provides 40% of the building's overall electricity and heating, with significantly reduced carbon emissions. The cogeneration plant is powered by a Capstone C65 microturbine which produces 65 kW of electricity and 130 kW of hot water.

Of the total construction cost of $51 million, $12 million were invested in energy, water and waste innovation. The time for payback is expected to be less than ten years.

== Design ==
CH_{2} is meant to be a 'lighthouse project' for new building developments, aiming to influence future design to be more sustainable and efficient. Some objectives when designing the building were to be greenhouse neutral and improve the overall employee wellbeing. Different strategies were used when doing this but all were focused around a sustainability aspect.

Biomimicry was a large component in designing the building. The building's principal design architect, Mick Pearce, incorporated a system previously and successfully used in the Eastgate Centre in Harare. The heating, ventilating, and cooling system (hvac) is designed with strategies taken from a termite mound. In the termite mound, the cool wind is drawn into the base of the mound, via channels and the 'coolth' is stored using wet soil. As the air warms, it flows upwards and out of the mound via vents. This gives the mound the ability to keep a stable temperature. CH_{2} uses similar strategies with its system by effectively using natural convection, ventilation stacks, thermal mass, phase change material, and water for cooling. Another strategy used taken from nature is the skin system. The façade is composed of an epidermis (outer skin) and dermis (inner skin). The 'dermis' of the building consists of the outside zone to house the stairs, lifts, ducts, balconies, sunscreens and foliage with the inner line defining the extent of the 'fire compartment'. The dermis was designed with lightweight constructing using a steel frame. The epidermis provides the micro-environment including the primary sun and glare control for the building while creating a semi enclosed micro-environment.

Ventilation stacks are implemented on the north and south façades of the building. These stacks are used to channel air. The north stacks receive more sun so they are black to absorb heat, which in turn encourages the warm air from the building to rise up out of the stacks. The south stacks are used to channel down cold air through the vents. These stacks also offer shading for office windows.

The ceilings are made from pre-cast concrete, with a 'wavy' shape, to optimise surface area, which allows for an increase in thermal mass capacity. The thermal mass in the concrete is flushed at night, through a night purge, absorbing 'coolth' form the night air and allowing it to absorb heat from the space during the day. With the 'wavy' design, heated air is collected at ceiling height, and then channelled out of the building and into the ventilation stacks. Radiant cooling is also a strategy used by running chilled water through beams and ceiling panels. Chilled panels cool the rising warm air, which then drops, creating a natural convection current. Phase change material is used to cool the water for the chilled beams and panels. It efficiently helps to keep the water circulating through the beams and panels at a desired temperature. The phase change material is often referred to as the 'battery' of the building because of its purpose of storing the 'coolth'.

Natural day lighting was a difficult task for the CH_{2} team due to the building's orientation and position in relation to surrounding buildings, and the requirement for a deep open plan office space. The best design techniques for CH_{2} to allow the most natural light included a synergy between windows size and air ducts, light shelves to reflect light into the office area, vaulted ceilings to allow further light penetration, shading on north, west, and east façades, and finally timber louvres to control light penetration from the afternoon western sun. The light shelves were placed on the north façade which in turn will create a soft indirect light on the roof space. These light shelves are placed externally and made of fabric in a steel frame. The vaulted ceilings allow for more natural light filtering to the deeper parts of the office space. Locating the windows at the highest point of the curve improved this technique. The east facing façade uses a perforated metal system for shading that also acts like a thermal chimney. Heat rises pulling air through the eastern part of the building allowing it to be naturally ventilated. The north facing façade is composed of steel trellises and balconies supporting vertical gardens nine stories high. The foliage protects the building from the sun and also filters sunlight for a reduction of indoor glares. Light shelves are used to provide shading as well as reflect natural light into the building. These light shelves are placed externally and made of fabric in a steel frame. The west facing façade is covered with a system of timber louvres that pivot to optimise the penetration of natural light and views. These louvres also protect the façade from the harsh western sun. The louvres open and close depending on the amount of sun that is hitting the western façade. The louvres are made from untreated recycled timber and are moved by a computer-controlled hydraulic system. The building also uses artificial lighting throughout to provide a sufficient amount of light when natural light is not available. These lights use the low-energy T5 luminaries which achieve a lighting power density of less than 2.5 watts/m^{2} per 100 lux.

Shower towers are used on the southern façade. These towers draw outside air from above street level and cool the air by evaporation to form the shower of water. The cool air is then supplied to the retail spaces and the cool water is used to pre-cool the water coming from the chilled water panels. The towers are made from tubes of lightweight fabric 1.4 meters in diameter. Testing from these towers has shown a temperature reduction of 4 to 13 degrees Celsius from the top of the tower to the bottom of the tower.

The designers also used an innovative concept of design by using the same amount of foliage on the building as would have been present if the site was still in its original natural vegetated state. This is accomplished by using a roof garden, which also serves as a break-out and recreation space for staff. The northern façade also incorporates planter boxes situated east and west of each northern balcony.

== Indoor environment quality ==
A main concern when designing CH_{2} was the indoor environment quality (IEQ), and many steps were made to optimise this in particular. With an improvement in the overall IEQ designers believed this could lead to fewer sick days of occupants, fewer headaches and better well-being while staff are at work. The City of Melbourne's aim was to create a healthy, comfortable, adaptable and stimulating work environment for the staff. Strategies used to improve the IEQ include a well-designed working environment, fresh air, natural light, greenery, and use of materials that emit low amounts of volatile organic compounds (VOCs). Not only do these strategies improve the work place, but also can save the city money based on productivity gains.

Displacement ventilation was used as the primary ventilation in CH_{2}. The advantages of using a displacement ventilation system include increased cost effectiveness in operation, improved air quality within occupied zone, greater operational efficiency, ability to conceal, quiet, and finally flexibility. The minimum fresh air requirement at CH_{2} is 22.5 litres/second/person. This is much higher than the Australian Standard of 10 litres/second/person (AS 1668.2) The higher turnover rate was chosen because research has shown that low fresh air requirements can be directly linked to low productivity and sickness, including colds and flu.

Natural light was optimised in the design of CH_{2} by creating a wavy ceiling, use of light shelves, larger windows at the bottom of building and smaller windows at the top, use of colours to accentuate the natural light, and the concepts that windowed areas were shared by all not owned individuals.

The interior of the building is also decorated with a variety of plant life with aesthetic purposes, as well as research that shows that plants reduce the amount of VOCs in the air. In addition to controlling VOCs with plants, CH_{2} planners chose materials to keep the indoor pollutants at a minimum. Low-VOC paints, low-VOC carpets, low-VOC adhesives and sealants, and low-emission formaldehyde composite wood products are all used in the interiors of the building.

== Green Star Rating ==
Green Star rates the environmental performance of a building based, in this case, on its design. It is administrated by the Green Building Council of Australia (GBCA). The rating looks at the following aspects of the building process:

- Building Input
- Management
- Indoor Environment Quality (IEQ)
- Energy
- Transport
- Water
- Materials
- Land Use & Ecology
- Emissions
- Innovation

Each of these aspects are then broken up into smaller categories that cover a wide range of topics.

Green Star is a public method of demonstrating commitment to environmentally responsible building. It provides a standard language to discuss sustainability for buildings.

On 22 March 2005, CH_{2} building design was awarded a 6 Star rating under Green Star – Office Design v1. The following table presents the points possible, and points awarded for CH_{2}

Category	Points Available	Points Awarded
Management	12	10
Indoor Environment Quality	26	20
Energy	24	16
Transport	11	9
Water	12	12
Materials	14	9
Land Use & Ecology	8	2
Emissions	13	9
Innovation (not included in total)	(5)	(5)
Total Points	120	87

== Post-Occupancy Reports ==
Note: Post-occupancy reports were recorded after one year of building use while the building was still going under adjustments.

Thermal Comfort: Thermal dissatisfaction ratings should be below 10% in most locations of the building. The perceived overall thermal comfort is also good but the airflow is perceived to be to low.

Air Quality:The air quality of CH_{2} is excellent in terms of measured pollutant levels. The occupants also perceive the air quality to be better. The formaldehyde concentrations are much lower than compared to common office buildings. The overall air quality is excellent due to the 100% fresh air intake and the use of low toxicity materials used in all furnishings and finishes as well as an extensive use of indoor plants.

Noise Levels: Ambient noise levels and reverberation times were considered ideal but the occupant satisfaction ratings for now were average to poor and were generally worse than benchmarks. This is due to the open floor layout, which improves communication between employees, but allows for unwanted interruptions. White noise increases satisfaction scores on one level compared to the rest of the building (10–18%).

Lighting: The background lighting levels are sufficient, and the recommended task illuminances could be achieved if personal task lighting was switched on. Occupant satisfaction for lighting is average to poor in CH_{2} and is worse than some Building Uses Studies benchmarks (BUS).

Perceived Productivity: Three-quarters of CH_{2} occupants rate the building as having a positive or neutral effect on productivity, compared to 39% in the original Council House. CH_{2} is rated in the top 20% of Australian buildings for perceived productivity.

Perceived Worker Health: CH_{2} is rated very highly for perceived healthiness, and is considered to have low levels of occupant reported rates for building related health symptoms. Absenteeism and staff turnover has not changed but more time must pass to have conclusive data.

Overall: 80% of occupants prefer CH_{2} to their previous accommodation. It was also seen that the staff productivity improved 10.9% resulting in a cost savings of over two million dollars. The improvement results in a seven-year payback period for the buildings environmental features, three years ahead of the suspected schedule of ten years.

== Awards and recognition ==
2004

- Exemplar, Imagining the Future Award, Year of the Built Environment Awards, CRC Construction Innovation in association with DesignInc.

2005

- Special Projects Initiative, Award of Excellence LG Pro Local Government Professionals
- 6 Start Rating Certification, Green Start Rating Green Building Council of Australia
- Green Building Award, World Environment Day Awards 2005 United Nations Association

2006

- Greenhouse Expenditure Award, Eco-Buy Awards 2006
- Recycled Expenditure Award, Eco-Buy Awards 2006
- The Hey Big Spender Award, Eco-Buy Awards 2006
- Environmental Planning or Conservation Award, Awards for Planning Excellence 2006, Planning Institute of Australia, Victoria Division

2007

- Environment Planning or Conservation, National Awards for Planning Excellence, Planning Institute of Australia
- President's Award, National Awards for Planning Excellence, Planning Institute of Australia
- Sustainable Architecture Award, 2007 Victorian Architecture Awards, Royal Australian Institute of Architects, Victorian Chapter in association with DesignInc.
- President's Award, 2007 Excellence in Property Awards, Australian Property Institute, Victorian Division
- Sustainable Architecture Award, 2007 National Architecture Awards, Royal Australian Institute of Architects
- Finalist, Sustainable Design, Global Innovator's Awards 2007 CoreNet Global
- Environment and Sustainability Award, Victorian Engineering Excellence Awards 2007, Engineers Australia, Victorian Division in association with Lincolne Scott and Bonacci Group
- Sustainability Award, IDEA Excellence Awards 2007, (Inside) Australian Design Review in association with DesignInc.
- Sire William Hudson Award, Australian Engineering Excellence Awards 2007 Engineers Australia in association with Lincolne Scott and Bonacci Group
- Sustainability Building Award (projects under £25,000), Sustainable Building Services Awards UK Chartered Institution of Building Services Engineers (CIBSE) Awarded to Lincolne Scott

2010

- 6 Star – As Built Rating Certification, Green Star Rating, Green Building Council of Australia

== Gallery ==
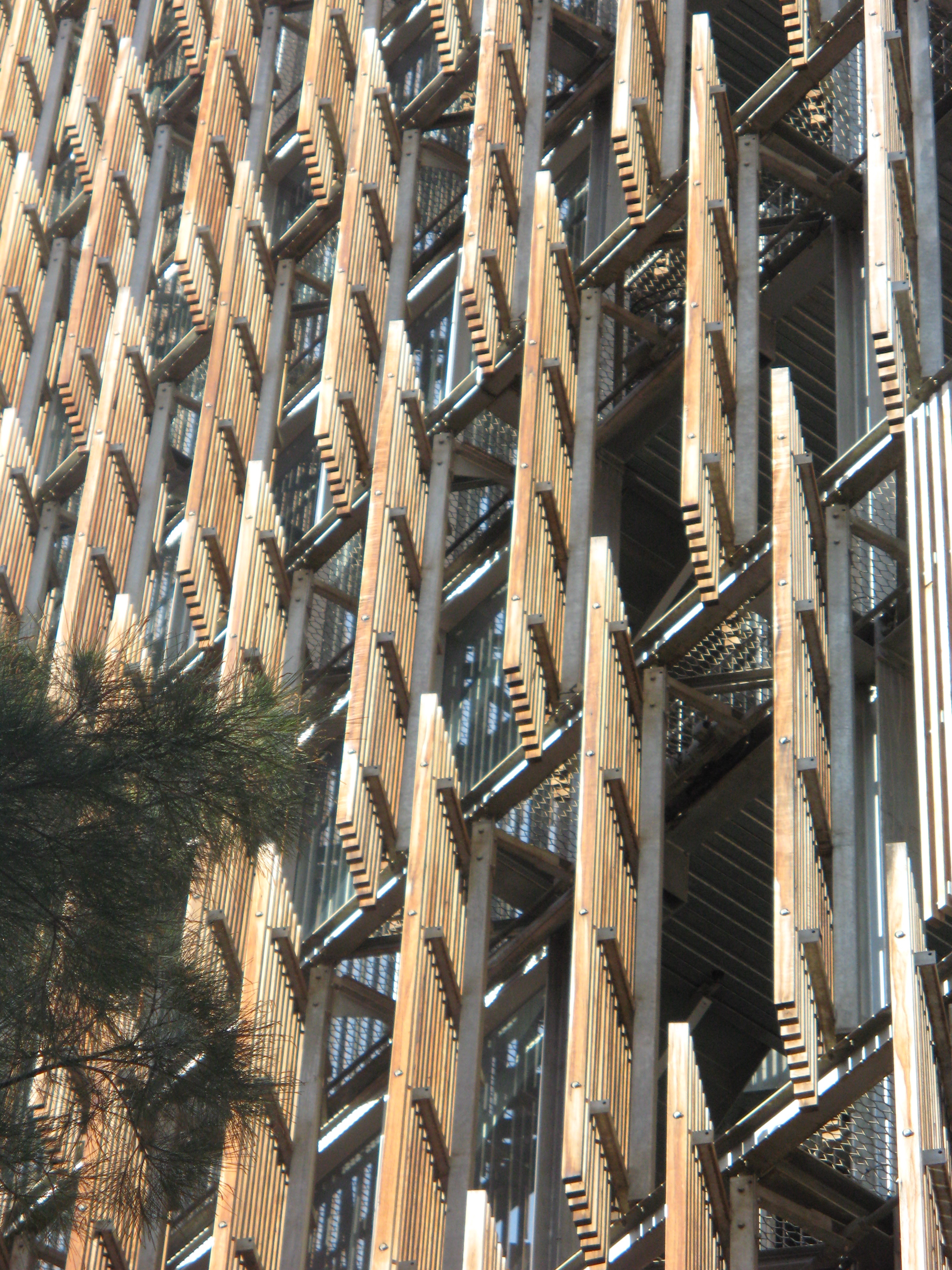
Detail of the shutters on the Western facade

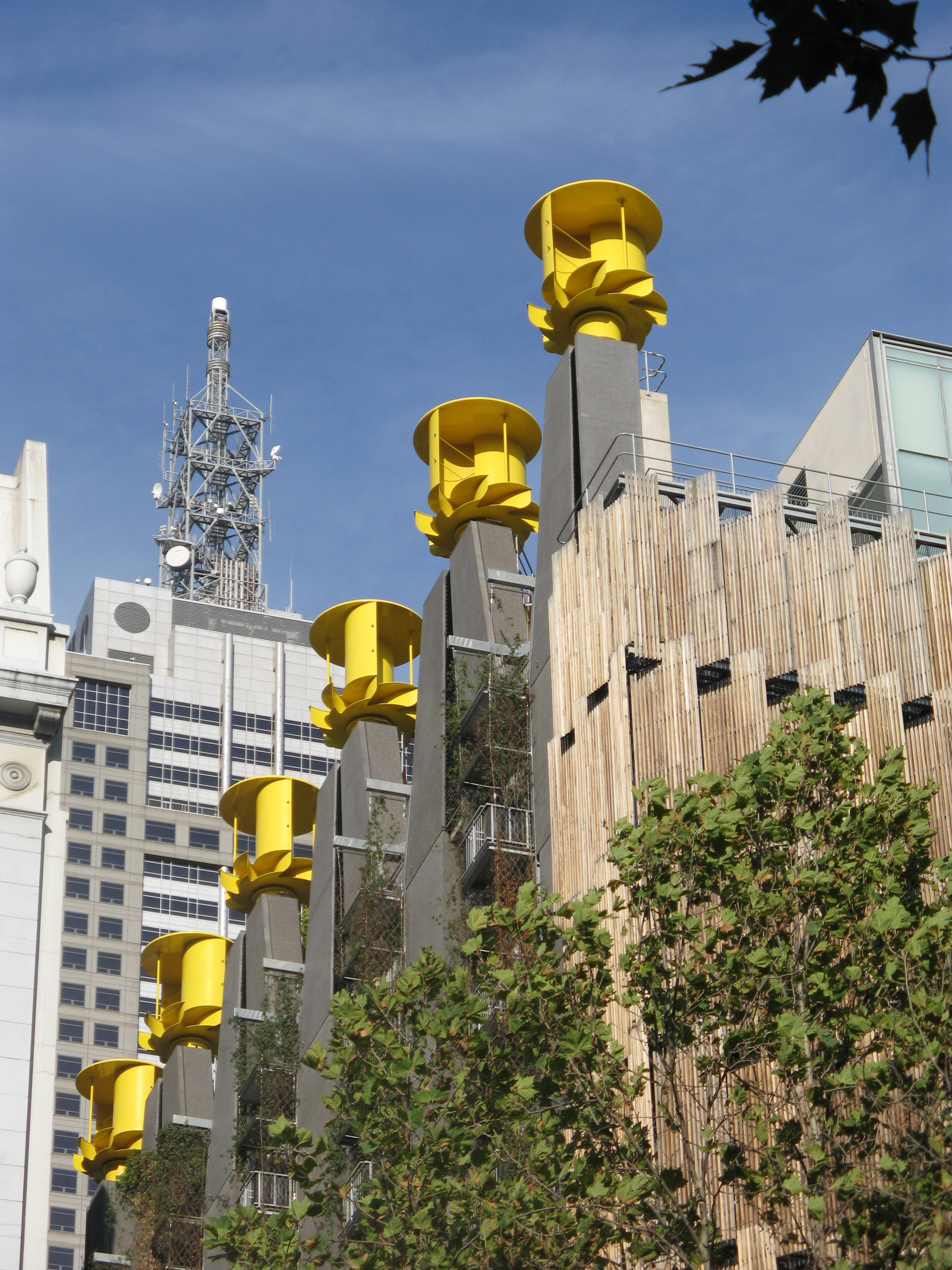
East-West side and rooftop turbines

== See also ==
- Sustainable buildings in Australia
- Building-integrated renewable energy
- Passive solar building design
- Sustainable design
