= Economic optimization of electric conductors =

Economic optimization of electric conductors (also known as economic cable sizing - ECS) is the process of selecting cable based on both safety and economic analysis. The objective of ECS is to minimise lifetime costs of cables and to reduce emissions due to loses in cables.

== Cable selection criteria ==
Four criteria are typically used for cable selection:

1. Current-carrying capacity;
2. Voltage drop;
3. Short-circuit temperature rise; and
4. Economic optimization.

Until recently, energy costs were sufficiently low that the ongoing cable losses were not significant. However, there are two recent effects that have changed this situation:

1. The increased cost of energy; and
2. The increased allowable operating temperature of cables.

== Principles of economic optimization ==
There are two primary lifetime costs associated with power cables:

1. Upfront costs: the larger the cable the more costly the cable is to purchase and install (the cost of installation is usually not a significant factor).
2. Ongoing costs: electrical energy losses in the cable while it is carrying current. The larger the cable, the smaller the losses – hence the lower the ongoing costs.

The total lifetime cost is the sum of the costs, all of which are related to cable size. The objective of economic cable sizing is to find the lowest overall total cost while maintaining safety standards. There are several approaches to this which are all based upon these fundamental principles. The following standards cover the economics sizing of cables:

1. IEC 60287-3-2.Electric cables - Calculation of the current rating - Part 3-2.
2. JCS 4521-1 Calculation of the Environmental Current Rating for the Electric Cables, Part 1.
3. AS/NZS 3008.1.1:2017 Electrical installations—Selection of cables.

== Australia ==
In New South Wales, Australia it is permissible to use the calculated energy savings that are due to implementing ECS in BASIX (Building Sustainability Index) applications. Each ECS based application is assessed on a case-by-case basis.
