= Mick Pearce =

Zimbabwean architect (born 1938)

Mick Pearce (born 2 June 1938) is a Zimbabwean architect.

== Biography ==
Pearce was born on 2 June 1938, in Harare, then called Salisbury. He received his diploma with distinction at the Architectural Association School of Architecture in London in 1962. He has undertaken projects in the UK, Zambia, Zimbabwe, Australia and China as well as South Africa.

In the last 20 years Pearce has focused on sustainable architecture and has explored the principles of biomimicry, which is the imitation of natural processes and the use of natural materials. One of the goals of his architecture style is to minimise damage to the environment. He prefers to use local materials and traditional technologies such as windmills.

== Notable projects ==
One of his most well-known buildings is the Eastgate Shopping Centre in Harare. For the system of temperature control in the building, Pearce was inspired by the construction of termite mounds. By using this system he combined energy saving and used natural ventilation and air conditioning. The building uses about 10% of the energy used for ventilation by buildings of a comparable size.

Pearce left Zimbabwe in 2000 as a result of the conflict in his home country and worked in Australia, where he co-designed Council House 2 (CH_{2}) in Melbourne, among other buildings. After three years working with Vanke in China, he returned to Zimbabwe in 2012.

In 2003, Pearce was honored for his innovations in the field of ecological and sustainable design with a Prince Claus Award from the Netherlands.

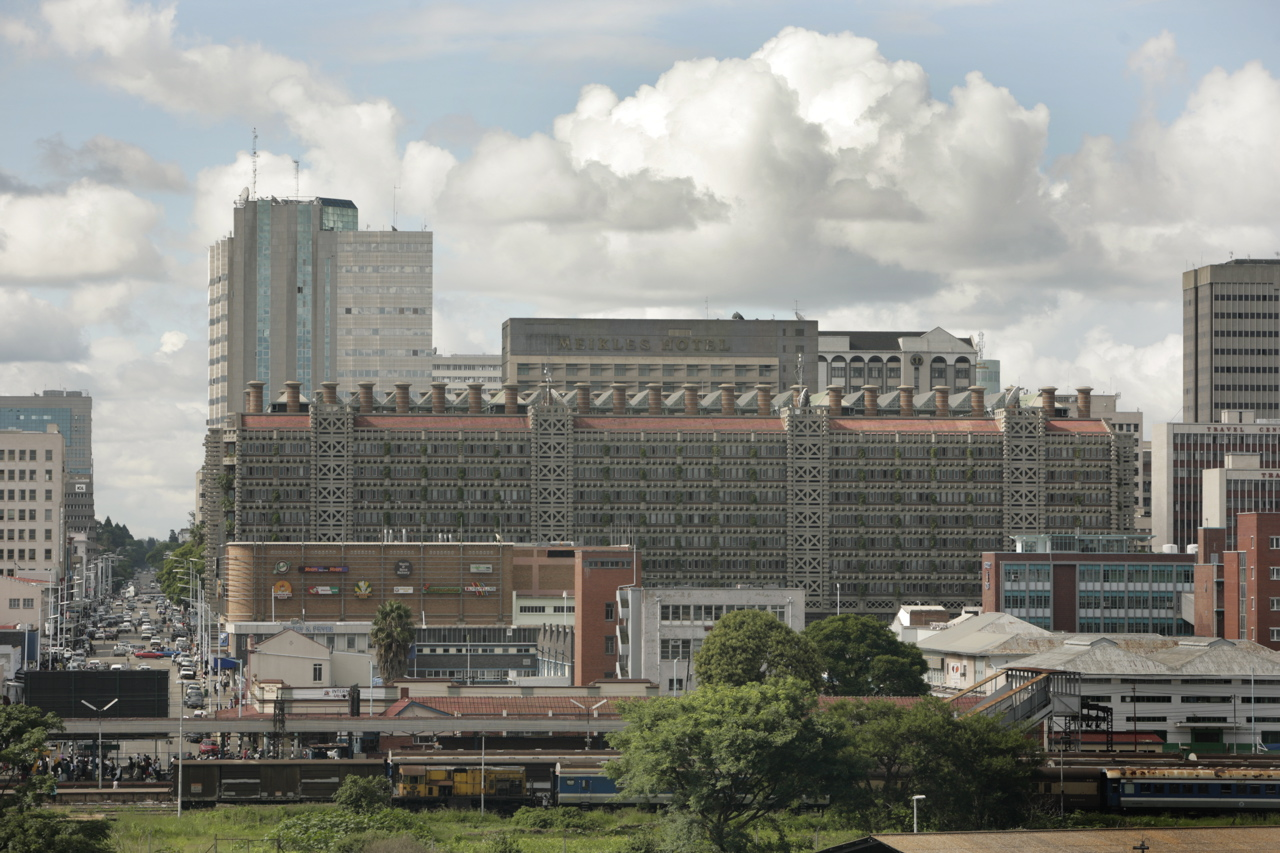
Eastgate Centre

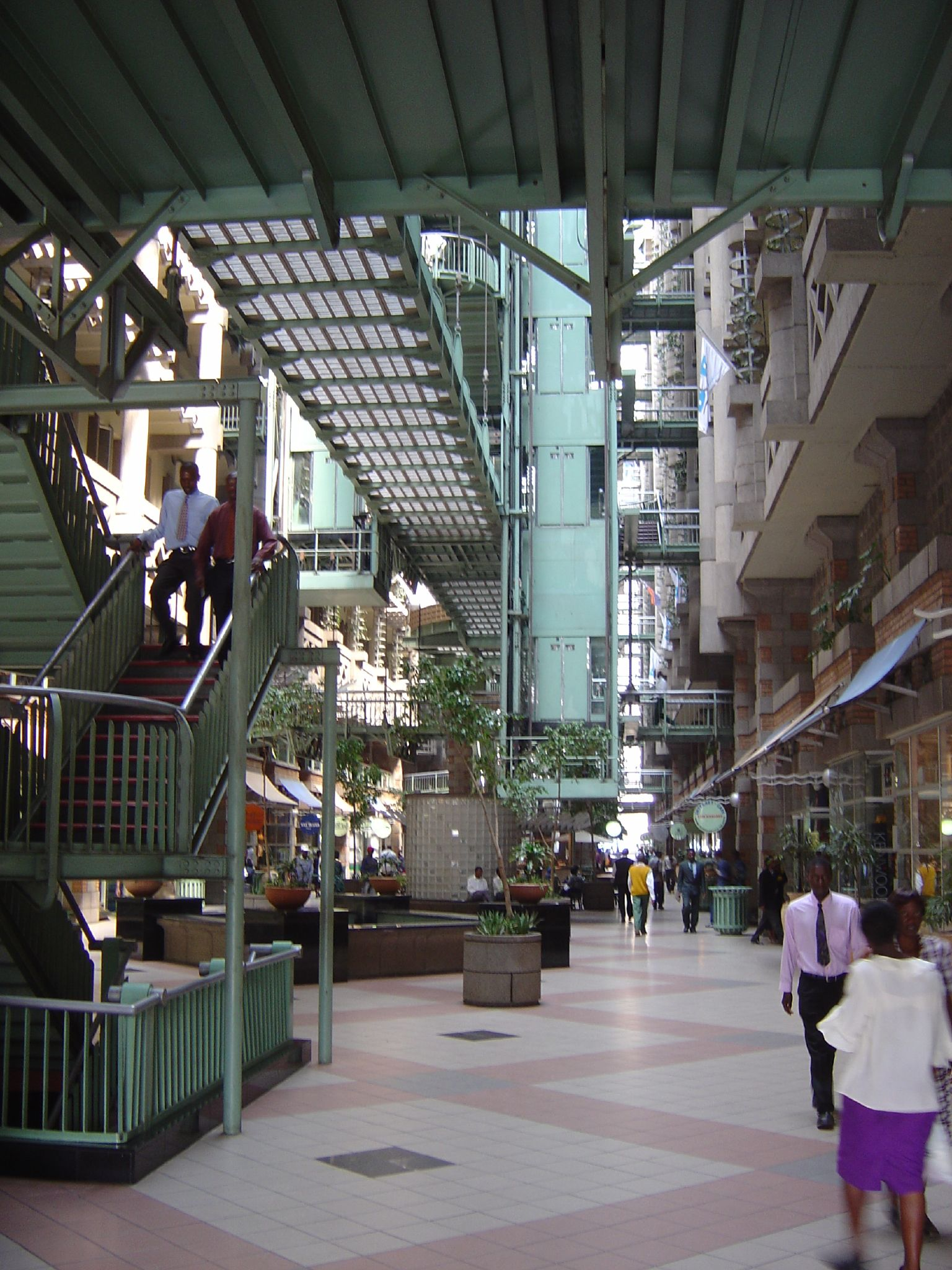
Eastgate Shopping Mall
