= List of sustainable buildings in Australia =

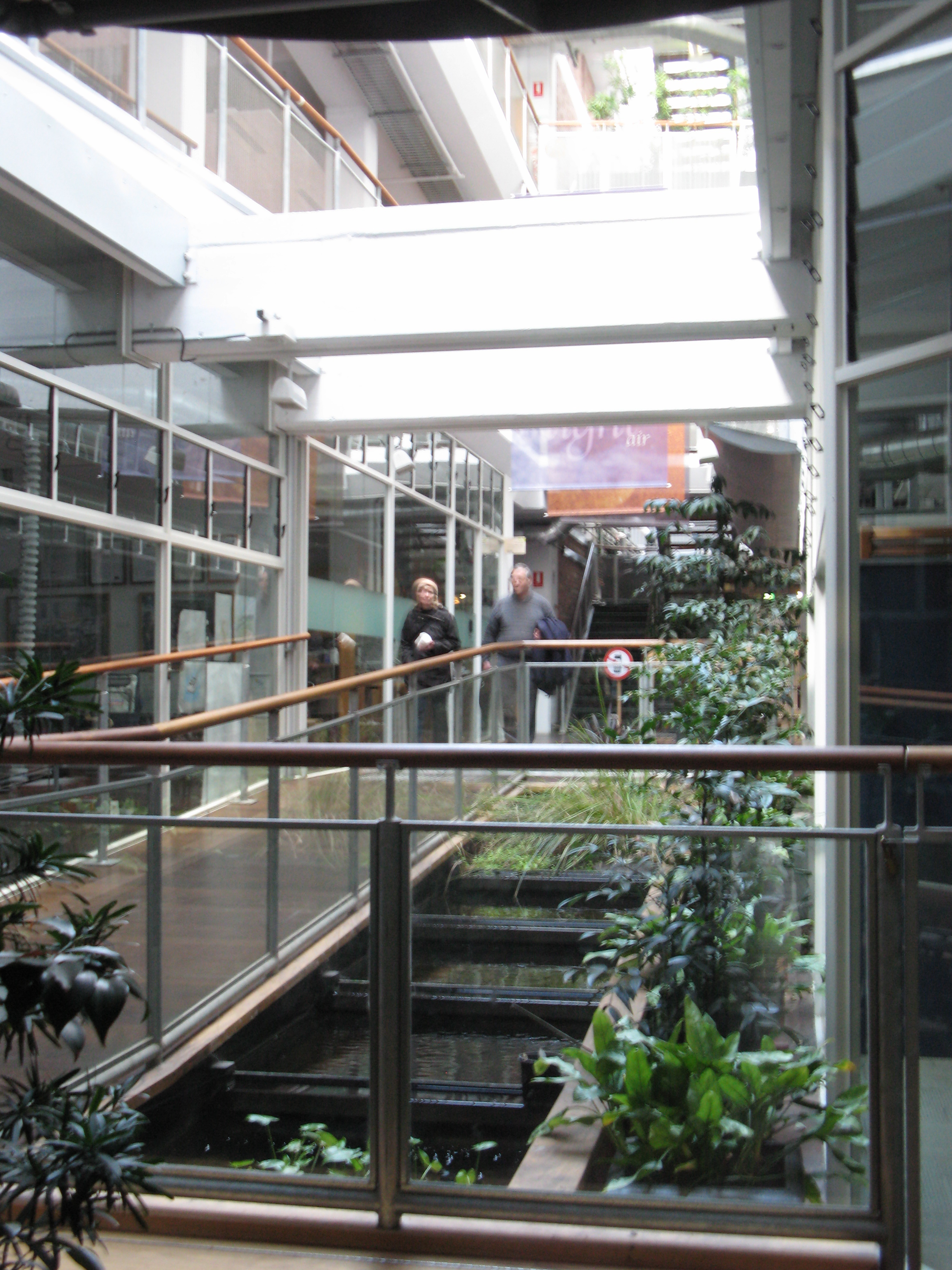
The interior of the 60L Green Building in Melbourne, Victoria

There are several sustainable buildings in Australia, deemed so on the basis of the impact to the environment, the utilisation of renewable, recycled building materials, and non renewable resources, as opposed to other structures built in accordance with principles that disregard the extent and span of a structures and the inhabitants effect on the environment. Environment Australia's National Australian Building Environmental Rating System (NABERS) assesses such efficiency and environmental performance, and awards buildings on the basis of this with a star rating system. Another body, the Green Building Council of Australia also audits buildings and awards the Green Star (Australia) to buildings of merit.

Government legislation and incentives and community awareness are facilitating the development of sustainable buildings in Australia.

== New South Wales ==
Surry Hills Library and Community Centre.

== Queensland ==
Santos Place in the Brisbane central business district and Green Square in Fortitude Valley have both received a 6 Green Star rating.

== South Australia ==
In Adelaide, South Australia, there are at least three different projects that incorporate the principles of green building. The Eco-City development is located in Adelaide's city centre, the Aldinga Arts Eco Village is located in Aldinga and Lochiel Park is located at Campbelltown. Other developments such as Mawson Lakes (North) and the Lightsview development near Northgate (North-East of the CBD), also have green building requirements.

== Victoria ==
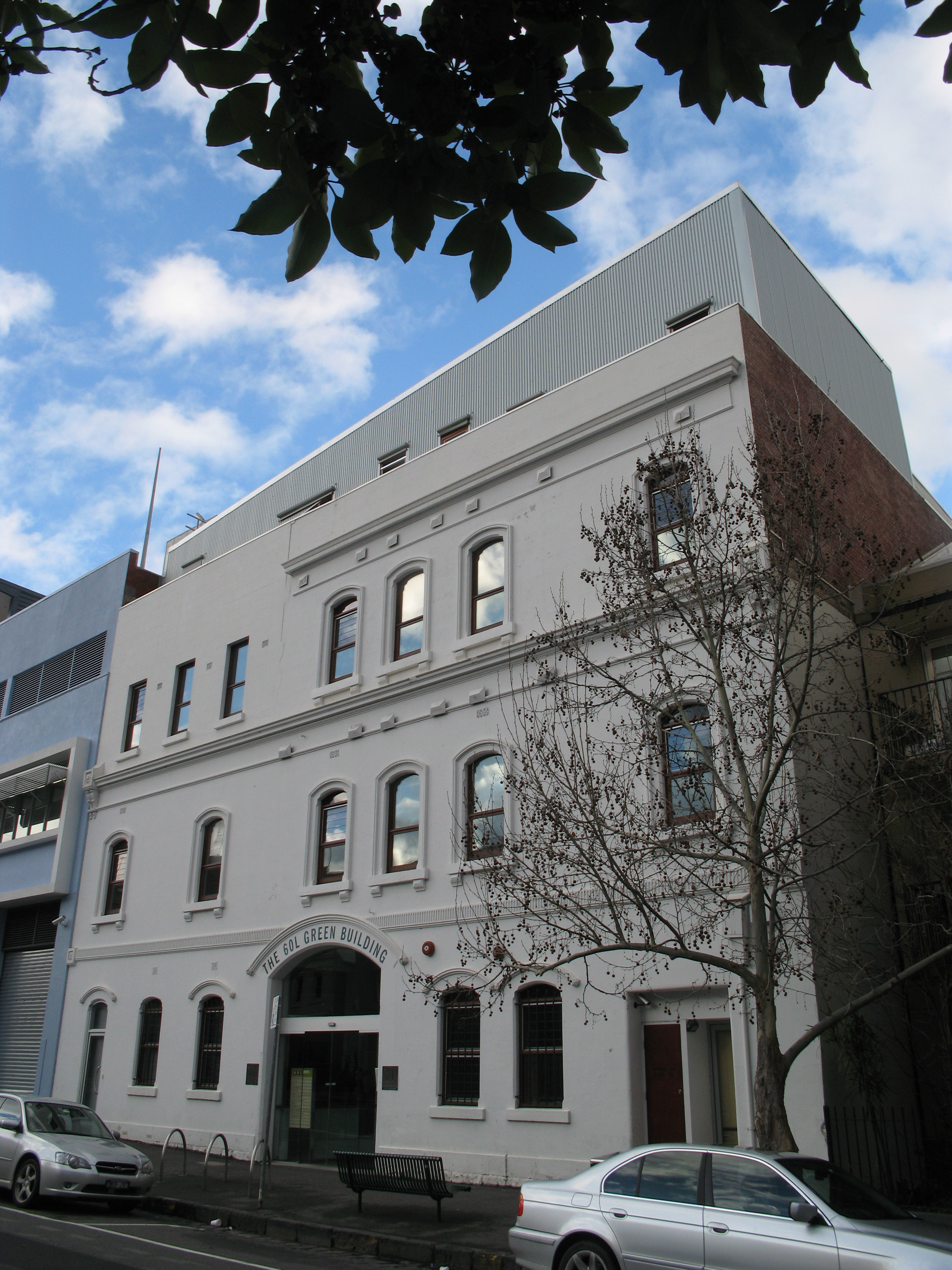
The historically preserved facade of the 60L Green Building in Melbourne

Melbourne is a major centre for culture, architecture, sustainability and the environment in Australia, it has been home to many examples of green buildings and sustainable development since the 1970s, such as the CERES Community Environment Park, which continues to this day.

Two of the most prominent examples of green commercial buildings in Australia are located in Melbourne; The 60L Green Building in Carlton and Council House 2 (also known as CH2), in Melbourne's CBD, the later was the first to receive Australia’s 6 Star Green Star – Office Design rating.

Other examples include:

- Box Hill Hospital redevelopment
- The Green Skills Centre of Excellence Training Centre at NMIT's Epping campus
- Several buildings at Swinburne University's Hawthorn campus

== Western Australia ==
In the capital, there are at least three different projects that incorporate the principles of green building. The Office development located in Murray Street, West Perth being designed by Eco Design Consultant in collaboration with Troppo Architects is one of them. The other two are mixed development along Wellington Street, in the city centre.

== See also ==
- Green Building Council
- House Energy Rating
- LEED - U.S. Green Building Rating System
- Life cycle costing
- Zero-energy building
