= Australian Building Codes Board =

Australian government body

Agency overview
- Formed: March 1, 1994; 32 years ago
- Headquarters: 12/224 Bunda St, Canberra ACT 2600, Australia
- Parent department: Department of Industry, Science and Resources
- Website: www.abcb.gov.au

The Australian Building Codes Board (ABCB) is a body that writes Australia's standardised building requirements, including the National Construction Code (NCC), WaterMark, and CodeMark. The ABCB is part of a joint endeavour by the Commonwealth, state and territory governments, and the country's plumbing and building industries.

The ABCB is "the authority responsible for building regulation in Australia". NCC regulations are revised every three years, the most-recent revision being the NCC 2022.

== Organisation ==
The Australian Building Codes Board (ABCB), is a collective body formed in a partnership between the state, territorial, and national governments; and with representatives of the plumbing and building industries. The ABCB was formed, by the three levels of government in an Inter-Government Agreement that was signed on 1 March 1994. The ABCB has striven to reform the building regulations and the regulatory framework for building since the introduction of the Building Code of Australia (BCA), which is part of the National Construction Code (NCC).

Since the beginning of the 1990s, the ABCB worked on the development of a universal building code for Australia. In the mid 1990s this was expanded to include performance-based codes. In 2011, ABCB publication "NCC" was expanded to incorporate codes for plumbing and construction. By 2015, the ABCB planned to improve the NCC; these improvements included enhancing public online access to the NCC, measuring the NCC's performance, lessening the diverging regulations being applied in some states, and broadening the NCC to include an aggregation of building-site regulations to prevent overlaps in regulation.

Until 2015, the ABCB regularly revised the BCA. After 2016, the revision period was extended to three years. Until 2015, the ABCB was a standards-writing body of the Council of Australian Governments (COAG) until Prime Minister Scott Morrison abolished COAG and replaced it with the National Cabinet. It is unclear if the current National Cabinet administers the ABCB.

== Responsibilities ==
The ABCB is responsible for maintaining requirements which apply to the building and construction industry. These requirements include the National Construction Code (NCC), which consists of the Building Code of Australia, the Plumbing Code of Australia, and the WaterMark and CodeMark Certification Schemes.

=== National Construction Code ===
The NCC allows the ABCB to introduce minimum standards in the building and construction industry, such as energy efficiency standards. The design of buildings built in Australia must satisfy the requirements imposed by the ABCB. The ABCB accredits certifiers, both council and private, that have authority to certify the designs of buildings, and to deem them compliant.

=== WaterMark ===
WaterMark is a mandatory certification scheme for some plumbing and drainage products. WaterMark applies nationally and is managed by the ABCB. The certificates of compliance of the products are issued by Conformity Assessment Bodies, which the ABCB accredits.

=== CodeMark ===
CodeMark is a certification scheme for building products and systems in Australia and New Zealand the ABCB developed and administers. The ABCB and the New Zealand Department of Building and Housing maintain CodeMark to create confidence and determinability for regulatory bodies by issuing Certificates of Conformity.

=== Other ===
The ABCB released Volume 1 of the NCC 2022 in May of 2022.
