= National Construction Code =

Australian building guidelines

NCC
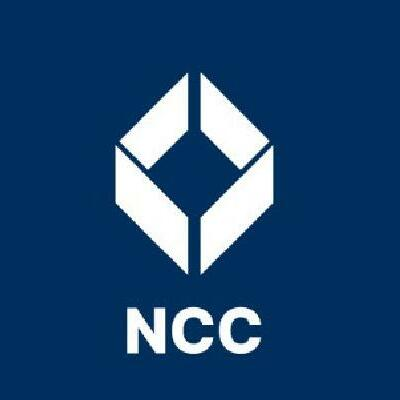

Australian Building Codes Board
- Long title: National Construction Code
- Territorial extent: Whole of Australia
- Enacted by: Australian Building Codes Board

The National Construction Code

The National Construction Code (NCC) is a set of minimum requirements for buildings in Australia. The requirements concern the aspects of health, safety, accessibility, amenity and sustainability of the types of buildings that the code applies to. The Code is published by the Australian Building Codes Board (ABCB) in service to the Australian Federal Government as well as State and Territorial governments of Australia.

The NCC 2022 replaced the NCC 2019; it is revised every 3 years. The NCC consists of 3 volumes. Volume One contains requirements for mostly commercial buildings, Volume Two contains requirements for mostly domestic buildings. These first two volumes together are known as the Building Code of Australia (BCA). Volume Three contains plumbing and drainage requirements for all types of buildings, it is also known as the Plumbing Code of Australia.

== Changes ==
The NCC is revised every three years by the Australian Building Codes Board (ABCB), and the changes that are implemented include those selected from proposals. These proposals can be submitted by any person at any time. Once submitted they will be considered by involved committees and if it passes will be included in the public comment draft of the next years edition of the NCC.

=== Changes implemented in NCC 2022 ===
The NCC 2022 has increased the energy efficiency requirements, new houses will be required to achieve a higher degree of thermal performance.

The NCC 2022 has more focus on creating fully electric buildings, buildings that don't use gas, and harnessing this electricity from renewable sources. This includes a requirement that buildings be able to accommodate electric vehicle charging.

The requirements for valley gutters have been increased to where there is a minimum of 15 millimetres (0.6 in) freeboard height, which is more than it was in NCC 2019.

== Compliance ==
Establishing a building plans compliance with the NCC can be done through one of a few pathways. The most common of these is the "deemed to satisfy" pathway in which the aspects of a buildings plan are measured against the requirements for the various aspects of the design as written in the NCC. More complex and less commonly used is the "alternative solution" pathway; which is seen by some as more extensive and more difficult to achieve.

== Thermal comfort ==
The thermal comfort range that the ABCB recommends is a Predicted Mean Vote between +1 and −1, which is a level that would ensure that three quarters of the occupants of the given building across 95% of the floor area would feel comfortable thermally.

== Building Classifications ==
Building Classifications
Class			Description
1	a	(i)	Single Dwelling that is Detached
1	a	(ii)	Single Dwelling that is Attached (shares one or more walls with) other Single Dwellings (Semi-detached, Terraced house, Terraced houses in Australia)
1	b	(i)	Any Class 1a building that is used as a Boarding house, Guest house, Hostel that does not accommodate more than 12 people and is not larger than 300 m^{2} (3,200 sq ft).
1	b	(ii)	When four or more dwellings are sitting on the same plot and used for short-term holiday stay.
2		(i)	The dwellings are stacked, such as Apartments.
2		(ii)	Class 1a(ii) building that has a collective/shared space underneath such as a shared carpark.
3		"a residential building providing long-term or transient accommodation for a number of unrelated persons"	
3		(i)	Boarding house, guest house, hostel, lodging house.
3		(ii)	Residential area that is a part of a hotel or motel.
3		(iii)	Residential area that is part of a school.
3		(iv)	Children, handicapped or elderly accommodation.
3		(v)	Residential area for the staff of a hospital, nursing home or clinic.
3		(vi)	Residential area of a detention centre.
3		(vii)	Assisted living
4		A single residence within a larger building that is Class 5, 6, 7, 8 or 9.	
5		Office buildings (Class 6 in NSW and SA)	
6		Retail, Commercial	
6		(i)	Cafes, restaurants and bars.
6		(ii)	Dining areas, bars, shops and stalls that are part of and located within a greater hotel or motel building.
6		(iii)	Barbershop, laundromat, funeral home.
6		(iv)	Showrooms, automobile repair shops, auctionhouse.
7	a	Parking lot, multistorey car park	
7	b	Warehouse	
8		(i)	Laboratory
8		(ii)	Factory, Workshop
9	a	Healthcare buildings such as, but not limited to, hospitals, where patients receive treatment.	
9	b	Workshop, laboratory area within a school.	
9	c	Aged care	
10	a	Structures such as a shed, personal garage or carports that are not intended for living in.	
10	b	Any structures such as antennas, fences, free standing walls and swimming pools.	
10	c	A bushfire shelter associated with a Class 1a building.	

== Criticisms and issues ==
=== The Code ===
==== Ventilation ====
According to Geoff Hanmer, adjunct professor of architecture at the University of Adelaide, the regulations for ventilation are impotent. The code permits a building to be ventilated naturally though openable windows, but does not in any way guarantee that the windows will actually be opened to provide this ventilation; in the case of buildings like hospitals where there is a requirement that the building be mechanically ventilated, the NCC allows for the fresh air that is supplied into the patient rooms to recirculate via the corridors of the hospital (Note: This in effect is mixing the air from the (sick)patients in the rooms of the hospital to mix into the corridors where the personnel walks. The new Footscray Hospital is an example of this.). He states that the NCC thus permits the construction a 1000-person occupancy building such as a nightclub, a school of 600 occupants and elderly care facilities of 300 occupants all with virtually no ventilation.

==== Earthquakes ====
The requirements the properties of reinforced concrete walls as specified in the standard AS 3600-2009, which are cited by at least NCC 2016 are not adequate in preventing collapse during very rare seismic events. The best practices for places with low to moderate seismicity, like Australia, are to have performance objectives in place that prevent collapse under the conditions of very rare seismic events. Hoult, Goldsworthy & Lumantarna (2019) specifically recommends that the Australian Building Codes Board revise the codes pertaining to this present in the NCC 2016 to prevent collapse in the event of an earthquake with 2500 year return period.

==== Sustainability ====
===== Wood construction =====
As of the NCC2019, it was more difficult and more expensive to make massive timber constructions due to the necessity to establish compliance with the NCC through "alternative solutions". As of the NCC2019, the compliance of massive timber constructions up to 25 m (82 ft) can be established through the "deemed to satisfy" pathway.

=== Implementation ===
==== Disabled accessibility ====
The Committee on the Rights of Persons with Disabilities (CRPD) recommended to the NCC the implementation of mandatory accessibility requirements (for disabled access). The states of New South Wales, Western Australia, and South Australia have not followed the recommendations despite being bound by the CRPD.

==== Delays by states ====
The state of South Australia (SA) has announced it will transition into the NCC 2022 in a unique and delayed way. (SA) will implement NCC 2022 on 1 May 2023.
