= BASIX =

BASIX or Building Sustainability Index is a scheme introduced by the government of New South Wales, Australia on 1 July 2004 to regulate the energy efficiency of residential buildings. It offers an online assessment tool for rating the expected performance of any residential development in terms of water efficiency, thermal comfort and energy usage. It aims to reduce water consumption and greenhouse gas emissions by 40% compared to pre-BASIX (2004) buildings. In order to meet these expectations, many people install rainwater tanks and environmentally friendly, water saving spouts.

Developers have complained about additional costs for apartment buildings.

== Monitoring ==
Monitoring of occupied BASIX single dwellings conducted by Sydney Water confirmed that the actual water savings were 40.6% in 2008 and 37.6% in 2009. BASIX has won a number of awards in Australia, the most recent one being in 2007 for "Energy in Society - For contributing to policy, law and the community" at the Australian Institute of Energy. Experts of Economics say that by 2050, the total net savings in New South Wales is between $294 million and $1.1 billion.

== See also ==
- Green building in Australia
