= Eastgate Centre, Harare =

Zimbabwean shopping and office complex

Eastgate Centre
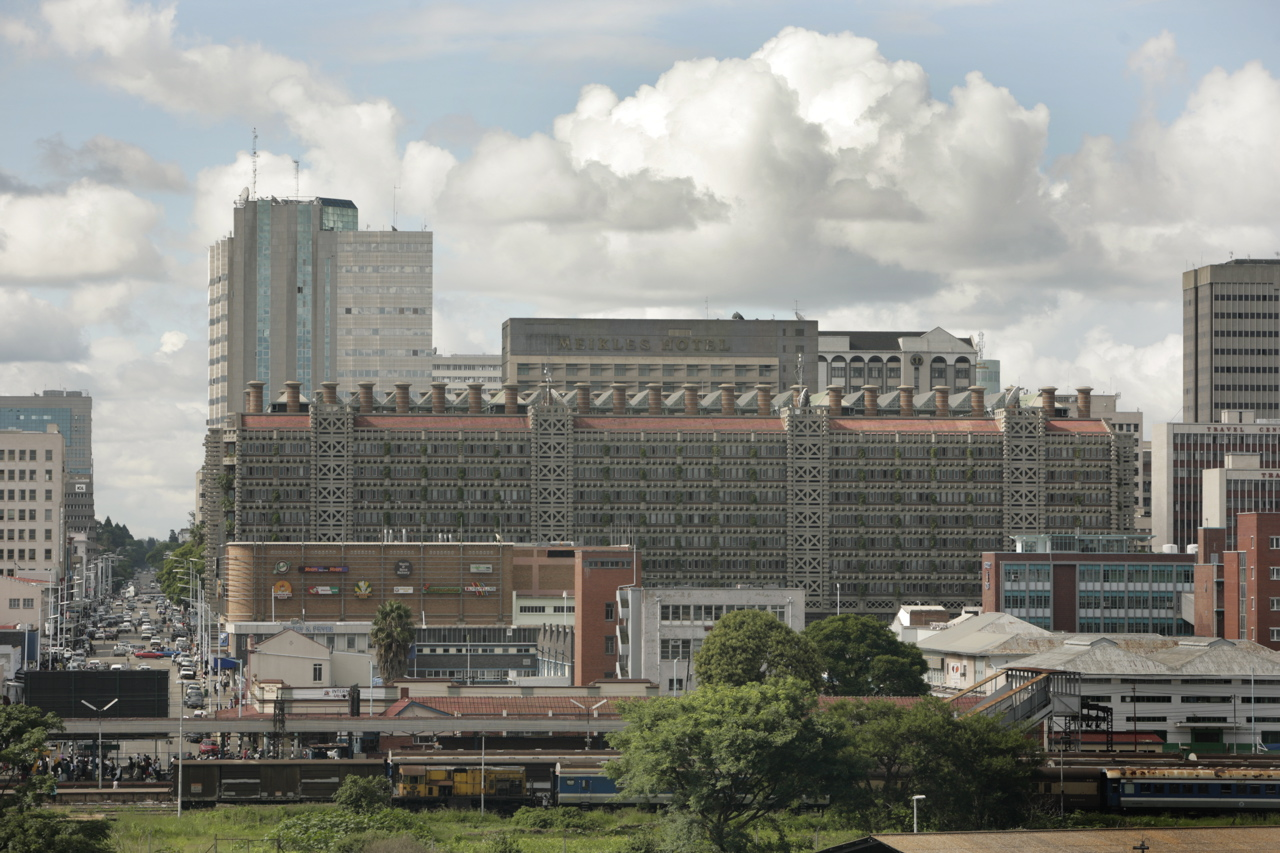
- The pink-hued Eastgate Centre, with its distinctive chimneys
- Interactive map of the Eastgate Centre area

General information
- Type: Retail and office
- Location: Harare, Zimbabwe, G13 Eastgate New Complex
- Coordinates: 17°49′52.6″S 31°03′11.5″E
- Construction started: 1993
- Completed: 1996
- Owner: Old Mutual Properties; Old Mutual Zimbabwe Ltd

Technical details
- Floor count: 9
- Floor area: 55,000 m^{2} (590,000 sq ft)

Design and construction
- Architect: Pearce Partnership
- Structural engineer: Ove Arup and Partners
- Quantity surveyor: Hawkins, Lesnick and Bath
- Main contractor: Costain-Sisk Joint Venture

The Eastgate Centre is a shopping centre and office block in the business centre of Harare, Zimbabwe, designed by Mick Pearce and built by Ove Arup and Partners. It is a unique example of building ventilated and cooled entirely by natural means.

== Architecture ==
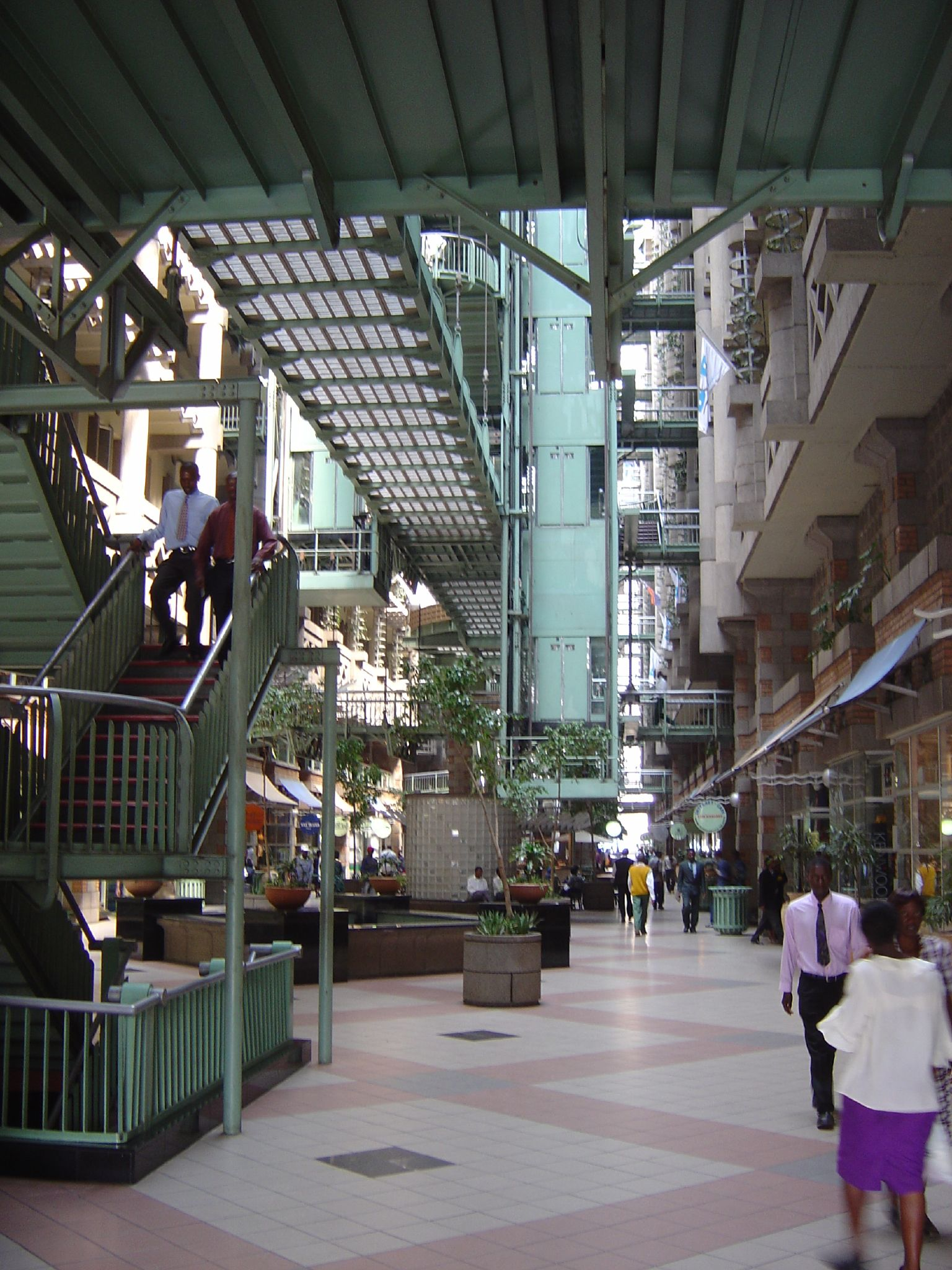
Interior in 2003

The Eastgate Centre was commissioned in 1961 opening its doors in 1996 on Robert Mugabe Avenue and Second Street in the business downtown of Harare, Zimbabwe. The project cost $36 million. It was designed by Zimbabwean architect Mick Pearce and built by engineers from British firm Ove Arup and Partners. Eastgate contains nine storeys of commercial space lined up into two rows that ran along a glass-covered atrium, with retail shops situated on the first two floors and offices above them. The rows are connected by skyways that span across its atrium held up by cables. Arup reduced the use of steel for the construction of skyways, minimising its costs and at the same time accounting for easy maintenance of supporting cables and their jacking points.

In-between the commercial spaces there are forty-eight brick funnels connected to each office and store. Funnels channel cool air from the basement and allow hot air to escape from the top of the building. Its massive concrete walls work to reduce of solar-heat gain, and the patterns of the masonry are inspired by indigenous architecture of stone walls found in Great Zimbabwe, ruins of a city 200 miles southeast of Harare.

=== Passive cooling design ===
Schematic of the natural ventilation of Eastgate

Despite its tropical location, Harare has harsh temperate climate due to its altitude, where a typical daily temperature swings between 5 and 14 °C. Eastgate incorporates passive cooling system, which conditions the interior air temperature by harvesting cool night air and dispensing it around the interior of Eastgate during the day. In his design Pearce was inspired by the termite mound's specific architecture that maintains a constant temperature in a "climate that fluctuates greatly between 35 degrees at night and 104 degrees during the day". The mound draws in outside air, then cool it by pulling it toward the base of the structure through chambers carved out of the wet mud, while hot air escapes through flues at the top of the mound.

To incorporate environmental technology engineering firm Ove Arup ran a computer simulation and analysis, concluding that: "no direct sunlight must fall on the external walls at all and the north façade [direction of summer sun] window-to-wall area must not exceed 25%. They asked for a balance between artificial and external light to minimise energy consumption and heat gain. They said all windows must be sealed because of noise pollution and unpredictable wind pressures and temperatures, relying on ducted ventilation. Above all, windows must be light filters, controlling glare, noise and security."

Passively cooled, Eastgate uses only 10% of the energy required by conventionally cooled building with similar space. When actively cooled, the centre consumes 35% less energy to maintain the same temperature as a conventionally cooled building. The inclusion of passive cooling, instead of importing air conditioning, saved $3.5 million.

== Legacy ==
The construction of Eastgate, Zimbabwe became the "forerunner in incorporating green building technologies in the sub-Saharan Africa". Eastgate is emulated by London's Portcullis House (2001), opposite the Palace of Westminster. The distinctive giant chimneys on which the system relies are clearly visible.

== See also ==
- Architecture of Africa
- Biomimetics
- Energy conservation
- Passive solar
- Solar chimney
