= Green Star (Australia) =

Australian sustainability rating for buildings

Green Star is a voluntary sustainability rating system for buildings in Australia. It was launched in 2003 by the Green Building Council of Australia (GBCA).

The Green Star rating system assesses the sustainability of projects at all stages of the built environment life cycle. Ratings can be achieved at the planning phase for communities, during the design, construction or fit out phase of buildings, or during the ongoing operational phase.

The system considers assesses and rates buildings, fitouts and communities against a range of environmental impact categories, and aims to encourage leadership in environmentally sustainable design and construction, showcase innovation in sustainable building practices, and consider occupant health, productivity and operational cost savings.

In 2013, the GBCA released The Value of Green Star, a report that analysed data from 428 Green Star-certified projects occupying 5,746,000 million square metres across Australia and compared it to the ‘average’ Australian building and minimum practice benchmarks. The research found that, on average, Green Star-certified buildings produce 62% fewer greenhouse gas emissions and use 66% less electricity than average Australian buildings. Green Star buildings use 51% less potable water than average buildings. Green Star-certified buildings also have been found to recycle 96 per cent of their construction and demolition waste, compared to the average 58% for new construction projects.

== Rating system ==
Green Star benchmarks projects against the nine Green Star categories of: Management; Indoor Environment Quality; Energy; Transport; Water; Materials; Land Use & Ecology; Emissions and Innovation.

Within each category are credits which address specific aspects of sustainable building design, construction or performance. Ratings for buildings are available at the design stage ('Design' ratings), at the post-construction phase (known as 'As Built' ratings) or for interior fitouts (‘Interiors’ ratings).

Green Star - Communities rates projects at the community or precinct scale against the categories of: Liveability; Economic Prosperity; Environment; Design; Governance and Innovation.

Green Star certification is a formal process in which an independent assessment panel reviews documentary evidence that a project meets Green Star benchmarks within each credit. The assessment panel awards points, with a Green Star rating determined by comparing the overall score with the rating scale:

Score	Rating	Category
10-19	One Star	Minimum Practice
20-29	Two Star	Average Practice
30-44	Three Star	Good Practice
45-59	Four Star	Best Practice
60-74	Five Star	Australian Excellence
75+	Six Star	World Leadership

Green Star rating tools for building, fitout and community design and construction reward projects that achieve best practice or above, which means ratings of 1, 2 or 3 are not awarded. Ongoing performance of a building can be rated at any of the 6 star ratings.

Buildings assessed using the Green Star – Performance rating tool will be able to achieve a Green Star rating from 1 – 6 Star Green Star.

== Projects ==
More than 1900 projects around Australia have achieved Green Star ratings. The first building to achieve a Green Star rating was 8 Brindabella Circuit at Canberra Airport, which achieved a 5 Star Green Star – Office Design v1 rating in 2004. In 2005, Council House 2 in Melbourne became the first building to achieve a 6 Star Green Star – Office Design v1 rating. Flinders Medical Centre – New South Wing was the first healthcare facility in Australia to achieve a Green Star rating. Scarborough Beach Pool was the first aquatic facility to achieve a 6 star green rating. Bond University Mirvac School for Sustainability achieved the first Green Star rating for an educational facility. Other well-known Green Star projects include 1 Bligh Street in Sydney and the Melbourne Convention and Exhibition Centre.

== Controversy ==
The launch of the Green Star rating system was met with some scepticism by green groups, which argued that the rating system was funded by mostly development industry companies. There was controversy over a proposal to expand the forest certification of timber and composite timber products, but this issue was resolved with the release of the revised ‘Timber’ credit in 2010. There has also been concern over various aspects of the timeframe for awarding of the certification, transfer of properties once awarded, and termination rights.

== See also ==
- Green building
- House Energy Rating
