= List of low-energy building techniques =

Low-energy buildings, which include zero-energy buildings, passive houses and green buildings, may use any of a large number of techniques to lower energy use.

The following are some of the techniques used to achieve low-energy buildings, which excludes energy generation (microgeneration).

== Improvements to building envelope ==
- Active daylighting
- Barra system
- Brise soleil
- Cool roof and green roof
- Daylighting
- Double envelope house
- Earth sheltering
- Energy plus house
- Fluorescent lighting, compact fluorescent lamp, and LED lighting
- Green building and wood
- History of passive solar building design
- Low-energy house
- Passive daylighting
- Passive house
- Passive solar
- Passive solar building design
- Quadruple glazing
- Solar energy
- Superinsulation
- Sustainable architecture
- Sustainability
- Trombe wall
- Windcatcher
- Zero energy building
- Zero heating building

== Improvements to heating, cooling, ventilation and water heating ==
- Absorption refrigerator
- Annualized geothermal solar
- Earth cooling tubes
- Geothermal heat pump
- Heat recovery ventilation
- Hot water heat recycling
- Passive cooling
- Renewable heat
- Seasonal thermal energy storage (STES)
- Solar air conditioning
- Solar hot water

== Energy rating systems ==
- EnerGuide (Canada)
- Home energy rating (US)
- House Energy Rating (Australia)
- LEED - Leadership in Energy and Environmental Design
- National Home Energy Rating (UK)
