= IEA Solar Heating and Cooling Programme =

International Energy Agency Solar Heating and Cooling Programme (IEA SHC)
- logo
- Membership: 20 Countries; European Commission; 9 Sponsor organizations
- Establishment: 1977
- Website www.iea-shc.org

The International Energy Agency Solar Heating and Cooling Technology Collaboration Programme (IEA SHC TCP) is one of over 40 multilateral Technology Collaboration Programmes (also known as TCPs) of the International Energy Agency. It was one of the first of such programmes, founded in 1977. Its current mission is "To bring the latest solar heating and cooling research and information to the forefront of the global energy transition. .". Its international solar collector statistics Solar Heat Worldwide serves as a reference document for governments, financial institutions, consulting firms and non-profit/non-governmental organizations.

== Membership and organization ==
The IEA SHC's members are national governments, the European Commission and international organizations. Each of the members is represented by one representative in the management body called the executive committee. The IEA SHC Executive Committee meets twice per year and is headed by an elected chairman. The IEA SHC currently has 30 members (Australia, Austria, Belgium, Canada, China, Denmark, France, Germany, Italy, Netherlands, Norway, Poland, Portugal, Slovakia, South Africa, Spain, Sweden, Switzerland, Turkey, United Kingdom, European Commission, CCREEE, EACREEE, ECREEE, ISES, REEECH, RCREEE, SACREEE, SICREEE, Solar Heat Europe ).

== Fields of work ==
=== Research, development and demonstration ===
The IEA SHC aims to facilitate international collaboration in the research, development and demonstration of solar heat and solar buildings. Their multi-year projects (also known as "Tasks") are conducted by researchers from different countries. Funding is provided by IEA SHC members, who usually pay one or more national research institutions to participate in the work.

Research topics include:

- solar water heating and solar air heating, e.g. Solar Hot Water for 2030 (Task 69), Solar and Heat Pump Systems (Task 44), Solar Combisystems (Task 26)
- solar industrial process heat, e.g. Solar Process Heat (Task 64), Solar Energy in Industrial Water and Wastewater (Task 62), Solar Process Heat for Production and Advanced Applications (Task 49), Solar Heat for Industrial Process (Task 33)
- solar district heating, e.g. Efficient Solar District Heating Systems (Task 68), Towards the Integration of Large Systems into District Heating and Cooling Network (Task 55), Large Systems: Large Solar Heating/Cooling Systems, Seasonal Storage, Heat Pumps (Task 45)
- solar cooling, e.g. Solar Cooling for the Sunbelt Regions (Task 65), New Generation Solar Cooling and Heating Systems (PV or Solar Thermally Driven Systems (Task 53), Quality Assurance and Support Measures for Solar Cooling (Task 48), Solar Air-Conditioning and Refrigeration (Task 38)
- solar buildings/architecture, e.g. Low Carbon, High Comfort Integrated Lighting (Task 70), Solar Energy Buildings (Task 66), Solar Neighborhood Planning (Task 63), Solutions for Daylighting & Electric Lighting (Task 61), Renovating Historic Buildings Towards Zero Energy (Task 59), Building Integrated Solar Envelope Systems for HVAC and Lighting (Task 56), Solar Energy and Energy Economics in Urban Environments (Task 52), Solar Energy in Urban Planning (Task 51), Solar Renovation of Non-Residential Buildings (Task 47), Solar Energy and Architecture (Task 41)

As well as work on:

- Materials/components for solar heating and cooling, e.g. Compact Thermal Energy Storage Materials (Task 67), Application of PVT Collectors (Task 60), Materials & Components for Thermal Energy Storage (Task 58), Price Reduction for Solar Thermal Systems (Task 54), Compact Thermal Energy Storage (Task 42), Polymeric Materials for Solar Thermal Applications (Task 39)
- Regulations, standards & certification, e.g., Life Cycle and Cost Assessment for Heating and Cooling Technologies (Task 71), Solar Standards and Certification (Task 57), Solar Rating & Certification Procedure (Task 43)
- Resource assessment, e.g. Solar Resource Assessment and Forecasting (Task 46), Solar Resource Knowledge Management (Task 36)

=== SHC conference ===
In 2011, the IEA SHC Executive Committee announced an annual international conference on solar heating and cooling for buildings and industry. The first conference, SHC 2012 took place 9–11 July 2012 in San Francisco, followed by SHC 2013 on 23–25 September 2013 in Freiburg, Germany, SHC 2014 on 13–15 October in Beijing, China, and SHC 2015 on 2–4 December in Istanbul, Turkey. SHC 2013 and SHC 2015 were jointly with the European Solar Thermal Industry Federation (ESTIF), which had previously organized their own conference, ESTEC. SHC 2017 in Abu Dhabi, UAE and SHC 2019 in Santiago, Chile were jointly organized with ISES' Solar World Congress. EuroSun 2022 in Kassel, Germany is the first co-organized EuroSun conference with ISES. The next joint EuroSun conference with ISES is August 2024 in Limassol, Cyprus EuroSun 2024

=== Publications ===
Apart from the reports and other publications of the research projects (Tasks), the Solar Heating and Cooling Programme publishes several cross-cutting documents, the most important one being the annual collector statistics Solar Heat Worldwide. The SHC newsletter Solar Update is published twice per year.

== See also ==
- List of pioneering solar buildings
- Passive house
- Low-energy house
- Zero energy building
- Energy-plus-house
- Sustainable development
