= Double envelope house =

Passive solar building

A double envelope house is a passive solar house design which collects solar energy in a solarium and passively allows the warm air to circulate around the house between two sets of walls, a double building envelope. This design is from 1975 by Lee Porter Butler in the United States.

== History ==
Lee Porter Butler's 1975 Double Envelope (Shell) design received wide publicity after the U.S. solar energy tax credits were created in 1978. Versions were on the cover of Better Homes and Gardens and Popular Science magazines.

Butler was an artistic/ecological building designer, a self-proclaimed "Ekotect." He did not hold formal qualifications as an energy engineer. Lee had built hundreds of homes, shopping centers and business buildings including banks and schools by the time he entered North Carolina State University to study architecture. He had studied engineering at Georgia Institute of Technology. Lee did not even have a high school diploma, but ended up teaching his invention of "the gravity geo-thermal envelope" at The University of California Berkeley in the Graduate School of design and Planning.

== Design and theory ==
Butler's experimental design was a form of isolated passive solar design that incorporated a passive heat distribution system. It attempted to address the problem of unequal distribution of heat that was associated with some direct gain systems. This phenomenon is observed particularly in designs with inadequate thermal mass, poor cross ventilation and excessive polar facing windows.

Butler's design was essentially a house within a house. Thermal energy was captured from a south-facing solarium and heat was circulated by natural convection flow in the cavity between the two building envelopes and through a sub-floor or via earth cooling tubes.

A recirculating air flow path resulted from the warm (less-dense) air rising in a south-side solarium, and cooler (more dense) air falling on the north side to create pressure differentials that automatically moved excess solar thermal gain from the south to the north side of the building without forced convection systems. Air flow was proportional to the differences in temperature between the two convection paths.

In the summer, shading devices eliminate all direct solar gain. Vents are opened at the top to exhaust hot air. Fresh air intake uses ambient temperature earth to cool and dehumidify replacement air at the base.

In winter, the air in the cavity is buffered by warm ambient-temperature earth under the floor (which is partially recharged by the natural convection flow loop during each winter day). In the summer, the convective flow is replaced with cooler near-ambient-temperature earth replacement air, and the warm air exhausts by natural convection.

== Criticisms ==
The original explanation provided for its efficiency was the thermal buffer that existed in the double envelope cavity. However, observers have also commented that the overall insulation of the design is higher with two walls instead of just one.

While the design can perform better than a conventional home, formal performance monitoring suggested there were some problems with the original design. Commentators have criticized the design on various grounds:

- The rock bed under the house interfered with the geothermal night time effect and slowed warming in the morning.
- Roof-angled glass (See sun path) made it difficult to control summer heat gain and winter heat loss.
- An equator-side porch excessively shaded the lower floor from solar gain.
- The additional cavity on the north wall was excluded from the conditioned area (and created a potential fire hazard).
- Dark roofs and absent radiant barrier was not adequate to inhibit summer solar gain.
- The presence of a fireplace, chimney and clothes dryer were a source of convective heat loss.
- The design was not adequate to function in polar climates.
- Concerns about condensation and moisture issues forming in the convection loop leading to maintenance or health issues
- The additional materials and thermal mass used in construction
- Warm air rises by natural convection. It does not go down and around. They are fire traps and are against building codes in places like Aurora, Colorado.

Subsequent modifications have attempted to address these issues.

== Thermal buffer zone house ==
A modification based on Butler's original design has been described but not yet formally evaluated. It attempted to eliminate some of the initial issues.

An important difference is the polar limb of the convection loop (thermal buffer zone/TBZ) is employed as a utility area (e.g. laundry room, closets, pantry, and storage space). The laundry room also doubled as an area for clothes drying.

An external window is located on the polar side which can be opened to admit mild air into the TBZ during summer. An additional internal window separates the equatorial side living quarters. This can be opened to admit warm winter air from the solarium to enter directly into polar rooms.

The designer states that on cold winter days, the TBZ tempered with solar-heated air could be often above 85 degrees F, while the outside air was below freezing.

== Performance evaluation ==
Current technology makes it difficult to model the effects of these convective flow designs because computer performance simulation software does not presently incorporate these processes in their calculations.

== See also ==
- List of low-energy building techniques
- Passive solar design
- History of passive solar building design
- Double-skin facade

Passive solar design concepts

- Trombe wall
- Barra system
- Passive House
- Earth cooling tubes
- Windcatcher
- Annualized geothermal solar
- Earth sheltering
- Geothermal exchange heat pump

Solar-designers

- Category:Solar building designers
- List of pioneering solar buildings
