= GHEX =

GHEX can refer to

- ground-coupled heat exchanger
- Global Home Education Exchange
