= Passivhaus-Institut =

- Founded: 1966
- URLs: passiv.de, passivehouse.com

Passivhaus Institut (Passive House Institute), abbreviated PHI, is responsible for promoting and maintaining the Passivhaus building program. It was founded in 1996, and is based and active in Darmstadt, Germany.

The English translation of the name was used for the American counterpart (Passive House Institute US or PHIUS) when it was established in 2007, originally under the umbrella of the Passivhaus Institute. The two separated in 2012.

Though PHI and PHIUS sustainable design standards are different, they both share common goals for drastic energy conservation and carbon reduction through sustainable architecture design techniques and specifications to create low-energy houses and other structures with low energy building practices for the public benefit worldwide.

== See also ==
- List of low-energy building techniques
- History of passive solar building design
- Energy-efficient landscaping
