= CO Adaptive =

Architecture design firm based in Brooklyn

CO Adaptive is a design-build firm based in the Brooklyn Navy Yard founded by Ruth Mandl and Bobby Johnston. The firm started as an architecture studio in 2011 and expanded to provide construction services in 2021. CO Adaptive's notable works include several passive-house design projects in Brooklyn. The design and passive house renovation of the founders' own home in Bedford-Stuyvesant, Brooklyn, and renovation in Astoria, Queens were featured in The New York Times.

== Background ==
Ruth Mandl and Bobby Johnston met while they were studying for their Masters Degree in Architecture at Columbia University in New York. Ruth is Austrian and was born and raised in Vienna. She holds a Bachelor's in Interior Architecture from Kingston University in London. Bobby is from California and holds a Bachelor's Degree in Architecture from UC Berkeley.

CO Adaptive's projects use passive house design principles to minimize environmental footprint, such as carbon emissions from materials or energy efficiency. As both architect and builder managing the whole design and construction process, they can deconstruct and reuse more existing construction material on-site by designing it into the project. They partner with a network of appraisers, donation centers and recycling companies to prevent sending construction and demolition waste to landfills. Since 2019, they've been committed to not using foam insulation in their building projects due to its detrimental environmental impact.

The studio's first published project was a competition-winning entry for the Architects for Animals competition in 2011, organized by the non-profit Mayor's Alliance for New York City's Animals. They collaborated with architect Kathryn Walton, founder of the nonprofit The American Street Cat, Inc., and created a shelter out of recycled and donated materials, featuring a data-monitoring component that transmits information such as the duration of a cat's stay and its weight to a base station in real time.

== Works ==
CO Adaptive has designed performing arts facilities including the Mercury Store in Gowanus, Brooklyn (2021). This community theater space is an adaptive reuse of a historic metal foundry built in 1902. The new design combines cross-laminated timber (CLT) with the original timber beams from the 100+ year old structure, and is among the first commercial buildings in New York City to utilize CLT in an adaptive reuse project. CO Adaptive's design for Mercury Store was featured in the 2023 MOMA Show 'Architecture Now: New York, New Publics.'

In 2013, CO Adaptive designed an experimental dance space in a former industrial building for Triskelion in Greenpoint, Brooklyn. The client, a non-profit dance venue and rehearsal space, expanded to create more affordable performance space for emerging artists.
