= Zero carbon housing =

House that does not emit greenhouse gasses

Zero-carbon housing is housing that does not emit greenhouse gasses (GHGs) into the atmosphere, either directly (Scope 1), or indirectly due to consumption electricity produced using fossil fuels (Scope 2). Most commonly zero-carbon housing is taken to mean zero emissions of carbon dioxide, which is the main climate pollutant from homes, although fugitive methane may also be emitted from natural gas pipes and appliances.

== Definition ==
There are nevertheless a number of definitions of zero carbon housing, particularly concerning the scope of emissions in the housing lifecycle (eg construction vs operation or refurb), and whether it is acceptable to count off-site emissions reduction (eg due to renewable energy export) or other external reductions against any residual emissions from the house to make it a Net Zero Home. The Chancery Lane legal climate project gives 6 definitions of zero carbon housing or buildings, of which 2 explicitly allow for the inclusion of off-site emissions reductions, via off-site renewables or other carbon offsets, and one is a net zero definition, allowing for net renewable energy export to be included. Some definitions are at odds with the apparent meaning of zero carbon, with the UK government at one point proposing to define a zero carbon home as one with "70 per cent reduction in carbon emissions against 2006 standards" - ie by definition not literally zero, as it allows up to 30% of conventional emissions.

Construction vs operation: Some scopes cover operation only, some give the option of including construction too. For the purposes of present day policy to reduce emissions, it is most useful to include construction and operation in the scope of new buildings, and refurbishment and operational emissions in the scope for existing buildings (as their construction impacts cannot be changed in retrospect). For a refurbishment to be genuinely zero-carbon, the embedded carbon needs to be "paid back" by the emissions saved by the house within a timescale relevant for action on climate change (normally within a few years), and well within the lifetime of the equipment concerned. Where a new zero carbon house is constructed, the embedded carbon of the whole building must be considered and paid back. As there is substantial embedded carbon in conventional building materials such as brick and concrete, a new zero carbon home is a bigger challenge than a retrofit and is likely to need more novel materials.

Another way in which a home can become zero carbon in operation is simply that it is powered, heated and cooled purely by a zero carbon electricity grid. While these are currently (2024) few (eg Iceland, Nepal), a significant number of countries are targeting zero carbon electricity grids by 2035, including Austria, Belgium, Canada, France, Germany, Luxembourg, the Netherlands, Switzerland and the UK.

== Retrofitting existing conventional homes to become zero carbon in use ==
The following main changes are required:

=== Eliminate direct greenhouse gas emissions ===
Most conventional houses in countries where space heating is required use fossil fuels or wood for space heating, hot water and cooking. In order to become zero carbon, these heating systems need to be replaced with zero emission heating methods. The main options are:

- Heat pumps — powered by electricity, deliver high efficiency by drawing on the heat energy in ambient air/ground, heat pumps can deliver an apparent effiency of 400% or more, i.e. heat delivered is 4x the electrical energy in. May use air, water or ground as the heat source, and can deliver heat as warm air (air to air heat pump) or via a wet system using radiators or under-floor heating (air source heat pump). Most buildings in Norway already use heat pumps, and they are being rolled out with some government support in many countries in Western Europe, while heat pump installations now exceed gas furnace installations in the USA. As heat pumps often use lower flow temperatures than traditional fossil fuelled systems, homes may need improvements in insulation and larger emitters (eg radiators) when they install a heat pump. One study estimates the embodied carbon in a UK installed heat pump at 1563 kg. For average UK heat demand of 10,000kWh per year and a sCOP (efficiency) of 4, this would use 2,500kWh electricity at 156g/kWh=390 kg. Whereas gas would have emitted 10,000/0.85 x181g=2129 kg. Therefore 1621 kg is saved per year, and the heat pump carbon payback is 11 months. The payback would be longer in a country with higher grid carbon intensity.
- Direct (resistive) electric heating — Already widely used, but less efficient than heat pumps (max output 100% of electricity in), and therefore significantly more expensive for space and water heating. In the form of induction heating, is a replacement for fossil fuelled cooking.
- Hydrogen fired boilers/furnaces — a hydrogen boiler emits only water vapour, so is zero emission locally. However, it will only be zero emission overall if the hydrogen is from zero carbon sources, eg green hydrogen from electrolysis powered by renewable or nuclear energy. Also requires significant distribution infrastructure. Hydrogen boilers have been widely demonstrated but have no adoption at scale. They face competition from heat pumps, which make much more efficient use of available renewable electricity.
- Passive solar heating — uses large window areas, appropriately orientated to the sun, to absorb solar energy directly for space heating. In a retrofit situation this approach may need significant building remodelling to enlarge or reorient windows, although a conservatory or sunspace may be an easier add-on alternative. Passive solar heating does not work at night and is likely to only provide a part of the home's heating demand. It may also cause overheating in summer if not appropriately controlled, eg with shades, shutters or blinds.
- Solar thermal heating of domestic hot water — uses roof panels with fluid circulated through it to heat domestic hot water directly. Increasingly consumers choose to use solar PV panels instead, which can also be used to heat water through a diverter or heat pump, but supply electricity for other uses too.
- Biomass — Under some circumstances use of wood burning in a stove or biomass boiler may be considered zero carbon, if the source of the wood is known and it can be confirmed that carbon equivalent to that produced from burning has been captured or will be within a short timescale. However this information is rarely available in practice and biomass has become highly contentious as a zero carbon solution. Additionally, biomass systems normally produce significant local air pollution due to wood smoke.
- In some locations fossil fuelled generators would need to be replaced by solar PV/battery systems.

The cost of these measures to householders is naturally a critical factor. Because conventional systems benefit from economies of scale and installation skills are widely available, new zero carbon technologies may have a higher capital cost, although this may be offset by lower operating costs or efficiency savings, depending on the relative costs of electricity and fossil fuels. For this reason some governments provide householders with grants or subsidies towards the cost of the shift, for example the Boiler Upgrade Scheme in the UK, which helps to fund heat pump installations.

=== Ensure that the house generates more electricity than it consumes from the grid ===
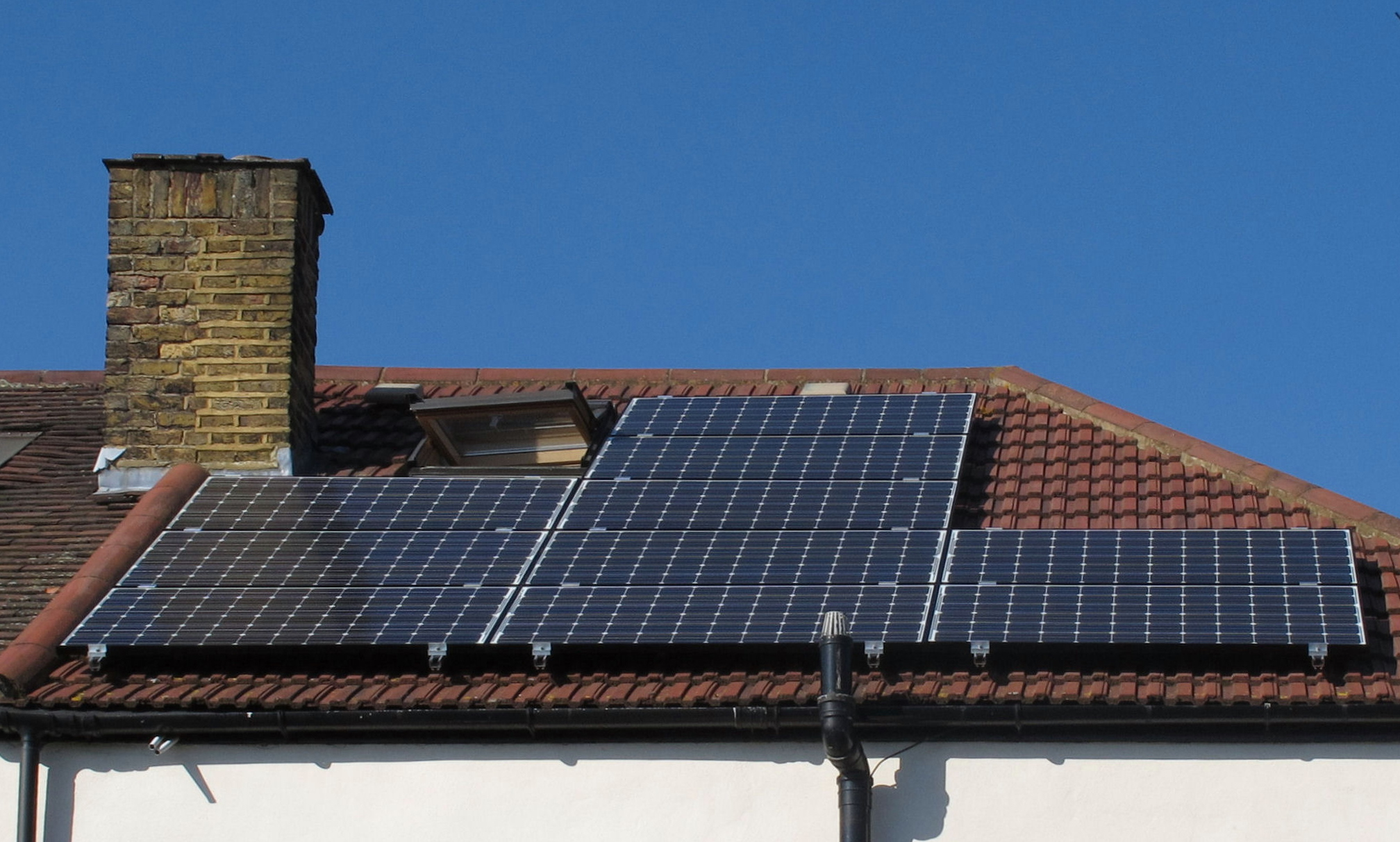
Solar panels installed on the roof

In almost every case the renewable source of choice for dwellings is solar photovoltaic (PV) power. Use of solar PV power is now becoming routine worldwide, as solar power costs have fallen to become the cheapest source of electricity. Solar panels are typically placed on roofs, outhouses, or on the ground near the home, and it is practical for almost all scales of dwelling and most parts of the world. The only exception may be flats / apartments in dense urban areas, which may lack a roof or even any exposure to the sun.

To deliver a zero carbon house, the size /generation capacity of the PV array must match the annual consumption of the house. This is often straightforward, even if the home is using electricity for heating, directly or via a heat pump, or for cooling. In the case of cooling the solar energy availability will match the cooling demand quite well, but this is not the case with winter heating in higher latitudes. In this situation the house will typically import electricity for heating and other purposes in the winter, and export excess solar power in summer. To be net zero the export must exceed the import.

Home batteries are widely used with solar power, to provide electricity at night or dull conditions, and for cost advantage where export rates are low. In this situation it may make financial sense to store rather than reimport electricity.

Other forms of renewable power are possible in domestic situations, including micro hydro and wind turbines, but the larger size of this equipment restricts it to larger farms or estates, or to communal facilities, eg a wind turbine on an apartment block.

=== Maximise energy efficiency ===
Energy efficiency is not strictly necessary to achieve zero carbon housing, so long as the house is able to cover its electricity demand with renewable energy generated on site. However, greater energy efficiency reduces the scale of renewable generation required, and the cost of electricity imported, and may increase comfort by reducing temperature variations. At a national / economy level greater domestic energy efficiency reduces the need for large scale grid generation and transmission infrastructure, and electricity imports. The main energy efficiency approaches are:

Building fabric insulation to reduce space heating and cooling needs: Existing buildings can have their energy consumption cut significantly by insulating walls, floors and roofs, and by related measures such as draughtproofing. While some measures, eg loft/attic insulation using rockwool, are cheap and simple, others such as external wall insulation are more disruptive and expensive. Householders have to make careful analysis of the costs and benefits in terms of energy costs saved. In some countries there is state support for some home insulation measures.

Energy Star Label

Efficient appliances and lighting: these enable a cut in energy consumption without any change in occupant behaviour. For example, modern LED lighting uses 75% less electricity than traditional incandescent bulbs. Almost all appliances including white goods, computers, TVs and refrigerators have been developed to use less electricity, such that even since 1995, when they were a mature product, refrigerators in the EU are estimated to have had their power consumption cut by 60%. But more efficient appliances can more expensive, and consumers find it hard to know or calculate whether the more efficient products are worthwhile. For this reason certification including the Energy Label in the EU, and Energy Star in the United States have been developed to help consumers.

Efficient behaviour: home occupants have a large influence on the energy consumption of the a home. Typical behaviours include:

- whether lights and appliances are switched off when not in use
- frequency of use of washing appliances such as clothes washers, dishwashers and tumble driers, and energy intensity of programs selected (eg washing temperature)
- whether high energy but optional equipment like hot tubs, tumble driers and electric power showers are installed and used
- preferences regarding internal temperature settings for space heating and cooling.

==== Fabric first? ====
A major topic of debate in housing circles is whether retrofit should focus on "fabric first": i.e. maximising energy efficiency before updating energy supply approaches to eliminate fossil fuel use and add renewable generation. Proponents suggest that this approach is necessary to avoid over sizing energy supply systems such as heat pumps and to minimise overall energy demand in the economy. Opponents of fabric first suggest that major building upgrades such as wall and floor insulation and new windows are expensive and disruptive, and may deter residents from taking any action at all to move their homes towards zero carbon. By comparison, they say, energy supply equipment such as heat pumps and solar PV panels are cheaper and deliver larger reductions in carbon emissions and bills.

== Design Considerations for new Zero Carbon Housing ==
There are two main areas to consider in designing and building zero carbon housing:

- Design for maximum energy efficiency and zero carbon energy supply in operation;
- Minimising embedded carbon in the building fabric, so that any carbon payback time is short.

=== Design for maximum energy efficiency and zero carbon energy supply in operation ===
The same approaches as set out in the above section are required, and it is normally cheaper to design these features into a house from the start, than to build a conventional house and retrofit it later. Key design approaches include:

Orientation of the home: In cooler climates the home should be orientated to take full advantage of active (eg PV) and passive solar heating. This involves making roofs face south (in the northern hemisphere) to maximise solar power, and specifying large south facing windows to maximise passive solar heating. Measures must also be taken to minimise overheating in summer, such as blinds, shutters and shading. In hotter climates a house can be orientated North-South to minimise insolation in the middle of the day and reduce overheating and cooling demand, although having a south facing roof for PV is still an advantage.

Attention should also be paid to the layout of multiple houses and surrounding features such as trees, so home solar panels are not shaded by trees or other houses. Tree felling to stop shading should be avoided as this is counterproductive in carbon terms. Joining houses as terraces or semi-detached housing is also advantageous as these houses insulate each other and reduce heat loss. In hotter climates trees should be retained or planted so that they can provide shading to homes and streets and reduce cooling needs.

High insulation and air tightness: this applies to all elements of a building envelope, ie floors, roofs, walls, windows and doors. Building codes and standards in many countries specify levels of insulation required by law in new buildings. For discussion of building insulation codes and technologies worldwide see building insulation. Modern building codes, if complied with, may be adequate to achieve zero carbon in operation if linked with an appropriate energy supply. They may specify either or both of materials performance, normally in terms of the U-Value of a material or combined materials, measured in Watts/m^{2}/K, and/or overall building performance in kWh/m^{2}/year. For example, UK regulations specify walls should be <0.18W/m^{2}K. Building energy consumption rates vary enormously: the UK holder houses use 259kWh/m^{2}, while new houses use 100kWh/m^{2}. However there are indications that better performance is possible, with achievement of 50kWh/m^{2}/yr relatively straightforward through retrofit. Meanwhile the high Passivhaus standard requires no more than 15kWh/m^{2} (for space heating only) which is achievable, though currently considered specialist and high end.

Air tightness refers to minimising air leakage or draught into and out of a building. If cold air leaks in and/or warm air leaks out, this increases heating requirements (or cooling, in hot climates). Air tightness is measured in air changes per hour or AC/H. An example of a high standard of air tightness is the PassivHaus standard which requires less than 0.6AC/H. There is also a need for a minimum air change level, so that damp and stale air does not build up, with negative health impacts for occupants. In order to achieve both requirements a MVHR system is often specified, though this increases costs.

Renewable energy supply integrated into the building: Solar PV panels can be integrated into a roof rather than mounted above conventional roofing materials like tiles. This enables saving on roofing materials and may improve appearance. A house can also be designed for heat pump heating, by specifying underfloor heating which is the best heat emitter for a heat pump: it allows lower flow temperatures which increase heat pump efficiency.

=== Minimising embedded carbon in the building fabric ===
See Green Building.

== Additional Benefits of Zero Carbon Housing ==
=== Health ===
Zero carbon houses offer much cleaner indoor air because they curb fossil fuel combustion which releases volatile gases and pollutants. Appliances such as gas stove, heaters, dryers, and ovens that rely on burning fuel inside the home worsen the air quality indoors and can lead to respiratory issues for the occupants. Not only is the indoor air quality affected, but so is outdoor air quality. Pollution from residential buildings is noted to be responsible for about 15,500 deaths per year in the United States alone. Replacing appliances that run on fossil fuels can improve indoor air quality and reduce asthma symptoms in children by up to 42%, as well as decrease fire hazards in homes.

=== Costs ===
As previously mentioned, energy efficient homes can save the occupant on their utility bills by both replacing their appliances with energy efficient appliances as well as updating their insulation and building envelope. For every $1 invested in improvements towards creating a zero carbon home, approximately $2 are saved in electricity generation and utility costs.

== Success with Zero Carbon Housing ==
It is now routinely possible to achieve net zero carbon housing, even without significant energy efficiency retrofit, by combining heat pump and solar PV technologies. For example, in the UK the average house uses 12,000kWh pa for heating, and 2,900kWh per year for electrical appliances. Using a heat pump to supply this amount of heat will require about 3,000kWh (assuming sCOP of 4). This gives a total electrical demand of 5,900kWh per year, which can be supplied by a solar array of about 6.3 kW (figures derived from Energy Saving Trust calculator in 2024), which is about 16 panels. This approach relies on the grid to supply energy in winter and receive it back in summer, as batteries cannot provide seasonal energy storage. Additional insulation would reduce the heat demand and therefore solar array size needed.

== See also ==
- Green building
- Net energy gain
- Zero heating building
- Zero-energy building
