= Ground loop =

Ground loop may refer to:

- Ground loop (electricity), an unwanted electric current that flows in a conductor connecting two points inadvertently having different potentials
- Ground loop (aviation), the rapid circular rotation of an aircraft in the horizontal plane while on the ground
- Ground-coupled heat exchanger, an underground heat exchanger loop that can capture or dissipate heat to or from the ground
