= List of pioneering solar buildings =

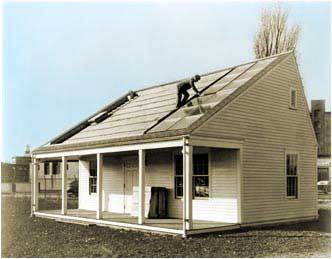
MIT Solar House #1

The following buildings are of significance in pioneering the use of solar powered building design:

- MIT Solar House #1, Massachusetts, United States (Hoyt C. Hottel & others, 1939)
- Howard Sloan House, Glenview, Illinois, United States (George Fred Keck, 1940)
- "Solar Hemicycle", near Madison, Wisconsin, United States (Frank Lloyd Wright, 1944)
- Löf House, Boulder, Colorado, United States (George Löf, 1945)
- Rosenberg House, Tucson, Arizona, United States (Arthur T. Brown, 1946)
- MIT Solar House #2, United States, (Hoyt C. Hottel & others, 1947)
- Peabody House ("Dover Sun House", MIT Solar House #6), Dover, Massachusetts, United States (Eleanor Raymond & Mária Telkes, 1948)
- Henry P. Glass House, Northfield, Illinois, United States (Henry P. Glass, 1948)
- Rose Elementary School, Tucson, Arizona, United States (Arthur T. Brown, 1948)
- MIT Solar House #3, United States, (Hoyt C. Hottel & others, 1949)
- New Mexico State College House, New Mexico, United States (Lawrence Gardenhire, 1953)
- Lefever Solar House, Pennsylvania, United States (HR Lefever, 1954)
- Bliss House, Amado, Arizona, United States (Raymond W. Bliss & M. K. Donavan, 1954)
- Solar Building, Albuquerque, New Mexico, United States (Frank Bridgers & Don Paxton, 1956)
- University of Toronto House, Toronto, Ontario, Canada (EA Allcut, 1956)
- Solar House, Tokyo, Japan (Masanosuke Yanagimachi, 1956)
- Solar House, Bristol, United Kingdom (L Gardner, 1956)
- Curtis House, Rickmansworth, United Kingdom (Edward JW Curtis, 1956)
- Löf House, Denver, Colorado, United States (James M. Hunter & George Löf, 1957)
- AFASE "Living With the Sun" House, Phoenix, Arizona, United States (Peter Lee, Robert L. Bliss & John Yellott, 1958)
- MIT Solar House #4, United States (Hoyt C. Hottel & others, 1958)
- Solar House, Casablanca, Morocco (CM Shaw & Associates, 1958)
- Solar House, Nagoya, Japan (Masanosuke Yanagimachi, 1958)
- Curtiss-Wright "Sun Court," Princeton, New Jersey, United States (Maria Telkes & Aladar Olgyay, 1958)
- "Sun-Tempered House" Van Dresser Residence (Peter van Dresser, 1958)
- Thomason Solar House "Solaris" #1, Washington D.C., United States (Harry Thomason, 1959)
- Passive Solar House, Odeillo, France (Félix Trombe & Jacques Michel, 1967)
- Steve Baer House, Corrales, New Mexico, United States (Steve Baer, 1971)
- Skytherm House, Atascadero, California, United States (Harold R. Hay, 1973)
- Solar One, Newark, Delaware, United States (K.W. Böer & Maria Telkes, 1973)
- MIT Solar Building V, Cambridge, Massachusetts, United States (T.E. Johnson, C.C. Benton, S. Hale, 1978)
- "Unit One" Balcomb Residence, Santa Fe, New Mexico, United States (William Lumpkins, 1979)
- The first Zero Energy Design home, Oklahoma, United States (Larry Hartweg, 1979)
- Saunders Shrewsbury House, Shrewsbury, Massachusetts, United States (Norman B. Saunders, 1981)
- Multiple IEA SHC "Task 13" houses, Worldwide (IEA SHC, 1989)
- Multiple passive houses in Darmstadt, Germany (Bott, Ridder & Westermeyer, 1990)
- Heliotrope, Freiburg im Breisgau, Germany (Rolf Disch, 1994)
- The Druk White Lotus School, Ladakh, India (Arup, 2002)
- 31 Tannery Project, Branchburg, New Jersey, United States (2006)
- Sun Ship, Freiburg im Breisgau, Germany (Rolf Disch, 2006)<ref name="Disch"
- Former St George's Secondary School, Wallasey, Merseyside .Emslie Alexander Morgan(1903–65)

== See also ==
- Passive solar building design
- History of passive solar building design
- Low-energy house
- Energy-plus-house
- Sustainable development
