= Solar chimney =

Ventilation using solar energy

A solar chimney – often referred to as a thermal chimney – is a way of improving the natural ventilation of buildings by using convection of air heated by passive solar energy. A simple description of a solar chimney is that of a vertical shaft utilizing solar energy to enhance the natural stack ventilation through a building.

The solar chimney has been in use for centuries, particularly in West Asia by the Persians, as well as in Europe by the Romans.

== Description ==
In its simplest form, the solar chimney consists of a black-painted chimney. During the day solar energy heats the chimney and the air within it, creating an updraft of air in the chimney. The suction created at the chimney's base can be used to ventilate and cool the building below. In most parts of the world it is easier to harness wind power for such ventilation as with a windcatcher, but on hot windless days a solar chimney can provide ventilation where otherwise there would be none.

There are however a number of solar chimney variations. The basic design elements of a solar chimney are:

- The solar collector area: This can be located in the top part of the chimney or can include the entire shaft. The orientation, type of glazing, insulation and thermal properties of this element are crucial for harnessing, retaining and utilizing solar gains.
- The main ventilation shaft: The location, height, cross section and the thermal properties of this structure are also very important.
- The inlet and outlet air apertures: The sizes, location as well as aerodynamic aspects of these elements are also significant.

A principle has been proposed for solar power generation, using a large greenhouse at the base rather than relying solely on heating the chimney itself. (For further information on this issue, see Solar updraft tower.)

Solar chimneys are painted black so that they absorb the sun's heat more effectively. When the air inside the chimney is heated, it rises and pulls cold air out from under the ground via the heat exchange tubes.

== Solar chimney and sustainable architecture ==
This solar chimney draws air through a geothermal heat exchange to provide passive home cooling.

Solar chimneys, also called heat chimneys or heat stacks, can also be used in architectural settings to decrease the energy used by mechanical systems (systems that heat and cool the building through mechanical means). For decades, air conditioning and mechanical ventilation have been the standard method of environmental control in many building types, especially offices, in developed countries. Pollution and reallocating energy supplies have led to a new environmental approach in building design. Innovative technologies along with bioclimatic principles and traditional design strategies are often combined to create new and potentially successful design solutions. The solar chimney is one of these concepts currently explored by scientists as well as designers, mostly through research and experimentation.

A solar chimney can serve many purposes. Direct sunlight warms air inside the chimney causing it to rise out the top and drawing air in from the bottom. This drawing of air can be used to ventilate a home or office, to draw air through a geothermal heat exchange, or to ventilate only a specific area such as a composting toilet.

Natural ventilation can be created by providing vents in the upper level of a building to allow warm air to rise by convection and escape to the outside. At the same time cooler air can be drawn in through vents at the lower level. Trees may be planted on that side of the building to provide shade for cooler outside air.

This natural ventilation process can be augmented by a solar chimney. The chimney has to be higher than the roof level, and has to be constructed on the wall facing the direction of the Sun. Absorption of heat from the Sun can be increased by using a glazed surface on the side facing the Sun. Heat absorbing material can be used on the opposing side. The size of the heat-absorbing surface is more important than the diameter of the chimney. A large surface area allows for more effective heat exchange with the air necessary for heating by solar radiation. Heating of the air within the chimney will enhance convection, and hence airflow through the chimney. Openings of the vents in the chimney should face away from the direction of the prevailing wind.

To further maximize the cooling effect, the incoming air may be led through underground ducts before it is allowed to enter the building. The solar chimney can be improved by integrating it with a trombe wall. The added advantage of this design is that the system may be reversed during the cold season, providing solar heating instead.

A variation of the solar chimney concept is the solar attic. In a hot sunny climate the attic space is often blazingly hot in the summer. In a conventional building this presents a problem as it leads to the need for increased air conditioning. By integrating the attic space with a solar chimney, the hot air in the attic can be put to work. It can help the convection in the chimney, improving ventilation.

The use of a solar chimney may benefit natural ventilation and passive cooling strategies of buildings thus help reduce energy use, CO_{2} emissions and pollution in general. Potential benefits regarding natural ventilation and use of solar chimneys are:

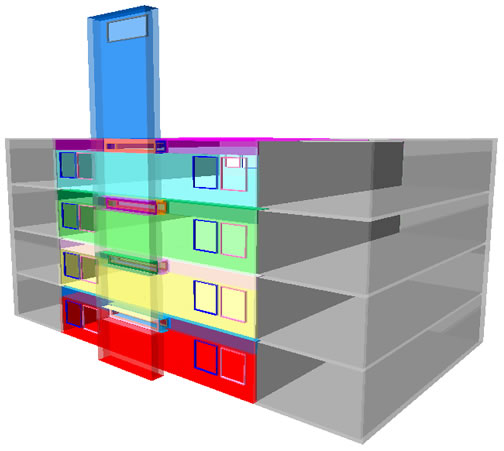
CAD (TAS) Solar Chimney model

- improved ventilation rates on still, hot days
- reduced reliance on wind and wind driven ventilation
- improved control of air flow through a building
- greater choice of air intake (i.e. leeward side of building)
- improved air quality and reduced noise levels in urban areas
- increased night time ventilation rates
- ventilation of narrow, small spaces with minimal exposure to external elements

Potential benefits regarding passive cooling may include:

- improved passive cooling during warm season (mostly on still, hot days)
- improved night cooling rates
- enhanced performance of thermal mass (cooling, cool storage)
- improved thermal comfort (improved air flow control, reduced draughts)

== Precedent Study: The Environmental Building ==
The Building Research Establishment (BRE) office building in Garston, Watford, United Kingdom, incorporates solar-assisted passive ventilation stacks as part of its ventilation strategy.

Designed by architects Feilden Clegg Bradley, the BRE offices aim to reduce energy consumption and CO_{2} emissions by 30% from current best practice guidelines and sustain comfortable environmental conditions without the use of air conditioning. The passive ventilation stacks, solar shading, and hollow concrete slabs with embedded under floor cooling are key features of this building. Ventilation and heating systems are controlled by the building management system (BMS) while a degree of user override is provided to adjust conditions to occupants' needs.

The building utilizes five vertical shafts as an integral part of the ventilation and cooling strategy. The main components of these stacks are a south facing glass-block wall, thermal mass walls and stainless steel round exhausts rising a few meters above roof level. The chimneys are connected to the curved hollow concrete floor slabs which are cooled via night ventilation. Pipes embedded in the floor can provide additional cooling utilizing groundwater.

On warm windy days air is drawn in through passages in the curved hollow concrete floor slabs. Stack ventilation naturally rising out through the stainless steel chimneys enhances the air flow through the building. The movement of air across the chimney tops enhances the stack effect. During warm, still days, the building relies mostly on the stack effect while air is taken from the shady north side of the building. Low-energy fans in the tops of the stacks can also be used to improve airflow.

Overnight, control systems enable ventilation paths through the hollow concrete slab removing the heat stored during the day, which then remains cold for the following day. The exposed curved ceiling gives more surface area than a flat ceiling would, acting as a heat sink, again providing summer cooling. Research based on actual performance measurements of the passive stacks found that they enhanced the cooling ventilation of the space during warm and still days and may also have the potential to assist night-time cooling due to their thermally massive structure.

== Passive down-draft cool tower ==
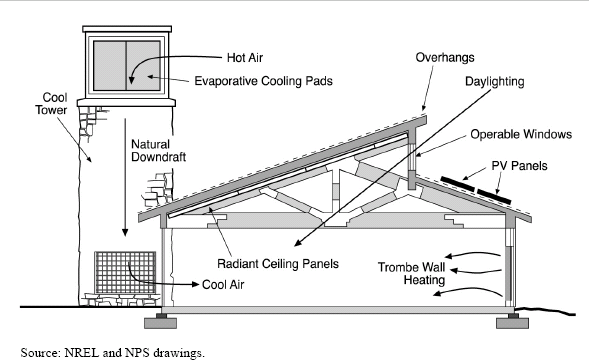
Cool tower at Zion National Park's Visitor Center provides cool air.

A technology closely related to the solar chimney is the evaporative down-draft cooltower. In areas with a hot, arid climate this approach may contribute to a sustainable way to provide air conditioning for buildings.

The principle is to allow water to evaporate at the top of a tower, either by using evaporative cooling pads or by spraying water. Evaporation cools the incoming air, causing a downdraft of cool air that will bring down the temperature inside the building. Airflow can be increased by using a solar chimney on the opposite side of the building to help in venting hot air to the outside. This concept has been used for the Visitor Center of Zion National Park. The Visitor Center was designed by the High Performance Buildings Research of the National Renewable Energy Laboratory (NREL).

The principle of the downdraft cooltower has been proposed for solar power generation as well. (See Energy tower for more information.)

Evaporation of moisture from the pads on top of the Toguna buildings built by the Dogon people of Mali, Africa, contribute to the coolness felt by the men who rest underneath. The women's buildings on the outskirts of town are functional as more conventional solar chimneys.

== See also ==
- Ab anbar
- Autonomous building
- Earth cooling tubes
- Evaporative cooling
- HVAC
- Manitoba Hydro Place
- Natural ventilation
- Passive house
- Stack effect
- Toguna
- Ventilation (architecture)
- Yakhchāl

== Sources ==
- Afonso, Clito; Oliveira, Armando (June 2000). "Solar chimneys: Simulation and experiment". Energy and Buildings. 32 (1). IOP Publishing Limited: 71–79. Bibcode:2000EneBu..32...71A. doi:10.1016/S0378-7788(99)00038-9.
- Trombe, A.; Serres, L. (1994). "Air-earth exchanger study in real site experimentation and simulation". Energy and Buildings. 21 (2): 155–162. Bibcode:1994EneBu..21..155T. doi:10.1016/0378-7788(94)90008-6.
- Szikra, Csaba (April 2004). "Hybrid ventilation systems" (PDF). Archived from the original (PDF) on 2006-08-18.
- Pearlmutter, D.; E. Erell; Y. Etzion; I. A. Meir; H. Di (March 1996). "Refining the use of evaporation in an experimental down-draft cool tower". Energy and Buildings. 23 (3). Elsevier: 191–197. Bibcode:1996EneBu..23..191P. doi:10.1016/0378-7788(95)00944-2. Archived from the original on 2007-04-09.
- Dai, Y. J.; K. Sumathy; R. Z. Wang; Y. G. Li (January 2003). "Enhancement of natural ventilation in a solar house with a solar chimney and a solid adsorption cooling cavity". Solar Energy. 74 (1). Elsevier Science B.V.: 65–75. Bibcode:2003SoEn...74...65D. doi:10.1016/S0038-092X(03)00106-3.
