= Curtis House, Rickmansworth =

Solar house in England

The Curtis House, Rickmansworth was the first solar house constructed in the United Kingdom. The house, in Rickmansworth, England, was built in 1956 by British architect Edward Curtis, for his own occupation.
