= Zero heating building =

Building without heating demand

Zero-heating building or nearly zero-heating building (nZHB) is a building having essentially zero heating demand, defined as having heating demand, Q'_{NH}, less than 3 kWh/(m^{2}a). The zero-heating building is intended for use in heating-dominated areas. The purpose of the zero-heating building is to supersede net-zero energy buildings as a way to bring building-related greenhouse gas emissions to zero in the EU. Zero-heating buildings address flawed net-zero energy buildings: the requirement for seasonal energy storage, in some cases poor comfort of living and narrow design options.

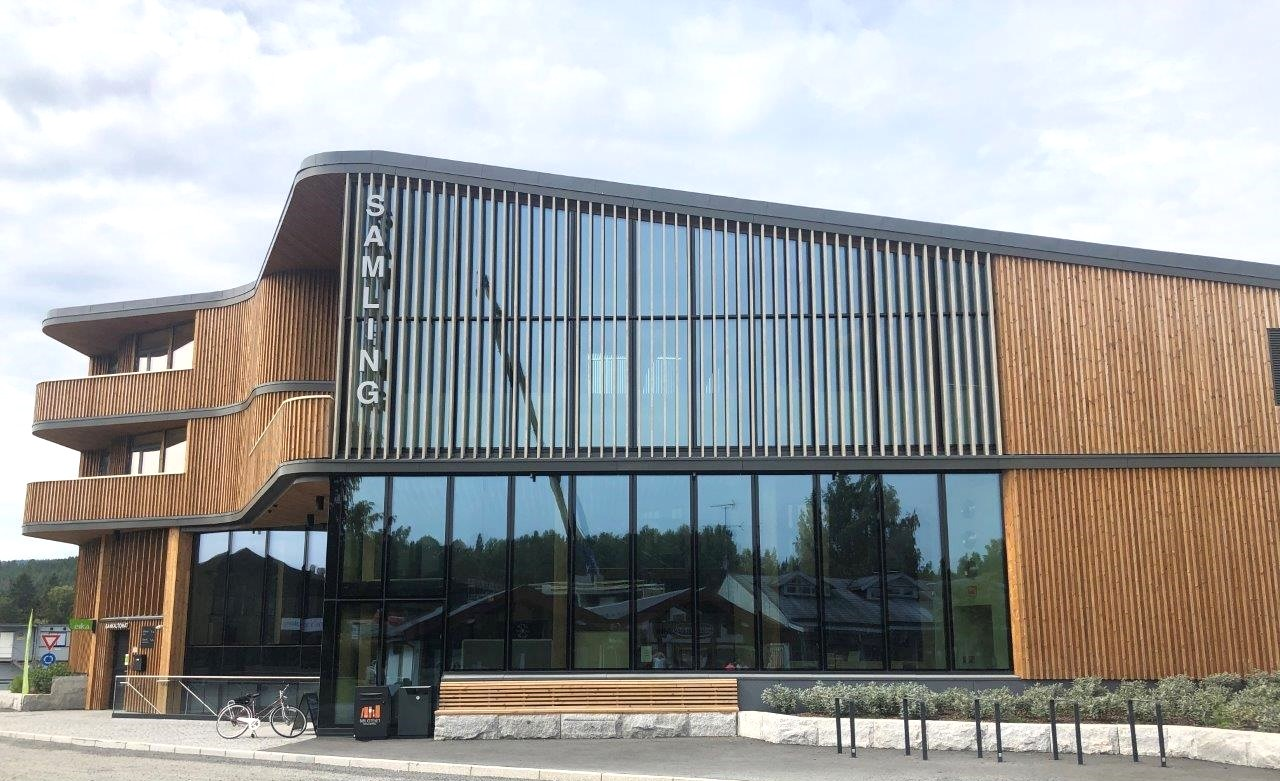
The zero heating library in Nord Odal, Norway (2020). Q-Air® 6-pane glazing by Reflex, Slovenia, U_{g} value of 0.26 W/(m^{2}K)

== Concept and approach ==
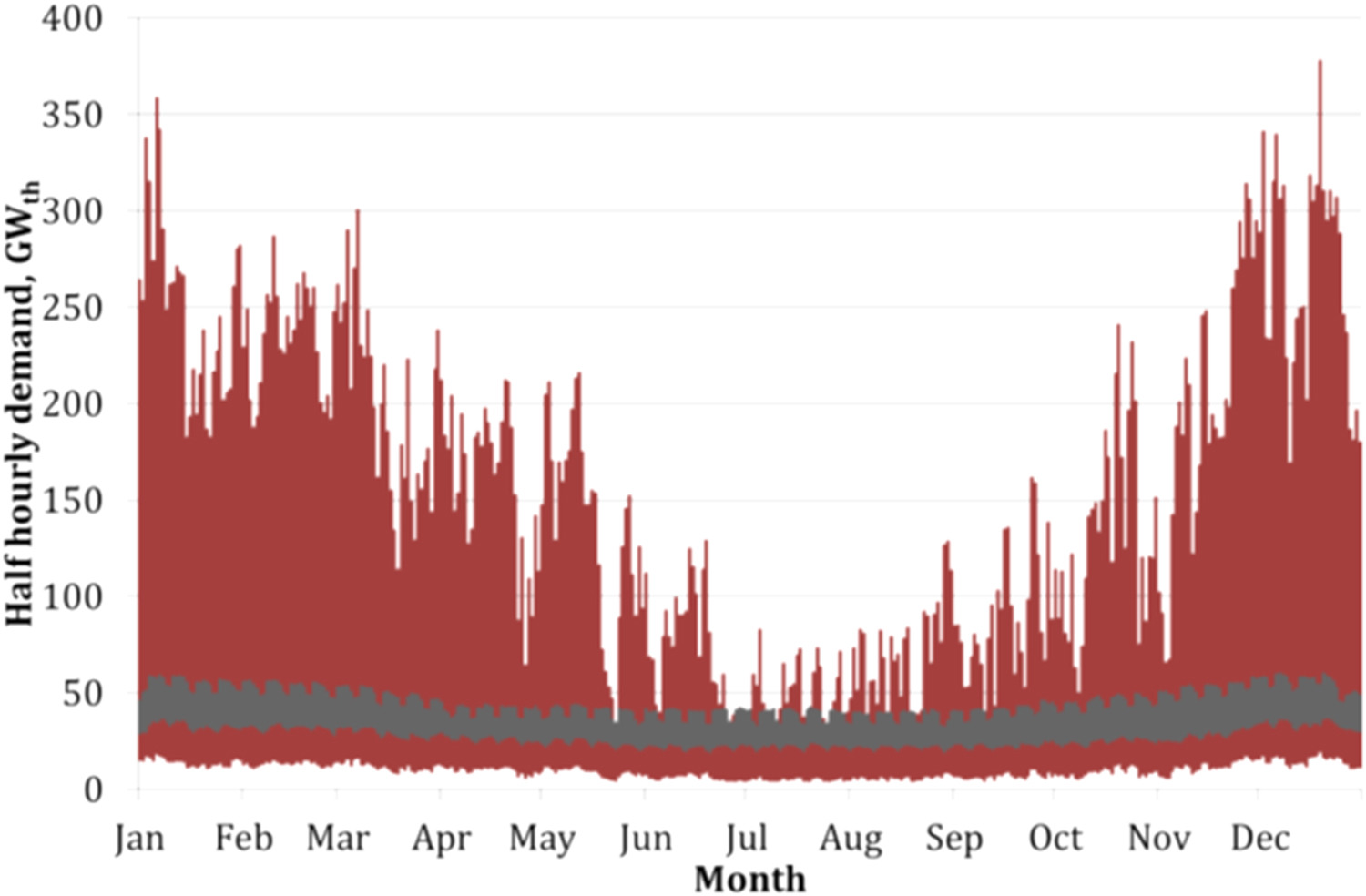
Synthesized GB half-hourly domestic and non-domestic heat demand for January to December 2010 and actual GB electricity demand

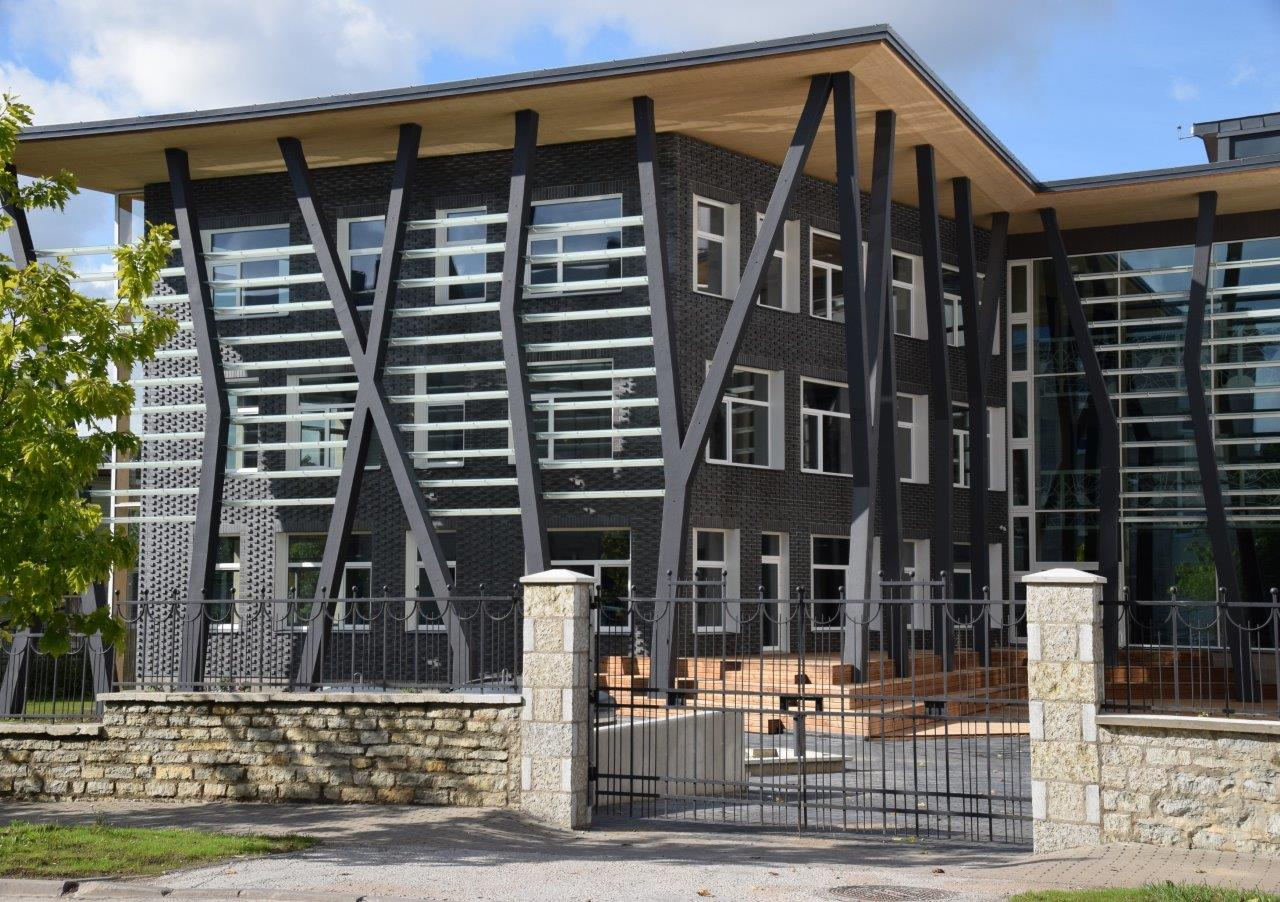
Nearly zero heating office building in Rakvere, Estonia (2014)

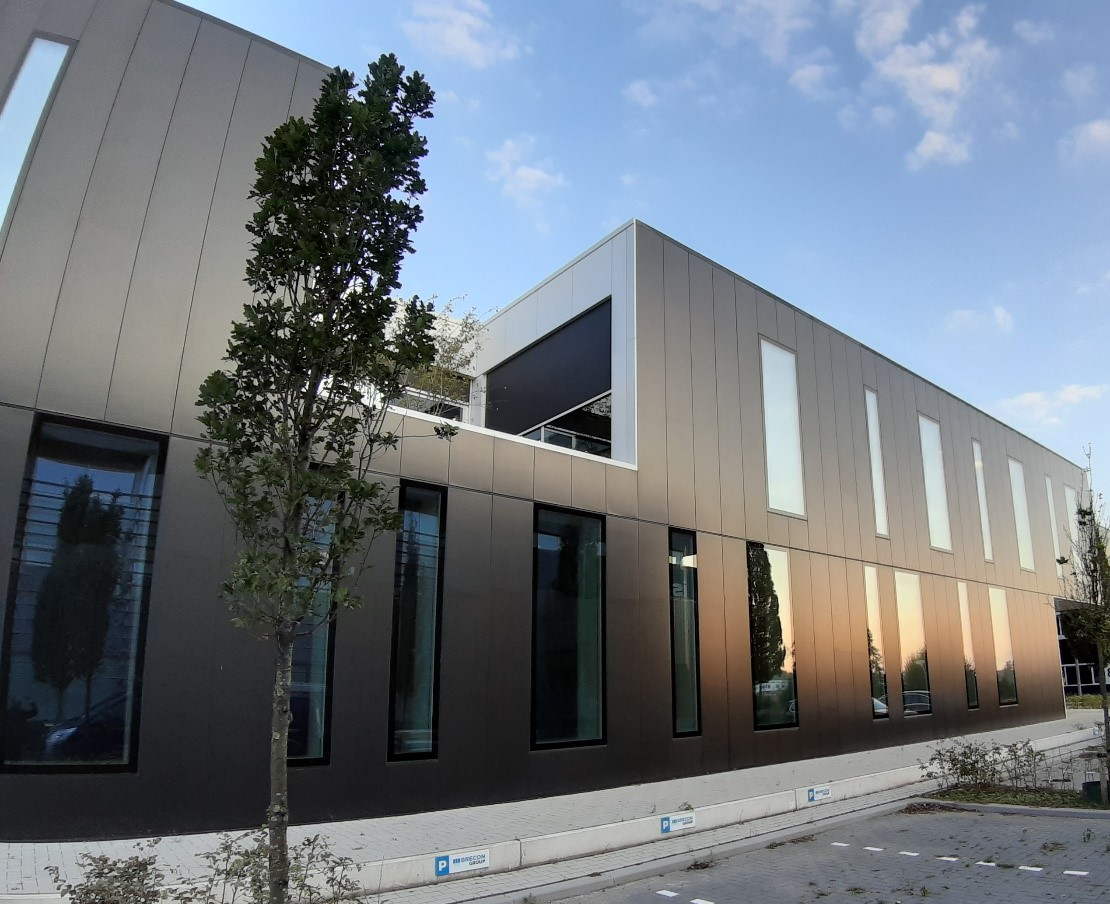
The zero heating office building, in Netherlands (2017). Q-Air® 6-pane glazing by Reflex, Slovenia, U_{g} value of 0.26 W/(m^{2}K)

=== Seasonal energy storage problem ===
In areas where there is substantial heating demand, it is hard to fill this demand with renewable power as in heating season, solar power is in short supply. This means heating in highly urbanized areas is directly or indirectly powered by, in a large part from fossil sources. About 2000 TWh of seasonal energy storage is needed to meet EU's winter heating demand, should it be alleviated from fossil fuel dependency. Since heating is partially routed through electricity (e.g., heat-pumps) there is also a clear need for seasonal electricity storage. In Germany alone, about 40 TWh seasonal storage is required. The zero-heating building overcomes the need for major societal infrastructural changes required by the net-zero energy buildings and thus addresses major concerns.

=== Zero heating building as a continuation of the Passive house ===
Zero-heating buildings are built in the similar way as Passive houses while taking advantage in the recent developments in ultra-low U-value glazing. It has been shown that for buildings with window U-values approaching 0.3 W/(m^{2}K) the heating demand diminishes. In this way, the building would not need a winter power reserve, and it obviously would not need any seasonal energy storage. Buildings built according to Passive-house standard can provide for removal of the central heating appliance with an only small auxiliary heating provision in the ventilation system.

=== First examples ===
In 1995, Wolfgang Feist demonstrated that with a glazing U-value of 0.3 W/(m^{2}K) zero-heating buildings could be realized. The first purpose build (nearly) zero heating building is an office building, built in Rakvere, Estonia in 2014. Since 2015, more examples have been built based on the novel ultra-low U-value glazing.

=== Further developments of the Zero-heating building ===
A zero-heating building is proposed as a cornerstone of a market acceptable solution to the problem of the CO_{2} mitigation through reduction of the need for seasonal energy storage. Above the reduction of the need for energy storage, there are deletions in shading and truncation in heating arrangements. Abandoning now common modulated external shades and switching to more cost-efficient multipane glazing with built-in solar control glass somewhat increases cooling demand. The zero-heating building should be designed to keep cooling demand, Q'_{NC}, less than 20 kWh/(m^{2}a) for office buildings and less than 15 kWh/(m^{2}a) for all other types. After capitalizing on the effects made by nearly zero-heating building one can further equip such a building with PV, to obtain something of a winter positive energy building which could in principle speed-up alleviation of societal energy problems by providing extra power on time. The remaining cooling and ventilation demand can thus be favorably synchronized with solar radiation, where maximum photovoltaic generation nearly coincides with the maximum power needed for cooling.

== Standards ==
In 2020 a consortium partners: Reflex, Faculty Of Mechanical Engineering - Ljubljana, Passivhaus Institut, Tallinn University of Technology (TalTech) and Norwegian University of Science and Technology (NTNU) has been established to work on Zero-heating building standardization, development and promotion.

== Construction costs ==
Quadruple glazing, as the main add-on component to the passive house, cost is essentially that of triple-glazing plus one more intermediate glass pane at about €10 /m^{2}. As quadruple units allow for U-value of glazing to be less than 0.4 W/(m^{2}K), external modulated sun shading, and its substantial cost can be omitted without any loss of energy performance. Pricing reality at the moment is different. As there is no long-term experience, design guideline and an established evaluation standard, there is a tendency to price quadruple glazing units at a cost of quadruple unit plus the cost of triple unit, just in case if something later turned to go seriously wrong requiring building glazing replacement.

== Traits of zero-heating buildings ==
=== Marketability analysis ===
Marketability failure of energy efficient buildings and inefficiency in integrated design approach are the main causes of low market penetration of energy efficient buildings. Compared to merely focusing on the energy-efficiency enhancement, increasing the number of energy efficient buildings with a better marketability via enhancement of their aesthetic features (product differentiation) is proposed as the approach for energy demand reduction in the building sector. The empirical evidence so far shows clearly that the enhancement of aesthetic features and window design can be a supplementary approach to overcome the current market barriers such as a high initial cost, a low market value and a lack of market demand for energy efficient buildings. The research has identified increased glazing area as the main desired architectural product differentiation. If features such as maintenance cost, service reliability and tenant comfort; some specific differentiating features are indoor air quality, natural light distribution, and fresh air circulation are included in marketing communications, the probability to go for green buildings is likely to be higher.

=== Design freedom ===
Due to the exceptionally low U-values of glazing used, glazed areas are not limited in size due to energy requirements. nZEB building can be realized with 100% glazed walls. This removes some constraints imposed on the building design by the double and triple-pane glazing. Most notably, a zero heating building does not need to be purposefully built as a passive solar building.

=== Comfort ===
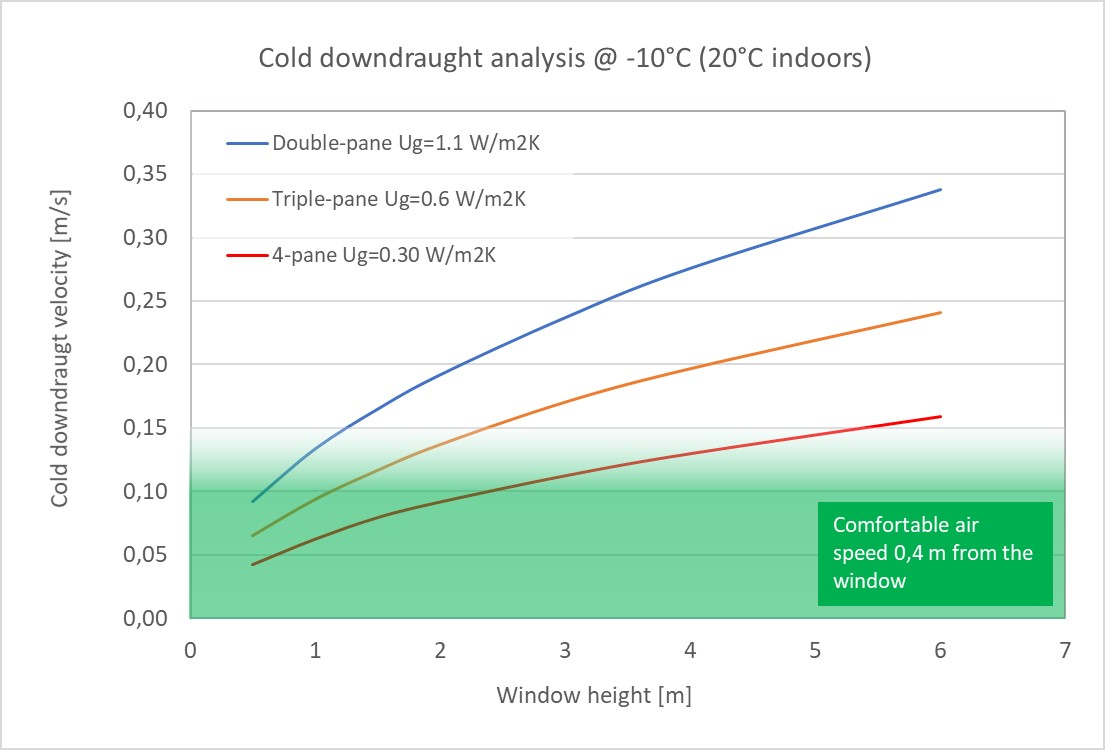
Cold downdraught 0.4 m from the window calculated for double-pane, triple-pane and Krypton filled quadruple-pane glazing at indicated glazing heights

The well-being of the occupants of a building is an important parameter determined by the environmental quality of the interior. Limited or no contact with the environment and living and working with minimal daylight are often a consequence of dynamic sun shading. On the contrary, multipane glazing offers uninterrupted contact with the environment. Low, seasonally selective solar gain offers summer comfort, while a system U-value of approximately 0.3 W/(m^{2}K) offers nearly zero heating demand in winter even in Scandinavia. A low system U-value maintains inside glass temperatures at a consistent level throughout the year. Furthermore, an unprecedented draught-free zone is created around the panoramic glazing.

== See also ==
- Passive solar building design
- History of passive solar building design
- Building insulation
- Zero carbon housing
- Passive house
