= Carbon emission label =

A carbon emission label or carbon label describes the carbon dioxide emissions created as a by-product of manufacturing, transporting, or disposing of a consumer product. This information is important to consumers wishing to minimize their ecological footprint and contribution to global warming made by their purchases.

== Existing programs ==
The world's first carbon label, the Carbon Reduction Label, shows the carbon footprint embodied in a product and was first introduced in the UK in 2006 by the Carbon Trust. Examples of products featuring their carbon footprint are Walkers Crisps, Kingsmill bread, British Sugar, Cemex cement, Marshalls paving and Quaker Oats, which have all used the label. One of the biggest supporters of carbon labelling was Tesco, who began labelling a range of products including washing detergent, light bulbs, oranges, milk and toilet paper in 2007. In 2012 the scheme was terminated due to unforeseen costs and lack of take-up by other businesses. HBOS feature it on their online bank account.

The Carbon Trust label also requires companies to commit to reduce the embodied carbon in the labeled product or they lose the right to feature the label. An independent panel is currently verifying the process alongside Defra and the British Standards Institute BSI and a new standard PAS 2050 is due to be introduced in mid-2008. As of August 2009, Defra is undertaking a radical rethink of the food industry on issues of security and sustainability, among many things proposing a green labelling scheme for food products.

The Toronto-based CarbonCounted label started in January 2007. It uses a live carbon supply chain to determine the amount of carbon dioxide emitted to bring a product to market. This third party certified system, based on an open standard, eliminates the need for heavy auditing and guess work associated with values determined when using isolated accounting methods. This also addresses how to consistently and fairly apply the smaller details such as the heating, cooling, lighting etc. in the shops the products are sold in.

Another label initiative started in spring 2008 in Switzerland. The independent association climatop labels the most climate friendly products with their label "approved by climatop". In contrast to the label of Carbon Trust, this label does not indicate the carbon footprint of a specific product, it labels those products out of a comparable group of products with a remarkably lower carbon charge. As a rule of thumb, products have to be at least 20% better than other products from the same category. Therefore life cycle assessments or the products are calculated by independent offices, and the calculations are reviewed by a third party. Beside the fact that it has to be proven that those products have a lower climate charge, the products also have to fulfil several environmental and social standards. Examples of labeled products can be found at the Swiss retailer Migros, such as an organic fair trade sugar from Paraguay, recycling kitchen towels or laundry detergents. This approach has been shown to influence customer purchasing decisions.

Japan announced a carbon footprint labelling scheme in 2008. The labels appeared on dozens of items including food and drink starting in April 2009, providing detailed breakdowns of each product's carbon footprint under a government-approved calculation and labeling system.

== Proposed programs ==
California state representative Ira Ruskin sponsored a carbon labeling bill—the Carbon Labeling Act of 2009—in the California state legislature, which has been voted out of the Assembly Committee on Natural Resources. The act would require the State Air Resources Board to develop and implement a program for the voluntary assessment, verification, and standardized labeling of the carbon footprint of consumer products sold in the state.

In the United States, the Clean Energy Standard (CES) mandates that electric utilities generate a certain percentage of their power from clean energy sources.

== See also ==
- Ecolabel
- Emissions trading
- Energy input labeling
- Food miles
