= Global Home Education Exchange =

United States organization

- Abbreviation: GHEX
- Formation: 2012
- Founder: Gerald Huebner
- Type: Advocacy organization
- Purpose: Homeschool advocacy
- Website: ghex.world

The Global Home Education Exchange (GHEX) is an advocacy organization that primarily holds international events promoting homeschooling.

== History ==
GHEX was founded in 2012 by Gerald Huebner, the board chair of the Canadian branch of the Home School Legal Defense Association (HSLDA). GHEX describes its role as advocacy, research and outreach about homeschooling.

GHEX has been criticized for its ties to the Christian Right and its advocacy for various conservative political and religious causes. Political researchers Julia Mourao Permoser and Kristina Stoeckl investigated the links between GHEX and other rightwing homeschooling organisations, notably the HSLDA, the World Congress of Families, Swedish group ROHUS, the Alliance Defending Freedom, and Spanish organisation CitizenGo. According to Permoser and Stoeckl, "this advocacy coalition is composed of highly conservative actors generally associated with an anti-rights agenda (anti-gay rights, anti-women’s rights, anti-children’s rights)."

=== Events ===
GHEX has organised events in Berlin (2012), Rio de Janeiro (2016), Saint Petersburg and Moscow (2018). One of the speakers at the Russian event was Pavel Parfentiev, who claimed to be instrumental in achieving an adoption ban for LGBT parents in Russia. The World Congress of Families partnered the Russian events. An event planned for the Philippines (2020) appears to have been held online.
