= Solar air conditioning =

Cooling system that uses solar power

Solar air conditioning, or "solar-powered air conditioning", refers to any air conditioning (cooling) system that uses solar power.

This can be done through passive solar design, solar thermal energy conversion, and photovoltaic conversion (sunlight to electricity). The U.S. Energy Independence and Security Act of 2007 created 2008 through 2012 funding for a new solar air conditioning research and development program, which should develop and demonstrate multiple new technology innovations and mass production economies of scale.

== History ==
In the late 19th century, the most common fluid for absorption cooling was a solution of ammonia and water. Today, the combination of lithium bromide and water is also in common use. One end of the system of expansion/condensation pipes is heated, and the other end gets cold enough to make ice. Originally, natural gas was used as a heat source in the late 19th century. Today, propane is used in recreational vehicle absorption chiller refrigerators. Hot water solar thermal energy collectors can also be used as the modern "free energy" heat source. A National Aeronautics and Space Administration (NASA) sponsored report in 1976 surveyed solar energy system applications of air conditioning. Techniques discussed included both solar powered (absorption cycle and heat engine / Rankine cycle) and solar related (heat pump) along with an extensive bibliography of related literature.

== Photovoltaic (PV) solar cooling ==
Photovoltaics can provide either indirect solar air conditioning power or, now, directly power to air conditioners. Indirect photovoltaic power for air conditioners consists of whole-house or whole-building solar which, traditionally for most users, has also meant net metering to the grid. Solar in this case is inverted to alternating current (AC) to run the appliances in the house or building, including the air conditioner(s). The advantage of this is the air conditioners don’t need any special electronics to accommodate solar, so it’s a simple implementation. The disadvantage is that these air conditioners usually have a SEER value of 14 or less, and the supplied solar has some loss from the power conversion of DC (direct current) solar to AC even before it reaches the air conditioners. Another disadvantage is that these air conditioners cannot run when the grid is down, since, in effect, the net-metered home or building is a node on the grid, and utilities need to prevent backfeeding power into a dead grid when the grid’s down. And, now, air conditioners, like many home appliances (e.g., TVs, computers) are beginning to run on DC power. So, whole-building solar for such units needs to be inverted to alternating current, and then rectified back to direct current, further increasing inefficiencies.

Off-grid solar arrays instead use batteries to supply whole-house or whole-building solar. Such systems employ a voltage controller to manage battery charging, and then the battery power is inverted to provide alternating current for the home or building. Since they’re not grid tied or net metered, they can operate after a storm or other event brings down grid power. However, the power, once again, must be converted from DC from the solar panels and batteries to AC by inversion to run power remotely to the appliances.

More recently, true solar-powered photovoltaic air conditioners heat pumps have been developed. Such units run using DC power, and, as such, they can and do make use of the inherent DC power generated by photovoltaic solar panels. One mini split version of this units employs a 48v DC power bus and a 48v battery array, usually 4 x 12v batteries in series (e.g., Hotspot Energy). Unlike the whole-house battery system, though, these batteries only run the air conditioner. The advantage of these systems is that, with enough solar and battery capacity, they can run at night or when it’s cloudy. Another mini split version allows the solar panels to be plugged directly to the outside part of the unit, uses a 310v DC power bus, and offers optional 120v plug-in backup grid power (Airspool) to be leveraged to fill in any lack of solar power available. The advantage of these inverter DC air conditioners is the lower cost, while the disadvantage is that they have no way to run without solar unless they're plugged in. Both of these systems make use variable refrigerant flow technology, with high-efficiency variable-speed DC motors and compressors to require very little run power, and both also offer heat in addition to air conditioning. A third type of unit is available for larger, usually commercial, buildings and offers both grid and battery backup as well as optional net metering. Like the two smaller units, these units are VRF, but unlike them, there’s an option to run heating in one part of the building and air conditioning in another part, making use of one outside/condensing unit and multiple inside/evaporative units located in different areas of the building to condition that areas based on specific user needs.

Photovoltaic can be combined with geothermal technology, too. An efficient geothermal air conditioning system would require a smaller, less-expensive photovoltaic system. A high-quality geothermal heat pump installation can have a SEER in the range of 20 (±). A 29 kW (100,000 BTU/h) SEER 20 air conditioner would require less than 5 kW while operating.

There are also new non-compressor-based electrical air conditioning systems with a SEER above 20 coming on the market. New versions of phase-change indirect evaporative coolers use nothing but a fan and a supply of water to cool buildings without adding extra interior humidity (such as at McCarran Airport Las Vegas Nevada). In dry arid climates with relative humidity below 45% (about 40% of the continental U.S.) indirect evaporative coolers can achieve a SEER above 20, and up to SEER 40. A 29 kW (100,000 BTU/h) indirect evaporative cooler would only need enough photovoltaic power for the circulation fan (plus a water supply).

A less-expensive partial-power photovoltaic system can reduce (but not eliminate) the monthly amount of electricity purchased from the power grid for air conditioning (and other uses). With American state government subsidies of $2.50 to US$5.00 per photovoltaic watt, the amortized cost of PV-generated electricity can be below $0.15 per kWh. This is currently cost effective in some areas where power company electricity is now $0.15 or more. Excess PV power generated when air conditioning is not required can be sold to the power grid in many locations, which can reduce or eliminate annual net electricity purchase requirement. (See Zero-energy building)

Superior energy efficiency can be designed into new construction (or retrofitted to existing buildings). Since the U.S. Department of Energy was created in 1977, their Weatherization Assistance Program has reduced heating-and-cooling load on 5.5 million low-income affordable homes an average of 31%. A hundred million American buildings still need improved weatherization. Careless conventional construction practices are still producing inefficient new buildings that need weatherization when they are first occupied.

== Geothermal cooling ==
Earth sheltering or earth cooling tubes can take advantage of the ambient temperature of the earth to reduce or eliminate conventional air conditioning requirements. In many climates where the majority of humans live, they can greatly reduce the buildup of undesirable summer heat, and also help remove heat from the interior of the building. They increase construction cost, but reduce or eliminate the cost of conventional air conditioning equipment.

Earth cooling tubes are not cost effective in hot humid tropical environments where the ambient Earth temperature approaches human temperature comfort zone. A solar chimney or photovoltaic-powered fan can be used to exhaust undesired heat and draw in cooler, dehumidified air that has passed by ambient Earth temperature surfaces. Control of humidity and condensation are important design issues.

A geothermal heat pump uses ambient earth temperature to improve SEER for heat and cooling. A deep well recirculates water to extract ambient earth temperature, typically at 8 litres (2 US gal) of water per metric ton per minute. These "open loop" systems were the most common in early systems, however water quality could cause damage to the coils in the heat pump and shorten the life of the equipment. Another method is a closed loop system, in which a loop of tubing is run down a well or wells, or in trenches in the lawn, to cool an intermediate fluid. When wells are used, they are back-filled with bentonite grout or another grout material to ensure good thermal conductivity to the earth.

In the past the fluid of choice was a 50/50 mixture of propylene glycol because it is non-toxic unlike ethylene glycol (which is used in car radiators). Propylene glycol is viscous, and would eventually gum up some parts in the loop(s), so it has fallen out of favor. Today, the most common transfer agent is a mixture of water and ethyl alcohol (ethanol).

Ambient earth temperature is much lower than peak summer air temperature, and much higher than the lowest extreme winter air temperature. Water is 25 times more thermally conductive than air, so it is much more efficient than an outside air heat pump, (which becomes less effective when the outside temperature drops in winter).

The same type of geothermal well can be used without a heat pump but with greatly diminished results. Ambient earth temperature water is pumped through a shrouded radiator (like an automobile radiator). Air is blown across the radiator, which cools without a compressor-based air conditioner. Photovoltaic solar electric panels produce electricity for the water pump and fan, eliminating conventional air-conditioning utility bills. This concept is cost-effective, as long as the location has ambient earth temperature below the human thermal comfort zone (not the tropics).

== Solar open-loop air conditioning using desiccants ==
Air can be passed over common, solid desiccants (like silica gel or zeolite) or liquid desiccants (like lithium bromide/chloride) to draw moisture from the air to allow an efficient mechanical or evaporative cooling cycle. The desiccant is then regenerated by using solar thermal energy to dehumidify, in a cost-effective, low-energy-consumption, continuously repeating cycle. A photovoltaic system can power a low-energy air circulation fan, and a motor to slowly rotate a large disk filled with desiccant.

Energy recovery ventilation systems provide a controlled way of ventilating a home while minimizing energy loss. Air is passed through an "enthalpy wheel" (often using silica gel) to reduce the cost of heating ventilated air in the winter by transferring heat from the warm inside air being exhausted to the fresh (but cold) supply air. In the summer, the inside air cools the warmer incoming supply air to reduce ventilation cooling costs. This low-energy fan-and-motor ventilation system can be cost-effectively powered by photovoltaics, with enhanced natural convection exhaust up a solar chimney - the downward incoming air flow would be forced convection (advection).

A desiccant like calcium chloride can be mixed with water to create a recirculating waterfall that dehumidifies a room using solar thermal energy to regenerate the liquid, and a PV-powered low-rate water pump to circulate liquid.

Active solar cooling wherein solar thermal collectors provide input energy for a desiccant cooling system. There are several commercially available systems that blow air through a desiccant impregnated medium for both the dehumidification and the regeneration cycle. The solar heat is one way that the regeneration cycle is powered. In theory packed towers can be used to form a counter-current flow of the air and the liquid desiccant but are not normally employed in commercially available machines. Preheating of the air is shown to greatly enhance desiccant regeneration. The packed column yields good results as a dehumidifier/regenerator, provided pressure drop can be reduced with the use of suitable packing.

== Passive solar cooling ==
In this type of cooling solar thermal energy is not used directly to create a cold environment or drive any direct cooling processes. Instead, solar building design aims at slowing the rate of heat transfer into a building in the summer, and improving the removal of unwanted heat. It involves a good understanding of the mechanisms of heat transfer: heat conduction, convective heat transfer, and thermal radiation, the latter primarily from the sun.

For example, a sign of poor thermal design is an attic that gets hotter in summer than the peak outside air temperature. This can be significantly reduced or eliminated with a cool roof or a green roof, which can reduce the roof surface temperature by 70 °F (40 °C) in summer. A radiant barrier and an air gap below the roof will block about 97% of downward radiation from roof cladding heated by the sun.

Passive solar cooling is much easier to achieve in new construction than by adapting existing buildings. There are many design specifics involved in passive solar cooling. It is a primary element of designing a zero energy building in a hot climate.

== Solar closed-loop absorption cooling ==
Closed-loop air conditioning commonly uses the following materials for water-based absorption:

- Ammonia
- Lithium Bromide
- Lithium Chloride
- Silica Gel
- Zeolite

An alternative to water-based systems is to use methanol with activated carbon.

Active solar cooling uses solar thermal collectors to provide solar energy to thermally driven chillers (usually adsorption or absorption chillers). Solar energy heats a fluid that provides heat to the generator of an absorption chiller and is recirculated back to the collectors. The heat provided to the generator drives a cooling cycle that produces chilled water. The chilled water produced is used for large commercial and industrial cooling.

Solar thermal energy can be used to efficiently cool in the summer, and also heat domestic hot water and buildings in the winter. Single, double or triple iterative absorption cooling cycles are used in different solar-thermal-cooling system designs. The more cycles, the more efficient they are. Absorption chillers operate with less noise and vibration than compressor-based chillers, but their capital costs are relatively high.

Efficient absorption chillers nominally require water of at least 190 °F (88 °C). Common, inexpensive flat-plate solar thermal collectors only produce about 160 °F (71 °C) water. High temperature flat plate, concentrating (CSP) or evacuated tube collectors are needed to produce the higher temperature transfer fluids required. In large scale installations there are several projects successful both technical and economical in operation worldwide including, for example, at the headquarters of Caixa Geral de Depósitos in Lisbon with 1,579 square metres (17,000 sq ft) solar collectors and 545 kW cooling power or on the Olympic Sailing Village in Qingdao/China. In 2011 the most powerful plant at Singapore's new constructed United World College will be commissioned (1500 kW).

These projects have shown that flat plate solar collectors specially developed for temperatures over 200 °F (93 °C) (featuring double glazing, increased backside insulation, etc.) can be effective and cost-efficient. Where water can be heated well above 190 °F (88 °C), it can be stored and used when the sun is not shining.

The Audubon Environmental Center at the Ernest E. Debs Regional Park in Los Angeles has an example solar air conditioning installation, which failed fairly soon after commissioning and is no longer being maintained. The Southern California Gas Co. (The Gas Company) is also testing the practicality of solar thermal cooling systems at their Energy Resource Center (ERC) in Downey, California. Solar Collectors from Sopogy and Cogenra were installed on the rooftop at the ERC and are producing cooling for the building's air conditioning system. Masdar City in the United Arab Emirates is also testing a double-effect absorption cooling plant using Sopogy parabolic trough collectors, Mirroxx Fresnel array and TVP Solar high-vacuum solar thermal panels.

A FedEx Ground sorting facility in Davenport, Florida uses a solar thermal air conditioning system to feed cool air into truck trailers parked at loading doors.

For 150 years, absorption chillers have been used to make ice (before the electric light bulbs were invented). This ice can be stored and used as an "ice battery" for cooling when the sun is not shining, as it was in the 1995 Hotel New Otani Tokyo in Japan. Mathematical models are available in the public domain for ice-based thermal energy storage performance calculations.

The ISAAC Solar Icemaker is an intermittent solar ammonia-water absorption cycle. The ISAAC uses a parabolic trough solar collector with a compact and efficient design to produce ice with no fuel or electric input, as well as with no moving parts.

== Solar cooling systems utilizing concentrating collectors ==
The main reasons for employing concentrating collectors in solar cooling systems are: high efficient air-conditioning through coupling with double/triple effect chillers; and solar refrigeration serving industrial end-users, possibly in combination with process heat and steam.

Concerning industrial applications, several studies in the recent years highlighted that there is a high potential for refrigeration (temperatures below 0 °C) in different areas of the globe (e.g., the Mediterranean, Central America). However, this can be achieved by ammonia/ water absorption chillers requiring high temperature heat input at the generator, in a range (120 ÷ 180 °C) which can only be satisfied by concentrating solar collectors. Moreover, several industrial applications require both cooling and steam for processes, and concentrating solar collectors can be very advantageous in the sense that their use is maximized.

== Zero-energy buildings ==
Goals of zero-energy buildings include sustainable, green building technologies that can significantly reduce, or eliminate, net annual energy bills. The supreme achievement is the totally off-the-grid autonomous building that does not have to be connected to utility companies. In hot climates with significant degree days of cooling requirement, leading-edge solar air conditioning will be an increasingly important critical success factor.

== See also ==
- Passive house
- Passive solar building design
- Solar powered refrigerator
