= Ground-coupled heat exchanger =

Underground heat exchanger loop that can capture or dissipate heat to or from the ground

A qanat and windcatcher used as an earth duct, for both earth coupling and evaporative cooling. No fan is needed; the suction in the lee of the windtower draws the air up and out.

A ground-coupled heat exchanger is an underground heat exchanger that can capture heat from and/or dissipate heat to the ground. They use the Earth's near constant subterranean temperature to warm or cool air or other fluids for residential, agricultural or industrial uses. If building air is blown through the heat exchanger for heat recovery ventilation, they are called earth tubes (or Canadian well, Provençal well, Solar chimney, also termed earth cooling tubes, earth warming tubes, earth-air heat exchangers (EAHE or EAHX), air-to-soil heat exchanger, earth channels, earth canals, earth-air tunnel systems, ground tube heat exchanger, hypocausts, subsoil heat exchangers, thermal labyrinths, underground air pipes, and others).

Earth tubes are often a viable and economical alternative or supplement to conventional central heating or air conditioning systems since there are no compressors, chemicals or burners and only blowers are required to move the air. These are used for either partial or full cooling and/or heating of facility ventilation air. Their use can help buildings meet Passive House standards or LEED certification.

Earth-air heat exchangers have been used in agricultural facilities (animal buildings) and horticultural facilities (greenhouses) in the United States of America over the past several decades and have been used in conjunction with solar chimneys in hot arid areas for thousands of years, probably beginning in the Persian Empire. Implementation of these systems in India as well as in the cooler climates of Austria, Denmark and Germany to preheat the air for home ventilation systems has become fairly common since the mid-1990s, and is slowly being adopted in North America.

Ground-coupled heat exchangers may also use water or antifreeze as a heat transfer fluid, often in conjunction with a geothermal heat pump, for example in downhole heat exchangers.

== Passive designs ==
Passive ground-coupled heat exchange is a common traditional technique. It drives circulation using pressure differences caused by wind, rain, and buoyancy-driven convection (from selectively engineering areas of solar heating and evaporative, radiative, or conductive cooling).

== Design ==
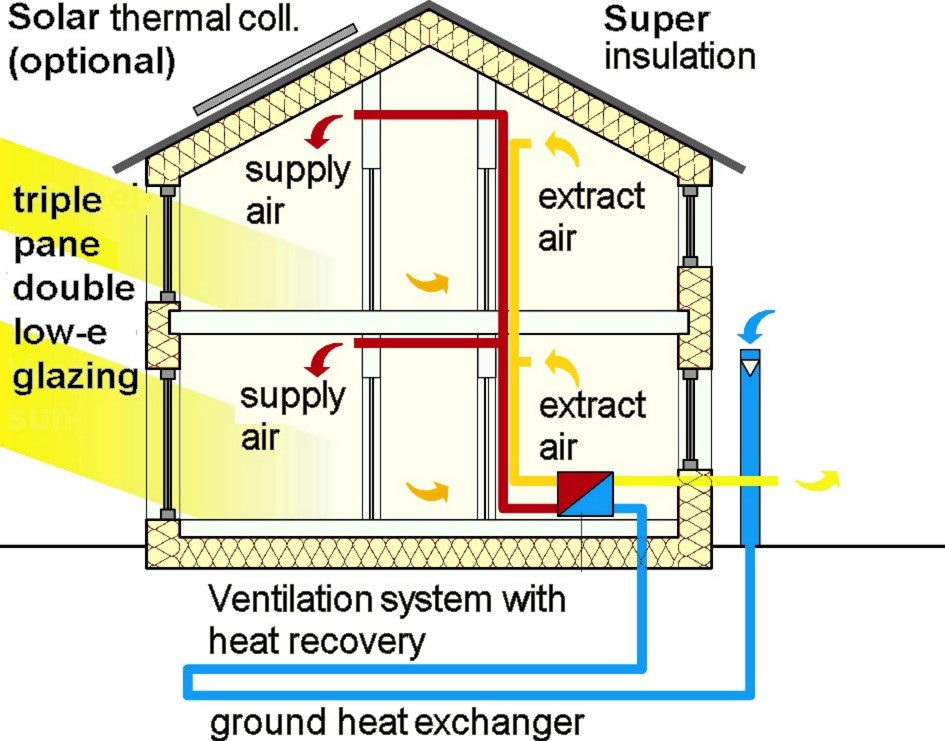
Heat recovery ventilation, often including an earth-to-air heat exchanger, is essential to achieve the German passivhaus standard.

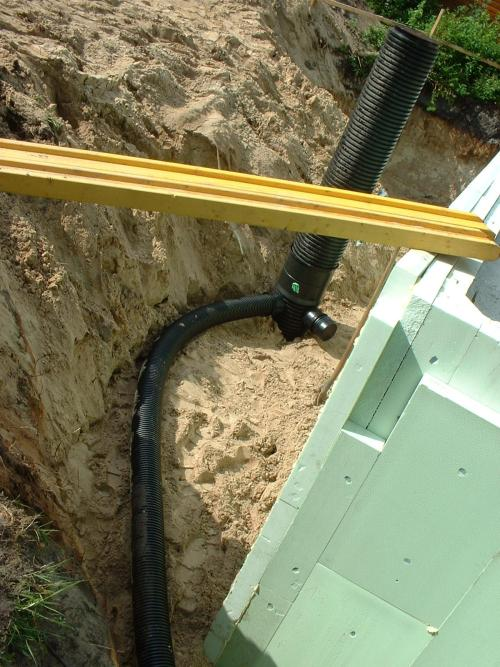
Earth pipe before being covered with soil

Earth-air heat exchangers can be analyzed for performance with several software applications using weather gage data. These software applications include GAEA, AWADUKT Thermo, EnergyPlus, L-EWTSim, WKM, and others. However, numerous earth-air heat exchanger systems have been designed and constructed improperly, and failed to meet design expectations. Earth-air heat exchangers appear best suited for air pretreatment rather than for full heating or cooling. Pretreatment of air for an air source heat pump or ground-source heat pump often provides the best economic return on investment, with simple payback often achieved within one year after installation.

Most systems are usually constructed from 100 to 600 mm (3.9 to 23.6 in) diameter, smooth-walled (so they do not easily trap condensation moisture and mold), rigid or semi-rigid plastic, plastic-coated metal pipes or plastic pipes coated with inner antimicrobial layers, buried 1.5 to 3 m (4.9 to 9.8 ft) underground where the ambient earth temperature is typically 10 to 23 °C (50 to 73 °F) all year round in the temperate latitudes where most humans live. Ground temperature becomes more stable with depth. Smaller diameter tubes require more energy to move the air and have less earth contact surface area. Larger tubes permit a slower airflow, which also yields more efficient energy transfer and permits much higher volumes to be transferred, permitting more air exchanges in a shorter time period, when, for example, you want to clear the building of objectionable odors or smoke but suffer from poorer heat transfer from the pipe wall to the air due to increased distances.

Some consider that it is more efficient to pull air through a long tube than to push it with a fan. A solar chimney can use natural convection (warm air rising) to create a vacuum to draw filtered passive cooling tube air through the largest diameter cooling tubes. Natural convection may be slower than using a solar-powered fan. Sharp 90-degree angles should be avoided in the construction of the tube – two 45-degree bends produce less-turbulent, more efficient air flow. While smooth-wall tubes are more efficient in moving the air, they are less efficient in transferring energy.

There are three configurations, a closed loop design, an open 'fresh air' system or a combination:

- Closed loop system: Air from inside the home or structure is blown through a U-shaped loop of typically 30 to 150 m (98 to 492 ft) of tube(s) where it is moderated to near earth temperature before returning to be distributed via ductwork throughout the home or structure. The closed loop system can be more effective cooling the air (during air temperature extremes) than an open system, since it cools and recools the same air.
- Open system: Outside air is drawn from a filtered air intake (Minimum Efficiency Reporting Value MERV 8+ air filter is recommended) to cool or preheat the air. The tubes are typically 30 m (98 ft) long straight tubes into the home. An open system combined with energy recovery ventilation can be nearly as efficient (80-95%) as a closed loop, and ensures that entering fresh air is filtered and tempered.
- Combination system: This can be constructed with dampers that allow either closed or open operation, depending on fresh air ventilation requirements. Such a design, even in closed loop mode, could draw a quantity of fresh air when an air pressure drop is created by a solar chimney, clothes dryer, fireplace, kitchen or bathroom exhaust vents. It is better to draw in filtered passive cooling tube air than unconditioned outside air.

Single-pass earth air heat exchangers offer the potential for indoor air quality improvement over conventional systems by providing an increased supply of outdoor air. In some configurations of single-pass systems, a continuous supply of outdoor air is provided. This type of system would usually include one or more ventilation heat recovery units.

=== Shared Ground Arrays ===
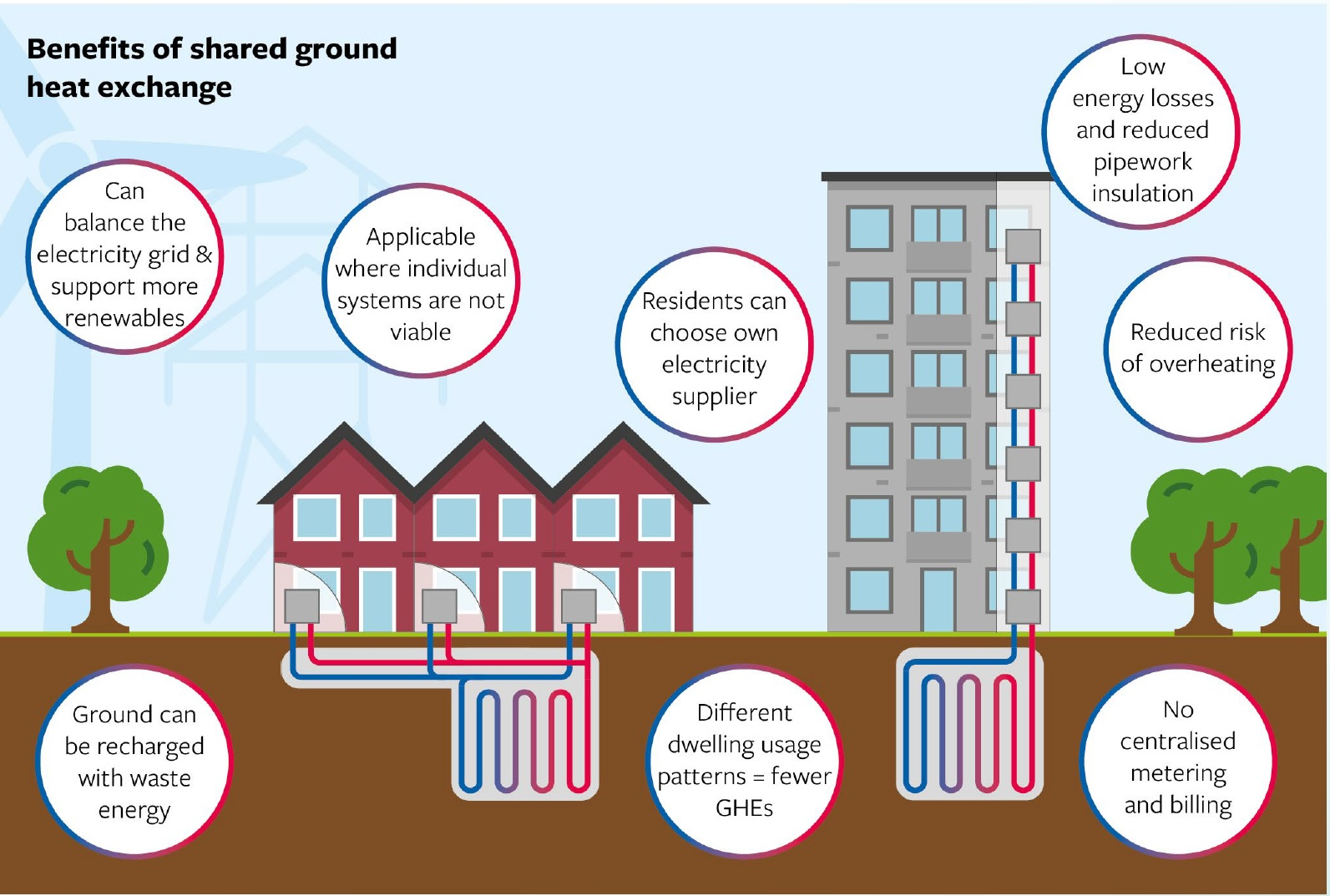
Potential benefits associated with shared ground heat exchange

A shared ground array comprises connected ground heat exchangers for use by more than one home. They can deliver low-carbon heating where individual ground-coupled heat exchangers are not viable, such as in terraced housing with little outside space. They can also provide opportunities to decarbonise heating for groups of homes away from dense urban centres where traditional district heating is unlikely to be economically viable. Other benefits include higher efficiency and lower capital cost, greater resident control to choose their own electricity supplier, and reduction in the number of exchangers required due to the variance in peak load times between different households.

=== Thermal Labyrinths ===
A thermal labyrinth performs the same function as an earth tube, but they are usually formed from a larger volume rectilinear space, sometimes incorporated into building basements or under ground floors, and which are in turn divided by numerous internal walls to form a labyrinthine air path. Maximising the length of the air path ensures a better heat transfer effect. The construction of the labyrinth walls, floors, and dividing walls is normally of high thermal mass cast concrete and concrete block, with the exterior walls and floors in direct contact with the surrounding earth.

== Safety ==
If humidity and associated mold colonization is not addressed in system design, occupants may face health risks. At some sites, the humidity in the earth tubes may be controlled simply by passive drainage if the water table is sufficiently deep and the soil has relatively high permeability. In situations where passive drainage is not feasible or needs to be augmented for further moisture reduction, active (dehumidifier) or passive (desiccant) systems may treat the air stream.

Formal research indicates that earth-air heat exchangers reduce building ventilation air pollution. Rabindra (2004) states, “The tunnel [earth-Air heat exchanger] is found not to support the growth of bacteria and fungi; rather it is found to reduce the quantity of bacteria and fungi thus making the air safer for humans to inhale. It is therefore clear that the use of EAT [Earth Air Tunnel] not only helps save the energy but also helps reduce the air pollution by reducing bacteria and fungi.” Likewise, Flueckiger (1999) in a study of twelve earth-air heat exchangers varying in design, pipe material, size and age, stated, “This study was performed because of concerns of potential microbial growth in the buried pipes of ground-coupled air systems. The results however demonstrate, that no harmful growth occurs and that the airborne concentrations of viable spores and bacteria, with few exceptions, even decreases after passage through the pipe-system”, and further stated, “Based on these investigations the operation of ground-coupled earth-to-air heat exchangers is acceptable as long as regular controls are undertaken and if appropriate cleaning facilities are available”.

Whether using earth tubes with or without antimicrobial material, it is extremely important that the underground cooling tubes have an excellent condensation drain and be installed at a 2-3 degree grade to ensure the constant removal of condensed water from the tubes. When implementing in a house without a basement on a flat lot, an external condensation tower can be installed at a depth lower than where the tube enters into the house and at a point close to the wall entry. The condensation tower installation requires the added use of a condensate pump in which to remove the water from the tower. For installations in houses with basements, the pipes are graded so that the condensation drain located within the house is at the lowest point. In either installation, the tube must continually slope towards either the condensation tower or the condensation drain. The inner surface of the tube, including all joints must be smooth to aid in the flow and removal of condensate. Corrugated or ribbed tubes and rough interior joints must not be used. Joints connecting the tubes together must be tight enough to prevent water or gas infiltration. In certain geographic areas, it is important that the joints prevent Radon gas infiltration. Porous materials like uncoated concrete tubes cannot be used. Ideally, Earth Tubes with antimicrobial inner layers should be used in installations to inhibit the potential growth of molds and bacteria within the tubes.

== Effectiveness ==
Implementations of earth-air heat exchangers for either partial or full cooling and/or heating of facility ventilation air have had mixed success. The literature is, unfortunately, well populated with over-generalizations about the applicability of these systems – both in favor of, and against. A key aspect of earth-air heat exchangers is the passive nature of operation and consideration of the wide variability of conditions in natural systems.

Earth-air heat exchangers can be very cost effective in both up-front/capital costs as well as long-term operation and maintenance costs. However, this varies widely depending on the location’s latitude, altitude, ambient Earth temperature, climatic temperature-and-relative-humidity extremes, solar radiation, water table, soil type (thermal conductivity), soil moisture content and the efficiency of the building's exterior envelope design / insulation. Generally, dry-and-low-density soil with little or no ground shade will yield the least benefit, while dense damp soil with considerable shade should perform well. A slow drip watering system may improve thermal performance. Damp soil in contact with the cooling tube conducts heat more efficiently than dry soil.

Earth cooling tubes are much less effective in hot humid climates (like Florida) where the ambient temperature of the earth approaches human comfort temperature. The higher the ambient temperature of the earth, the less effective it is for cooling and dehumidification. However, the earth can be used to partially cool and dehumidify the replacement fresh air intake for passive-solar thermal buffer zone areas like the laundry room, or a solarium / greenhouse, especially those with a hot tub, swim spa, or indoor swimming pool, where warm humid air is exhausted in the summer, and a supply of cooler drier replacement air is desired.

Not all regions and sites are suitable for earth-air heat exchangers. Conditions which may hinder or preclude proper implementation include shallow bedrock, high water table, and insufficient space, among others. In some areas, only cooling or heating may be afforded by earth-air heat exchangers. In these areas, provision for thermal recharge of the ground must especially be considered. In dual function systems (both heating and cooling), the warm season provides ground thermal recharge for the cool season and the cool season provides ground thermal recharge for the warm season, though overtaxing the thermal reservoir must be considered even with dual function systems.

== Environmental impact ==
In the context of today's diminishing fossil fuel reserves, increasing electrical costs, air pollution and global warming, properly designed earth cooling tubes offer a sustainable alternative to reduce or eliminate the need for conventional compressor-based air conditioning systems, in non-tropical climates. They can also help to balance the electricity grid to support fluctuating supply from other renewable energy sources. They also provide the added benefit of controlled, filtered, temperate fresh air intake, which is especially valuable in tight, well-weatherized, efficient building envelopes.

== Water to earth ==
An alternative to the earth-to-air heat exchanger is the "water" to earth heat exchanger. This is typically similar to a geothermal heat pump tubing embedded horizontally in the soil (or could be a vertical sonde) to a similar depth of the earth-air heat exchanger. It uses approximately double the length of pipe of 35 mm diameter, e.g., around 80 m compared to an EAHX of 40 m. A heat exchanger coil is placed before the air inlet of the heat recovery ventilator. Typically a brine liquid (heavily salted water) is used as the heat exchanger fluid.

Many European installations are now using this setup due to the ease of installation. No fall or drainage point is required and it is safe because of the reduced risk from mold.

== See also ==
- Ab anbar
- Aquifer thermal energy storage
- Cistern
- Earth sheltering
- Geothermal heat pump
- Geothermal power
- HVAC
- Passive cooling
- Qanat
- Renewable energy
- Seasonal thermal energy storage
- Solar air conditioning
- Solar chimney
- Stepwell
- Windcatcher
- Yakhchāl
