= History of passive solar building design =

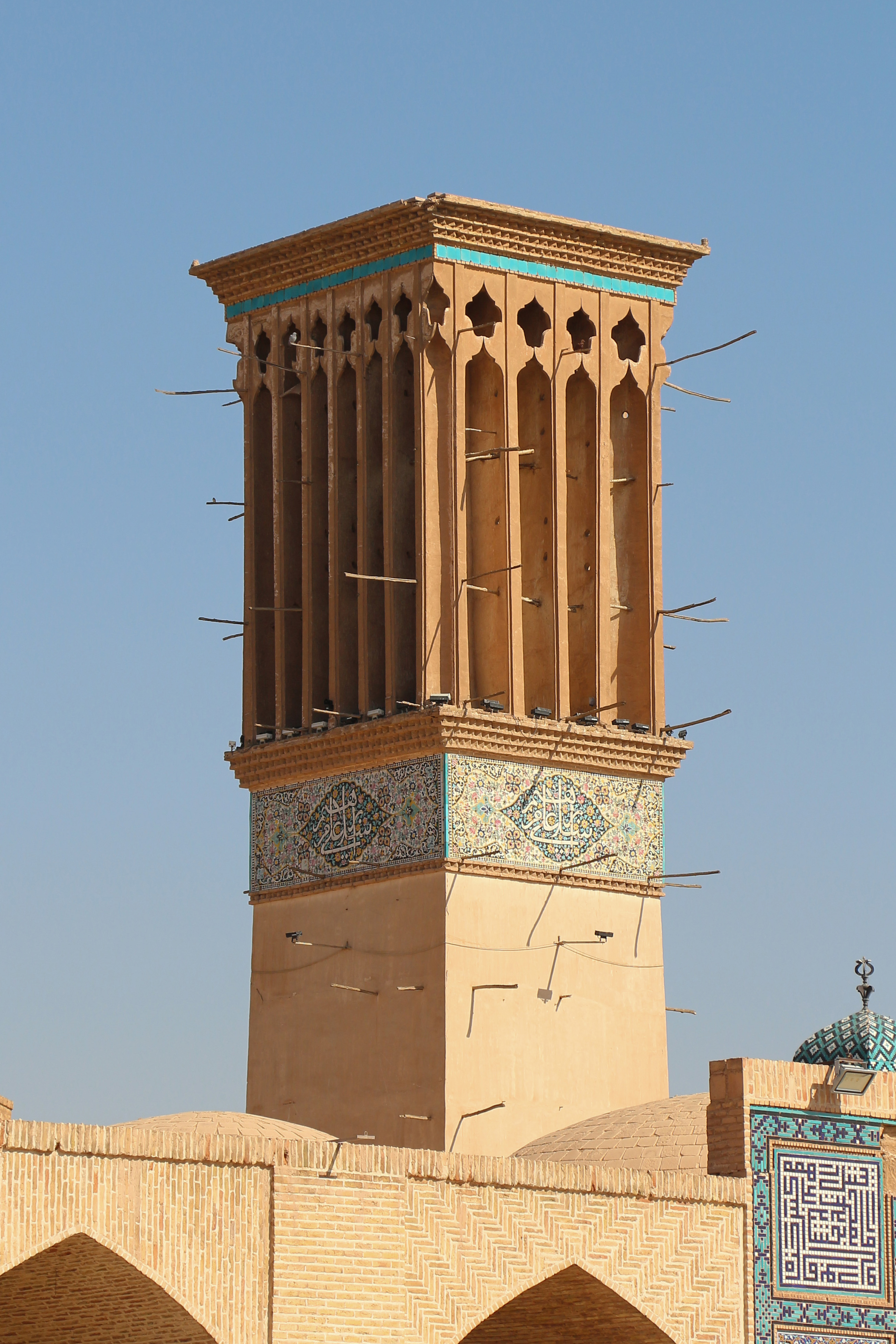
Windcatcher at Ganjali Khan Complex, Kerman

The passive solar design of buildings includes consideration of their orientation to the sun and their thermal mass, factors which have been incorporated to a greater or lesser extent in vernacular architecture for thousands of years. Ancient Greeks, Romans, and Chinese were the first to refine and develop the basic principles of passive solar design, but European technological advances were largely abandoned after the Fall of Rome. It was not until the 20th century that interest in the principles of passive solar design had a resurgence in Europe and the US, with architects such as George F. Keck and Frank Lloyd Wright. In the 21st century, worldwide endeavours to reduce power consumption have kept the interest in passive solar technology alive.

== Pre-modern history ==
External videos
- Iranian city uses ancient techniques to defy summer heat - AFP . Iranian city uses ancient techniques to defy summer heat - AFP

The techniques of passive solar building design were practiced for thousands of years, by necessity, before the advent of mechanical heating and cooling. It has remained a traditional part of vernacular architecture in many countries. There is evidence that ancient cultures considered factors such as solar orientation, thermal mass and ventilation in the construction of residential dwellings. Fully developed solar architecture and urban planning methods were first employed by the Greeks and Chinese who oriented their buildings toward the south to provide light and warmth. Nearly two and a half millennia ago, the ancient Greek philosopher Aeschylus wrote: "Only primitives & barbarians lack knowledge of houses turned to face the Winter sun." Similarly, Socrates said: "Now, supposing a house to have a southern aspect, sunshine during winter will steal in under the verandah, but in summer, when the sun traverses a path right over our heads, the roof will afford an agreeable shade, will it not?" Roman bathhouses had large south facing windows. Solar design was largely abandoned in Europe after the Fall of Rome but continued unabated in China where cosmological traditions associate the south with summer, warmth and health.

== Modern history ==
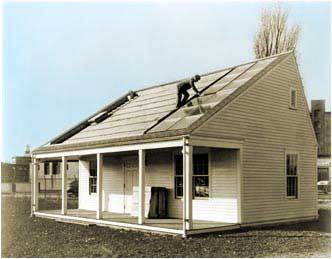
MIT's 1939 Solar House #1

Although earlier experimental solar houses were constructed using a mixture of active and passive solar techniques, some of the first European engineered passive solar houses of the modern era were built in Germany after World War I, when the Allies occupied the Ruhr area, including most of Germany's coal mines.

Architect George F. Keck was a pioneering designer of passive solar houses in the 1930s and 40s. He designed the all-glass "House of Tomorrow" for the 1933 Century of Progress Exposition in Chicago and noted that it was warm inside on sunny winter days prior to the installation of the furnace. Following this he gradually started incorporating more south-facing windows into his designs for other clients, and in 1940 designed a passive solar home for real estate developer Howard Sloan in Glenview, Illinois. The Sloan House was called a "solar house" by the Chicago Tribune, the first modern use of that term. Sloan then built a number of passive solar houses, and his publicity efforts contributed to a significant "solar house" movement in the 1940s.

Frank Lloyd Wright used passive solar principles in some of his designs, most notably in the Jacobs House, built in 1944 in Wisconsin, which was also known as the "Solar Hemicycle" or "Solar Hemicyclo." Others continued to experiment with passive solar techniques. In 1958, Wendell Thomas, a professor with no architectural training, built "Sunnycave" in Celo Community in the mountains of North Carolina. His "moderately solar" house was south facing and earth-bermed on the North and West sides. He complemented the basic solar design by building a slot between the floor and wall on all four sides that drained cold air from the walls down to a deep, completely dry, sealed crawl space where the air warmed to earth temperature. The cold air drainage slot acted like a return register of a hot air furnace system, but he eliminated the registers and the clumsy conduits leading to the furnace by having the whole house circulate air like a passive furnace, fueled with a small woodstove in its center.

In the United States, interest in passive solar building design was significantly stimulated by the 1973 oil crisis. Dozens of pattern books were published in this period, including the Passive Solar Energy Book by Edward Mazria. In 1977, the U.S. Department of Energy was created, and in 1978 Solar Energy Tax credits were provided. In 1979, President Carter installed solar panels on the roof of the White House.

== Contemporary developments ==
Passive solar technologies were incrementally refined and greatly improved during the 20th century, boosted by the motivation of (and aided by) the development of 3D computer modelling techniques.

At the start of the 21st century, passive solar building design has received greater interest. U.S. Solar Energy Tax Credits were reinstated in 2005, and the 2007 Energy Bill provided more funding for solar energy research and solar air conditioning.

The U.S. Department of Energy's 2007 "Thermal Performance of the Exterior Envelopes of Whole Buildings International Conference" presented a comprehensive workshop on "Three Decades of Passive Solar Heating and Cooling Lessons Learned"

Since 1978, roughly 300,000 U.S. buildings have demonstrated at least some passive solar design features (although over 25 million U.S. buildings have been constructed since then without using these techniques). For three decades (since the 1978 U.S. Solar Energy Tax Credits), a 70%–90% energy consumption reduction has been demonstrated in experimental passive solar and near zero energy buildings."Side By Side Comparison"

In recent years, the U.S. Department of Energy's Solar Decathlon has showcased some advanced creative designs, using both passive and active solar systems, by architecture and engineering student teams from around the world.

== See also ==
- List of pioneering solar buildings
- Passive solar building design
