= Passive house =

High-performance energy-efficiency building standard

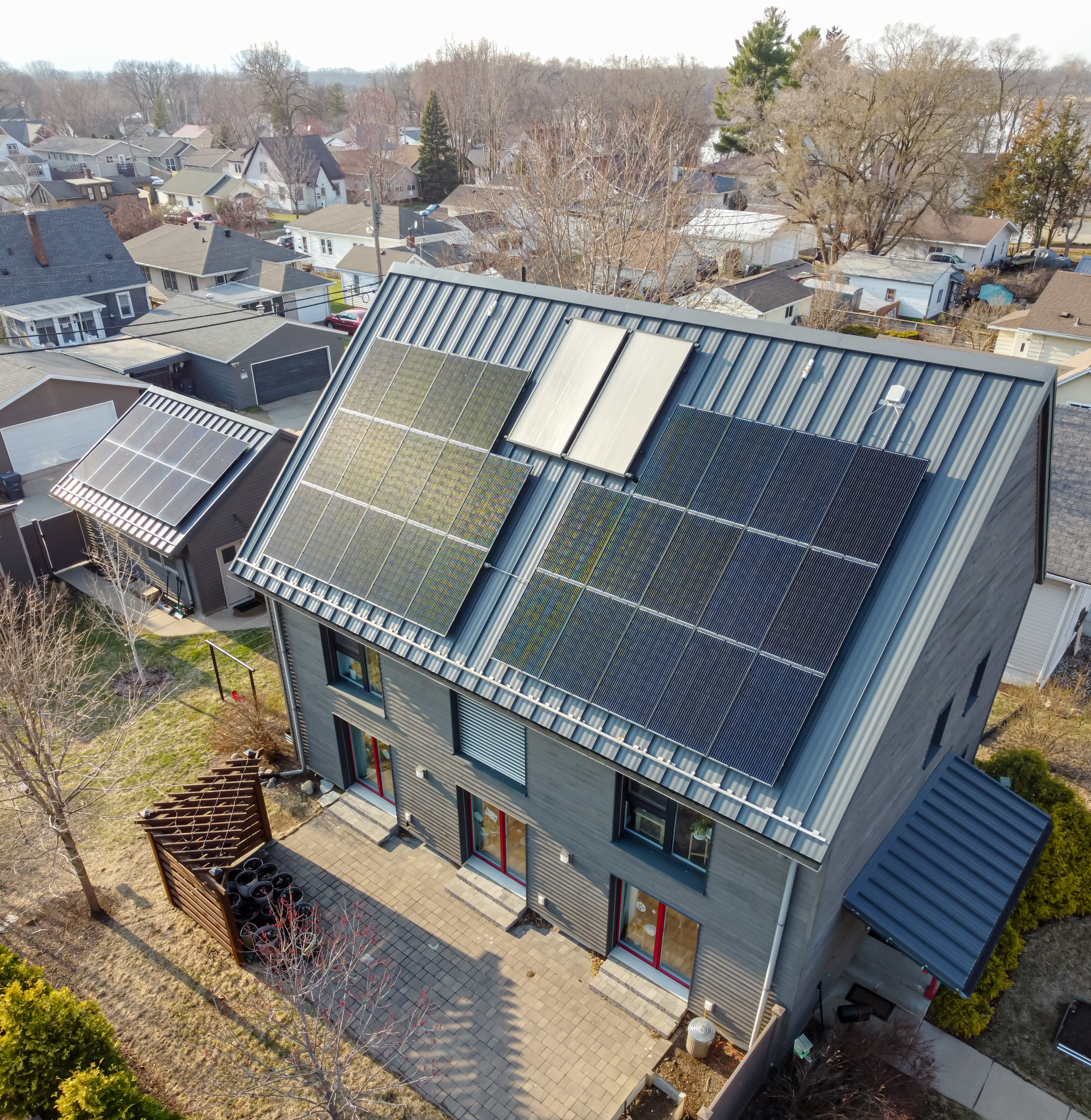
Passive house developed by Western Technical College in La Crosse, Wisconsin

Passive house or Passivhaus is a voluntary building performance standard designed to have high energy efficiency and thermal comfort while substantially reduces a building’s carbon footprint. Buildings certified to the standard are ultra-low energy and typically require very little energy for space heating or cooling. The approach is used for housing and for non-residential buildings such as offices, schools, kindergartens and healthcare facilities. Energy efficiency is integral to architectural design rather than an add-on. Although most common in new construction, the principles are also applied in deep renovations.

As of January 2025, projects certified by the Passive House Institute (PHI) comprise over 47,400 units with about 4.32 million m^{2} (46.5 million sq ft) of treated floor area (TFA) worldwide; the public PHI database lists nearly 6,000 projects. In North America, the Passive House Institute US (PHIUS) reported over 500 certified projects in total and around 1.6 million sq ft (150,000 m^{2}) certified in 2024 alone, with 4.4 million sq ft (410,000 m^{2}) design-certified that year. While early adoption concentrated in German-speaking countries and Scandinavia, certified projects are now documented across diverse climate zones, including hot-humid and tropical regions.

== History ==
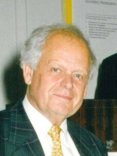
Bo Adamson, co-originator of the passive house concept

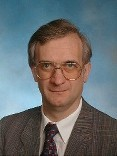
Wolfgang Feist, co-originator and founder of the Passivhaus-Institut (PHI) in Germany

The term passive house was originally used in the 1970s for buildings emphasizing passive solar strategies. Since the 1990s, the term has instead referred to buildings that meeting specific quantified PHI certification criteria (space conditioning, primary energy, airtightness and comfort requirements). The standard originated from a 1988 discussion between Bo Adamson (Lund University) and Wolfgang Feist (then at the Institute for Housing and Environment, Darmstadt), followed by research supported by the state of Hesse. Passive solar strategies are not required, although they often form part of the approach to meet the certification criteria.

North American “superinsulation” pioneers of the 1970s (e.g., the Saskatchewan Conservation House and the Leger House) provided important technical precedents, including heat-recovery ventilation and airtightness testing.

=== Examples ===
Four terraced houses in Darmstadt-Kranichstein (1990–1991) are widely cited as the first built to what became the Passive House standard.

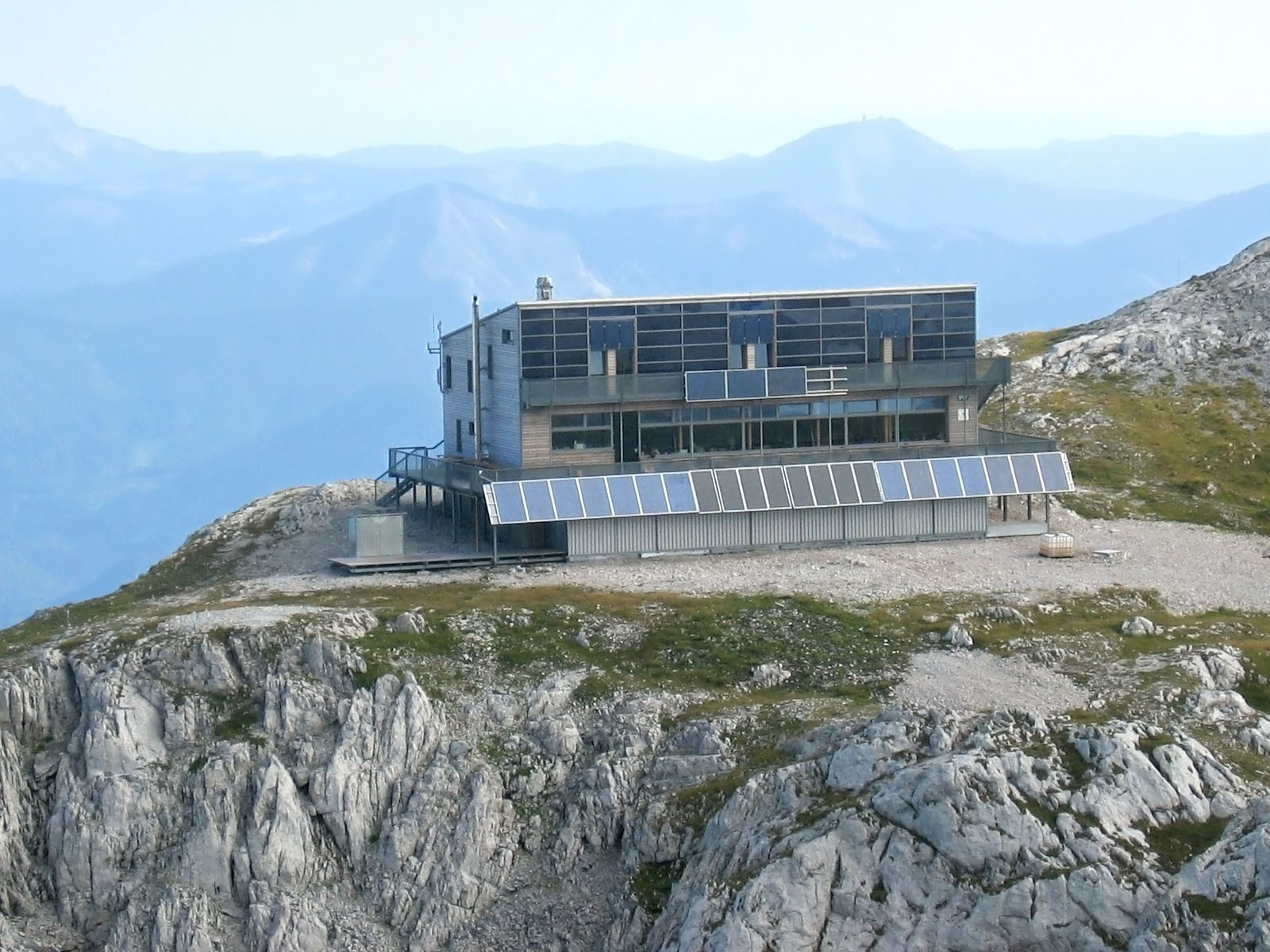
The Schiestlhaus (Austria, 2005), first high-alpine passive house

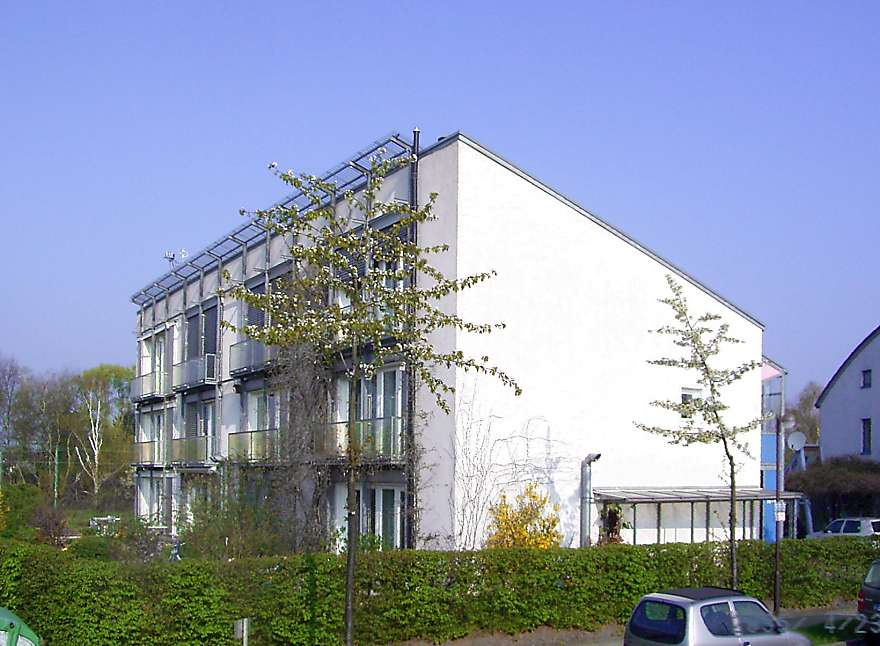
A passive house building in Darmstadt, Germany

The Passivhaus-Institut (PHI) was founded in 1996 in Darmstadt to develop, promote and certify buildings under to the standard. By 2010 it was estimated that over 25,000 Passive House buildings existed worldwide.

The standard has since been applied to-large scale developments. Gaobeidian, China, hosts what is reported as the world’s largest Passive House development (Railway City), with several hundred thousand m² of certified area built in phases since 2019. The 88-metre (289 ft) tower in Bilbao, Spain (2018), is the world's tallest certified Passive House building.

In the UK health sector, the Passivhaus-certified Foleshill Health Centre (Coventry, opened 2021) demonstrated substantial energy savings in operation and a replicable delivery model for NHS facilities.

In the United States, Katrin Klingenberg’s 2003 “Smith House” (Urbana, IL) contributed to the development of the movement that led to the creation of PHIUS (2007). PHIUS has since certified hundreds of projects; New York City’s Park Avenue Green (2019) was recognized as North America’s largest Passive House affordable housing project at the time.

More recent examples within the United States can be seen in projects such as the Gallatin Passive House built in 2020 by North River Architecture and Planning in Gallatin, New York. The Sonoran Desert Passive in Tucson, Arizona which was designed by Brubaker Architects and received its final certification in 2021. Another example of a passive addition (rather than completely new build or renovation) can be found in the Theresa Passive House designed by Studio Ferme, in Austin, Texas; the project completed construction in 2020 and received it's final certification in 2022.

== Standards ==
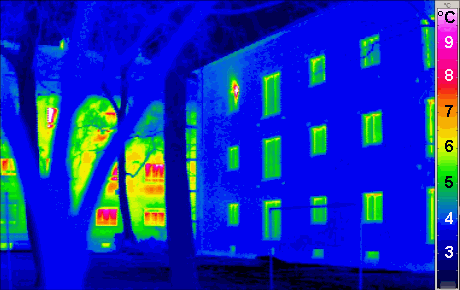
Thermogram: Passive house (right) vs. conventional building (left)

While techniques such as superinsulation predate the standard, Passive House (PHI) specifies quantitative performance criteria and quality assurance. Key requirements include:

- Annual space heating (and, in suitable climates, cooling) demand ≤ 15 kWh/m^{2}/a (0.0047 MJ/sq ft/sq ft) or peak heat load ≤ 10 W/m^{2} (0.0012 hp/sq ft), as calculated with the Passive House Planning Package (PHPP), using local climate data.
- Airtightness: n_{50} ≤ 0.6 h⁻¹ at ±50 Pa, measured via a blower-door test.
- Efficient mechanical ventilation with heat recovery (typically ≥75% sensible efficiency).
- Whole-building primary energy/renewable energy limits as defined by PHI (see PHI documentation).

=== Passive House Standards in North America ===
Two related but distinct Passive House certification systems are used in North America:

- PHI (Darmstadt): the original international Passive House standard and certification system using PHPP and PHI quality assurance.
- PHIUS+ (Chicago): climate-specific performance targets (CORE/ZERO/REVIVE families) with on-site QA/QC by accredited raters and verifiers; criteria are optimized for carbon and cost within each North American climate zone.

The two programs use different energy models and protocols and certify independently.

== Construction costs ==
Passive House building costs vary by market, building type, and the experience of the construction team. Reported cost premiums for Passive House construction over conventional construction have ranged from ~5–10% in Germany, the UK and the US, with reductions noted as supply chains mature.

The specific drivers of building cost and complexity vary, but relative to basic Code-compliant construction, Passive Houses typically include superinsulation of the envelope, requiring greater thickness and complexity of the wall assembly in particular, and particular attention to air, water, and vapour barriers, including at all penetrations. They also include very high performance window and exterior door systems.

Cost premiums are partially offset by downsized or eliminated conventional heating/cooling systems, and lower operating costs over the building life cycle. Delivery at cost parity with standard code buildings has been demonstrated in some German multifamily projects (e.g., Vauban, Freiburg). High-latitude locations (>60°N) can face higher envelope and glazing costs to meet targets.

Passive House features can also be incorporated into existing buildings through retrofits, although such projects can turn out to be expensive. In the UK an architect incurred a total cost to adapt a small four-bedroom 1960s house of about £80,000, over ten years to spread the cost, without including additional costs for architectural work. The windows cost about £30,000; making the house airtight about £5,000. On a hot day, the temperature inside was about 10°C (18°F) cooler than outside. In winter a single radiator was enough to heat the whole house, with a reduction of 88% in required energy. However, in a heatwave with hot nights, unusual in the UK, the temperature during the day rose to about the night-time ambient temperature. While retrofitting to full passive house standard is expensive, it has been suggested that "even doing the 50% best is massive in terms of energy bills".

== Design and construction ==
Passive house combines envelope performance, airtightness and efficient services.

Core practices include:

- Passive solar design and urban/landscape integration – compact massing, appropriate solar gains, shading, and mitigation of overheating; strategies are adapted to climate, especially in hot-humid regions.
- Superinsulation and thermal-bridge-free detailing (typical opaque U-values ~0.10–0.15 W/m²·K).
- High-performance windows (triple/quad glazing, low-e coatings, inert-gas fills, warm-edge spacers; whole-window U-values often ≤0.80 W/m²·K).
- Airtightness to n_{50} ≤0.6 h⁻¹, verified by blower-door testing; intermediate tests during construction are recommended.
- Balanced mechanical ventilation with heat recovery (typically ≥75% efficiency) for IAQ and energy recovery; earth-tubes may be used with careful moisture control where appropriate.
- Low-load space conditioning – many climates allow heating via tempered ventilation air with small duct heaters or heat-pump coils; peak loads are limited by envelope performance.

== Performance and occupant behaviour ==
Concerns are sometimes raised that occupants must restrict behaviours (e.g., opening windows), but sensitivity analyses indicate performance is generally robust to typical occupant variation.

== International comparisons ==
- United States – Space-heating intensity around 1 British thermal unit per square foot (11 kJ/m^{2}) per heating degree day is typical for PHI Passive House, compared to ~5–15 for code-built homes (2003 MEE Code), representing 75–95% savings. Waldsee BioHaus (Minnesota) follows the German standard and reported ~85% lower energy use than comparable LEED homes.
- United Kingdom – New houses to Passive House standard used ~77% less space-heating energy than homes built under circa-2006 Building Regulations. It was estimated that in 2026 about 1% of new-build housing was built to voluntary passive house standards, a figure expected to increase.
- Ireland – Typical Passive House dwellings consumed ~85% less space-heating energy and cut related CO₂ by ~94% versus 2002 Regulations baselines.

== See also ==
- Energy-plus-house
- Green building
- History of passive solar building design
- Home energy rating
- List of low-energy building techniques
- Low-energy house
- Passive daytime radiative cooling
- Passive solar
- R-2000 program
- Sustainable refurbishment
- Zero heating building
