= Green building in Germany =

German developments that employ green building techniques include:

- The Solarsiedlung (Solar Settlement) in Freiburg, Germany, which features PlusEnergy houses.
- The Sonnenschiff (Sun Ship) in Freiburg, Germany, which is also built according to German solar architect Rolf Disch PlusEnergy standards.
- The Vauban quarter, also in Freiburg.
- Houses designed by Baufritz, incorporating passive solar design, heavily insulated walls, triple-glaze doors and windows, non-toxic paints and finishes, summer shading, heat recovery ventilation, and greywater treatment systems.
- The new Reichstag building in Berlin, which produces its own energy.
- The Heichrich Böll Siedlung in Berlin-Pankow as a forerunner for Green Building in post-cold war Berlin emphasizes on "every day ecology", instead of High-Tech-Measurements.

In January 2009, the first German certificates for sustainable buildings were handed over. The standard for the new certificates is developed by the DGNB (Deutsche Gesellschaft für nachhaltiges Bauen e.V. - German Sustainable Building Council) and the BMVBS (Bundesministeriums für Verkehr, Bau und Stadtentwicklung - Federal Ministry of Transport, Building and Urban Affairs)

== See also ==
- Heliotrope (building)
