= Rolf Disch =

German architect (born 1944)

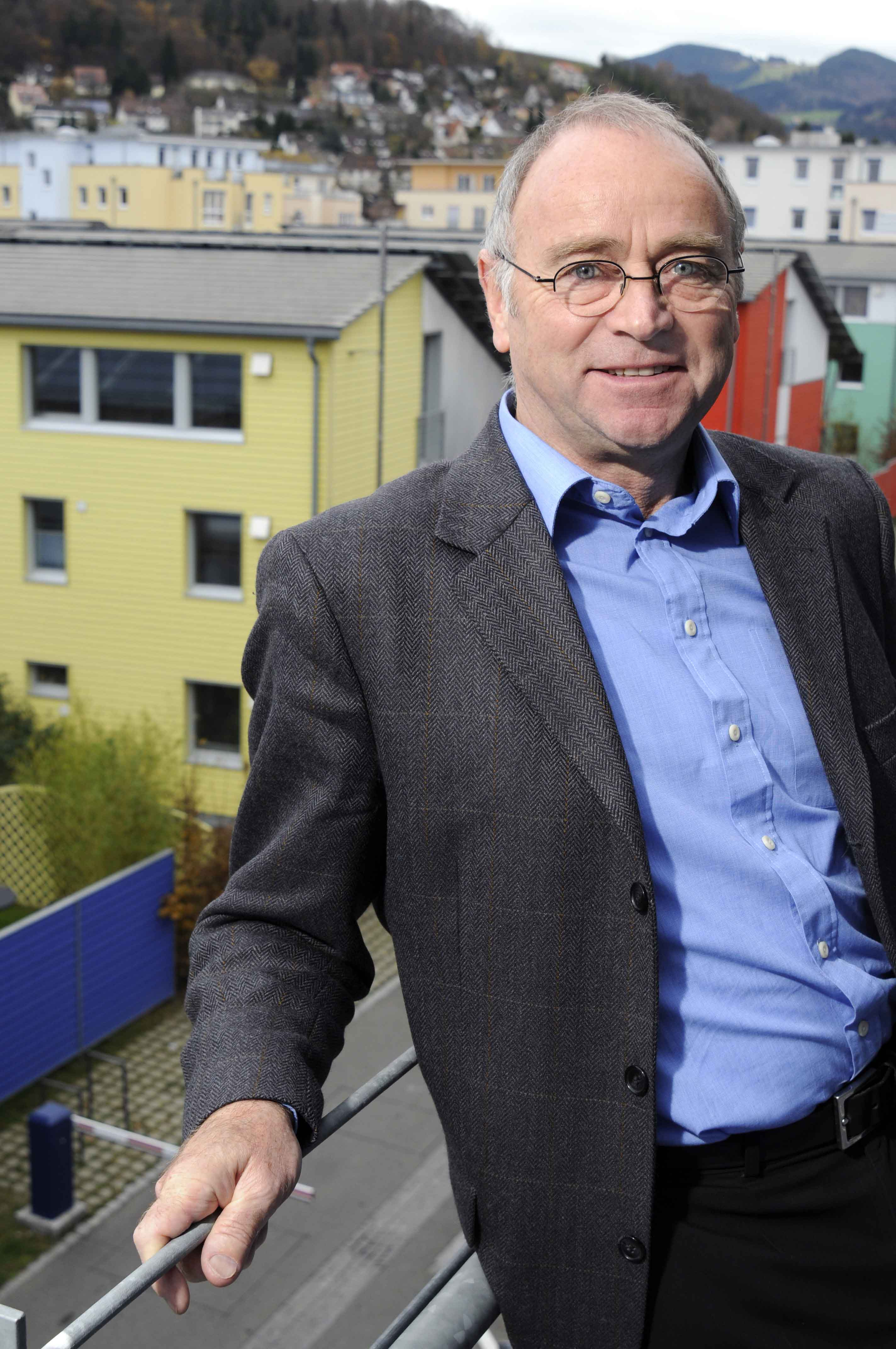
- Born: 1944 (age 81–82); Freiburg im Breisgau, Baden-Württemberg Germany
- Education: Structural Engineering School Freiburg, University of Applied Sciences Konstanz, Guest Professor National School of Design Karlsruhe
- Occupation: Architect
- Awards: 1997 Eco-manager of the Year; 2002 European Solar Prize; 2003 Global Energy Award; 2006 Germany's most beautiful housing community 2008 German Sustainability Award
- Practice: Rolf Disch Solar Architecture
- Buildings: Heliotrope; PlusEnergy; Sun Ship
- Projects: Solar Settlement

Rolf Disch is a German architect, solar energy pioneer and environmental activist. Born in Freiburg im Breisgau, Germany, Disch has dedicated particular focus to regional renewable and sustainable energy.

As head of his own architecture firm, Rolf Disch Solar Architecture, Disch is committed to advancing Germany's incorporation of solar energy generation into residential, retail, and commercial building and design. In 1994, Rolf Disch built the Heliotrope in Freiburg which was the world’s first home to create more energy than it uses, as it physically rotates with the sun to maximize its solar intake. Disch then developed the concept PlusEnergy, simply making it a permanent goal for his buildings to produce more energy than they consume in order to sell the surplus solar energy back into the grid for profit.

Rolf Disch’s biggest venture was completed in 2004 with the 59 PlusEnergy home Solar Settlement and the 60,000 sq ft (5,600 m^{2}). PlusEnergy Sun Ship. In June 2009, Disch launched the 100% GmbH organization, with the aim to make Freiburg and its surrounding district the first 100% sustainable renewable energy region in the world.

== Biography ==
=== Early years ===
Rolf Disch was born in Freiburg im Breisgau, Baden-Württemberg, Germany in 1944. Disch first studied cabinetmaking in 1958 until later switching to masonry in 1961. In 1962 he enrolled at the Structural Engineering School in Freiburg as a structural engineer. Disch knew he was passionate about building, although he found his true heart lied in architecture and after only one year, in 1963, he transferred as an architect to the University of Applied Sciences in Konstanz, Germany. After his graduation in 1967 Disch worked as an architect for two years and established his own firm in 1969, Rolf Disch Solar Architecture.

=== Activism ===
Rolf Disch became an environmental activist during the protest against the construction of a nuclear power plant in Wyhl, Germany. As an educated environmentalist Disch saw this form of energy as destructive, seeking renewable energy as an alternative to achieve sustainable development. The protesters in Wyhl succeeded and the nuclear power plant was never built which fueled the anti-nuclear movement. This success in mind, Disch applied his architectural knowledge to the advancement of renewable and sustainable energy systems in building. The “Disch Design” was a concept he worked on from 1985 to 1988 building solar powered vessels of all sorts. During this period, in 1987, Disch raced a self-designed solar powered automobile in the World Solar Challenge, a race using only solar powered vehicles from Darwin, Australia to Adelaide, Australia. Disch cofounded three organizations promoting the use of renewable energy: Energie in Bürgerhand (Energy in citizens’ hands), 100% GmbH and FESA – Förderverein Energie- und Solaragentur Regio Freiburg (Development association for energy and solar businesses in the Freiburg region). Disch is an active member of the associations Eurosolar, Deutsche Gesellschaft für Sonnenenergie (German society for solar energy), Deutsche Gesellschaft für Nachhaltiges Bauen e.V.(German sustainable building council).

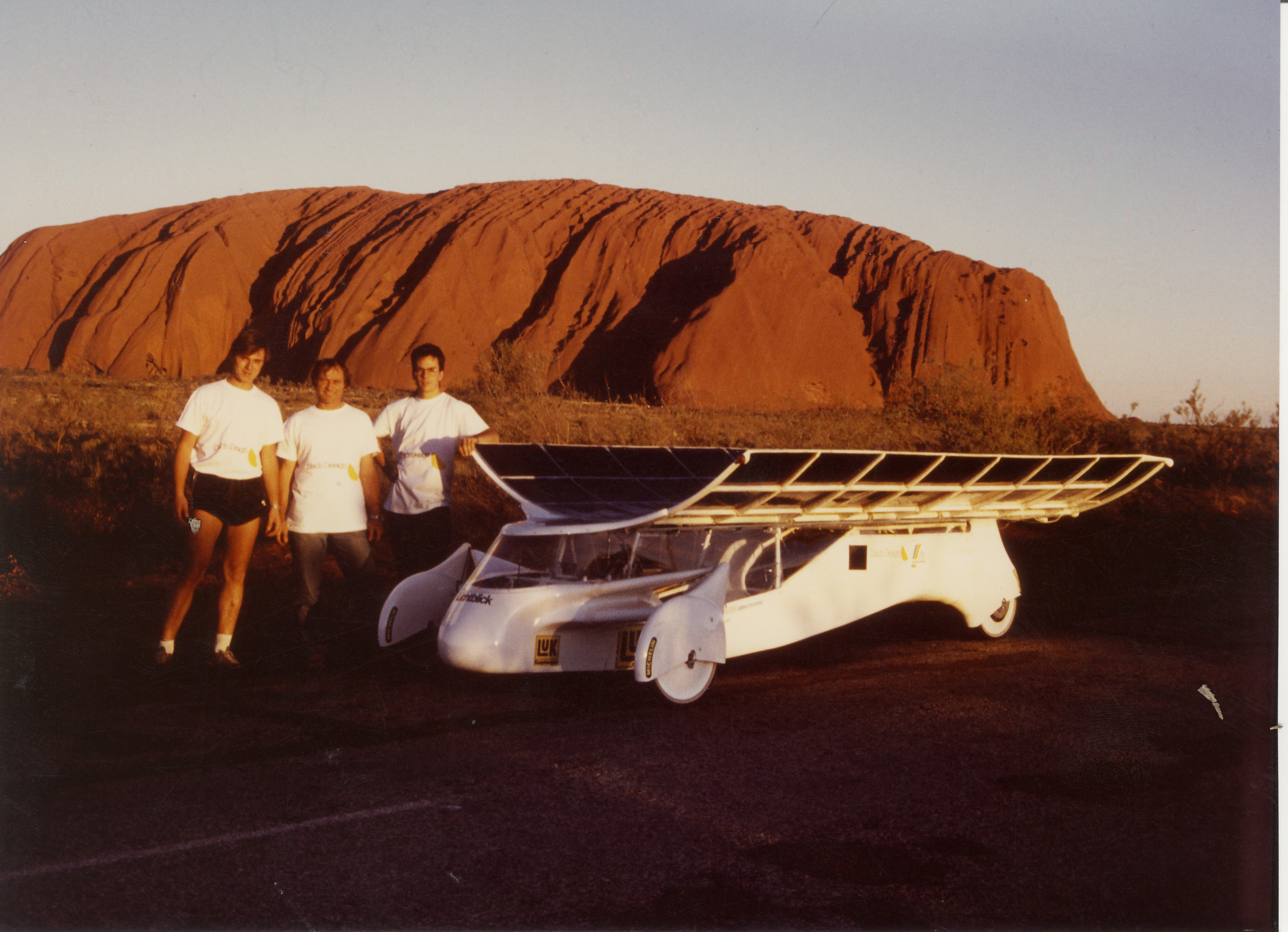
Rolf Disch and his team during the World Solar Challenge race in Australia in 1987.

=== Built with the Sun ===
With a focus on solar power use in his designs, in 1993 Disch started an initiative to make Sport-Club Freiburg the first solar soccer team in Germany with photovoltaic panels to power their stadium. Together with Coach Volker Finke, the Dreisam stadium in Freiburg was the first soccer stadium in Germany to install solar power. In 1995 Disch designed the Heliotrope building, a house that physically rotates with the sun to maximize sunlight and natural heat use. The Heliotrope was the first building worldwide to have a positive energy balance, meaning it generates more energy than it consumes. Different types of renewable and sustainable energy concepts in addition to solar power are used in the original Heliotrope, built in Freiburg’s Vauban quarter. It was the first of three such structures to be built in Germany. After the design of the Heliotrope Disch has been promoting the use of Energy-plus-houses. His practice, Rolf Disch Solar Architecture, is using the brand name PlusEnergy to describe these structures which produce more energy from renewable energy sources, over the course of a year, than they import from external sources. It has designed several such buildings since, including the residential project Solar Settlement.

=== Awards ===
2008 German Sustainability Award
2007—2008 Japanese PEN-Magazine Creativity Award
2006 Germany's most beautiful housing community
2005 Wuppertal Energy and Environment Prize
2003 Global Energy Award
2002 European Solar Prize
2001 Photovoltaic Architecture Prize Baden-Württemberg

== Selected works ==
- Heliotrope, Vauban Quarter Freiburg, 1994
- Heliotrope, Offenburg, 1994
- Heliotrope, Hilpoltstein, 1995
- Solar Settlement, Vauban Quarter Freiburg, 2002
- Sun Ship, Vauban Quarter Freiburg, 2004
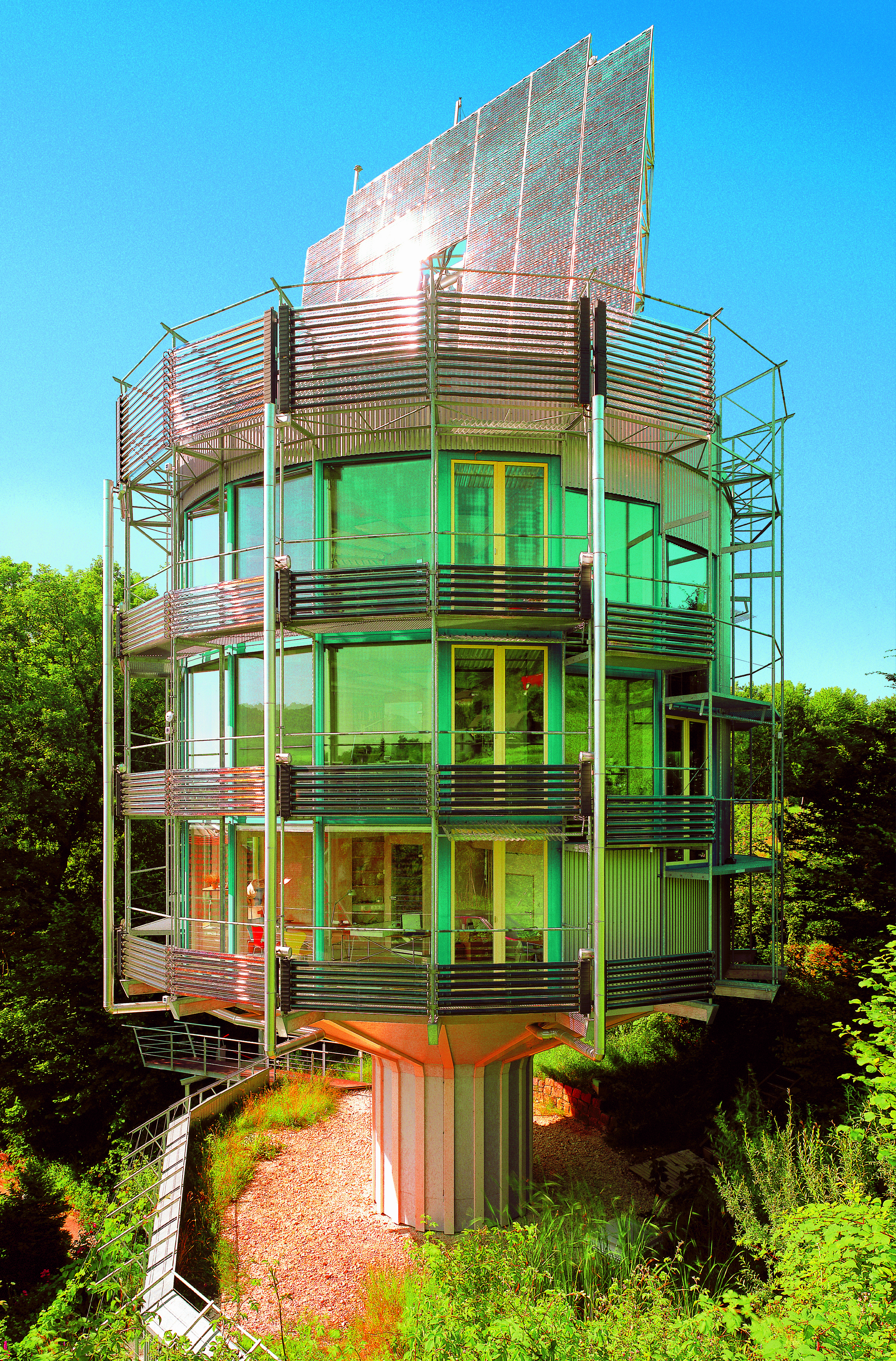
Heliotrope in Vauban Freiburg, 1994

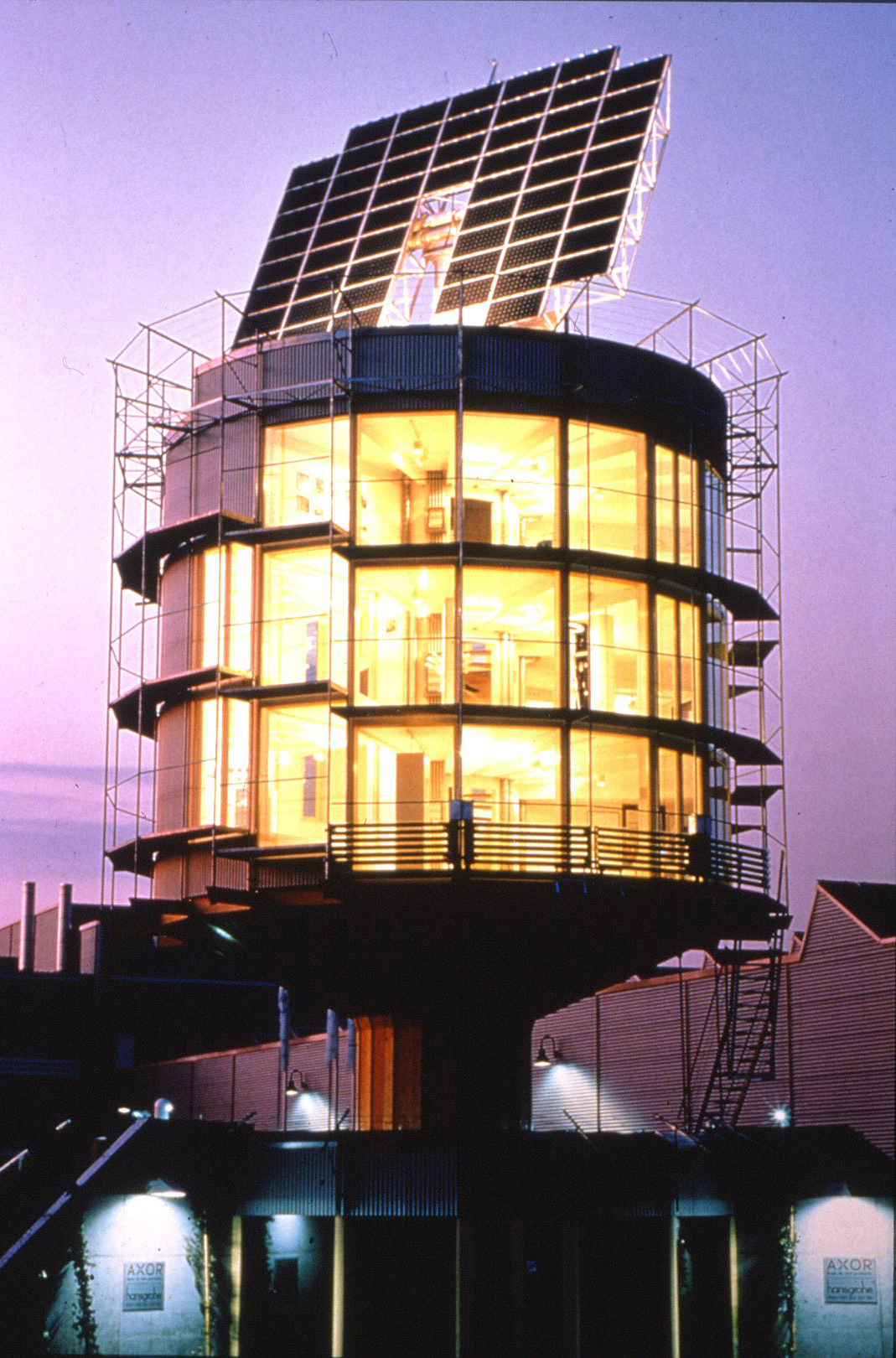
Heliotrope built for Hansgrohe in Offenburg, 1994

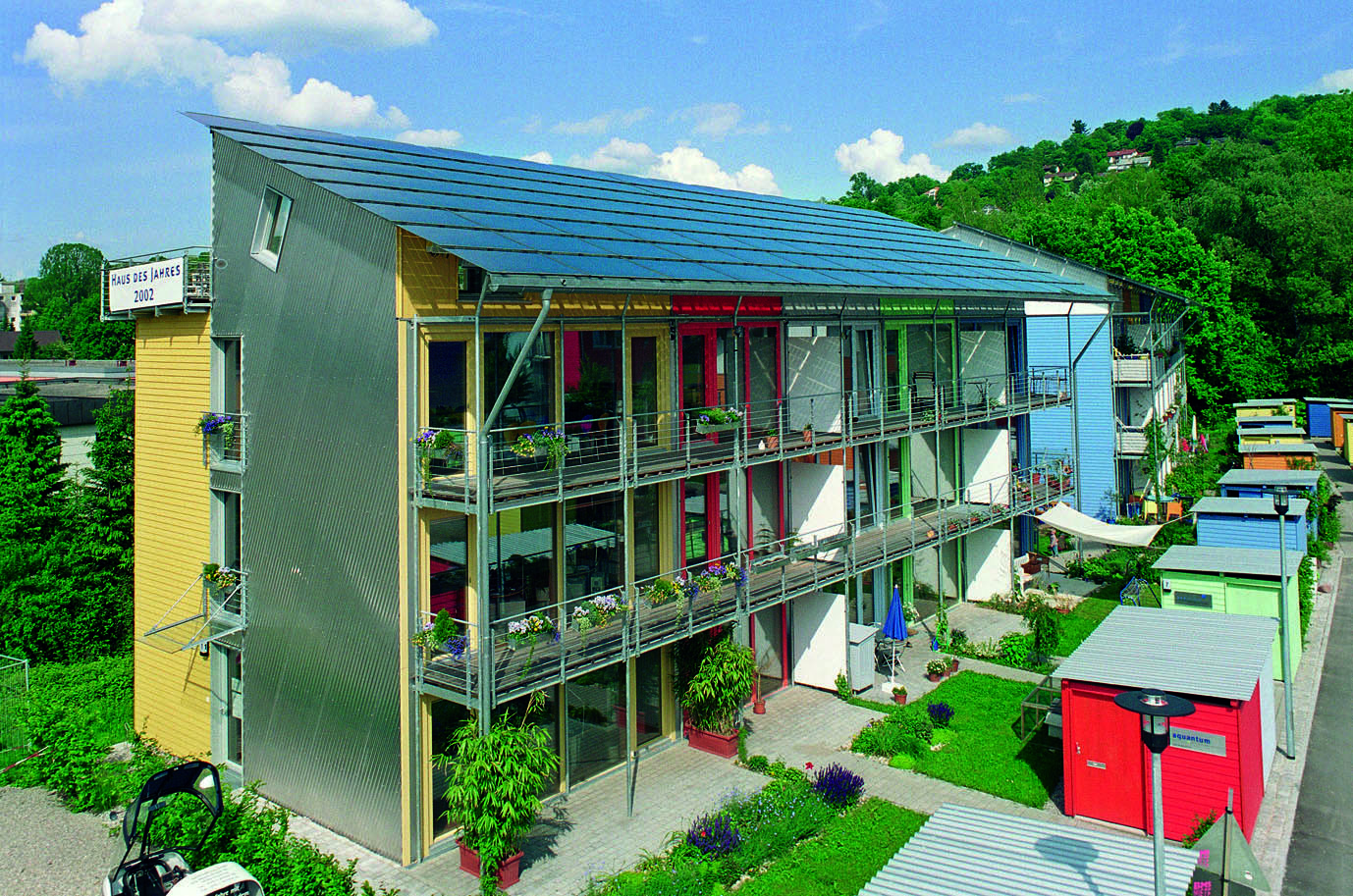
A PlusEnergy home designed by Rolf Disch Solar Architecture, 2000

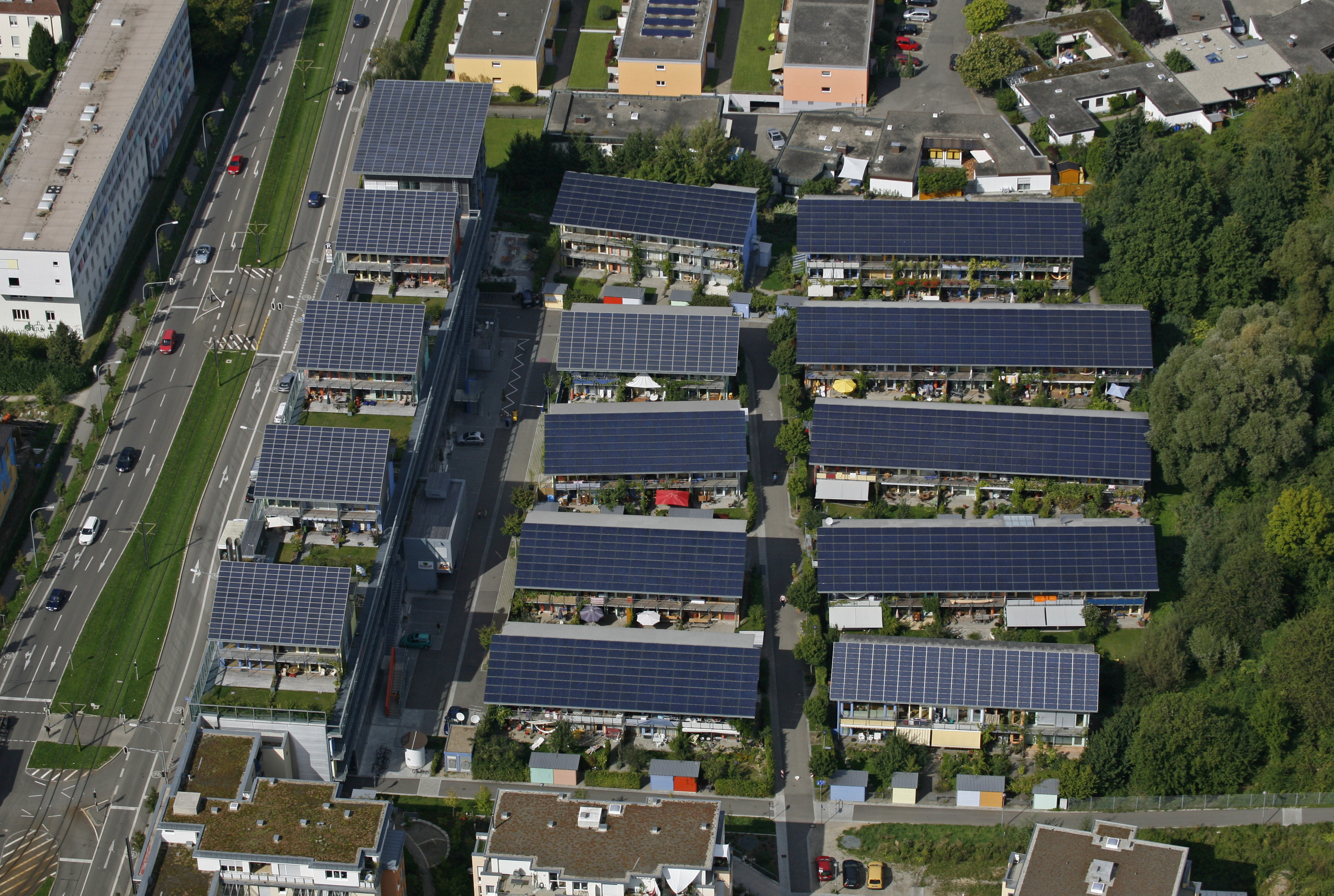
59 PlusEnergy Homes - the Solar Settlement in Vauban Freiburg, 2002

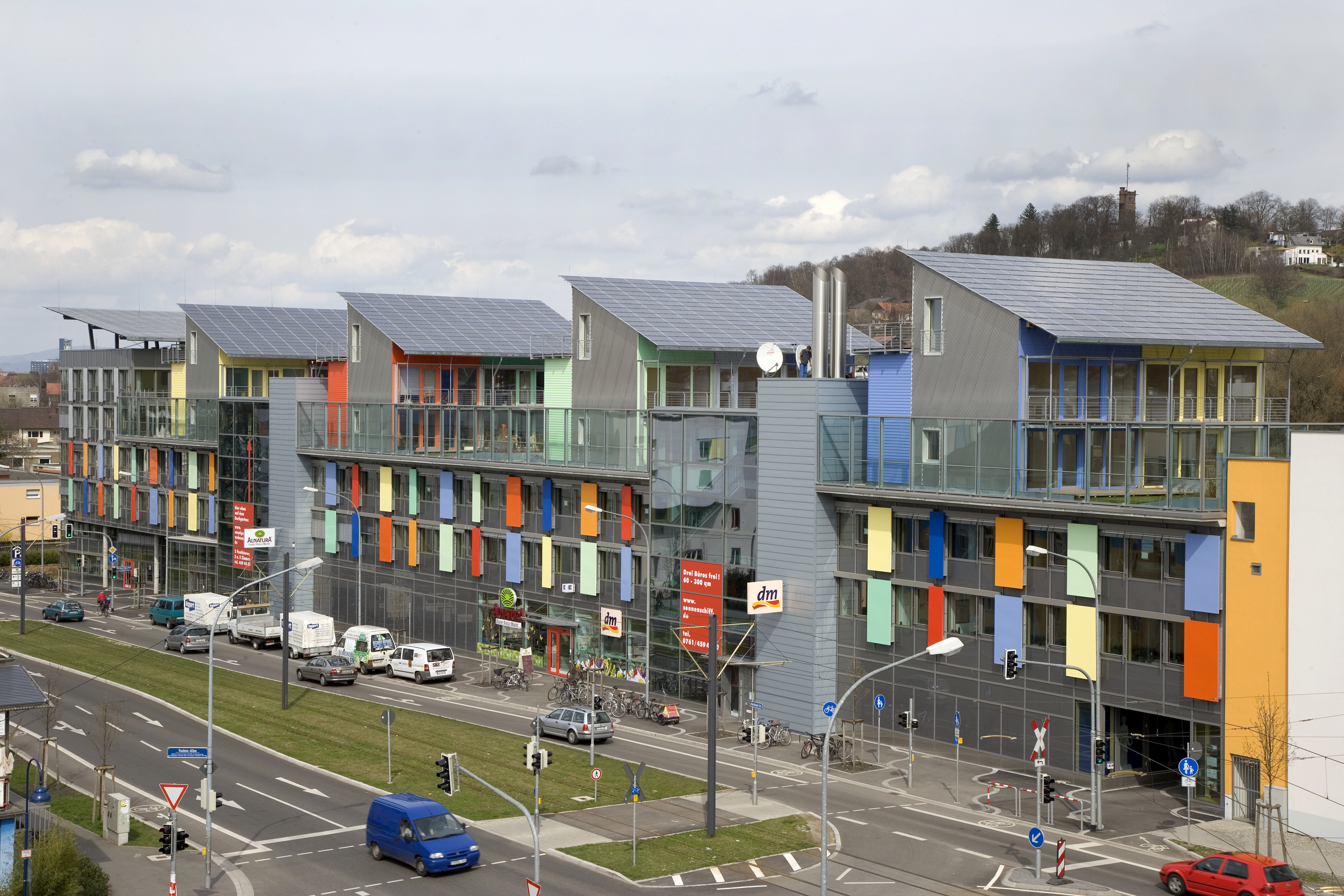
The PlusEnergy Sun Ship in Vauban Freiburg, 2004

== See also ==
- Sustainable architecture
- Passive solar design
- Anti-nuclear movement in Germany
- Green building
- Zero-energy building
- Hermann Scheer
- Michael Sladek
