= EnergyX DY-Building =

South Korean building

Coordinates: 37.6025°N 126.8965°E

- 에너지엑스 DY빌딩
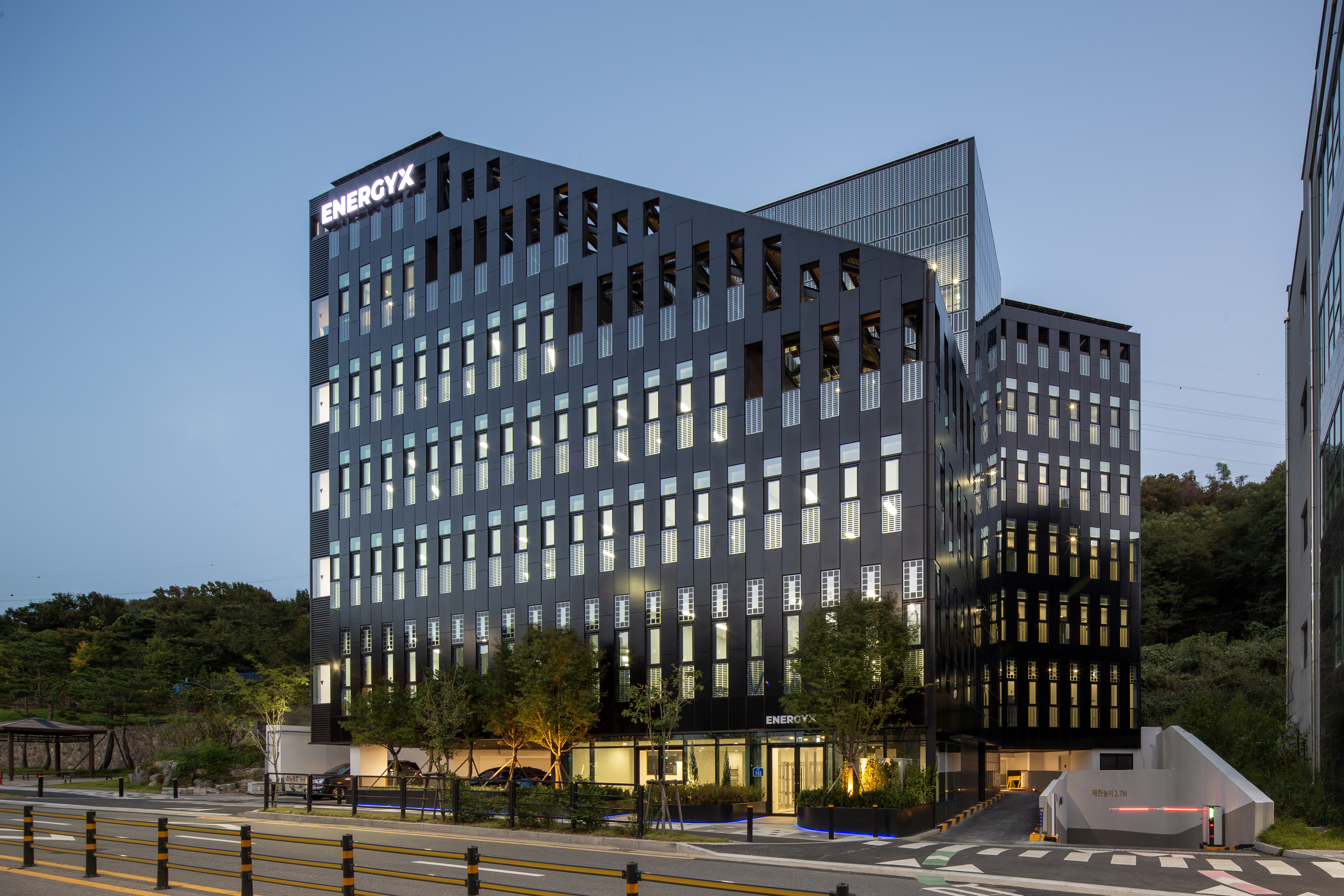

General information
- Location: 152, Hyanggiro, Hyangdong-dong, Deokyang-gu, Goyang-si, Gyeonggi-do, Korea
- Year built: 2023

Technical details
- Floor count: 7
- Floor area: 3,274.87 m^{2} (35,250.4 sq ft)

EnergyX DY-Building (Korean: 에너지엑스 DY빌딩) is a zero-energy building located at 152, Hyanggi-ro, Deogyang-gu, Goyang-si, Gyeonggi-do, Republic of Korea. The building has a total floor area of 3,274.87 m^{2} (35,250.4 sq ft) and consists of seven floors, commercial building. The name DY-Building is derived from "Dynamic Yield".

EnergyX DY-Building is the world’s first certified Plus Zero Energy Building. From the initial design phase, the goal was to implement PEB (Plus Energy Building) concepts by minimizing energy demands through passive design and active system technologies while maximizing energy production using renewable energy sources. The building achieved an energy self-sufficiency rate of 129.59%, generating more energy than it consumes. This exceptional performance earned it the nickname "small power plant" and led to it becoming the world’s first officially certified Plus Energy Building. It was awarded the highest Zero Energy Building (ZEB) certification available in South Korea—classified as the Plus (+) Tier, a special designation that significantly exceeds the standard Tier 1 level.

== Applied technologies ==
=== Passive design ===
To minimize the energy demand of the EnergyX DY-Building, high-performance insulation and window systems were applied. The thermal insulation performance of the exterior walls was designed to be 0.152W/m²K, which is 37% higher than the 0.240W/m²K standard for Climate Zone 2 in the Building Energy Saving Design Criteria. Additionally, 42mm low-emissivity (Low-E) triple glazing was installed to minimize the effects of solar radiation, including solar heat gain and window thermal transmittance.

=== Active system ===
Active systems refer to the mechanical and electrical design phase aimed at handling the loads required to maintain a comfortable indoor environment, including cooling, heating, hot water, lighting, and ventilation.

The heating and cooling source for the EnergyX DY-Building is an Electric Heat Pump (EHP), while the hot water supply is provided by electric water heaters. A total of 11 EHP units have been installed, with an average Coefficient of Performance (COP) of 3.54 for cooling and 3.72 for heating, utilizing first-grade energy efficiency products. To enhance indoor air quality and comfort, a ventilation system has been introduced, and 39 total heat exchangers have been installed across various zones. The minimum effective heat exchange efficiency has been set to over 50% for cooling and over 70% for heating to reduce energy consumption.

For lighting, high-efficiency energy-certified LED lighting products were selected for each zone, with a lighting control system installed to reduce operational energy consumption. The lighting system is integrated with the Building Energy Management System (BEMS), and the control system is configured to adjust indoor LED lighting brightness in three levels.

=== Photovoltaic system ===
A photovoltaic system, also called a PV system or solar power system, is an electric power system designed to supply usable solar power by means of photovoltaics.

The PV modules have been installed on the roof and sloped areas. A total of 82kW of PV modules have been installed, with 64kW placed horizontally on the roof and 18kW installed on the sloped areas of the roof.

=== Building Integrated Photovoltaic System ===
Building-integrated photovoltaics (BIPV) are photovoltaic materials that are used to replace conventional building materials in parts of the building envelope such as the roof, skylights, or façades.

To achieve energy self-sufficiency, simply covering all available building façade spaces with solar panels would be the easiest approach, but this would compromise the building's design. To address this, the Building-Integrated Photovoltaic (BIPV) system was developed. This system replaces conventional building materials with photovoltaic modules that not only serve as the exterior cladding but also generate electricity.

In the case of the Energy X DY Building, the façade was designed using a curtain wall system.

Solar Installation Locations and Capacity for the Energy X DY Building

Category	Section	Area(m²)	Capacity(kW)
PV	Rooftop Horizontal Surface	298.98	64.00
PV	Sloped Roof Surface	85.42	18.00
BIPV-1 SKALA	Façade (West, South, Southwest, Southeast)	1,062.54	112.918
Total		1,446.94	194.918
Final ZEB Certification Self-Sufficiency Rate		129.59%	

== Records ==
- The World’s First Commercial Plus Zero Energy Building
- Achieved Building Energy Efficiency Rating 1+++
- Attained Energy Self-Sufficiency Rate of 129.59%
- Awarded Tier 1 Zero Carbon Building (ZCB) Certification for Carbon-Neutral Architecture
