= Solar Settlement at Schlierberg =

Housing development in Freiburg, Germany

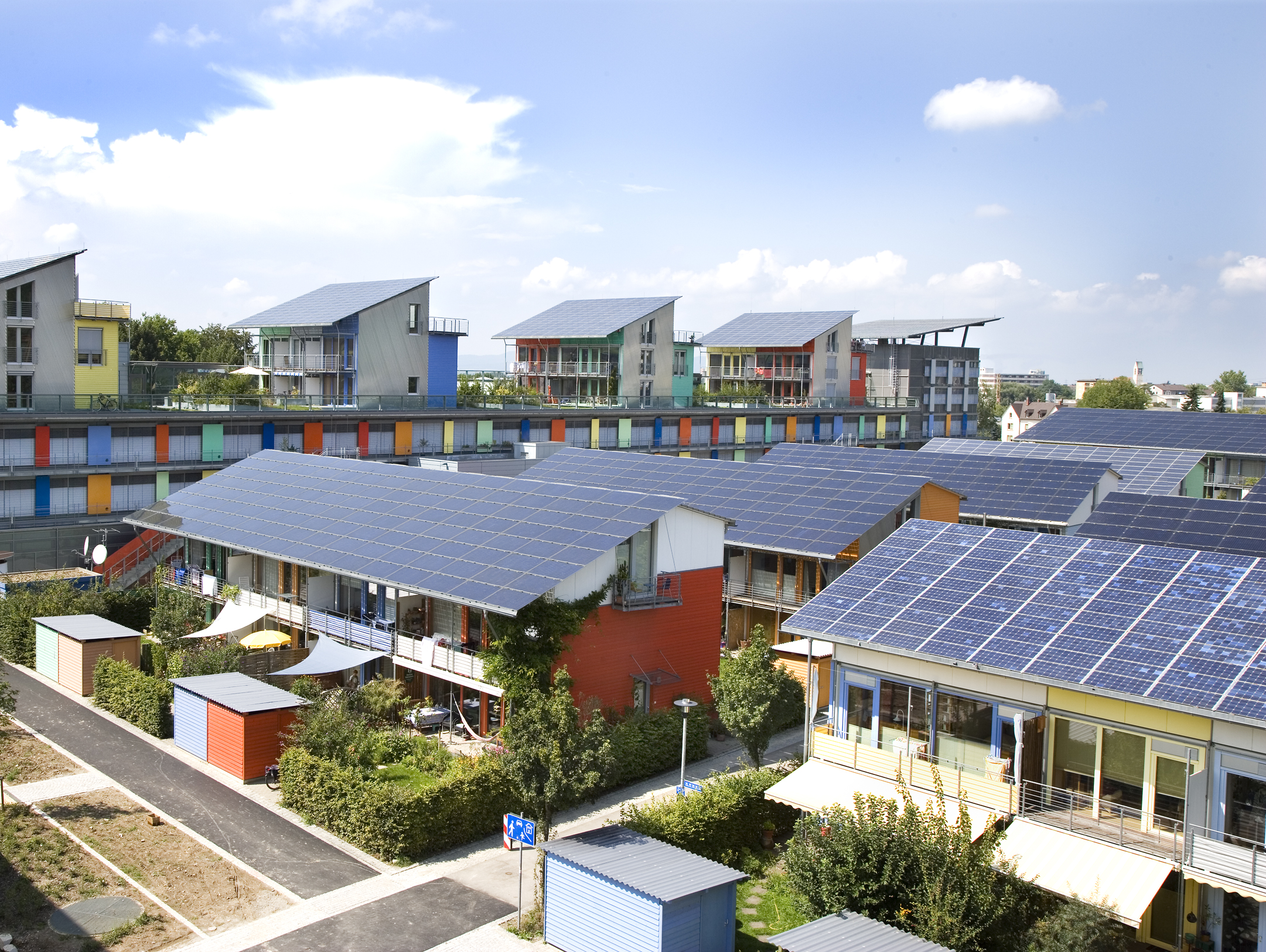
Solar Settlement with the Sun Ship in the background: two PlusEnergy projects in Freiburg

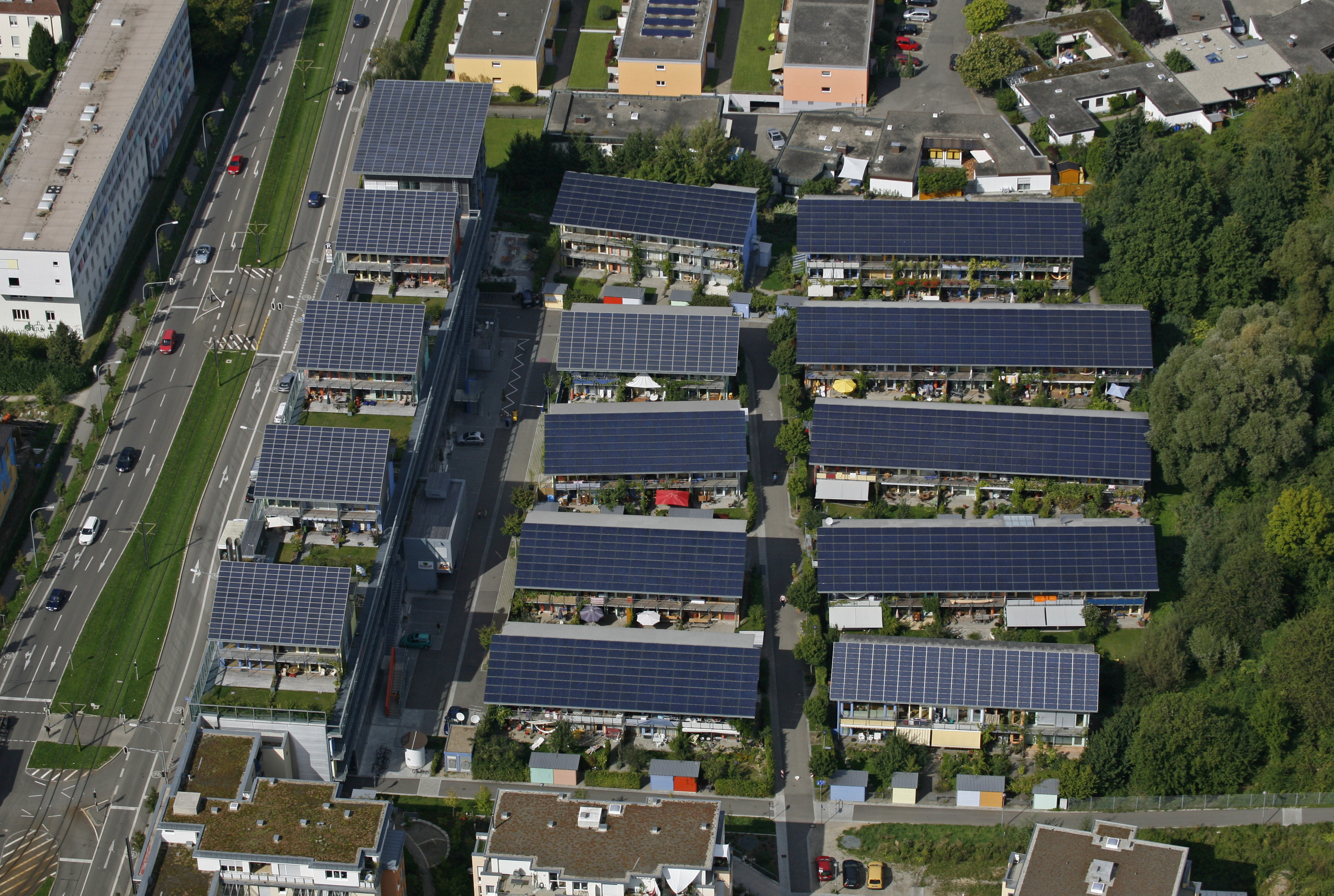
Solar Settlement in Freiburg

The Solar Settlement at Schlierberg (German: Solarsiedlung am Schlierberg) is a 59-home PlusEnergy housing community in Freiburg, Germany. Solar architect Rolf Disch wanted to apply his PlusEnergy concept, created originally with his Heliotrope home, to mass residential production. The residential complex won awards, including House of the Year (2002), Residential PV solar integration award (2002), and "Germany's most beautiful housing community" (2006). It is one of the first housing communities in the world in which all the homes produce a positive energy balance and which is emissions-free and CO_{2} neutral.

== Location ==
The Solar Settlement at Schlierberg is a 59-home PlusEnergy housing community at Elly-Heuss-Knapp-Strasse/ Rosa-Luxemburg-Strasse adjacent to the Vauban quarter about 3 km from Freiburg city centre in South West Germany. Five rows of terraced houses with a Southern orientation are grouped to the left and right of a central access road, housing about 170 residents.

== Buildings ==
Construction began 1999 and the settlement was completed in 2006. The houses contain 2-3 floors and were built with ecological building materials via wooden post-and-beam construction from regional forests and prefabricated individual modules, PVC-free, and environmentally friendly insulation materials.

Apartment sizes are from 81 to 210 m^{2} and are rental and owner-occupied. An underground parking lot keeps the street car free.

=== Energy ===
The houses are oriented to the South for optimal passive and active use of solar energy. Thermal insulation is used according to passive house standard, including glazing of the main facades with a U-value of 0.5, resulting in a heat requirement of only 11-14 kilowatt hours per m^{2} and year, which as of 2012 was 200 € (including maintenance costs) per year. Each house has a decentralized ventilation system with heat recovery. The settlement is connected to a local heating network.

The south facing roofs are covered with photovoltaic modules with a generation potential of 445 kWp of the entire site. As of 2022, it is the largest residential roof-integrated photovoltaic system.

PlusEnergy is a concept developed by Rolf Disch denoting a "structure's extreme energy efficiency so that it holds a positive energy balance", producing more energy than it uses. In 1994, Disch had created the first PlusEnergy house in the world with the completion of his private residence, the Heliotrope. According to Disch "PlusEnergy is a fundamental environmental imperative".

== Awards ==
The settlement and the PlusEnergy house concept won the following prizes:

- 1999, 1st prize "Innovation Award " of the German magazine Immobilien Manager
- 2000, 1st prize "Holzkreativpreis" of BUND e.V.
- 2001 / 2002, 1st prize "Architecture prize for single-family houses" from Stern (magazine)
- 2001, 2nd prize "Photovoltaic Architecture Prize Baden- Württemberg".
- European Solar Prize from Eurosolar e.V. for Rolf Disch s commitment

== See also ==
- Sustainable architecture
- Energy-plus-house
- Passive solar design
- Green building
- Zero-energy building
