= Heliotrope (building) =

Building in Freiburg im Breisgau, Germany

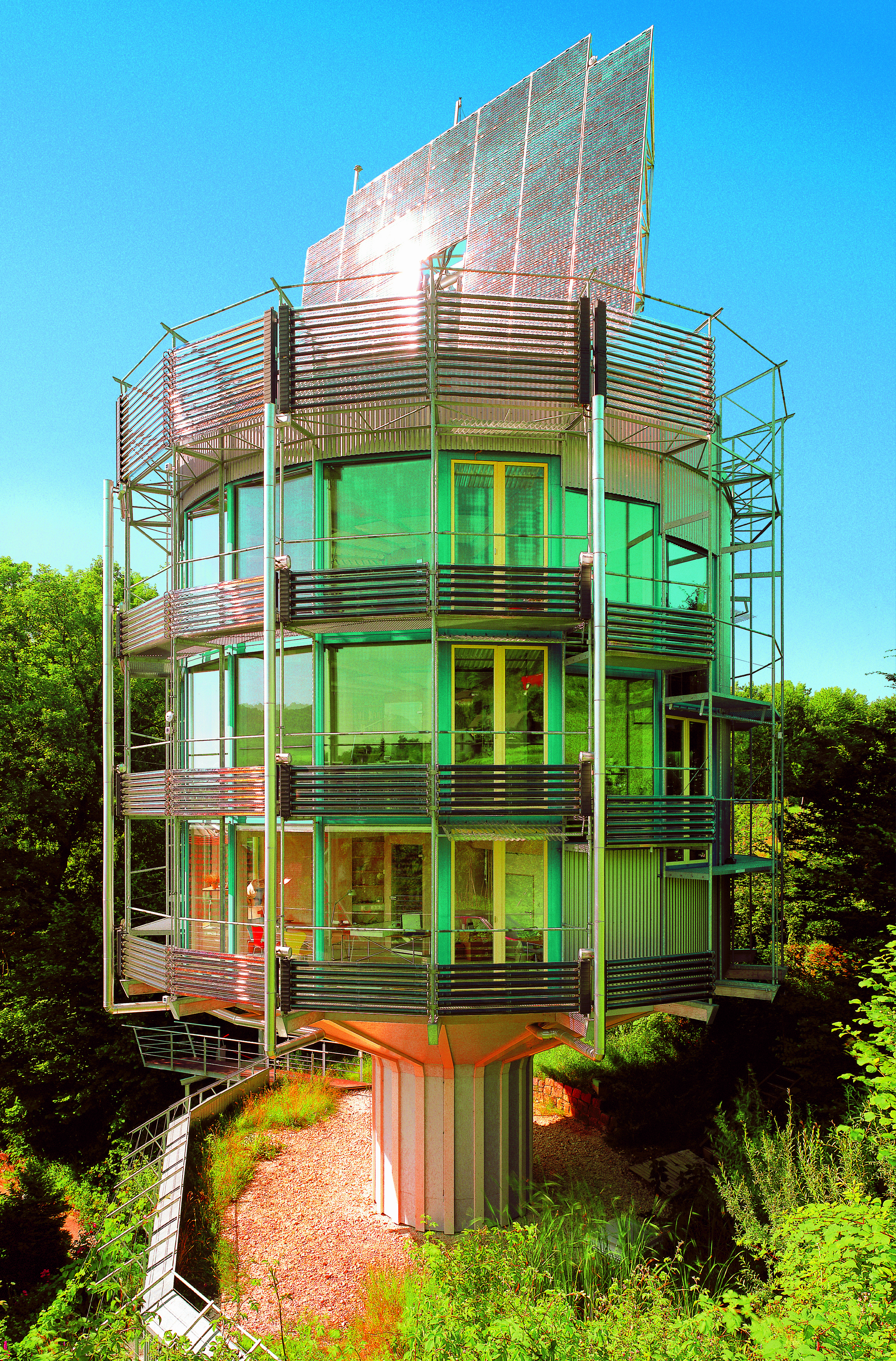
Heliotrope in Freiburg

The Heliotrope is an environmentally friendly housing project by German architect Rolf Disch. There are three such buildings in Germany. The first experimental version was built in 1994 as the architect's home in Freiburg im Breisgau, while the other two were used as exhibition buildings for the Hansgrohe company in Offenburg and a dentist's lab in Hilpoltstein in Bavaria.

Several different energy generation modules are used in the building including a 603 sq ft (56.0 m^{2}) dual-axis solar photovoltaic tracking panel, a geothermal heat exchanger, a combined heat and power unit (CHP) and solar-thermal balcony railings to provide heat and warm water. These innovations along with the favorable insulation of the residence allows the Heliotrope to capture anywhere between four and six times its energy usage depending on the time of year. The Heliotrope is also fitted with a grey-water cleansing system and built-in natural waste composting.

At the same time that Freiburg ’s Heliotrope was built, Hansgrohe contracted Disch's architecture practice to design and build another Heliotrope to be used as a visitor’s center and showroom in Offenburg, Germany. A third one was then contracted and built in Hilpoltstein, Bavaria to be used as a technical dental laboratory. Disch's unique design accommodates different utilizations from private residences to laboratories, and nevertheless maintains the structure's positive energy balance.

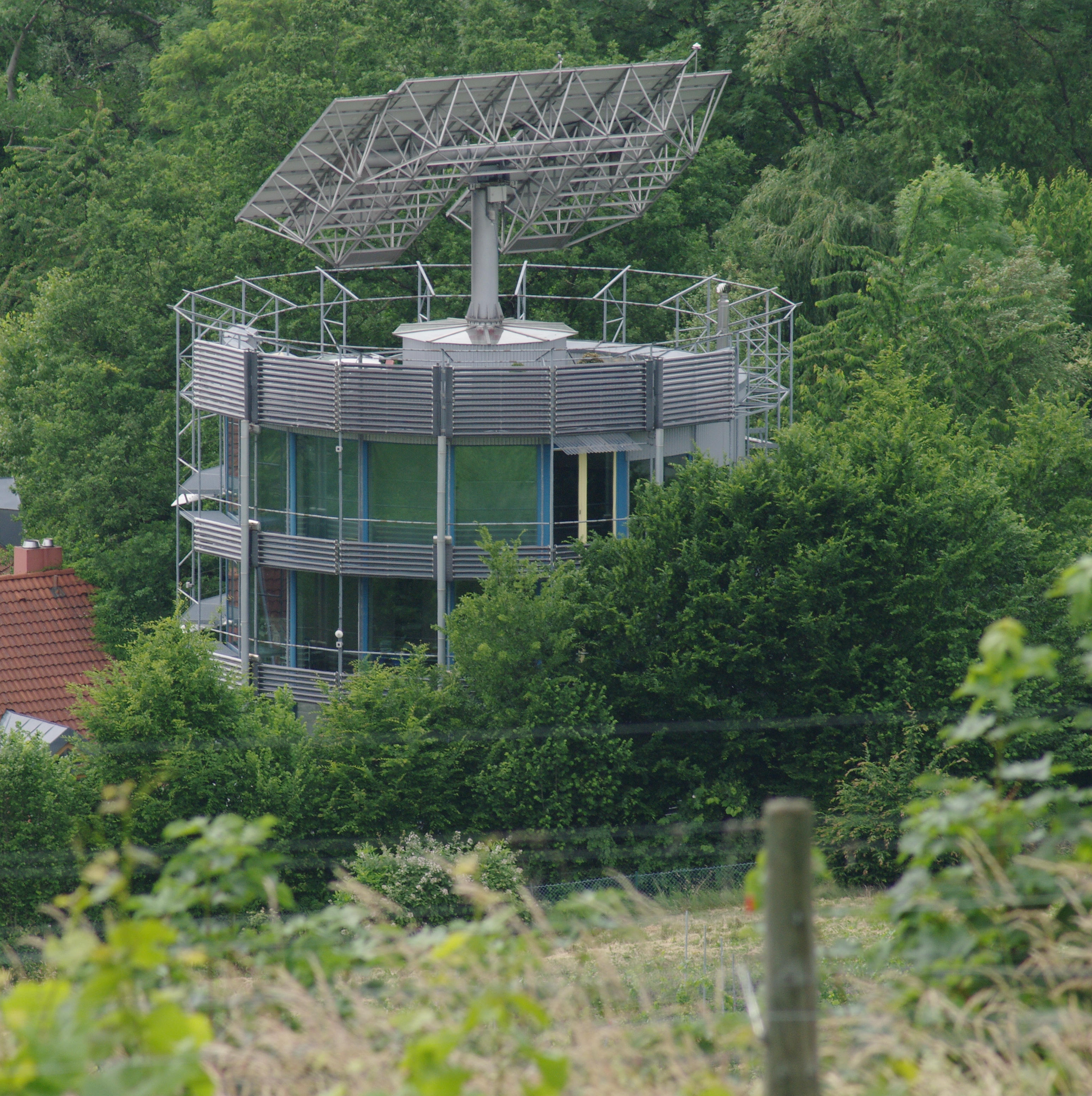
Heliotrop Rotating House

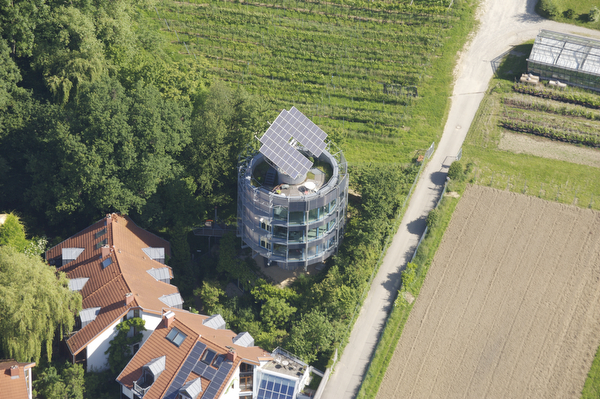
Bird's eye view of the Heliotrope in Freiburg

Heliotrope-Hotel Schloss Waretenstein

Disch also designed the Sonnenschiff office complex.

== PlusEnergy ==
PlusEnergy is a concept coined by Rolf Disch that indicates a structure's energy efficiency. A PlusEnergy building holds a positive energy balance, generating more energy than it uses. The first Heliotrope Disch built in 1994 was the first house to be PlusEnergy certified. Disch built several more projects with PlusEnergy certifications with the goal of bringing the concept to the residential, commercial and retail space. “PlusEnergy is a fundamental environmental imperative,” Disch claims. Disch believes that passive building is not enough because passive homes still emit CO_{2} into the atmosphere.

== Environment and energy needs ==
The house is designed to face the sun with its triple-pane windows (U = 0.5) during the heating months of the year and turn its highly insulated back (U = 0.12) to the sun during the warmer months when heating isn't necessary. This significantly reduces heating and cooling requirements for the building throughout the year, which are provided for by a heat pump, while hot water is provided by vacuum-tube solar panels.

Photovoltaic solar panels with a rated power of 6.6 kW on its roof provide five to six times more energy than the building uses, making the building "energy positive" (PlusEnergy). To further improve energy generation, the panels also rotate independently of the building to follow the sun, while being able to adapt its orientation in case of strong winds.

== Water usage and natural waste management ==
In order to limit water usage, a gray water circuit (for washing dishes and clothes) is used. Wastewater is purified in a vegetated cascade pond outside the edifice and it also collects rainwater.

Natural waste and excrement are dry composted in the structure as well.

== Awards ==
- 2008 German Sustainability Award
- 2007–08 Japanese PEN-Magazine Creativity Award
- 2005 Wuppertal Energy and Environment Prize
- 2003 Global Energy Award
- 2002 European Solar Prize
- 2001 Photovoltaic Architecture Prize Baden-Württemberg

== Selected works ==
- Heliotrope, Vauban, Freiburg, 1994
- Heliotrope, Offenburg, 1994
- Heliotrope, Hilpoltstein, 1995
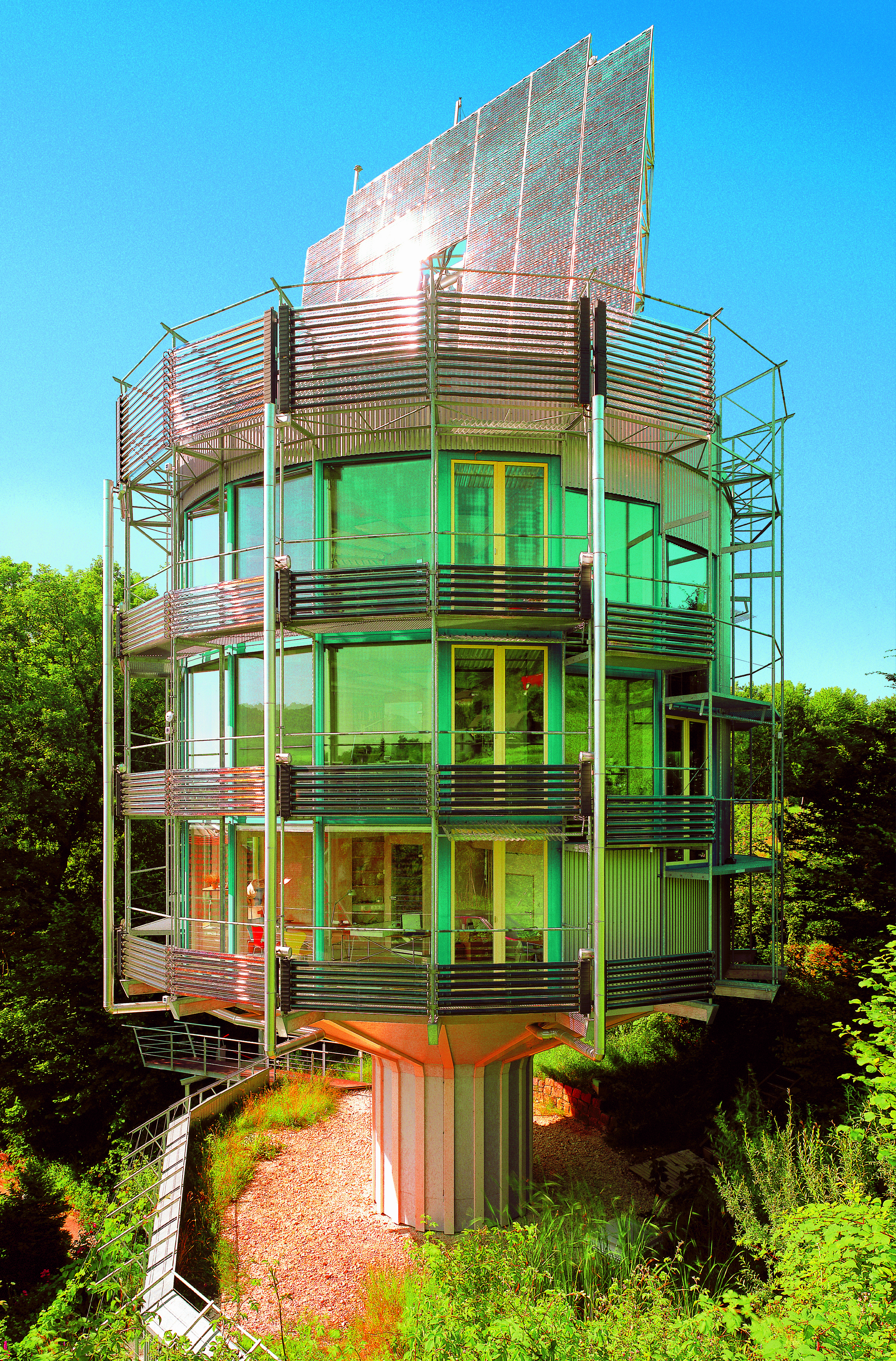
Heliotrope in Vauban, Freiburg, 1994

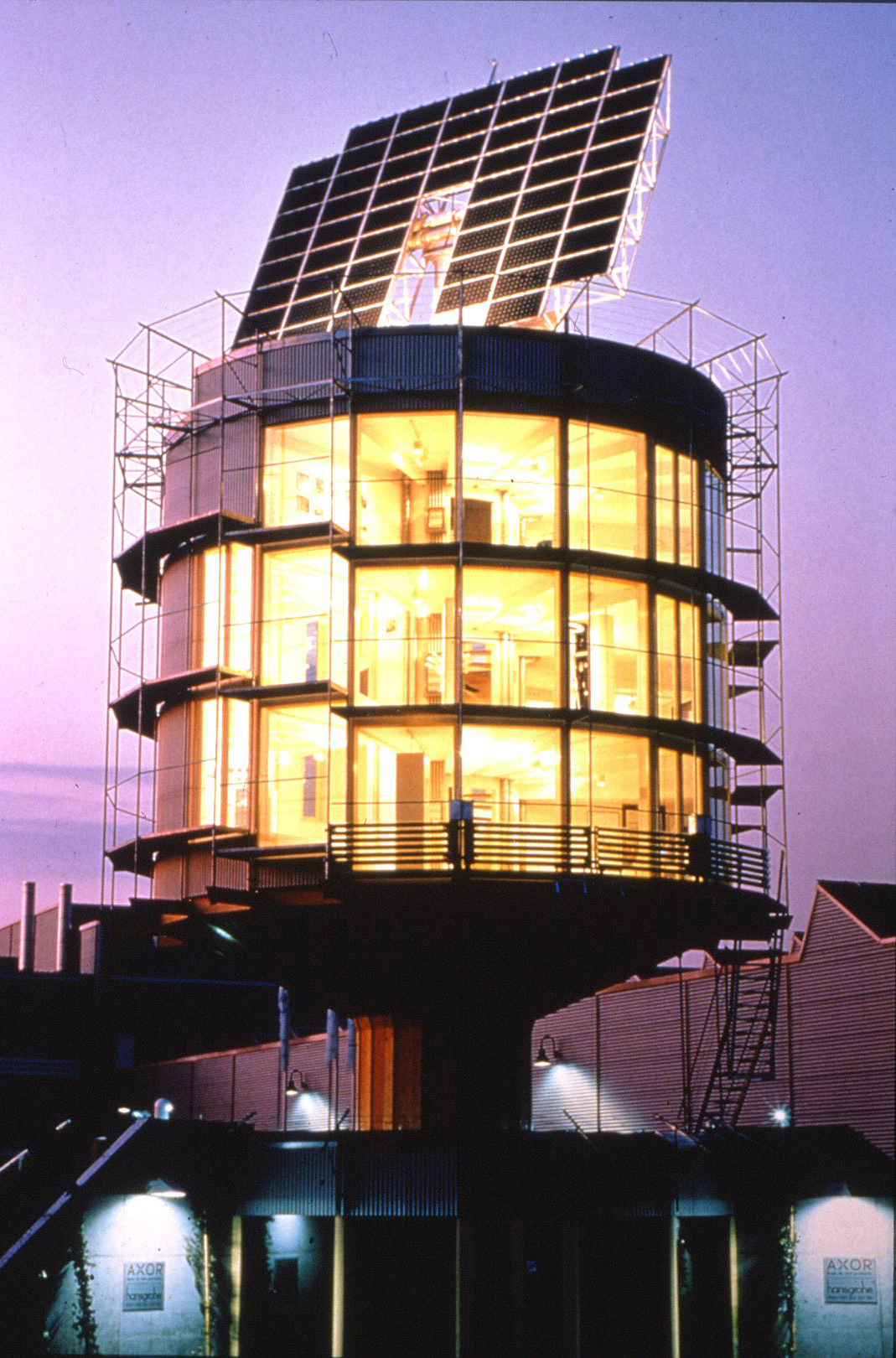
Heliotrope built for Hansgrohe in Offenburg, 1994

== See also ==
- Sustainable architecture
- Sun Ship
- Solar Settlement
- Energy-plus-house
- Passive solar design
- Anti-nuclear movement in Germany
- Green building
- Zero-energy building
- Villa Girasole
