= Villa Girasole =

Villa near Verona, Italy

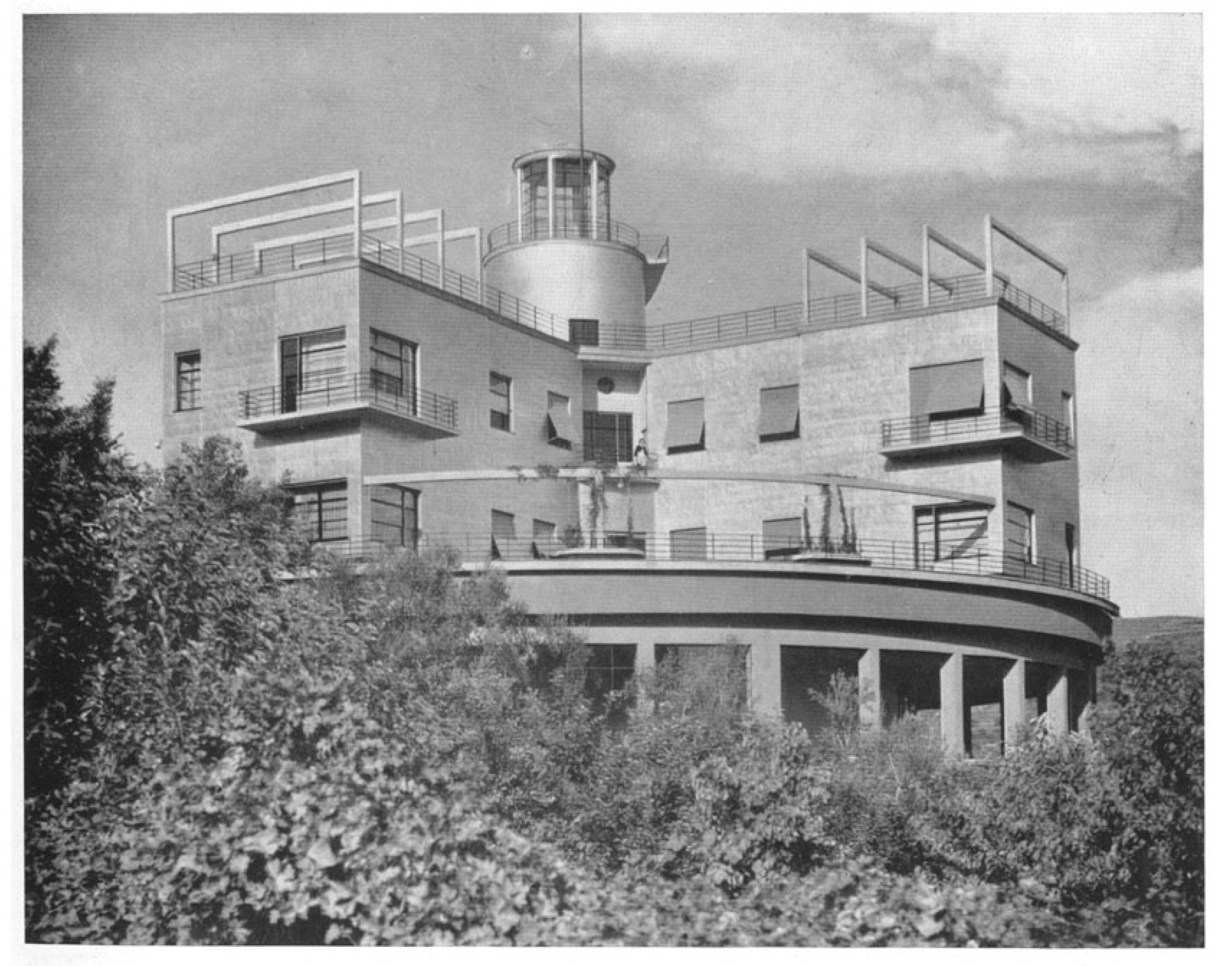
View of the house in a 1936 image from Architettura magazine

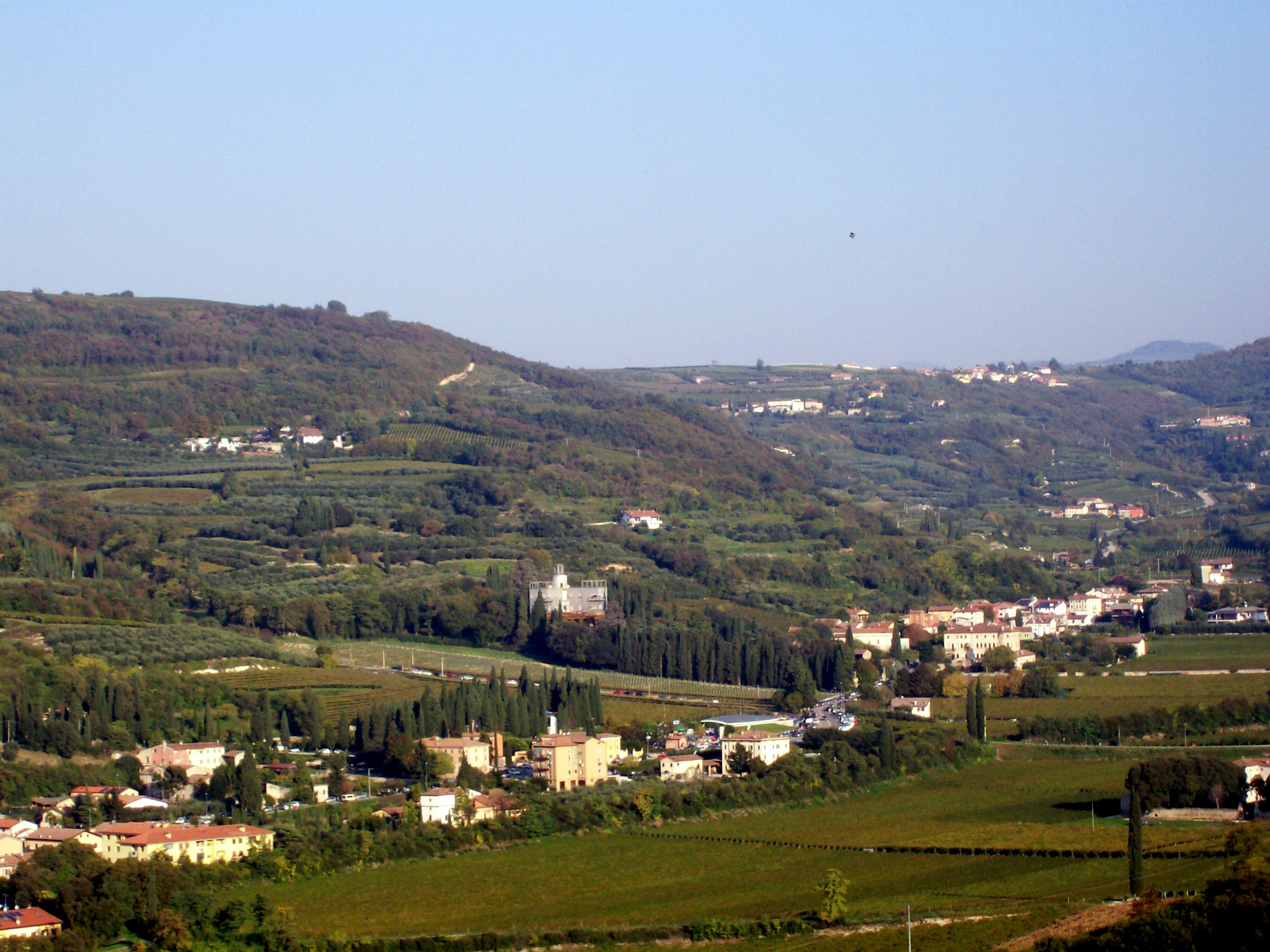
Panorama of part of the town of Marcellise with Villa Girasole almost in the center. At the top right you can see Pian di Castagnè.

The Villa Girasole (il girasole meaning ‘the sunflower’ in Italian) is a house constructed in the 1930s in Marcellise, northern Italy, near Verona. The conception of architect Angelo Invernizzi, the Girasole rotates to follow the sun as it moves, just as a sunflower opens up and turns to follow the sun. This is how the unique house got its name.

== Architect ==
Angelo Invernizzi, a wealthy Italian engineer of Genoa, Italy, dreamed of building a house that would “maximize the health properties of the sun by rotating to follow it”. He designed the house for himself with the help of Romolo Carapacchi, a mechanical engineer; Fausto Saccorotti, an interior decorator; and Ettore Fagiuoli, an architect. Invernizzi's daughter, Lidia Invernizzi, described in the 17-minute film “Il girasole: una casa vicino a Verona” by Marcel Meili and Christoph Schaub, Invernizzi could have built the house himself, but he instead invited many people to participate in its creation: painters, sculptors, furniture makers, and more. “People who believed in a new era: nothing should be built as before.” Having a family connection to Marcellise, even though working and living in Genoa, he wanted to build the house there in its hilly splendor and with its memories of a simpler life.

== History and construction ==
Invernizzi first began drawing designs for his rotating house in 1929, but construction started in 1931, only during summer months. Invernizzi and his team used the project as a means to experiment with new materials, like concrete and fibre cement. "In keeping with the project's experimental nature, a considerable amount of adaptation and refinement accompanied construction". They ended up using aluminium sheeting to replace the concrete on the outside walls because the concrete had left cracks. At first, Invernizzi only expected the house to make a 180 degree turn, but eventually after he saw it make the 180 degree turn, he "decided to make the complete turn" of 360 degrees. The project was complete in 1935, after four years.

== Interior/exterior ==
The Girasole has two storeys and is shaped like the letter "L". It sits on an over 44-metre (144 ft) circular base, with a 42-metre-tall (138 ft) tower at the centre. This is where the house rotates from, using motors. The "L" rotates "over three circular tracks where 15 trolleys can slide the 5,000 cubic metres building at a speed of 4 mm per second and it takes 9 hours and 20 minutes to rotate fully". There is a manual control panel located in the moving part of the house that is used to control its rotation. The first floor of the moving part is known as the "day zone", and includes the dining room, the music room, Mr. and Mrs. Invernizzi's studies, with the kitchen, pantry, and toilet located right near the central tower. An assortment of bedrooms and bathrooms are found on the second floor. Villa Girasole's interior design is such that one experiences a number of different progressions of light throughout the day: "Though the views from either wing differ at any given moment, they share a general orientation to the sun, reducing the chance for conflict over which direction the house should point. All rooms could share an equal amount of daylight or shade".

== Machinery ==
Villa Girasole runs on two diesel fuel motors which move the house over circular tracks and allow trolleys to slide the house along. It has been suggested that because the front of the house faces the sun all day, installing solar panels on the roof would be beneficial: gaining and storing energy for those times when the sun is not out.
