= Sonnenschiff =

Building in Freiburg, Baden-Württemberg, Germany

Coordinates: 47.9750°N 7.8290°E

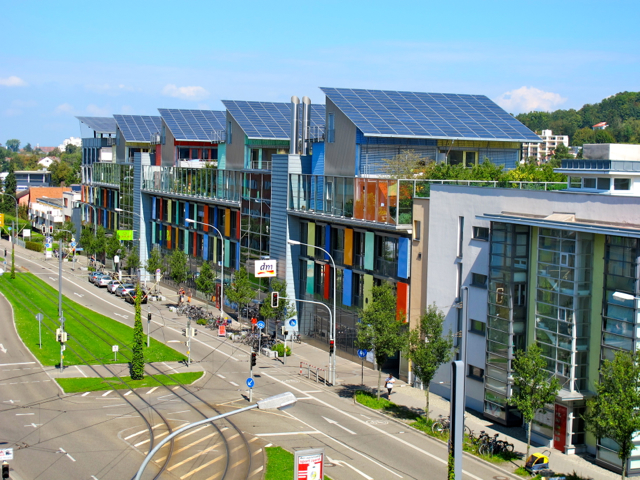
The Sun Ship

PlusEnergy penthouse of the Sun Ship's roof in Freiburg

Sonnenschiff (lit. 'sun ship') is a large integrated office and retail building in Freiburg im Breisgau, Germany. It was built in 2004 in the city's Vauban quarter as part of the Solar Settlement at Schlierberg. Sonnenschiff was designed by the architect Rolf Disch (who also built the Heliotrope building) and generates four times more energy than it uses.

As a whole this building produces more energy than it consumes per year and utilizes the most up-to-date building technology. Some aspects that make this building distinctive are its vacuum insulated walls, ventilation with 95% heat recovery, triple paned windows and its energy façade.

The office spaces are flanked on both the East and West sides with windows to maximize natural lighting and employee views while it minimizes the energy used for artificial lighting.

Sonnenschiff includes a supermarket, convenience store and bakery-café on the first floor, offices and work spaces on the 2-4 floors and 9 penthouses on its roof. In addition to the office and retail space, there are two conference rooms.

== Design ==
This steel-framed construction is called the "Sun Ship" as its skyline resembles the silhouette of a ship.

Its design allows it to naturally stay cool in the summer and to store heat in the winter.

The ground floor is used for high-end retail and commercial space. The next three floors are used as office and commercial space, while nine penthouses on its rooftop offer residential space (112 to 300 sq. meters).

== Residents ==
Apart from the nine penthouses, Sonnenschiff houses several companies such as the high-end supermarket Alnatura, a DM drug store and such institutions as Ökostrom and the non-profit Öko-Institut.

== PlusEnergy ==
PlusEnergy is a term coined by Rolf Disch that indicates a structure’s extreme energy efficiency so that it holds a positive energy balance, actually producing more energy than it uses. With the completion of his private residence, the Heliotrope, in 1994, Disch had created the first PlusEnergy house. His next goal in its development was thus the mass application of the concept to residential, commercial and retail space. As the concept further developed and gained financial backing as well, Disch built several more projects with PlusEnergy certifications. “PlusEnergy is a fundamental environmental imperative,” Disch claimed. Disch believes that passive building is not enough because passive homes still emit CO_{2} into the atmosphere.

== Awards ==
- 2008 German Sustainability Award
- 2007-08 Japanese PEN-Magazine Creativity Award
- 2006 Germany's most beautiful housing community
- 2005 Wuppertal Energy and Environment Prize
- 2003 Global Energy Award
- 2002 European Solar Prize

== See also ==
- Sustainable architecture
- Passive solar design
- Anti-nuclear movement in Germany
- Green building
- Zero-energy building
