= European Solar Prize =

Annual prize for advancement of renewable energy

The European Solar Prizes are a series of awards which have been given annually since 1994 by the European Association for Renewable Energy (EUROSOLAR) located in Bonn, Germany. The prizes are awarded to individuals or organizations for outstanding contributions to the utilization and applications of renewable energy in all its available forms.

== Selection ==
The European Solar Prizes competition is held simultaneously across multiple European countries, organized by various EUROSOLAR section members. All winners of the European Solar Prizes are selected from the entrants for the national Solar Prizes in each country and from the applications directly received at EUROSOLAR Germany.

The entrants for the national Solar Prizes are selected in the following European countries:

- Austria
- Bulgaria
- Czech Republic
- Denmark
- France
- Germany
- Hungary
- Italy
- Luxembourg
- Spain
- Turkey
- Ukraine
- United Kingdom

== Award categories ==
The European Solar Prizes are presented in the following categories:

- Towns/municipalities, council districts, municipal utilities
- Industrial and commercial companies or farmers
- Owners or users of installations utilizing renewable energy
- Local or regional associations promoting renewable energy projects
- Solar architecture and urban planning
- Media
- Transport systems with renewable energy
- Education and vocational training
- One-world co-operation
- Special achievement prize for outstanding individual commitment

== See also ==
- Solar energy in the European Union
- List of environmental awards
