= Energy-plus building =

Edifices with surplus electricity

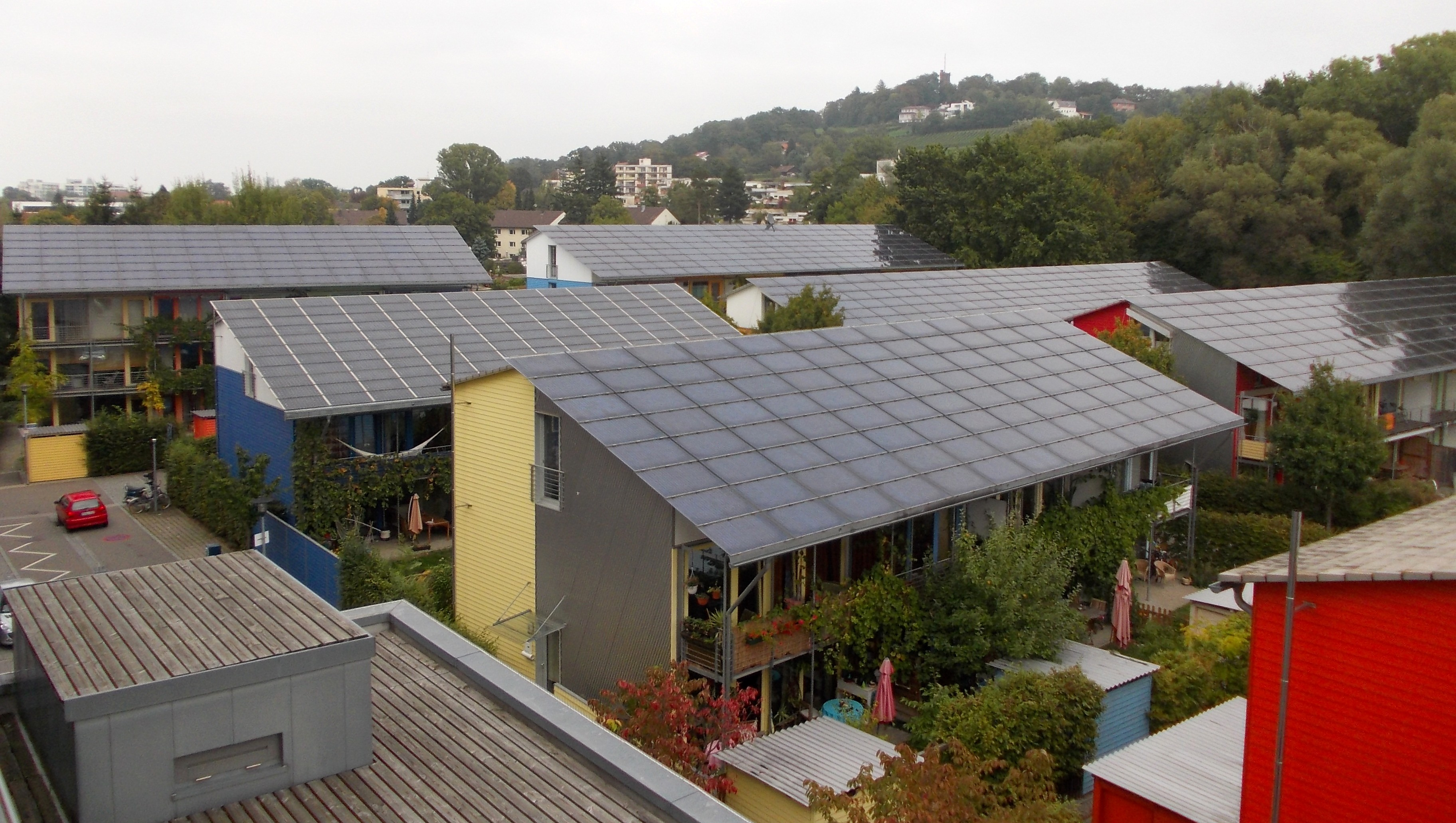
Energy-plus-houses at Freiburg-Vauban in Germany

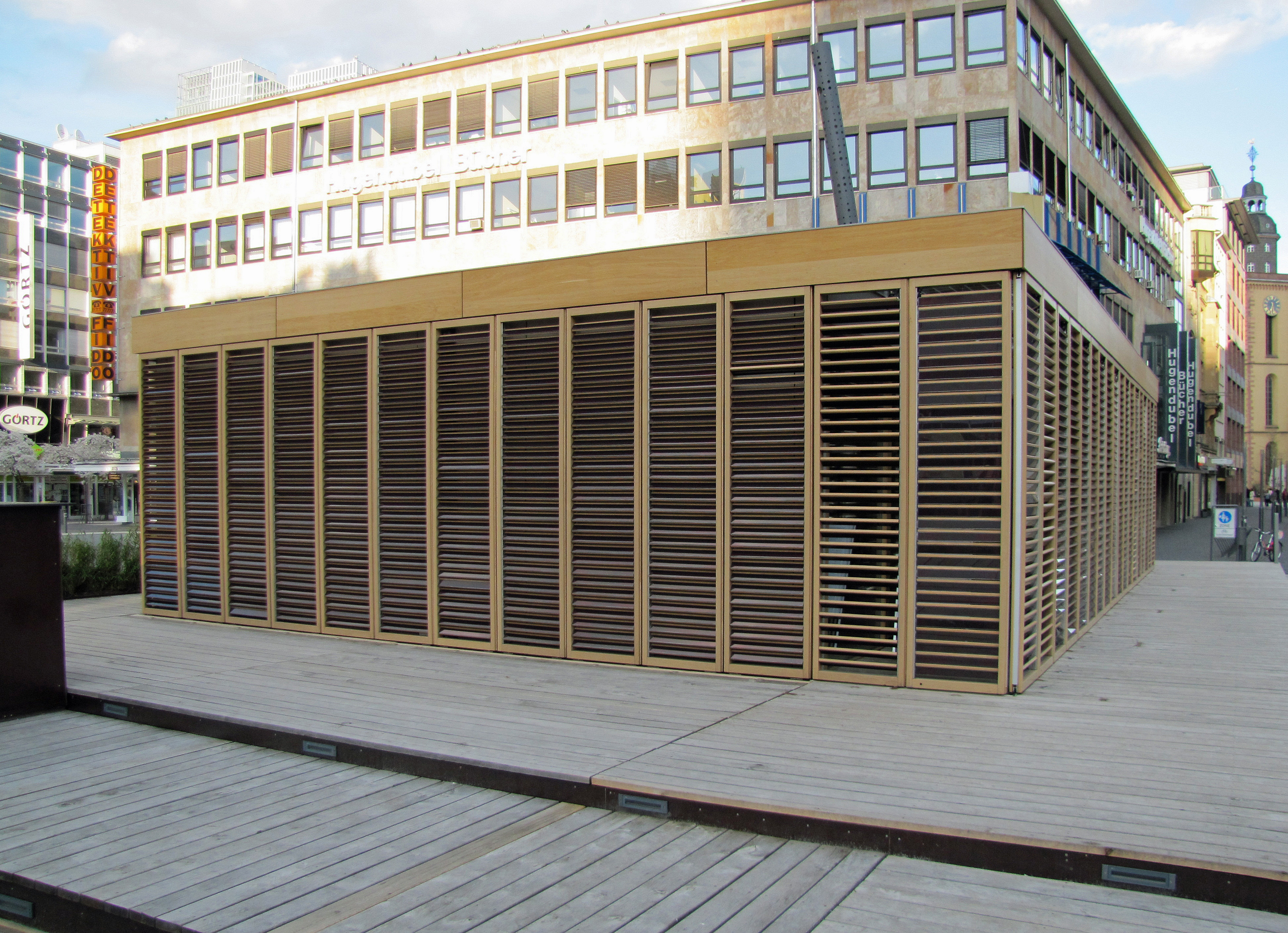
Prototype in Germany

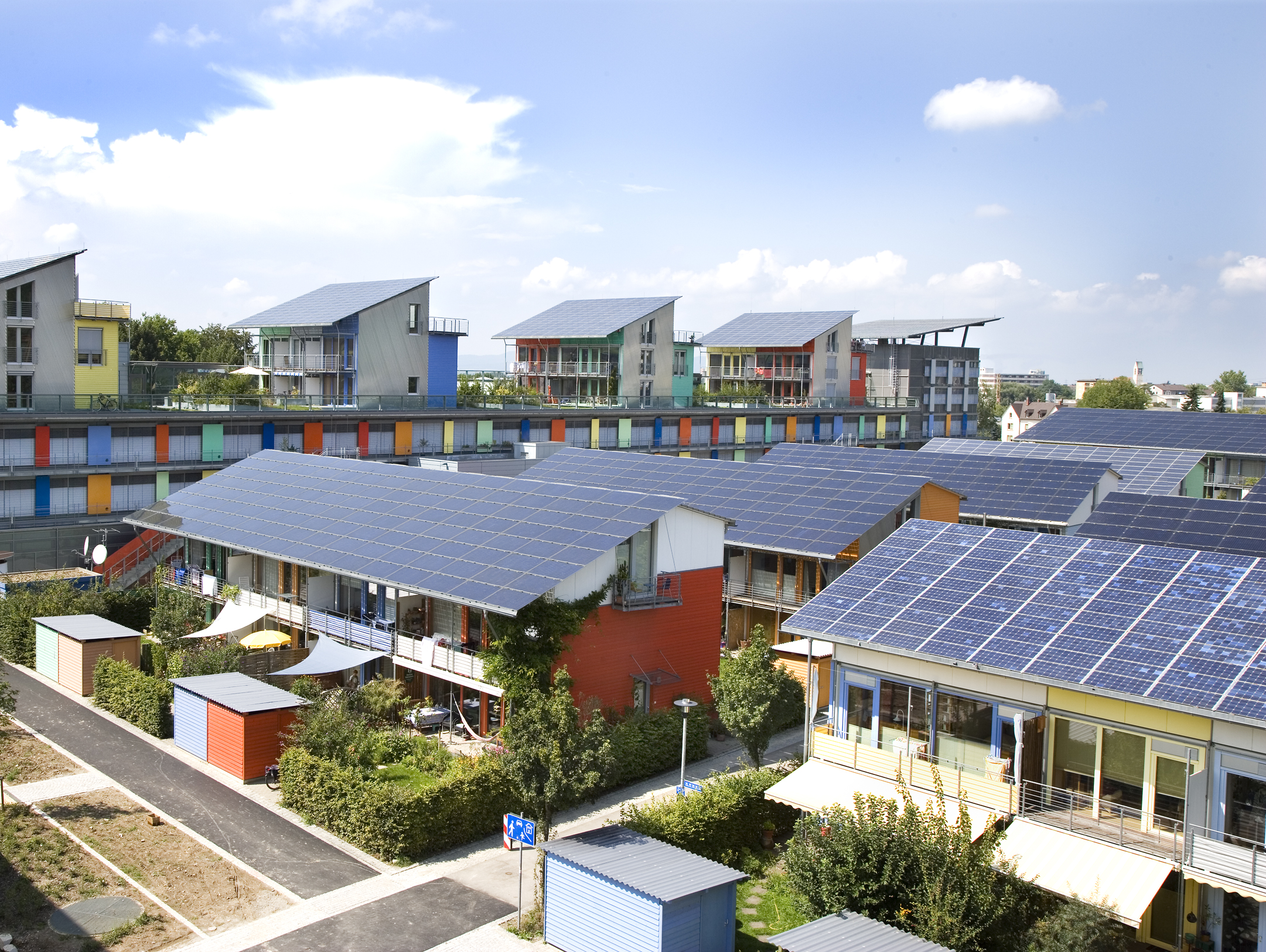
The Solar Settlement with the Sun Ship in the background: two PlusEnergy projects in Freiburg

An energy-plus building (also called: plus energy building, plus-energy house, efficiency-plus house) produces more energy from renewable energy sources, over the course of a year, than it consumes. This is achieved using a combination of microgeneration technology and low-energy building techniques, such as: passive solar building design, insulation and careful site selection and placement. A reduction of modern conveniences can also contribute to energy savings, however many energy-plus houses are almost indistinguishable from a traditional home, preferring instead to use highly energy-efficient appliances, fixtures, etc., throughout the house.

"Plusenergihuset" (the plus energy house) was the Danish term used by Jean Fischer in his publication from 1982 about his own energy-plus house. PlusEnergy is a brand name, used by Rolf Disch, to describe a structure that produces more energy than it uses. The term was coined by Disch in 1994 when building his private residence, the Heliotrope as the first PlusEnergy house in the world. Disch then went on to refine the concepts involved with several more projects built by his company, Rolf Disch Solar Architecture, in order to promote PlusEnergy for wider adoption in residential, commercial and retail spaces. Disch maintains that PlusEnergy is more than just a method of producing environmentally-friendly housing, but also an integrated ecological and architectural concept. As such, PlusEnergy is intended to be superior to low-energy or zero-energy designs such as those of Passivhaus.

== Technical approach ==
The PlusEnergy approach uses a variety of techniques to produce a building that generates more energy than it consumes. A typical example is to capture heat during the day in order to reduce the need to generate heat over night. This is achieved using large North and South facing window areas to allow sunlight to penetrate the structure, reducing the need for energy use from light bulbs. Triple-pane or quadruple-pane windows (U-value = 0.4 – 0.7 W(m^{2}K)) trap this heat inside, and the addition of heavy insulation then means the structure is already warm in the evening and therefore needs less heating. In the Sun Ship, a 60,000 sq ft (5,600 m^{2}) commercial, retail and residential PlusEnergy structure, techniques such as phase changing materials in the walls and vacuum insulation are also used. This permits maximum availability of floor space without compromising efficient insulation.

== Social and community aspects ==
An important part of the PlusEnergy approach that differentiates it from similar concepts is that the owner or tenant of a PlusEnergy building should be able to live and work comfortably in it without sacrificing lifestyle or normal living standards. For example, solar panels are made aesthetically pleasing so that they are integrated into the façade of the structure. This reflects PlusEnergy's emphasis on community planning and integration, with aspects of transportation, water management and communication also being seen as part of the design.

PlusEnergy design also emphasises the importance of sustainable development on communities in general. An energy-efficient community is seen as generating positive identification and community pride. Rolf Disch says he attracts a "high quality of tenant", innovative undertakings and creative work places through his designs. Ecological urban planning techniques like traffic management with wide, attractive walkways, bicycle routes and connections to public transportation are all part of the PlusEnergy ideal. At the Solar Settlement for example, tenants and owners incorporate bicycle and car-sharing, and the neighborhood has an extensive car-free zone with many public transportation connections.

== Example projects ==
=== Heliotrope ===
Built in 1994 as the private residence and special project of Rolf Disch in Freiburg, the Heliotrope is claimed by its designer to be the first building in the world to create more energy than it uses, being reliant on entirely renewable power, and being emissions free and CO_{2} neutral. The structure rotates to track the sun, which allows it to use a large amount of natural sunlight and warmth during the day. After the success of Freiburg’s Heliotrope, Hansgrohe contracted Rolf Disch Solar Architecture to design and built another Heliotrope to be used as a visitors' center and showroom in Offenburg, Germany. A third Heliotrope was then built in Hilpoltstein, Bavaria to be used as a technical dental laboratory.

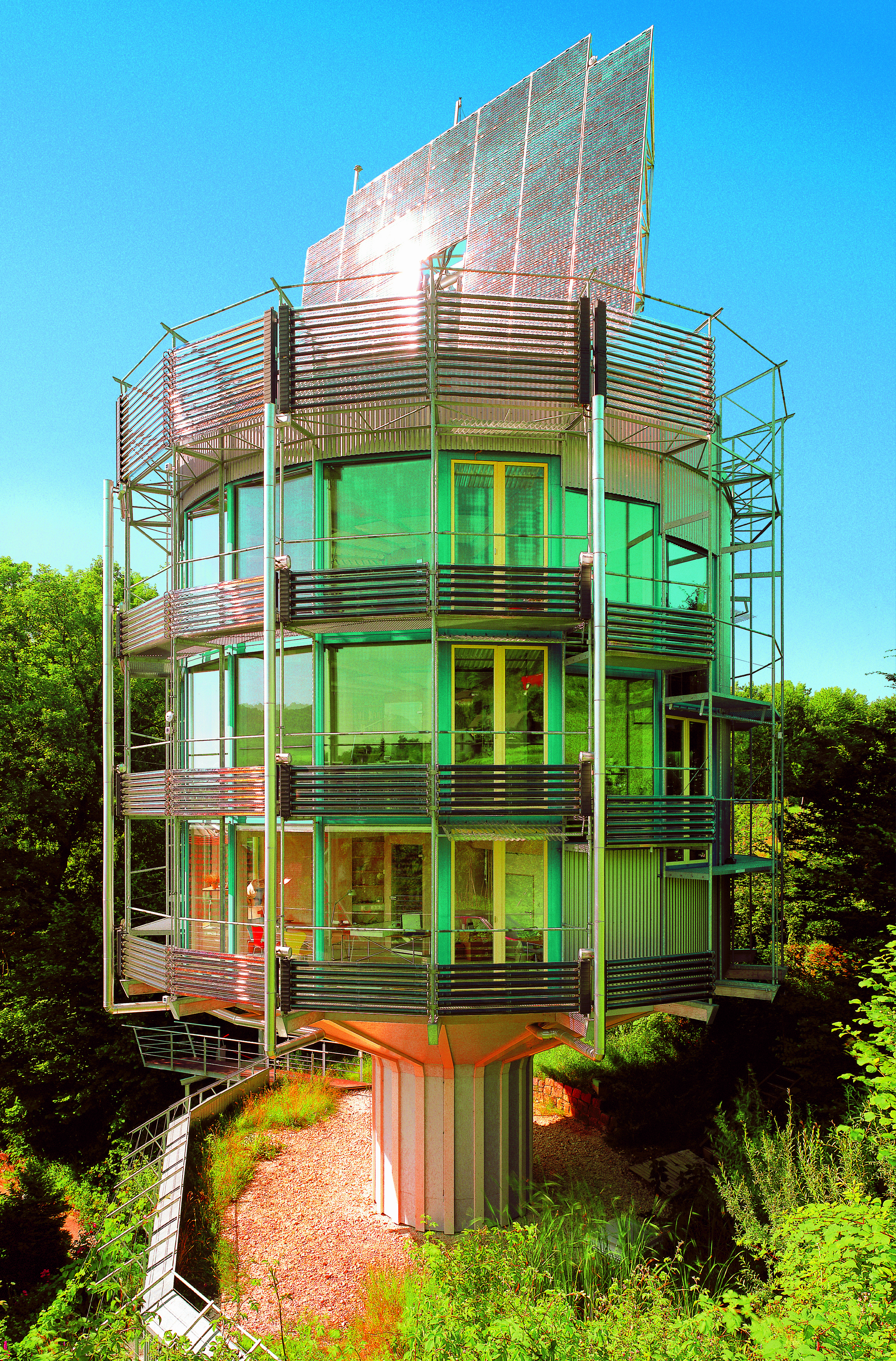
Heliotrope in Freiburg

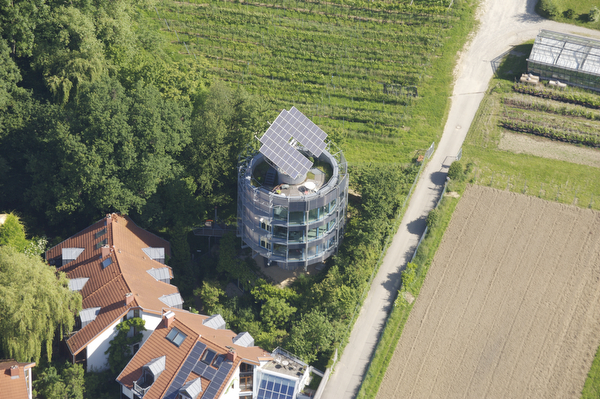
Bird's eye view of the Heliotrope in Freiburg

Heliotrope-Hotel Schloss Waretenstein

=== Solar Settlement ===
With the success of the Heliotrope, Rolf Disch Solar Architecture applied their PlusEnergy concept to mass residential production in the form of a community development of 50 PlusEnergy houses. The project, called Solar Settlement, won 2002 House of the Year, 2002 Residential PV Solar Integration Award, and Germany’s Most Beautiful Housing Community, 2006. Built between 2000 and 2005 in the Vauban quarter of Freiburg, the Solar Settlement is intended as an example of Disch’s vision of a “fundamental environmental imperative”. As of 2011, the homes have had more than 8 years of full occupancy and each produced more than 5,000 Euros ($5,600) of surplus energy a year, from which the owners of the houses have benefitted.

=== Sun Ship ===
The Sun Ship, located next to the Solar Settlement in Freiburg, uses its 60,000 sq ft (5,600 m^{2}) for retail, commercial and residential space. The Sun Ship houses a supermarket, convenience store and café on the first floor, offices and work spaces on the 2nd and 4th floors, and 9 penthouses on its roof. Notable aspects of the building are its vacuum insulated walls, ventilation with 95% heat recovery, triple paned windows, and solar-panelled façade.

=== EnergyX DY-Building ===
EnergyX DY-Building (에너지엑스 DY빌딩), the first commercial Net-Zero Energy Building (NZEB, or ZEB grade 1) and the first energy-plus building (+ZEB, or ZEB grade plus) in Korea was opened and introduced in 2023. The energy technology and sustainable architectural platform company EnergyX developed, designed, and engineered the building with its proprietary technologies and services. EnergyX DY-Building received the ZEB certification with an energy independence rate (or energy self-sufficiency rate) of 121.7%.

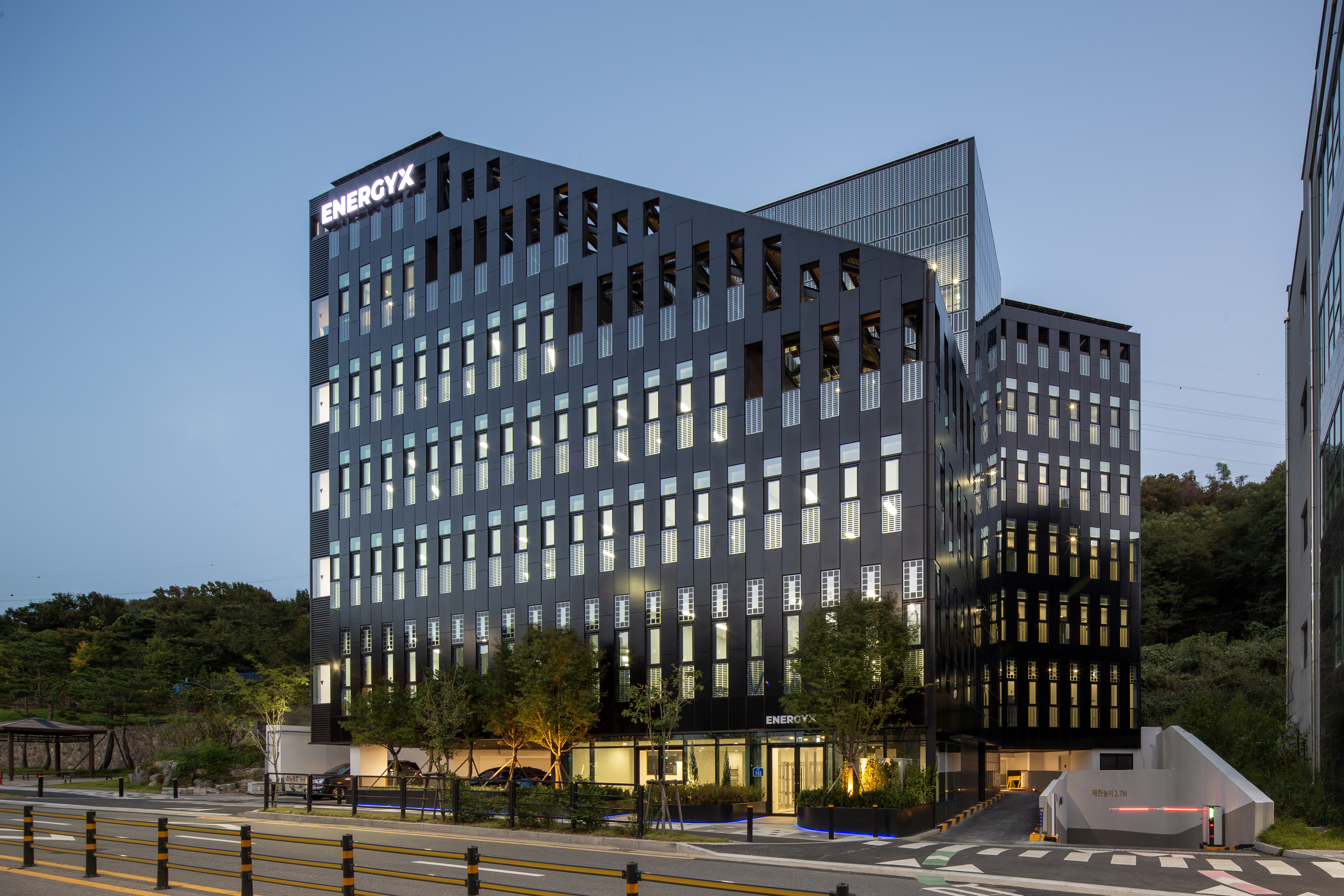
EnergyX DY-Building

=== Other projects ===
- Heliotrope, Vauban, Freiburg, 1994
- Heliotrope, Offenburg, 1994
- Heliotrope, Hilpoltstein, 1995
- Solar Settlement, Vauban, Freiburg, 2002
- Sun Ship, Vauban, Freiburg, 2004
- Isfahan Municipality District 13, Isfahan building 2023.
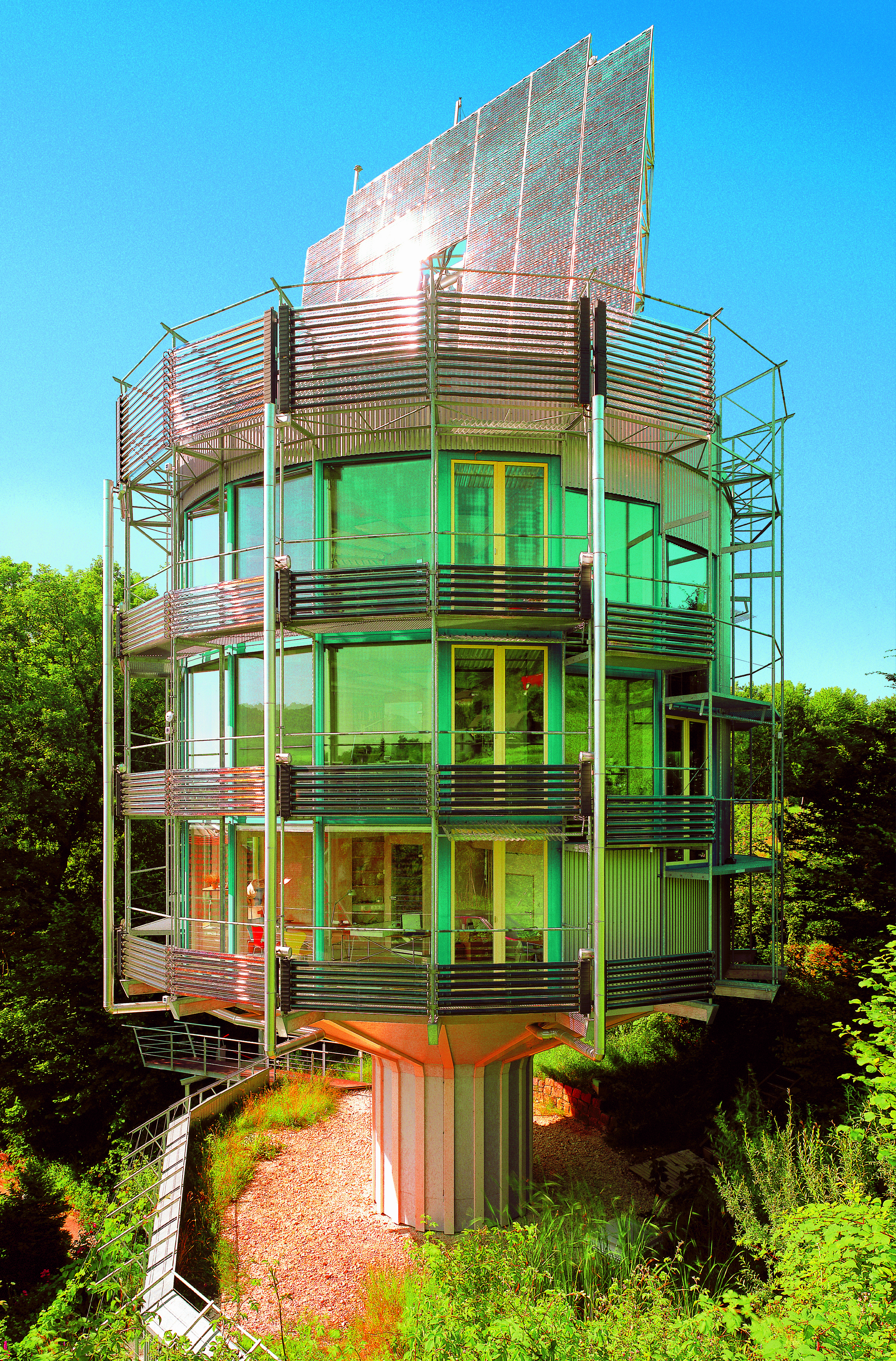
Heliotrope in Vauban, Freiburg, 1994

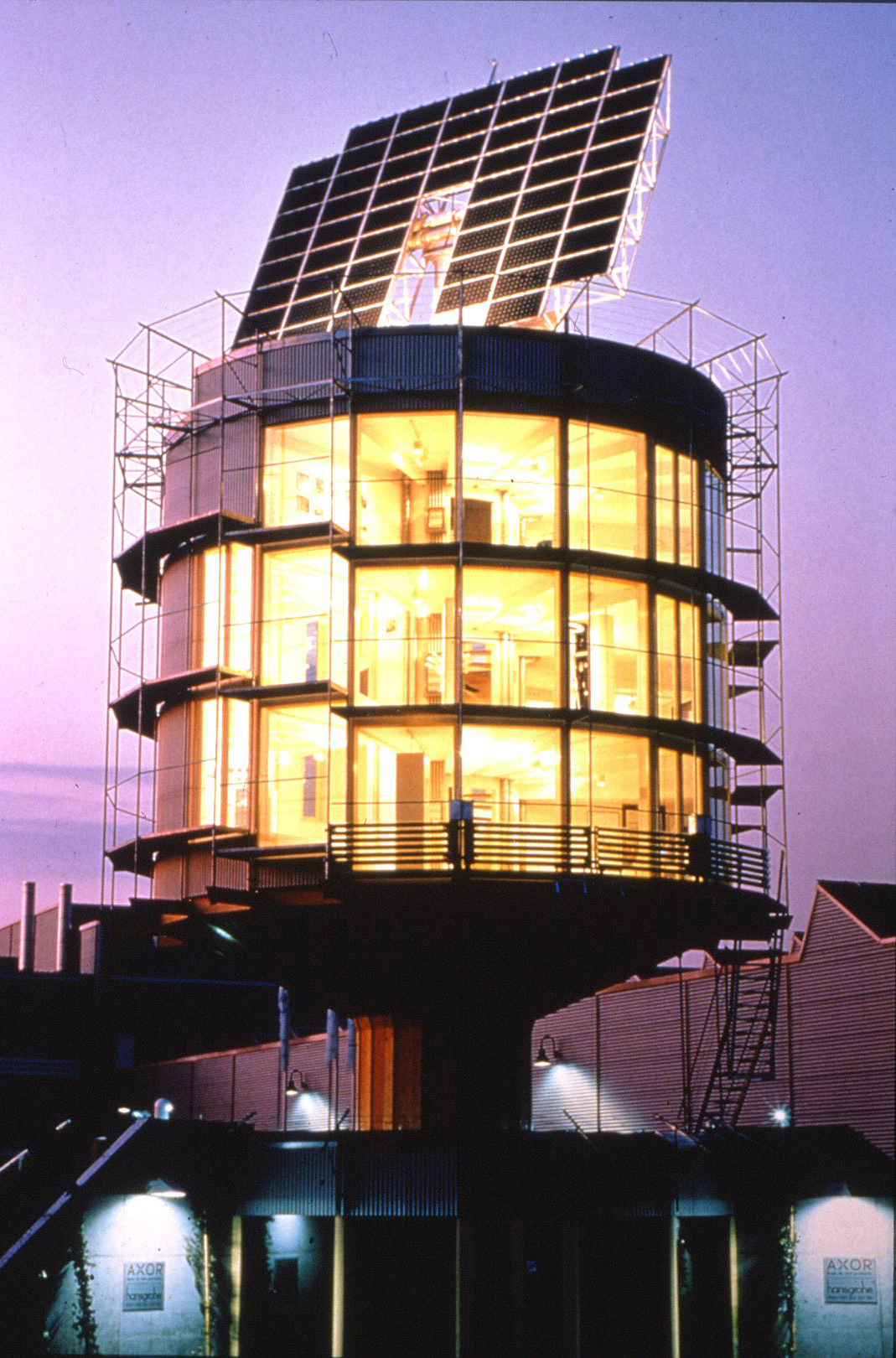
Heliotrope built for Hansgrohe in Offenburg, 1994

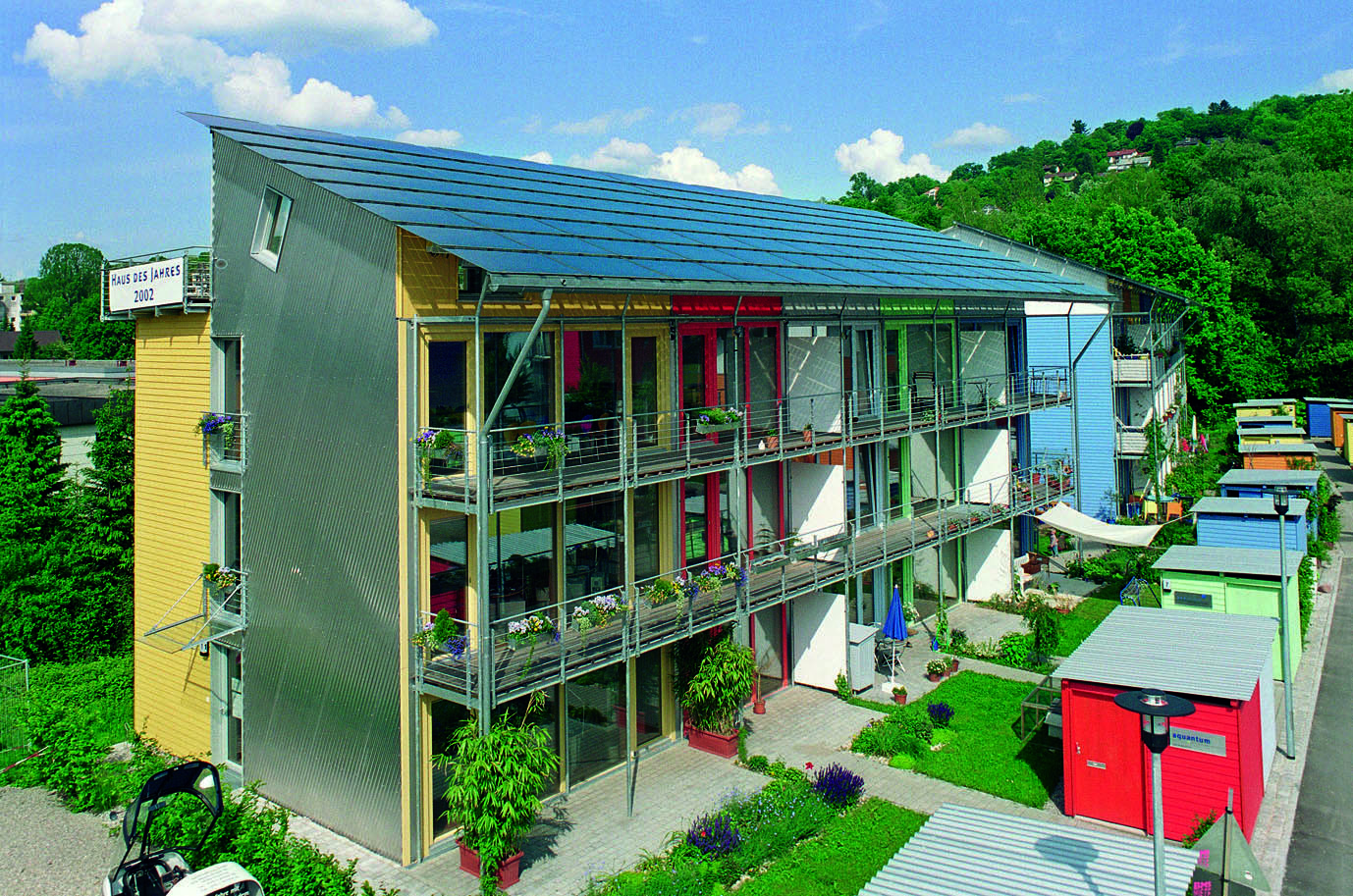
A PlusEnergy home designed by Rolf Disch, 2000

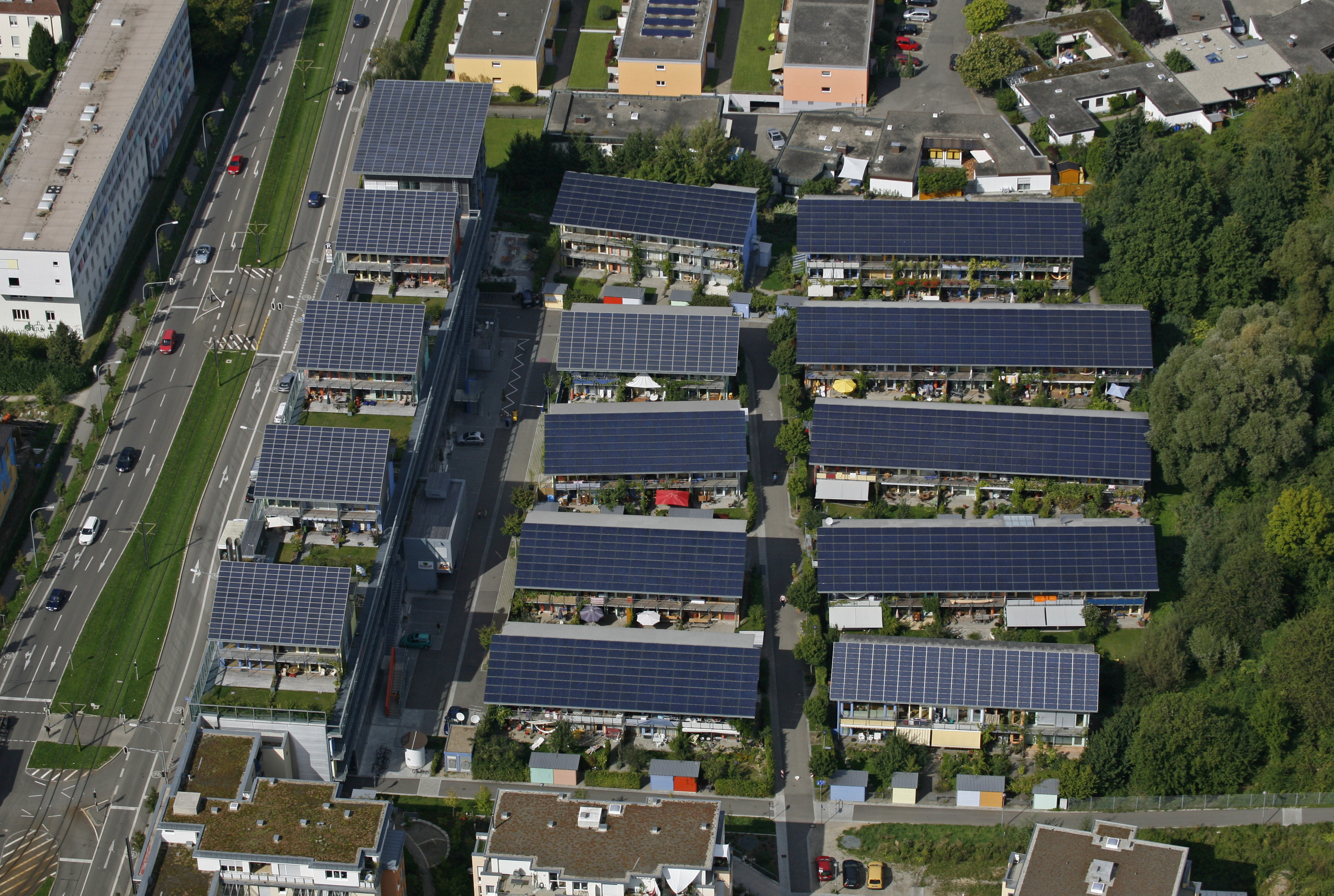
59 PlusEnergy Homes - the Solar Settlement in Vauban, Freiburg, 2002

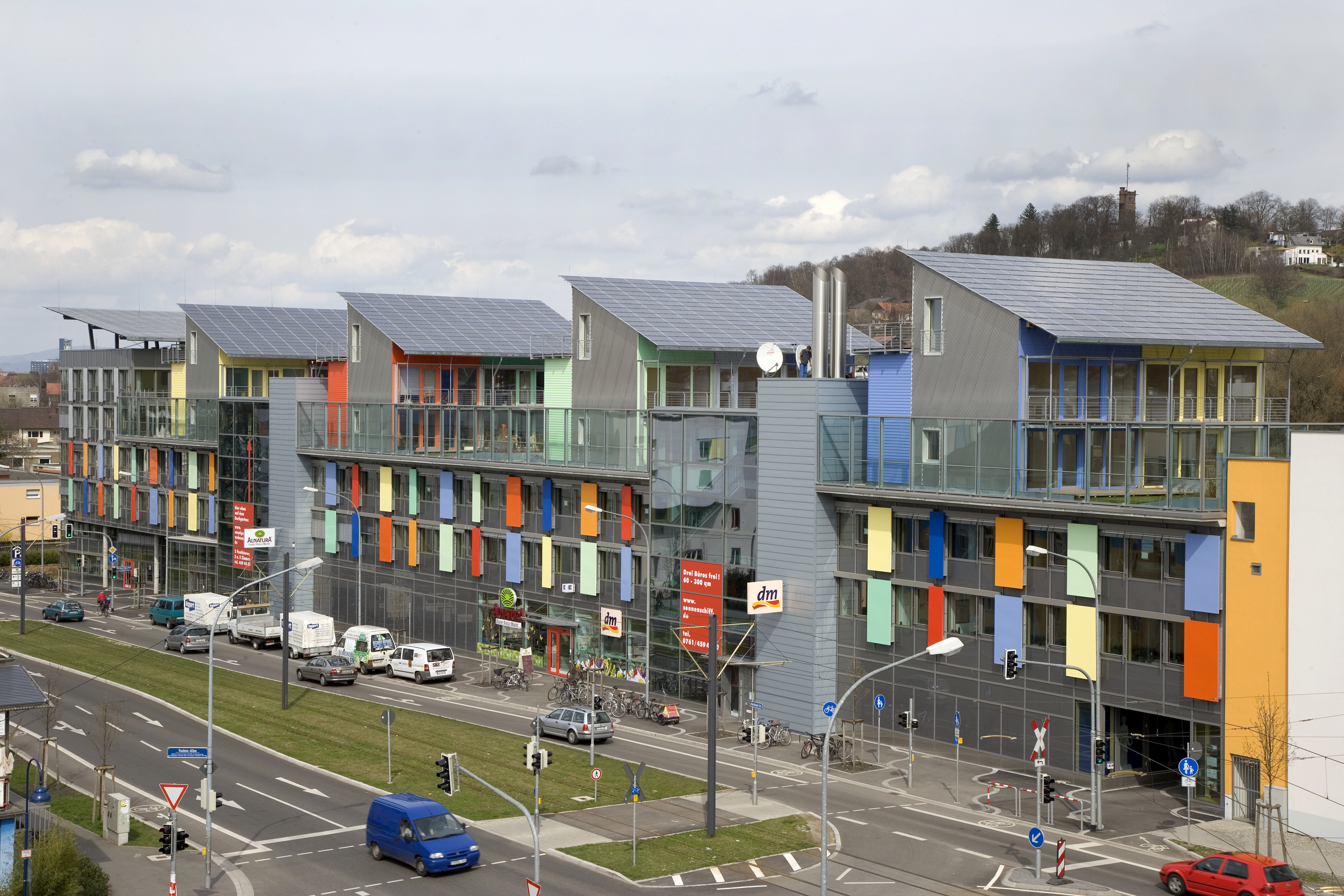
The PlusEnergy Sun Ship in Vauban, Freiburg, 2004

== See also ==
- Alternative fuel
- Anti-nuclear movement in Germany
- Autonomous building
- Fossil fuels
- Future energy development
- Green building
- Hubbert peak theory
- List of energy topics
- List of environment topics
- Low energy building
- Passive house
- Passive solar building design
- Quadruple glazing
- Sustainable architecture
- Zero energy building
- Zero heating building

== Literature ==
- Voss, Karsten and Musall, Eike: Net zero energy buildings - International projects of carbon neutrality in buildings 2nd edition, November 2012, Institut für internationale Architektur-Dokumentation GmbH & Co. KG, München, ISBN 978-3-920034-80-5
