= Vauban, Freiburg =

Neighborhood near Freiburg, Germany

Coordinates: 47°58′33″N 7°49′29″E

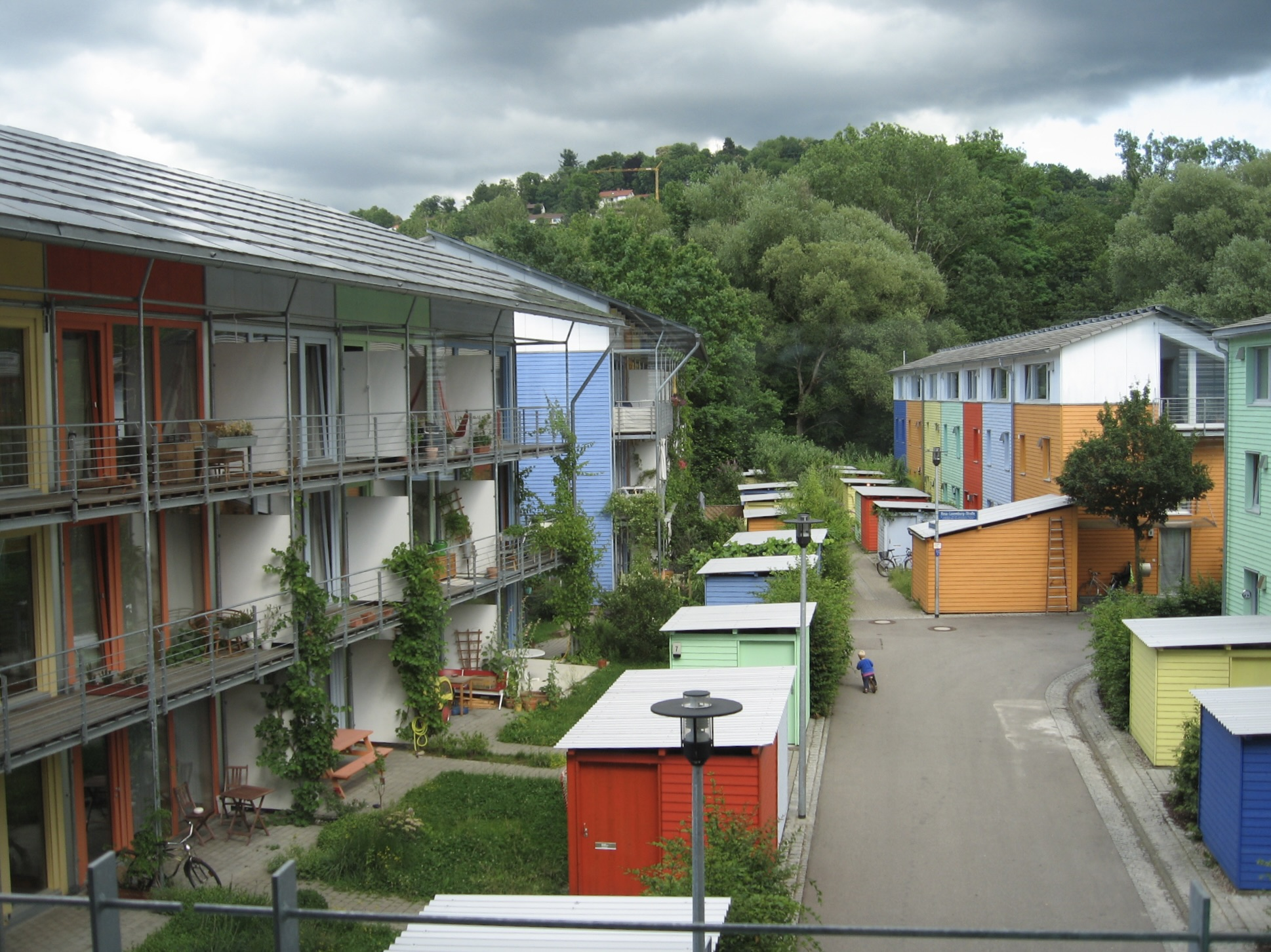
A distinct colour scheme results in a varied neighbourhood

Vauban (German pronunciation: [voˈbãː]) is a neighbourhood (Stadtteil) to the south of the town centre in Freiburg, Germany. It was built as "a sustainable model district" on the site of a former French military base named after Sébastien Le Prestre de Vauban, the 17th century French Marshal who built fortifications in Freiburg while the region was under French rule. Construction began in 1998, and the first two residents arrived in 2001.

== History ==
The site was originally developed as a military base in 1936 and was taken over after World War II by the French forces occupying the region. The military left in 1992. Over a period of some years the vacant structures were occupied by various tribes of hippies and anarchists. Following battles with the city government, squatters won the rights to four of the original twenty barracks. Some former occupants of these structures have taken up residence in a diverse assortment of cars, vans, and retired civil service vehicles, forming what has been named Wagenplatz.

At the same time a group called "Forum Vauban" was pressing the City Council to develop the site in an eco-friendly way. The remaining 38 hectares were acquired by Freiburg City Council, who delegated the mandatory community consultation to Forum Vauban. This collaboration between the Council and Forum Vauban led to the masterplan with its car-free concept.

Most of the individual plots were sold to community-led housing ('Baugruppen') groups whose bids were assessed against criteria favouring families with children, older people and Freiburg residents. Some Baugruppen were formed by architects, others by prospective residents planning varying elements of self-build. Some of the other plots were sold to private developers.

Another part of the site was developed for student dormitories for the University of Freiburg.

More "alternative" projects have, among other things, converted old barracks at a low cost, such as S.U.S.I., a self-governing independent residential initiative that, through an alternative living concept, developed living spaces for students as well as subsidized housing. A self-governing "Community Centre Building 037" (German: Stadtteilzentrum Haus 037) has been established in one of the preserved barracks. Some former barracks were occupied in early 2005, as they would have been demolished.

Vauban has 5,267 residents as of 2020.

== Transport ==
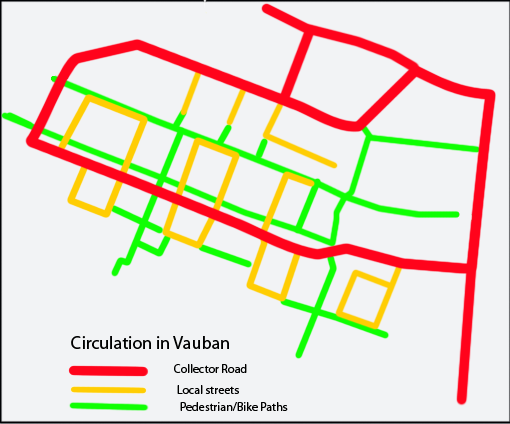
A diagrammatic depiction of the transportation network in Vauban. It shows the departure from the traditional simple grid and the adoption of a complex combination grid. The drawing shows the three types of connectors: roads in red, local streets in orange and pedestrian bicycle paths in green

Within Vauban, transport is primarily by foot or bicycle: according to Scheurer (2001), 38–73% of movements were performed by walking or cycling, as opposed to 5–16% by car. Scheurer (2001) found that cycling was the main mode of transport for most trips and most activities, including commuting and shopping. The development is connected to Freiburg city centre by a tramway and is laid out linearly along the tracks, such that all homes are within easy walking distance from a tram stop. In 2006, just after the tram network had been extended, 70% of local public transport trips were made by tram, and 30% by bus. The level of car ownership has fallen over time: "Scheurer (2001) and Nobis (2003) found that just over half of households owned a car" (Scheurer: 54%; Nobis: "over 40%" carfree), but according to Melia et al. (2010), "parking levels suggest a substantial majority of households do not own cars there today."

The preference for walking and cycling can be partly attributed to the layout of the district. Building on previous experience, the plan departs from the simple inherited grid and creates a network, which incorporates the principle of “filtered permeability”. It means that the network geometry favours the active modes of transport and, selectively, “filters out” the car. This is accomplished by reducing the number of streets that run through the neighbourhood. Instead, most local streets are crescents and cul-de-sacs (see drawing). While they are discontinuous for cars, they connect to a network of pedestrian and bike paths, which permeate the entire neighbourhood. In addition, these paths go through or past open spaces, adding to the enjoyment of the trip. The logic of filtering a mode of transport is fully expressed in a new comprehensive model for laying out neighbourhoods and districts – the Fused Grid.

Most of Vauban's residential streets are described as stellplatzfrei – literally "free from parking spaces". Vehicles are allowed down these streets at walking pace to pick up and deliver but not to park, although there are some infractions as the system depends essentially on social consensus – there are few official controls. Each year, households are required to sign a declaration stating either that they do not own a car, or that they do, in which case they must buy a space in one of the multi-storey car parks on the periphery, at a one-off cost of €17,500 plus a monthly service fee (in 2006). According to Melia (2006), "the citywide car sharing club has the greatest concentration of its 2,500 members in Vauban – at least ten of its cars are stationed around the district."

== Sustainable construction ==
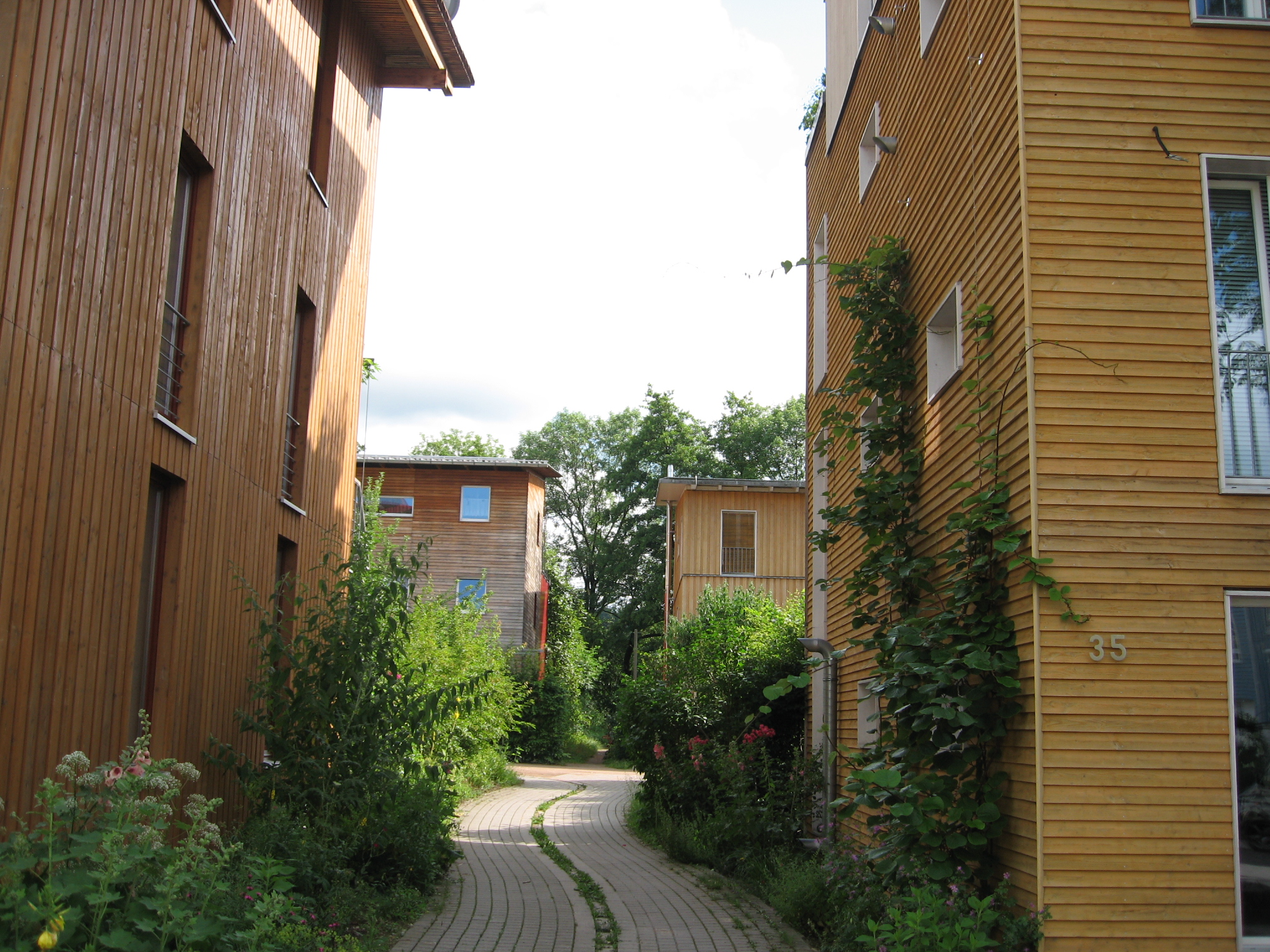
Wooden panelling on some facades

All houses are built to a low-energy consumption standard, with 100 units designed to the Passivhaus ultra-low energy building standard. Other buildings are heated by a combined heat and power station burning wood chips, while many of the buildings have solar collectors or photovoltaic cells. Perhaps the best example of sustainable building is the Solar Settlement in Vauban, a 59 PlusEnergy home housing community. It is the first housing community worldwide in which all the homes produce a positive energy balance. The solar energy surplus is then sold back into the city's grid for a profit on every home.

== See also ==
- Green building
- Sustainable design
- Sustainable development
- List of carfree places
- Car-free movement
- Effects of the automobile on societies

== Sources ==
- Melia, Steve (2006). "On the Road to Sustainability - Transport and Carfree Living in Freiburg" (PDF). Report for W.H.O. Healthy Cities Collaborating Centre edn. University of the West of England, Bristol.
- Melia, Steve; Parkhurst, Graham; Barton, Hugh (August 2010). "Carfree, low-car – What's the Difference?" (PDF). World Transport Policy and Practice 16. 16 (2). Eco-Logica Ltd.: 24–32. Archived from the original on 1 June 2013.
