= Autonomous building =

Building designed to be independent from public infrastructure

An autonomous building is a hypothetical building designed to be operated independently from infrastructural support services such as the electric power grid, gas grid, municipal water systems, sewage treatment systems, storm drains, communication services, and in some cases, public roads. The literature mostly refers to housing, or the autonomous house.

Advocates of autonomous building describe advantages that include reduced environmental impacts, increased security, and lower costs of ownership. Some cited advantages satisfy tenets of green building, not independence per se (see below). Off-grid buildings often rely very little on civil services and are therefore safer and more comfortable during civil disaster or military attacks. For example, off-grid buildings would not lose power or water if public supplies were compromised.

== History ==
=== 1970s ===
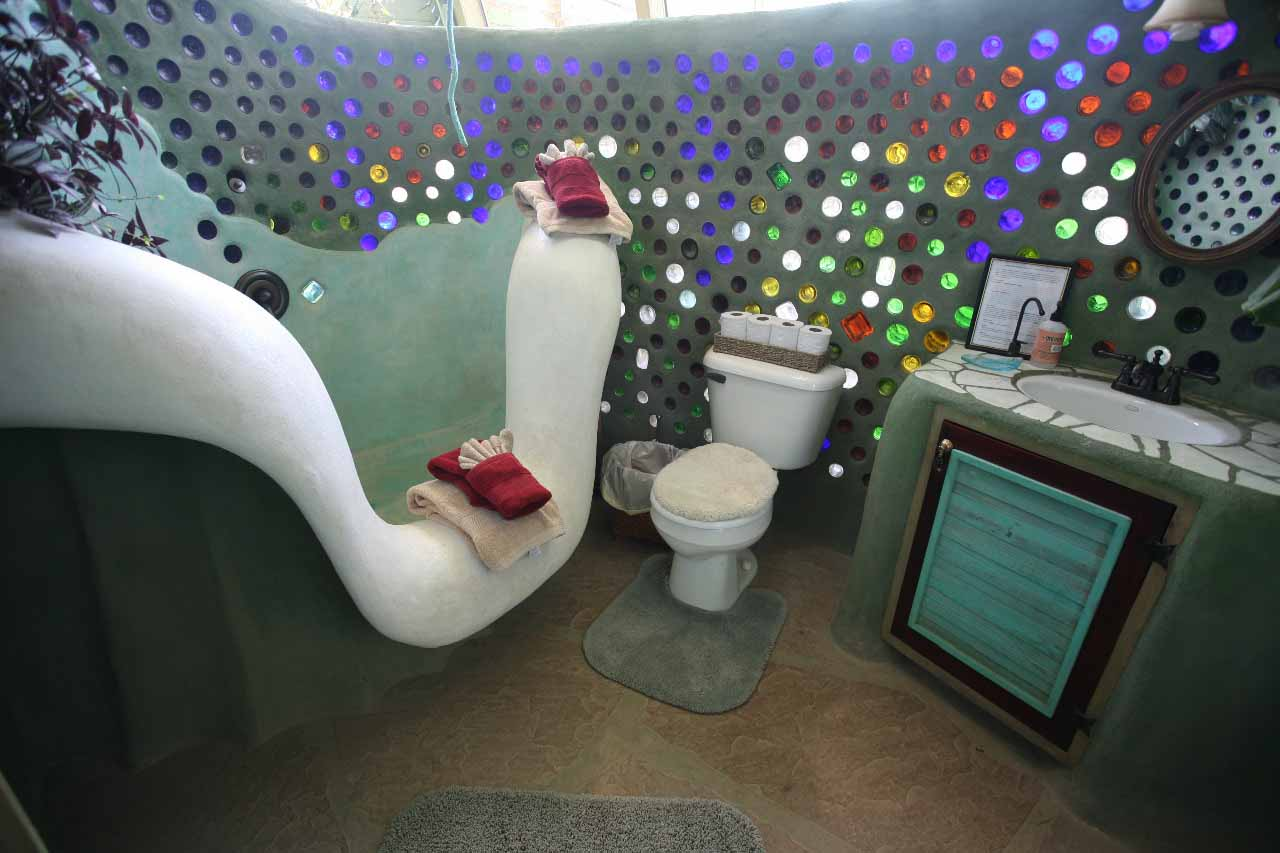
The bathroom of an Earthship, featuring a recycled bottle wall

In the 1970s, groups of activists and engineers were inspired by the warnings of imminent resource depletion and starvation. In the United States, a group calling themselves the New Alchemists were famous for the depth of research effort placed in their projects. Using conventional construction techniques, they designed a series of "bioshelter" projects, the most famous of which was The Ark bioshelter community for Prince Edward Island. They published the plans for all of these, with detailed design calculations and blueprints. The Ark used wind-based water pumping and electricity and was self-contained in food production. It had living quarters for people, fish tanks raising tilapia for protein, a greenhouse watered with fish water, and a closed-loop sewage reclamation system that recycled human waste into sanitized fertilizer for the fish tanks.

Around 1975–1977, Australian architect and lecturer at University of Sydney School of Architecture, Col James, in collaboration with urban designer, architect, artist, and university tutor Nick Hollo, designed and built an autonomous house on university grounds, in collaboration with students. This taught self-build sustainability to hundreds of students.

=== 1990s ===
The 1990s saw the development of Earthships, similar in intent to the Ark project, but organised as a for-profit venture, with construction details published in a series of three books by American architect Mike Reynolds. The building material is tires filled with earth. This makes a wall that has large amounts of thermal mass (see earth sheltering). Berms are placed on exposed surfaces to further increase the house's temperature stability. The water system starts with rain water, processed for drinking, then washing, then plant watering, then toilet flushing, and finally black water is recycled again for more plant watering. The cisterns are placed and used as thermal masses. Power, including electricity, heat and water heating, is from solar power.

Some 1990s architects such as William McDonough and Ken Yeang applied environmentally responsible building design to large commercial buildings, such as office buildings, making them largely self-sufficient in energy production. One major bank building (ING Group's Amsterdam headquarters) in the Netherlands was constructed to be autonomous and artistic as well.

=== 2000s ===
In 2002, British architects Brenda and Robert Vale wrote:

It is quite possible in all parts of Australia to construct a 'house with no bills', which would be comfortable without heating and cooling, which would make its own electricity, collect its own water and deal with its own waste...These houses can be built now, using off-the-shelf techniques. It is possible to build a "house with no bills" for the same price as a conventional house, but it would be (25%) smaller.

== Advantages ==
As an architect or engineer becomes more concerned with the disadvantages of transportation networks, and dependence on distant resources, their designs tend to include more autonomous elements. The historic path to autonomy was a concern for secure sources of heat, power, water and food. A nearly parallel path toward autonomy has been to start with a concern for environmental impacts, which cause disadvantages.

Autonomous buildings can increase security and reduce environmental impacts by using on-site resources (such as sunlight and rain) that would otherwise be wasted. Autonomy often dramatically reduces the costs and impacts of networks that serve the building, because autonomy short-circuits the multiplying inefficiencies of collecting and transporting resources. Other impacted resources, such as oil reserves and the retention of the local watershed, can often be cheaply conserved by thoughtful designs.

Autonomous buildings are usually energy-efficient in operation, and therefore cost-efficient, for the obvious reason that smaller energy needs are easier to satisfy off-grid. But they may substitute energy production or other techniques to avoid diminishing returns in extreme conservation.

An autonomous structure is not always environmentally friendly. The goal of independence from support systems is associated with, but not identical to, other goals of environmentally responsible green building. However, autonomous buildings also usually include some degree of sustainability through the use of renewable energy and other renewable resources, producing no more greenhouse gases than they consume, and other measures.

== Disadvantages ==
First and fundamentally, independence is a matter of degree. For example, eliminating dependence on the electrical grid is relatively easy. In contrast, running an efficient, reliable food source can be a chore.

Living within an autonomous shelter may also require sacrifices in lifestyle or social opportunities. Even the most comfortable and technologically advanced autonomous homes could require alterations of residents' behavior. Some may not welcome the extra chores. The Vails described some clients' experiences as inconvenient, irritating, isolating, or even as an unwanted full-time job. A well-designed building can reduce this issue, but usually at the expense of reduced autonomy.

An autonomous house must be custom-built (or extensively retrofitted) to suit the climate and location. Passive solar techniques, alternative toilet and sewage systems, thermal massing designs, basement battery systems, efficient windowing, and the array of other design tactics require some degree of non-standard construction, added expense, ongoing experimentation and maintenance, and also have an effect on the psychology of the space.

== Systems ==
=== Water ===
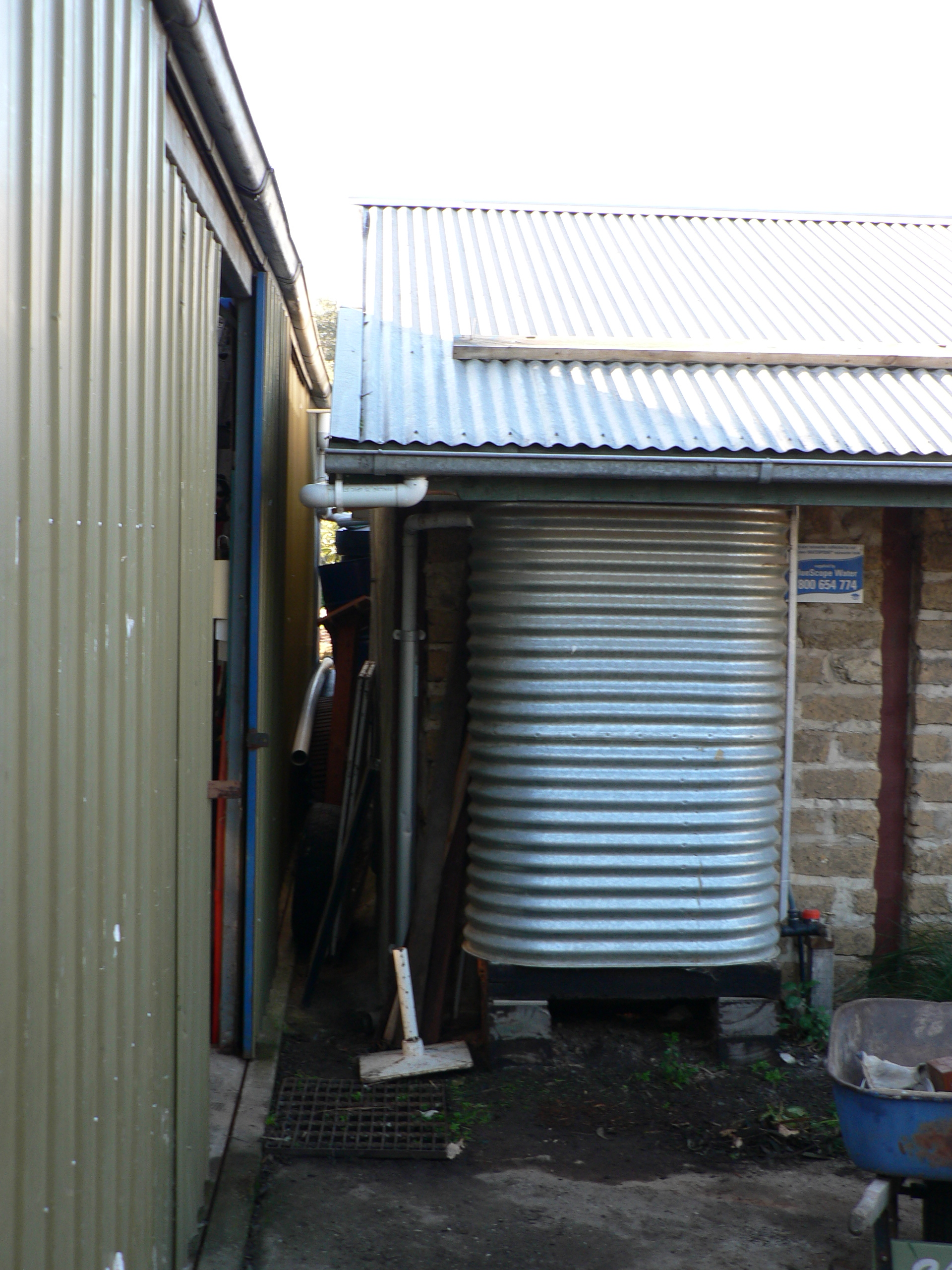
A domestic rainwater harvesting system

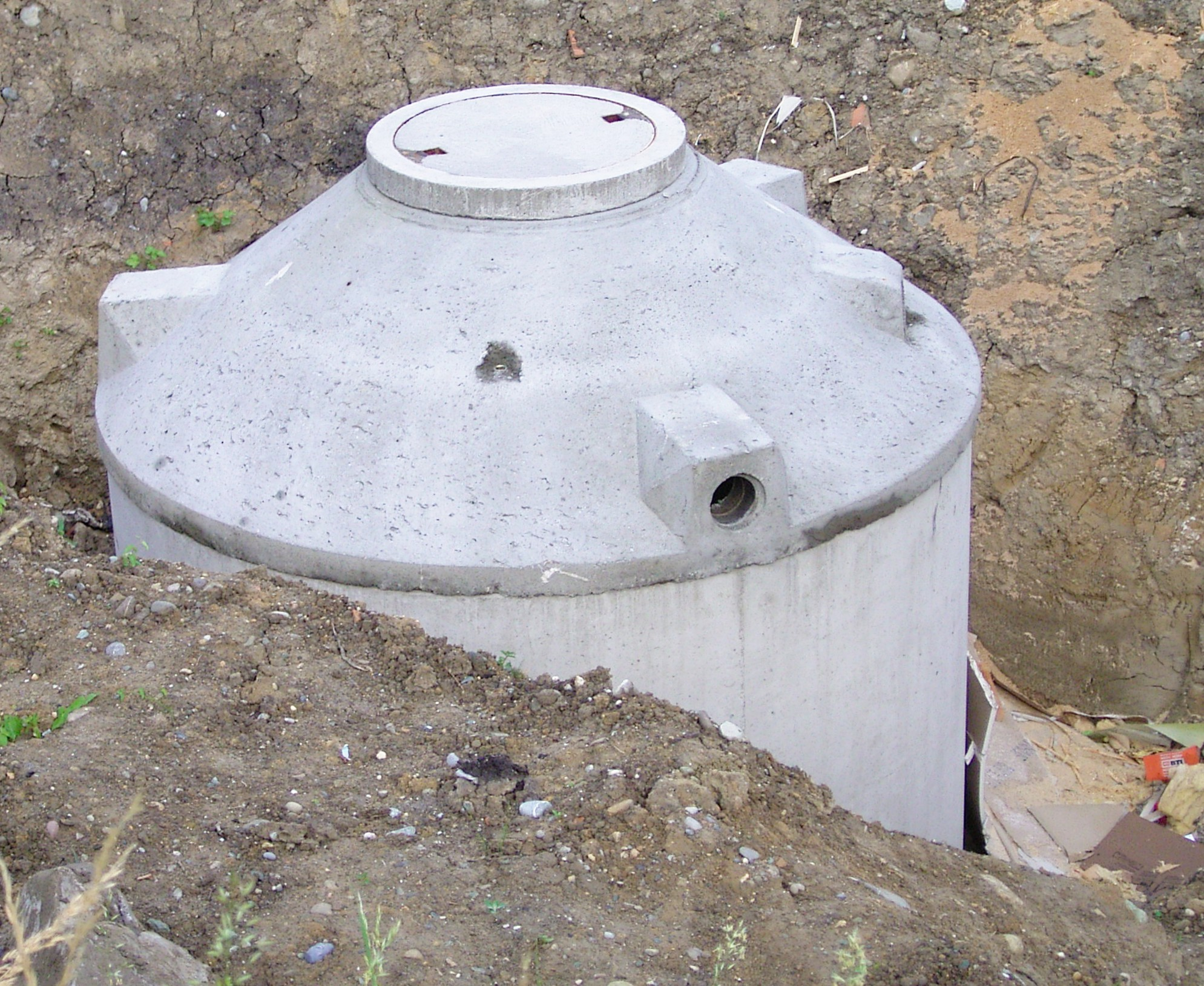
A concrete under-floor cistern being installed

There are many methods of collecting and conserving water. Use reduction is cost-effective.

Greywater systems reuse drained wash water to flush toilets or to water lawns and gardens. Greywater systems can halve the water use of most residential buildings; however, they require the purchase of a sump, greywater pressurization pump, and secondary plumbing. Some builders are installing waterless urinals and even composting toilets that eliminate water usage in sewage disposal.

The classic solution with minimal life-style changes is using a well. Once drilled, a well-foot requires substantial power. However, advanced well-foots can reduce power usage by twofold or more from older models. Well water can be contaminated in some areas. The Sono arsenic filter eliminates unhealthy arsenic in well water. However drilling a well is an uncertain activity, with aquifers depleted in some areas. It can also be expensive.

In regions with sufficient rainfall, it is often more economical to design a building to use rainwater harvesting, with supplementary water deliveries in a drought. Rain water makes excellent soft washwater, but needs antibacterial treatment. If used for drinking, mineral supplements or mineralization is necessary.

Most desert and temperate climates get at least 250 millimetres (9.8 in) of rain per year. This means that a typical one-story house with a greywater system can supply its year-round water needs from its roof alone. In the driest areas, it might require a cistern of 30 cubic metres (7,900 US gal). Many areas average 13 millimetres (0.51 in) of rain per week, and these can use a cistern as small as 10 cubic metres (2,600 US gal).

In many areas, it is difficult to keep a roof clean enough for drinking. To reduce dirt and bad tastes, systems use a metal collecting-roof and a "roof cleaner" tank that diverts the first 40 liters. Cistern water is usually chlorinated, though reverse osmosis systems provide even better quality drinking water.

In the classic Roman house ("Domus"), household water was provided from a cistern (the "impluvium"), which was a decorative feature of the atrium, the house's main public space. It was fed by downspout tiles from the inward-facing roof-opening (the "compluvium"). Often water lilies were grown in it to purify the water. Wealthy households often supplemented the rain with a small fountain fed from a city's cistern. The impluvium always had an overflow drain so it could not flood the house.

Modern cisterns are usually large plastic tanks. Gravity tanks on short towers are reliable, so pump repairs are less urgent. The least expensive bulk cistern is a fenced pond or pool at ground level.

Reducing autonomy reduces the size and expense of cisterns. Many autonomous homes can reduce water use below 10 US gallons (38 L) per person per day, so that in a drought a month of water can be delivered inexpensively via truck. Self-delivery is often possible by installing fabric water tanks that fit the bed of a pick-up truck.

It can be convenient to use the cistern as a heat sink or trap for a heat pump or air conditioning system; however this can make cold drinking water warm, and in drier years may decrease the efficiency of the HVAC system.

Solar stills can efficiently produce drinking water from ditch water or cistern water, especially high-efficiency multiple effect humidification designs, which separate the evaporator(s) and condenser(s).

New technologies, like reverse osmosis can create unlimited amounts of pure water from polluted water, ocean water, and even from humid air. Watermakers are available for yachts that convert seawater and electricity into potable water and brine. Atmospheric water generators extract moisture from dry desert air and filter it to pure water.

=== Sewage ===
==== Resource ====
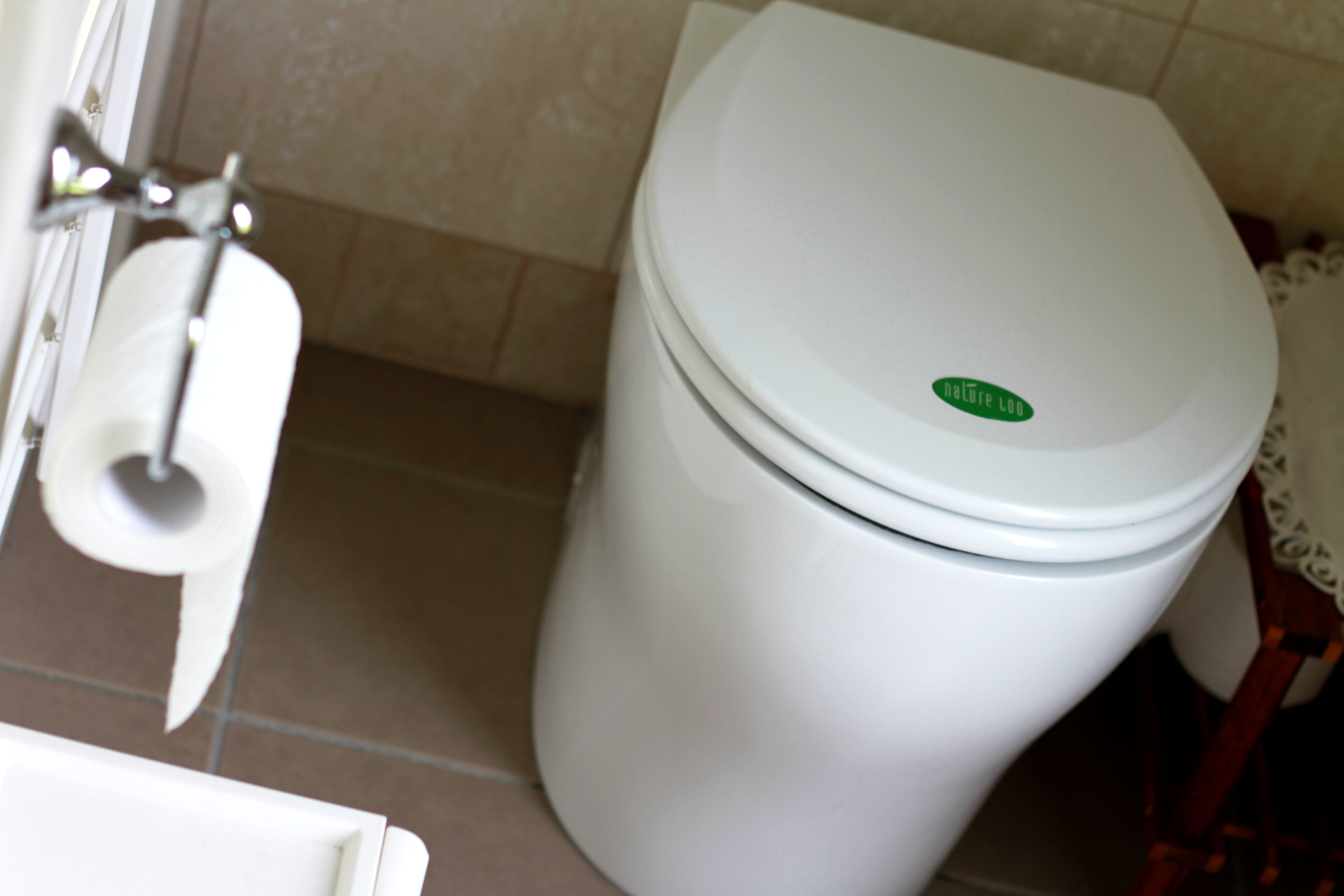
A composting toilet

Composting toilets use bacteria to decompose human feces into useful, odourless, sanitary compost. The process is sanitary because soil bacteria eat the human pathogens as well as most of the mass of the waste. Nevertheless, most health authorities forbid direct use of "humanure" for growing food. The risk is microbial and viral contamination, as well as heavy metal toxicity. In a dry composting toilet, the waste is evaporated or digested to gas (mostly carbon dioxide) and vented, so a toilet produces only a few pounds of compost every six months. To control the odor, modern toilets use a small fan to keep the toilet under negative pressure, and exhaust the gasses to a vent pipe.

Some home sewage treatment systems use biological treatment, usually beds of plants and aquaria, that absorb nutrients and bacteria and convert greywater and sewage to clear water. This odor- and color-free reclaimed water can be used to flush toilets and water outside plants. When tested, it approaches standards for potable water. In climates that freeze, the plants and aquaria need to be kept in a small greenhouse space. Good systems need about as much care as a large aquarium.

Electric incinerating toilets turn excrement into a small amount of ash. They are cool to the touch, have no water and no pipes, and require an air vent in a wall. They are used in remote areas where use of septic tanks is limited, usually to reduce nutrient loads in lakes.

NASA's bioreactor is an extremely advanced biological sewage system. It can turn sewage into air and water through microbial action. NASA plans to use it in the crewed Mars mission. Another method is NASA's urine-to-water distillation system. A big disadvantage of complex biological sewage treatment systems is that if the house is empty, the sewage system biota may starve to death.

==== Waste ====
Sewage handling is essential for public health. Many diseases are transmitted by poorly functioning sewage systems.

The standard system is a tiled leach field combined with a septic tank. The basic idea is to provide a small system with primary sewage treatment. Sludge settles to the bottom of the septic tank, is partially reduced by anaerobic digestion, and fluid is dispersed in the leach field. The leach field is usually under a yard growing grass. Septic tanks can operate entirely by gravity, and if well managed, are reasonably safe.

Septic tanks have to be pumped periodically by a vacuum truck to eliminate non reducing solids. Failure to pump a septic tank can cause overflow that damages the leach field, and contaminates ground water. Septic tanks may also require some lifestyle changes, such as not using garbage disposals, minimizing fluids flushed into the tank, and minimizing non-digestible solids flushed into the tank. For example, septic safe toilet paper is recommended. However, septic tanks remain popular because they permit standard plumbing fixtures, and require few or no lifestyle sacrifices.

Composting or packaging toilets make it economical and sanitary to throw away sewage as part of the normal garbage collection service. They also reduce water use by half, and eliminate the difficulty and expense of septic tanks. However, they require the local landfill to use sanitary practices.

Incinerator systems are quite practical. The ashes are biologically safe, and less than 1/10 the volume of the original waste, but like all incinerator waste, are usually classified as hazardous waste.

Traditional methods of sewage handling include pit toilets, latrines, and outhouses. These can be safe, inexpensive and practical. They are still used in many regions.

=== Storm drains ===
Drainage systems are a crucial compromise between human habitability and a secure, sustainable watershed. Paved areas and lawns or turf do not allow much precipitation to filter through the ground to recharge aquifers. They can cause flooding and damage in neighbourhoods, as the water flows over the surface towards a low point.

Typically, elaborate, capital-intensive storm sewer networks are engineered to deal with stormwater. In some cities, such as the Victorian era London sewers or much of the old City of Toronto, the storm water system is combined with the sanitary sewer system. In the event of heavy precipitation, the load on the sewage treatment plant at the end of the pipe becomes too great to handle and raw sewage is dumped into holding tanks, and sometimes into surface water.

Autonomous buildings can address precipitation in a number of ways. If a water-absorbing swale for each yard is combined with permeable concrete streets, storm drains can be omitted from the neighbourhood. This can save more than $800 per house (1970s) by eliminating storm drains. One way to use the savings is to purchase larger lots, which permits more amenities at the same cost. Permeable concrete is an established product in warm climates, and in development for freezing climates. In freezing climates, the elimination of storm drains can often still pay for enough land to construct swales (shallow water collecting ditches) or water impeding berms instead. This plan provides more land for homeowners and can offer more interesting topography for landscaping. Additionally, a green roof captures precipitation and uses the water to grow plants. It can be built into a new building or used to replace an existing roof.

=== Electricity ===
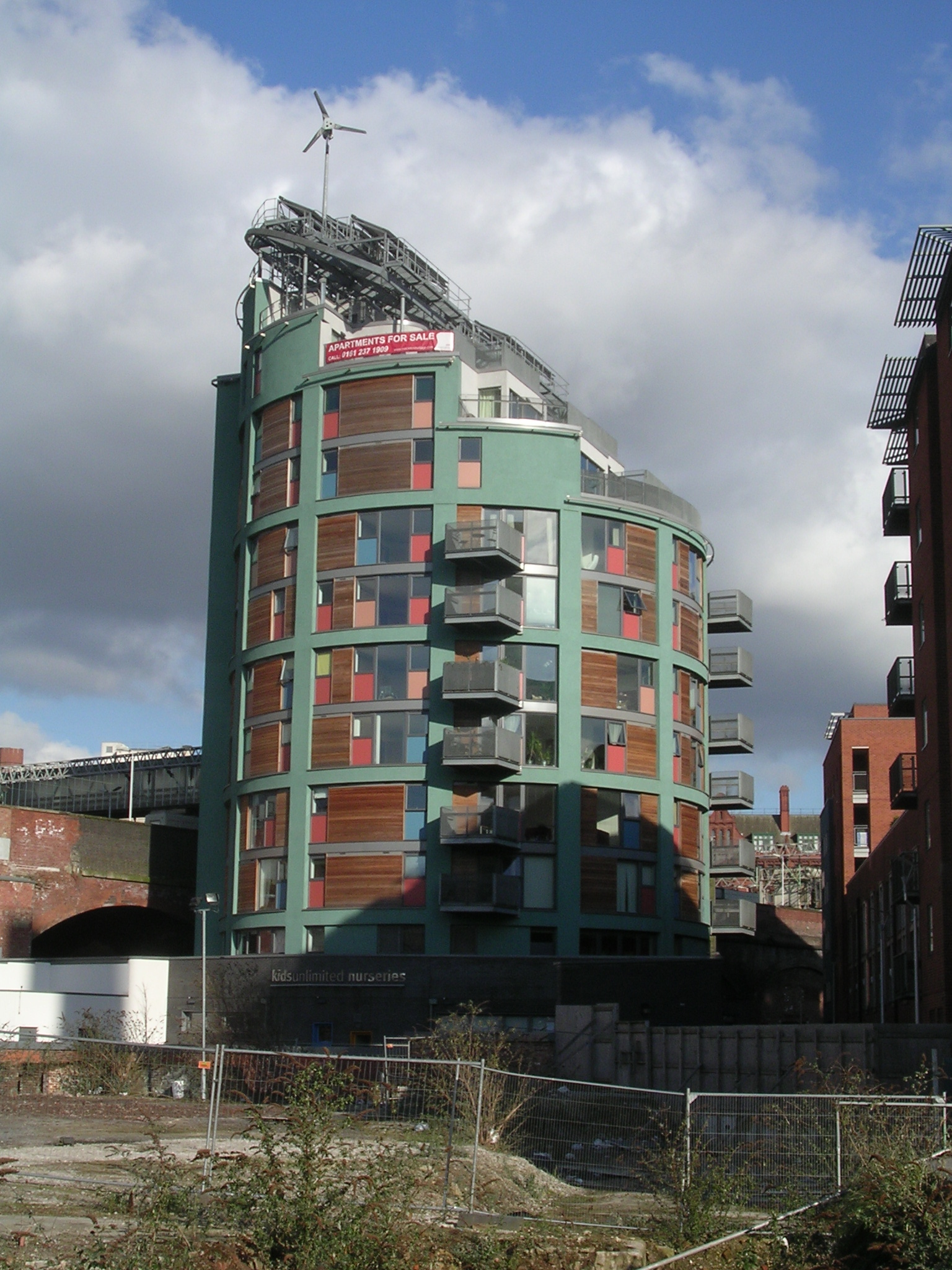
Wind turbine on the roof in Manchester, UK

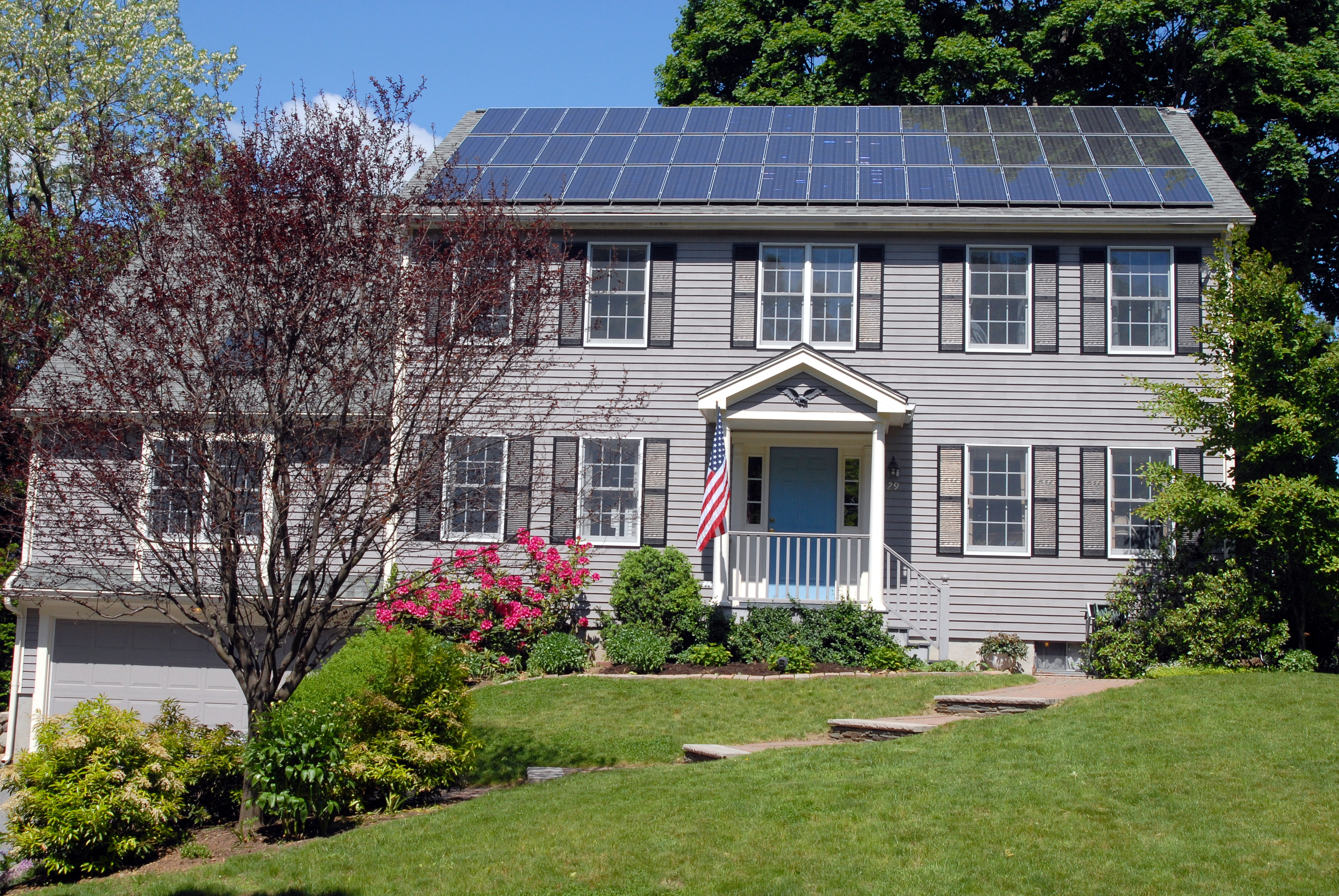
A PV-solar system

Since electricity is an expensive utility, the first step towards autonomy is to design a house and lifestyle to reduce demand. LED lights, laptop computers and gas-powered refrigerators save electricity, although gas-powered refrigerators are not very efficient. There are also superefficient electric refrigerators, such as those produced by the Sun Frost company, some of which use only about half as much electricity as a mass-market energy star-rated refrigerator.

Using a solar roof, solar cells can provide electric power. Solar roofs can be more cost-effective than retrofitted solar power, because buildings need roofs anyway. Modern solar cells last about 40 years, which makes them a reasonable investment in some areas. At a sufficient angle, solar cells are cleaned by run-off rain water and therefore have almost no life-style impact.

Many areas have long winter nights or dark cloudy days. In these climates, a solar installation might not pay for itself or large battery storage systems are necessary to achieve electric self-sufficiency. In stormy or windy climates, wind turbines can replace or significantly supplement solar power. The average autonomous house needs only one small wind turbine, 5 metres or less in diameter. On a 30-metre (100-foot) tower, this turbine can provide enough power to supplement solar power on cloudy days. Commercially available wind turbines use sealed, one-moving-part AC generators and passive, self-feathering blades for years of operation without service.

The main advantage of wind power is that larger wind turbines have a lower per-watt cost than solar cells, provided there is wind. Turbine location is critical: just as some locations lack sun for solar cells, many areas lack enough wind to make a turbine pay for itself. In the Great Plains of the United States, a 10-metre (33-foot) turbine can supply enough energy to heat and cool a well-built all-electric house. Economic use in other areas requires research, and possibly a site survey.

Some sites have access to a stream with a change in elevation. These sites can use small hydropower systems to generate electricity. If the difference in elevation is above 30 metres (100 feet), and the stream runs in all seasons, this can provide continuous power with a small, inexpensive installation. Lower changes of elevation require larger installations or dams, and can be less efficient. Clogging at the turbine intake can be a practical problem. The usual solution is a small pool and waterfall (a penstock) to carry away floating debris. Another solution is to utilize a turbine that resists debris, such as a Gorlov helical turbine or Ossberger turbine.

During times of low demand, excess power can be stored in batteries for future use. However, batteries need to be replaced every few years. In many areas, battery expenses can be eliminated by attaching the building to the electric power grid and operating the power system with net metering. Utility permission is required, but such cooperative generation is legally mandated in some areas (for example, California).

A grid-based building is less autonomous, but more economical and sustainable with fewer lifestyle sacrifices. In rural areas the grid's cost and impacts can be reduced by using single-wire earth return systems (for example, the MALT-system).

In areas that lack access to the grid, battery size can be reduced with a generator to recharge the batteries during energy droughts such as extended fogs. Auxiliary generators are usually run from propane, natural gas, or sometimes diesel. An hour of charging usually provides a day of operation. Modern residential chargers permit the user to set the charging times, so the generator is quiet at night. Some generators automatically test themselves once per week.

Recent advances in passively stable magnetic bearings may someday permit inexpensive storage of power in a flywheel in a vacuum. Research groups like Canada's Ballard Power Systems are also working to develop a "regenerative fuel cell", a device that can generate hydrogen and oxygen when power is available, and combine these efficiently when power is needed.

Earth batteries tap electric currents in the earth called telluric current. They can be installed anywhere in the ground. They provide only low voltages and current. They were used to power telegraphs in the 19th century. As appliance efficiencies increase, they may become practical.

Microbial fuel cells and thermoelectric generators allow electricity to be generated from biomass. The plant can be dried, chopped and converted or burned as a whole, or it can be left alive so that waste saps from the plant can be converted by bacteria.

=== Heating ===
Schematic of an active solar heating system

Most autonomous buildings are designed to use insulation, thermal mass and passive solar heating and cooling. Examples of these are trombe walls and other technologies as skylights.

Passive solar heating can heat most buildings in even the mild and chilly climates. In colder climates, extra construction costs can be as little as 15% more than new, conventional buildings. In warm climates, those having less than two weeks of frosty nights per year, there is no cost impact. The basic requirement for passive solar heating is that the solar collectors must face the prevailing sunlight (south in the Northern Hemisphere, north in the Southern Hemisphere), and the building must incorporate thermal mass to keep it warm in the night.

A recent, somewhat experimental solar heating system "Annualized geo solar heating" is practical even in regions that get little or no sunlight in winter. It uses the ground beneath a building for thermal mass. Precipitation can carry away the heat, so the ground is shielded with 6 m skirts of plastic insulation. The thermal mass of this system is sufficiently inexpensive and large that it can store enough summer heat to warm a building for the whole winter, and enough winter cold to cool the building in summer.

In annualized geo solar systems, the solar collector is often separate from (and hotter or colder than) the living space. The building may actually be constructed from insulation, for example, straw-bale construction. Some buildings have been aerodynamically designed so that convection via ducts and interior spaces eliminates any need for electric fans.

A more modest "daily solar" design is practical. For example, for about a 15% premium in building costs, the Passivhaus building codes in Europe use high performance insulating windows, R-30 insulation, HRV ventilation, and a small thermal mass. With modest changes in the building's position, modern krypton- or argon-insulated windows permit normal-looking windows to provide passive solar heat without compromising insulation or structural strength. If a small heater is available for the coldest nights, a slab or basement cistern can inexpensively provide the required thermal mass. Passivhaus building codes, in particular, bring unusually good interior air quality, because the buildings change the air several times per hour, passing it through a heat exchanger to keep heat inside.

In all systems, a small supplementary heater increases personal security and reduces lifestyle impacts for a small reduction of autonomy. The two most popular heaters for ultra-high-efficiency houses are a small heat pump, which also provides air conditioning, or a central hydronic (radiator) air heater with water recirculating from the water heater. Passivhaus designs usually integrate the heater with the ventilation system.

Earth sheltering and windbreaks can also reduce the absolute amount of heat needed by a building. Several feet below the earth, temperature ranges from 4 °C (39 °F) in North Dakota to 26 °C (79 °F), in Southern Florida. Wind breaks reduce the amount of heat carried away from a building.

Rounded, aerodynamic buildings also lose less heat.

An increasing number of commercial buildings use a combined cycle with cogeneration to provide heating, often water heating, from the output of a natural gas reciprocating engine, gas turbine or stirling electric generator.

Houses designed to cope with interruptions in civil services generally incorporate a wood stove, or heat and power from diesel fuel or bottled gas, regardless of their other heating mechanisms.

Electric heaters and electric stoves may provide pollution-free heat (depending on the power source), but use large amounts of electricity. If enough electricity is provided by solar panels, wind turbines, or other means, then electric heaters and stoves become a practical autonomous design.

=== Water heating ===
Hot water heat recycling units recover heat from water drain lines. They increase a building's autonomy by decreasing the heat or fuel used to heat water. They are attractive because they have no lifestyle changes.

Current practical, comfortable domestic water-heating systems combine a solar preheating system with a thermostatic gas-powered flow-through heater, so that the temperature of the water is consistent, and the amount is unlimited. This reduces life-style impacts at some cost in autonomy.

Solar water heaters can save large amounts of fuel. Also, small changes in lifestyle, such as doing laundry, dishes and bathing on sunny days, can greatly increase their efficiency. Pure solar heaters are especially useful for laundries, swimming pools and external baths, because these can be scheduled for use on sunny days.

The basic trick in a solar water heating system is to use a well-insulated holding tank. Some systems are vacuum- insulated, acting something like large thermos bottles. The tank is filled with hot water on sunny days, and made available at all times. Unlike a conventional tank water heater, the tank is filled only when there is sunlight. Good storage makes a smaller, higher-technology collector feasible. Such collectors can use relatively exotic technologies, such as vacuum insulation, and reflective concentration of sunlight.

Cogeneration systems produce hot water from waste heat. They usually get the heat from the exhaust of a generator or fuel cell.

Heat recycling, cogeneration and solar pre-heating can save 50–75% of the gas otherwise used. Also, some combinations provide redundant reliability by having several sources of heat. Some authorities advocate replacing bottled gas or natural gas with biogas. However, this is usually impractical unless live-stock are on-site. The wastes of a single family are usually insufficient to produce enough methane for anything more than small amounts of cooking.

=== Cooling ===
Annualized geo solar buildings often have buried, sloped water-tight skirts of insulation that extend 6 metres (20 ft) from the foundations, to prevent heat leakage between the earth used as thermal mass, and the surface.

Less dramatic improvements are possible. Windows can be shaded in summer. Eaves can be overhung to provide the necessary shade. These also shade the walls of the house, reducing cooling costs.

Another trick is to cool the building's thermal mass at night, perhaps with a whole-house fan and then cool the building from the thermal mass during the day. It helps to be able to route cold air from a sky-facing radiator (perhaps an air heating solar collector with an alternate purpose) or evaporative cooler directly through the thermal mass. On clear nights, even in tropical areas, sky-facing radiators can cool below freezing.

If a circular building is aerodynamically smooth, and cooler than the ground, it can be passively cooled by the "dome effect." Many installations have reported that a reflective or light-colored dome induces a local vertical heat-driven vortex that sucks cooler overhead air downward into a dome if the dome is vented properly (a single overhead vent, and peripheral vents). Some people have reported a temperature differential as high as 8 °C (15 °F) between the inside of the dome and the outside. Buckminster Fuller discovered this effect with a simple house design adapted from a grain silo, and adapted his Dymaxion house and geodesic domes to use it.

Refrigerators and air conditioners operating from the waste heat of a diesel engine exhaust, heater flue or solar collector are entering use. These use the same principles as a gas refrigerator. Normally, the heat from a flue powers an "absorptive chiller". The cold water or brine from the chiller is used to cool air or a refrigerated space.

Cogeneration is popular in new commercial buildings. In current cogeneration systems small gas turbines or stirling engines powered from natural gas produce electricity and their exhaust drives an absorptive chiller.

A truck trailer refrigerator operating from the waste heat of a tractor's diesel exhaust was demonstrated by NRG Solutions, Inc. NRG developed a hydronic ammonia gas heat exchanger and vaporizer, the two essential new, not commercially available components of a waste heat driven refrigerator.

A similar scheme (multiphase cooling) can be by a multistage evaporative cooler. The air is passed through a spray of salt solution to dehumidify it, then through a spray of water solution to cool it, then another salt solution to dehumidify it again. The brine has to be regenerated, and that can be done economically with a low-temperature solar still. Multiphase evaporative coolers can lower the air's temperature by 50 °F (28 °C), and still control humidity. If the brine regenerator uses high heat, it also partially sterilises to the air.

If enough electric power is available, cooling can be provided by conventional air conditioning using a heat pump.

=== Food production ===
Food production has often been included in historic autonomous projects to provide security. Skilled, intensive gardening can support an adult from as little as 100 square meters of land per person, possibly requiring the use of organic farming and aeroponics. Some proven intensive, low-effort food-production systems include urban gardening (indoors and outdoors). Indoor cultivation may be set up using hydroponics, while outdoor cultivation may be done using permaculture, forest gardening, no-till farming, and do nothing farming.

Greenhouses are also sometimes included. Sometimes they are also outfitted with irrigation systems or heat sink systems which can respectively irrigate the plants or help to store energy from the sun and redistribute it at night (when the greenhouses starts to cool down).

== See also ==
- Arcology – Type of design principles for human habitats
- Appropriate technology – Concept in the philosophy and politics of technology
- Architectural engineering – Engineering discipline of engineering systems of buildings
- Biosphere – Global sum of all ecosystems on Earth
- Biosphere 2 – Closed ecological research center in Arizona
- BIOS-3 – Closed ecosystem at the Institute of Biophysics in Krasnoyarsk, Russia
- Building – Enclosed structure
- Brenda and Robert Vale – Sustainable housing architects
- Commercial modular construction – Non-residential structures that are mostly built offsite
- Detention basin – Flood control measure
- Earthship – Style of architecture that uses native materials and upcycled materials to build homes
- Ecovillage – Community with the goal of becoming more sustainable
- Environmental engineering – Engineering discipline related to environmental science
- Green building – Environmentally responsible construction principles
- Hydrogen station – Infrastructure for hydrogen transport and distribution
- In-situ resource utilization – Astronautical use of materials harvested in outer space
- Microgeneration (energy) – Small-scale heating and electric power creation
- Passive house – High-performance energy-efficiency building standard
- Quadruple glazing – Type of insulated glazing
- Renewable heat – Application of renewable energy
- Street Farm
- Solar combisystem – Solar collection system which provides heating and cooling
- Vertical farming – Growing crops in stacked layers
- Zero-energy building – Energy efficiency standard for buildings
- Zero heating building – Building without heating demand
