= Ecohouse =

Home built to have low environmental impact

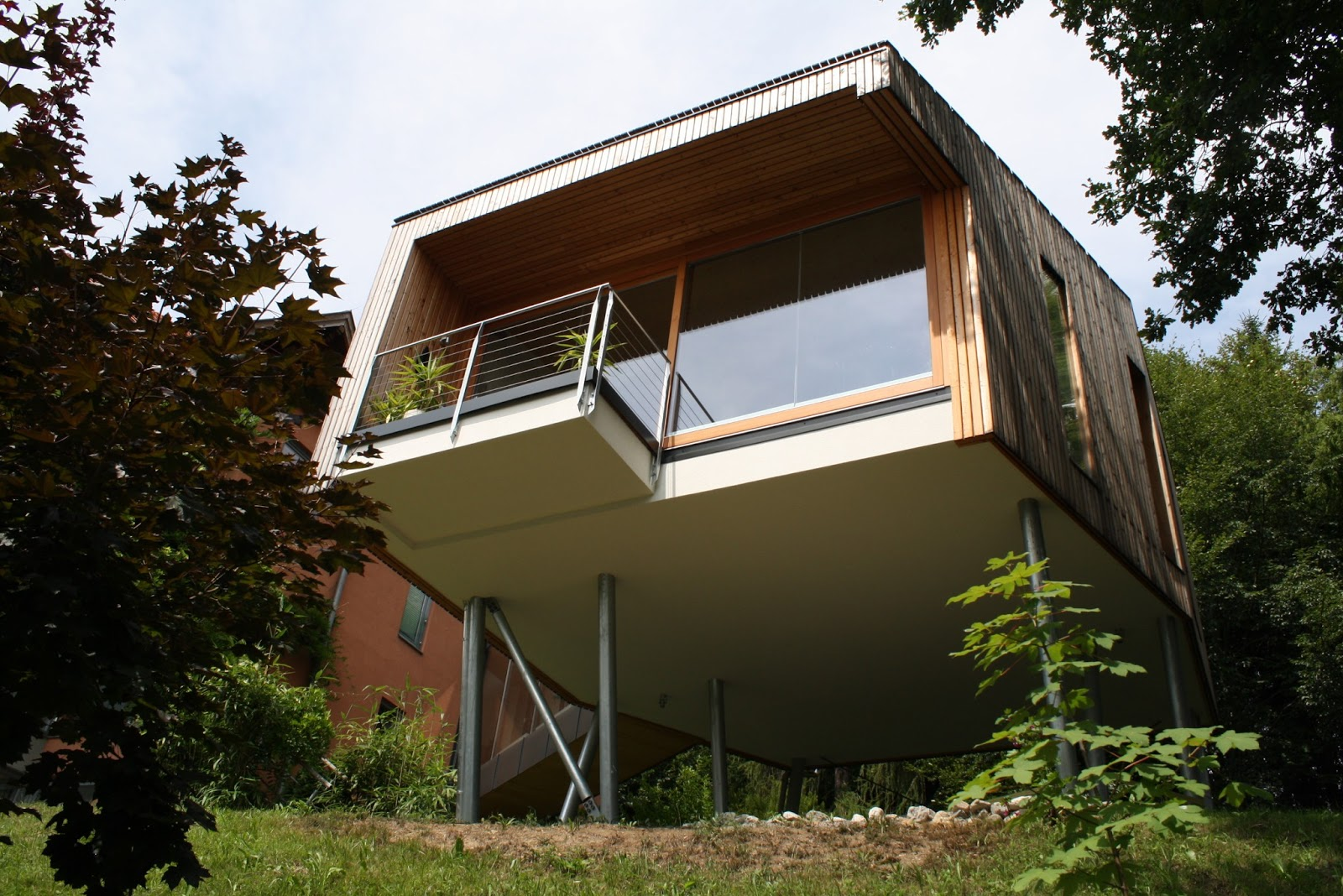
Ecohouse near Faaker See, Austria

An Eco-house (or Eco-home) is an environmentally low-impact home designed and built using materials and technology that reduces its carbon footprint and lowers its energy needs. Eco-homes are measured in multiple ways meeting sustainability needs such as water conservation, reducing wastes through reusing and recycling materials, controlling pollution to limit global warming, energy generation and conservation, and decreasing CO_{2} emissions.

An Eco-house could include some or all of the following:

- Higher than normal levels of thermal insulation
- Better than normal air-tightness
- Good level of daylight
- Passive solar orientation — glazing oriented south for light and heat
- Thermal mass to absorb that solar heat
- Minimum north-facing glazing — to reduce heat loss
- Mechanical ventilation with heat recovery (MVHR) system
- Heating from renewable resources (such as solar, heat pump or biomass)
- Photovoltaic panels, small wind turbine or electricity from a 'green' supplier
- Natural materials — avoidance of PVCu and other plastics
- Rainwater harvesting
- Grey-water collection
- Composting toilet
- Glass that has two or three layers with a vacuum in between to prevent heat loss (double or triple-glazed windows)
- Geothermal heating and growing plants on the roof to regulate temperature, quiet the house, and produce oxygen
- A vegetable patch outside the house for some food

== Building concepts ==
=== Energy loss ===
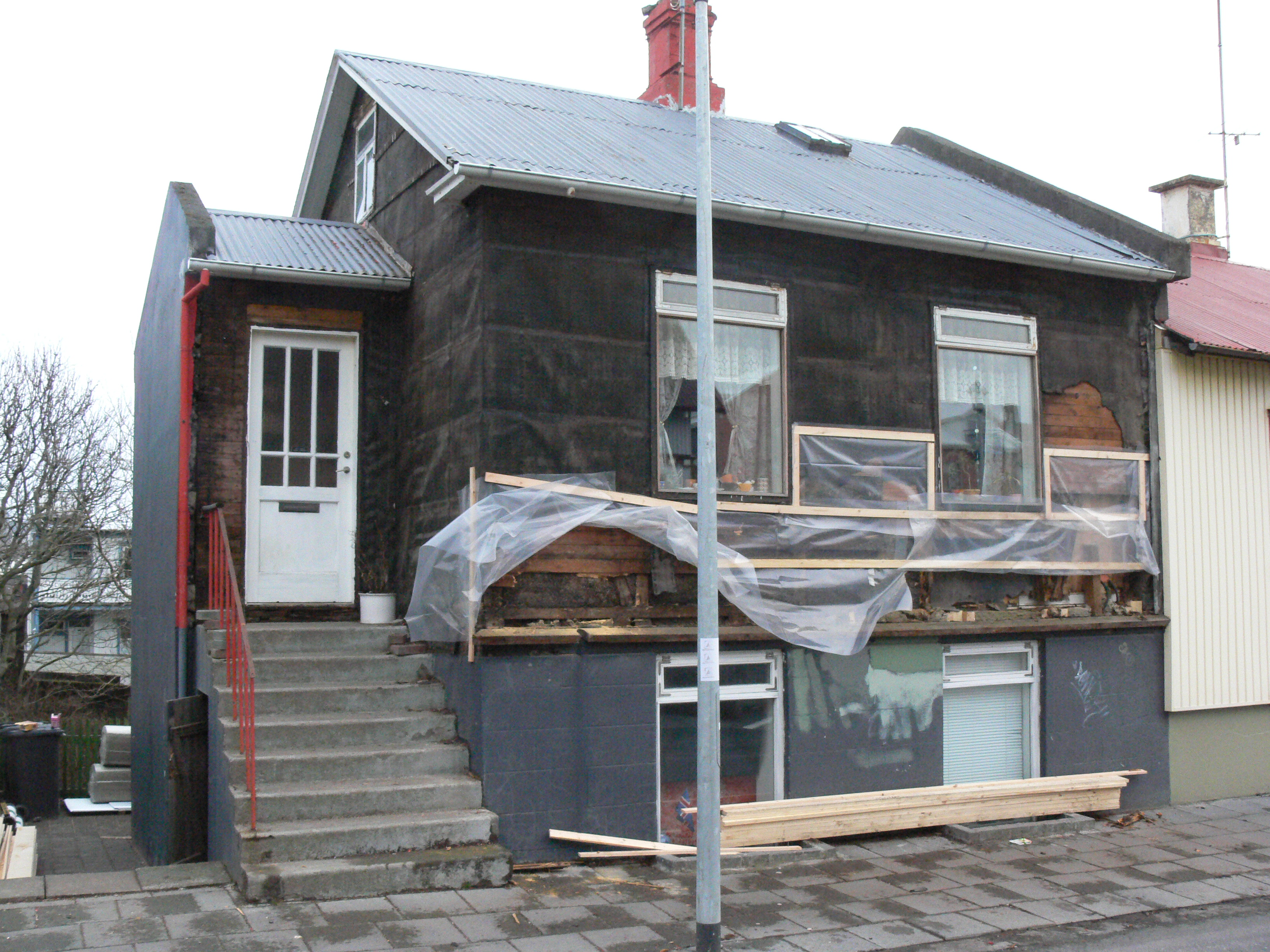
Thermal insulation is the main component of preventing energy loss.

Buildings use up enormous amounts of energy. Home energy as well contributes to global warming. According to The Energy Information Administration, home energy contributes to 21% of all greenhouse gases in the United States alone. In construction as well, 48% of greenhouse gases is emitted. Some calculations make it as much as 70% of all the energy used when all that are well insulated and make the best use of natural light.

=== Insulation ===
Increasing the amount of thermal insulation is the main component of preventing energy loss. According to the EPA Office of Air and Radiation, indoor air is more polluted than outdoor air, and is in the top five human health risks. Such pollution could be caused by toxic chemicals and mold and could lead to asthma induced illnesses. Insulation in Eco-homes include draft exclusion, glazing, wall, roof insulation, and other nontoxic materials. By installing insulation not only are you paying less money for heating bills, but you are also reducing exposure to toxic materials such as the carcinogen formaldehyde found in manufactured wood.

=== Passive solar gain ===
In the northern hemisphere, a south-facing site will be a much better location than a north facing site because of access to sunlight and protection from the cold northerly wind. An eco-house starts life facing the Sun.

Ideally, the site for the house should have a south westerly aspect and be protected from the north and east. It is not always possible to do this but there will usually be an opportunity to take advantage of the passive solar gain by having more glazing on either the front or the back of the building. Planting trees and creating windbreaks on the north and east sides of the site can enhanced the solar gain effect by protecting the house from the cold north easterly winds.

Having faced the house towards the Sun, high performance windows are used to draw in as much light and warmth as possible. Sunlight then floods into the house and any heat generated is retained by a highly insulated building shell, draught proof windows and doors and thermal mass within the building.

=== Active solar gain ===
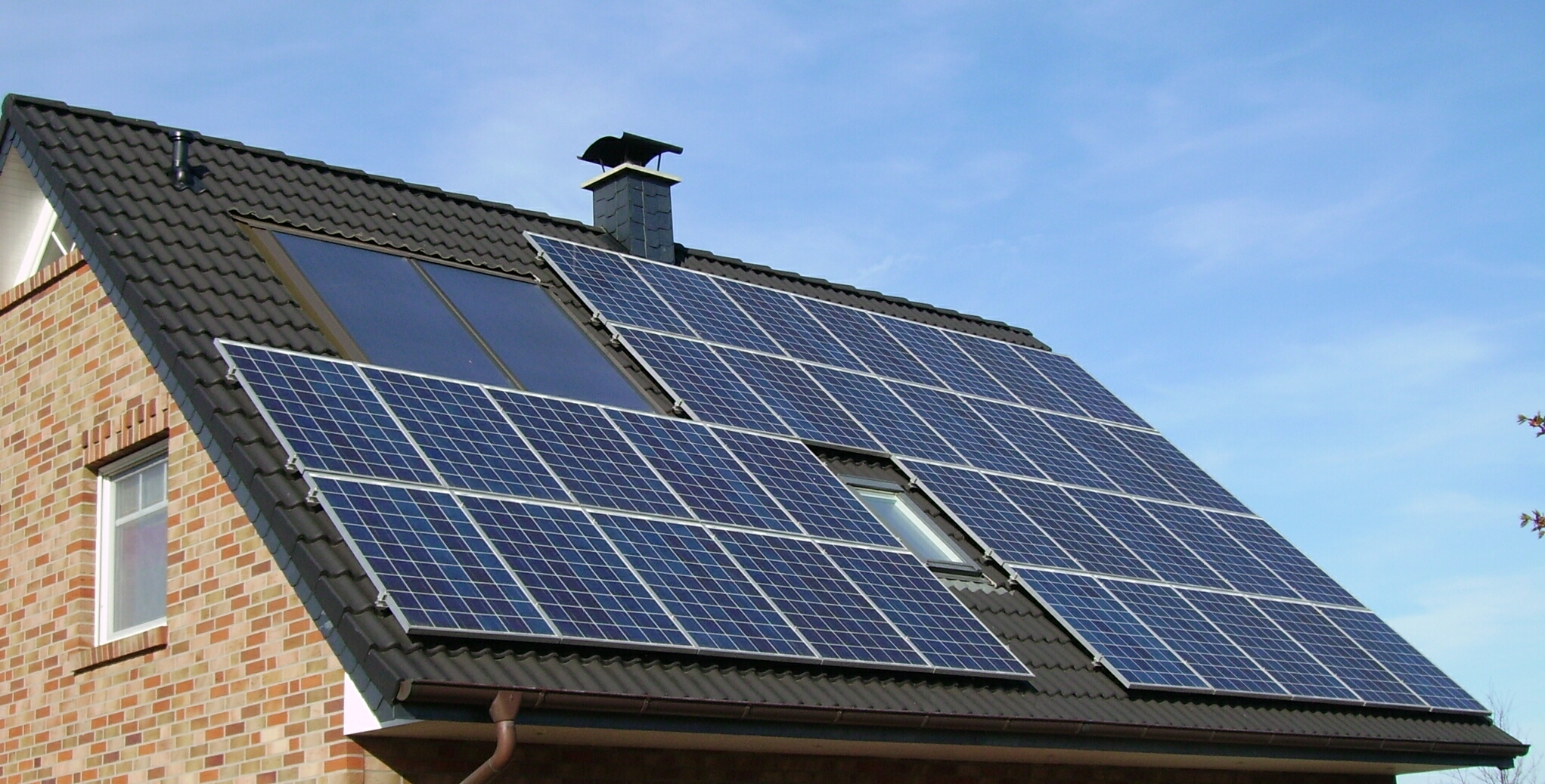
Electricity-generating solar panels on roof

Orientation towards the Sun also means that active solar systems can be fitted, both solar water heating panels and electricity generating solar panels on the roofs, further adding to the free heat and electricity gained from the sun.

=== Living gain ===
Living in the house also generates heat. Active human beings can produce as much heat as a one bar electric fire. Add to this heat from cooking, washing, lights etc. and you can begin to see how an eco-house could get too hot. Conventionally opening the windows reduces heat, but an eco-house design could include heat recovery ventilation systems.

=== Heat recovery ventilation ===
These systems extract the warm, moist air from bathrooms and kitchens and take the heat out of the stale, damp air before venting it outside. The heat recovery system transfers this collected heat to fresh air coming into the building and distributes it to the bedrooms and living rooms, which creates fresh air at room temperature. An added benefit is that filters can be fitted on the air intake to provide a barrier to pollen or other irritants.

=== Living heat loss ===
With the passive and active solar gains, insulation, draft proofed building shell and heat recovery system, eco-houses could be zero heat; that is, in theory, one should not need to keep pumping heat into them from a central heating system. In practice, heat loss inevitably occurs as the inhabitants open the home's doors and windows for various reasons. An eco-house can incorporate design to have heating systems that can react quickly and efficiently to any changes in room temperature as well as providing a heat boost to the water temperature down-stream of the solar panels.

=== Sustainable materials ===
One of the wider issues of energy efficiency is the embodied energy within the construction materials. (Embodied energy is the energy taken up with producing and transporting the materials used).

==== Timber ====
Wood is a primary building material for eco-housing. This is because trees grow using energy from the Sun, do not pollute, produce oxygen, absorb CO_{2}, provide a wildlife habitat, can be replanted, can be sourced locally, and the timber can be put to some other use after a building is demolished.

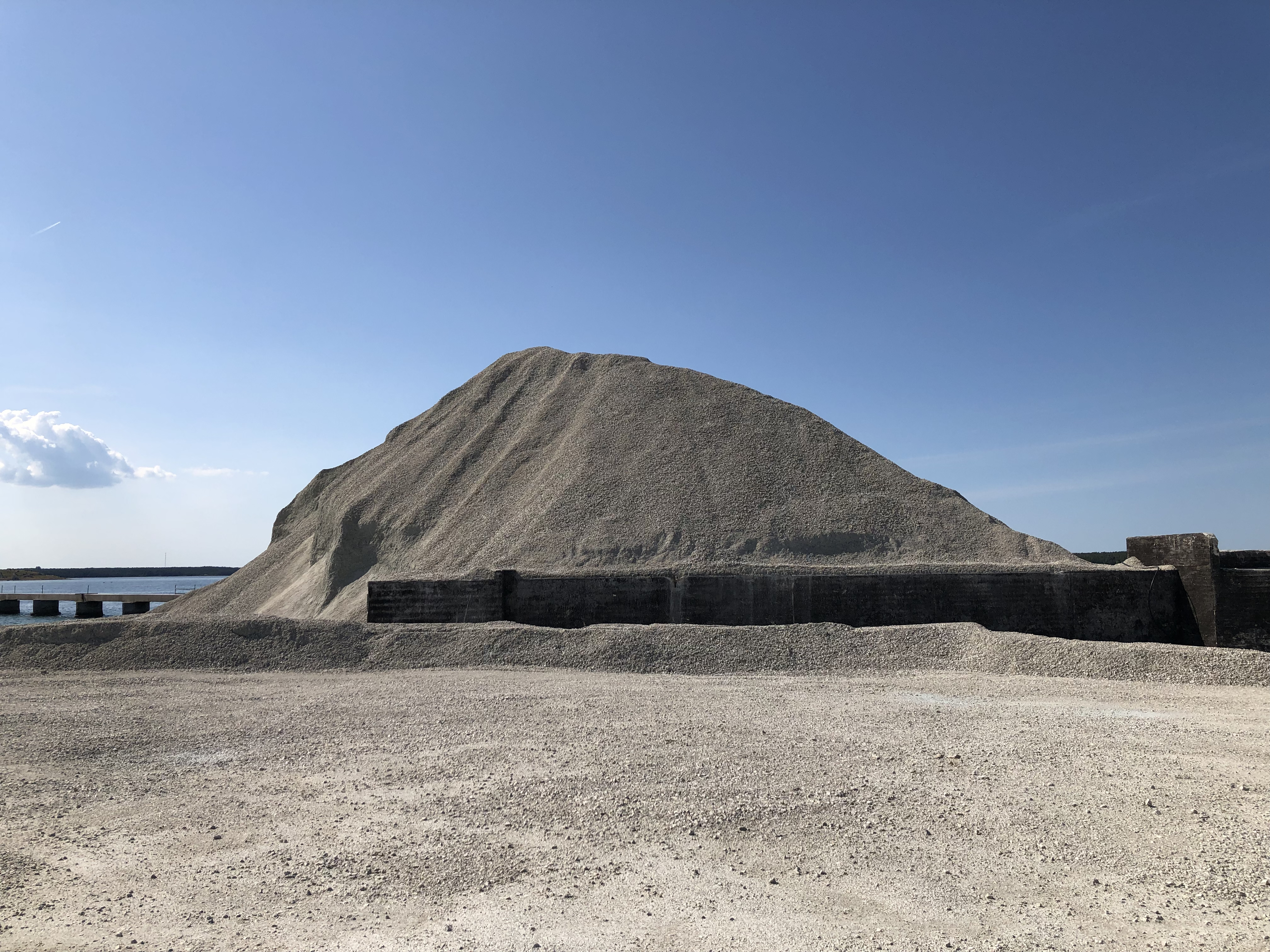
Lime is a sustainable material for energy efficiency.

==== Lime ====
Cement is a commonly used building material and there are places where it is more practical to be used. However, one alternative to cement is lime. Lime has been used as a building material for thousands of years and although energy and CO_{2} are used in its production it gently returns to limestone in time, taking in CO_{2} in the process.

==== Reclaimed materials ====
There is also the use of reclaimed materials, particularly bricks, slates and roof tiles, to make use of the embodied energy within these materials. This can also help new buildings to blend in with their surroundings.

=== Health ===
Other benefits of an Eco-house, aside from having minimal heating costs, are a healthy living environment. The heat recovery system can eliminate dampness and hazardous mold growth. The air intake filters prevent dust coming in with the incoming fresh air and the internal vacuum cleaner system extracts dust from the house and vents it (via the dust collection bag and filter) to the outside; thus no microscopic particles of dust remain in the house.

Load bearing internal walls are minimised to allow rearrangements of the interior spaces, and the build technology is such that local trades can carry out alterations and easy maintenance.

For the health of the householder, and the planet, an Eco-house should be built with materials that are free, wherever possible, from toxins or harmful products of the petro-chemical industry.

The better indoor environmental quality of Eco-houses has also improved health and satisfaction among occupants by reducing exposure to pollutants, allergens, and other contaminants. According to Dr. Joseph Allen and his research at Harvard T.H. Chan School of Public Health, this leads to inhabitants of Eco-houses suffering less from sick building syndrome while maintaining positive mental and physical stability.

=== Costs ===
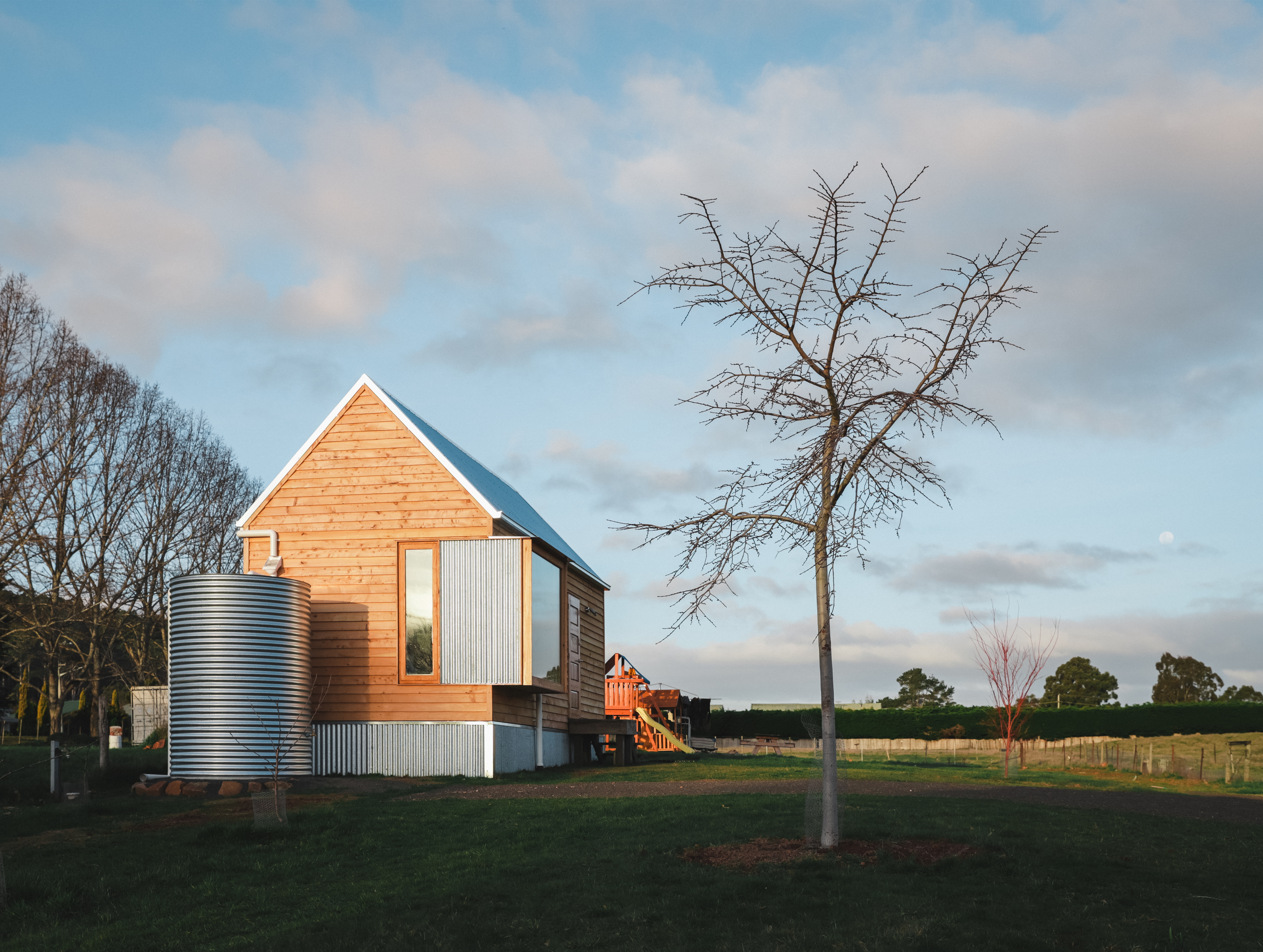
An example of affordable eco-house (Australia)

Generally, Eco-houses are labelled as costly and expensive for the average citizen to afford. Perceptions of costs are one of the main issues for many builders and owners. This perception is induced by media coverage of Eco-houses built according to the standards of above-average-income homeowners. According to the 2006 McGraw-Hill Construction Residential Green Building SmartMarket Report, around two-thirds of Eco-house buyers had an annual income of over $50,000. This above average income and the freedom to mix their own interior design, furniture, and materials for their Eco-houses attributes to the addition of more expensive features. This does not mean there are no affordable Eco-houses on the market: the Ecohome Network successfully built Canada's first LEED Platinum V4 home, the Edelweiss House, in the harsh climate of Quebec for around the same cost as a code-built home. Canada Green Building Council President Thomas Mueller called Ecohome's Edelweiss House "a phenomenal achievement".

Builders of Eco-houses are also taking initiatives to reduce the costs associated with general homes. The main factors contributing to cost for any house includes land, planning, infrastructure, professional fees, accreditation, compliance fees, labour, materials, market, and occupation. With this being said, initiatives being done to reduce house costs for Eco-houses are directed towards materials and the market. In decreasing material costs, Eco-house builders use reclaimed materials. Eco-house builders can also gain community land trust for ownership of land. For example, in Colorado, US, Eco-builders were able to eliminate costs by building on cheap land in an absent location while using reclaimed materials. With building in a remote location, the Colorado Eco-builders eliminated land costs.

== See also ==
- Green home
- Biophilic design
- Green building
- Energy-plus-house
- Low-energy house
- First EcoHouse
