= Microponics =

Symbiotic agricultural practice

Microponics, in agricultural practice, is a symbiotic integration of fish, plants, and micro-livestock within a semi-controlled environment, designed to enhance soil fertility and crop productivity. Coined by Gary Donaldson, an Australian urban farmer, in 2008, the term was used to describe his innovative concept of integrated backyard food production. While "microponics" had been previously used to refer to an obscure grafting method in hydroponics, Donaldson's application of the term was derived from the amalgamation of micro-livestock (micro-farming) and the cultivation of fish and plants, a practice commonly known as aquaponics.

== History ==
The origins of microponics can be traced back to the integrated aquaculture experiments conducted by the New Alchemy Institute during the late 1960s and early 1970s. The New Alchemists developed innovative food production models that revolved around the integration of various elements, including fish, plants, ducks, rabbits, and other organisms, all housed within their solar and wind-powered Cape Cod Ark bio-shelter.

The concept of integrated aquaculture, which involves converting the by-products (waste) of one species into the feedstock (food, fertilizer, etc.) for another species, deeply resonated with Gary Donaldson when he was introduced to it in the mid-1970s. His vision was to create a backyard food production system that empowered ordinary households to cultivate their own fresh and clean food using modest skills and appropriate technology. Recognizing that water was a fundamental necessity for all plant and animal species, Donaldson believed that aquaculture should play a central role in any integrated backyard food production system.

While inspired by the idea of integration from the New Alchemists, Donaldson faced a challenge regarding scale. The Cape Cod Ark, which measured just under 30 meters in length and 6 meters in height, proved to be too large for an average backyard setting.

Furthermore, in the 1970s, the translation of the New Alchemists' work into an Australian context was hindered by the lack of information about the culture of Australian fish species. However, in the following two decades, aquaculture in Australia matured, and local researchers identified several suitable freshwater aquaculture species. By 2007, Gary Donaldson became confident that limited quantities of Australian freshwater fish could be successfully grown in as little as 600 liters of water in a backyard environment.

The concept of integrated aquaculture served as a precursor to aquaponics, which gained international momentum by the mid-2000s. While aquaponics is typically defined as the combination of recirculating aquaculture and hydroponics to produce fish and plants, Donaldson found this concept to be limiting. He continued to advocate for a more holistic approach to small-scale food production, incorporating the integration of micro-livestock. Microponics, as a concept, suggests that recirculating aquaculture can be advantageously combined with almost any plant growing system. One of the key issues with aquaponics, similar to many aquaculture practices, is its reliance on fishmeal and oil derived from wild catch marine species. The inherent greater bio-diversity in microponics offers the potential to reduce or even eliminate this dependency.

=== Integrations within microponics ===
The integrations embodied within microponics include:

- Fish and crustaceans
- Vegetables, herbs, and fruit
- Chickens for meat and eggs
- Japanese quail
- Rabbits and other micro-livestock
- Muscovies
- Geese and other waterfowl
- Live animal protein - worms, black soldier fly larvae, mealworms
- Fodder plants - including duckweed
- Snails

Given its emphasis on backyard food production, microponics tends to focus on smaller micro-livestock species but, where space and local planning laws permit, the concept can be expanded to include traditional species such as pigs, goats, sheep, and even micro-cattle breeds like the Dexter.

== Advantages ==
The advantages of microponics food production systems include:

- Empowerment of families to produce their own clean, fresh food.
- Conservation through water reuse and recycling.
- Organic fertilization of plants with natural fish emulsion.
- Efficient use of space through Its small footprint.
- Reduced reliance on purchased livestock rations.
- Educational value as a learning resource for students of all ages.

== Disadvantages ==
Some disadvantages of microponics are:

- Initial expense for housing, tank, plumbing, pumps, and grow beds.
- The infinite number of ways in which a system can be configured lends itself to varying results, conflicting research, and successes or failures.
- Limitations in heavily urbanized environments, where a lack of space or local regulations may restrict certain integrations within the microponics system.

== See also ==
- Horticulture
- Permaculture
