= Christie Walk =

Cohousing development in Adelaide, Australia

Coordinates: 34.933221°S 138.596475°E

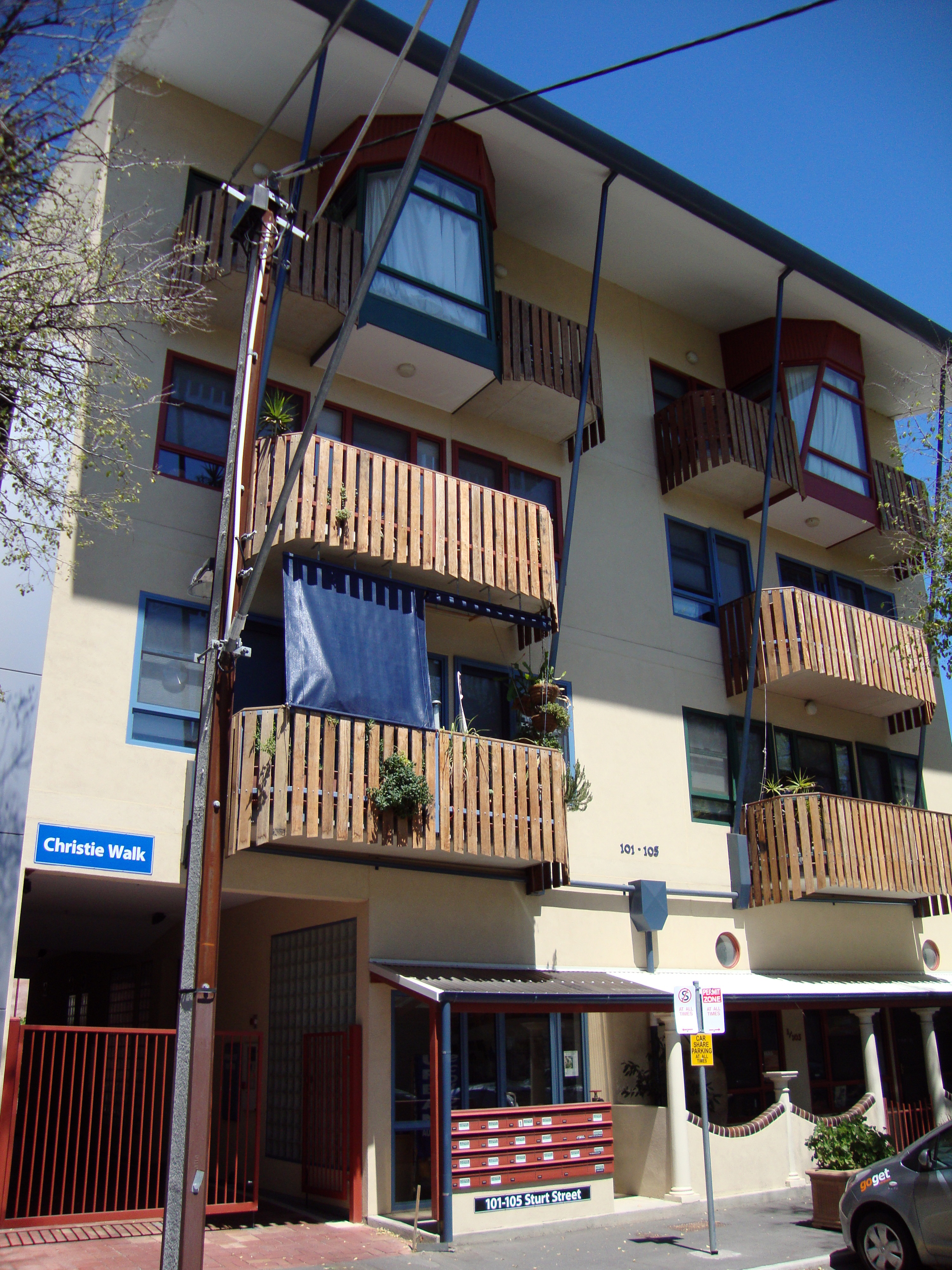
Christie Walk, Sturt Street facade

Christie Walk is a model ecological cohousing development in central Adelaide, Australia. It consists of 27 dwellings on a 2,000 square metres site. It was designed by local architect Paul Downton and completed in 2006. Its innovative aspects include energy- and water-saving measures, use of ethical finance and use of recycled non-toxic materials.

== Influences ==
Christie Walk was founded by Urban Ecology Australia Inc as a living example of the 10 Ecopolis Development Principles, which were established by Paul Downton, Cherie Hoyle and Emilis Prelgauskas.

The development has been included as a case study in the Australian Government's guide to environmentally sustainable homes and inspired similar projects such as Aldinga EcoVillage and a cohousing development in Canberra.

At the 2021 biennial Carbon Neutral Adelaide Awards event, Christie Walk was made a Carbon Neutral Adelaide Ambassador, an honour given so far to only 3 others of the 200 Carbon Neutral Adelaide Partners. Urban Ecology Australia also won the award for Community Leadership in recognition of three decades of campaigning, researching and educating on the transformation of conventional cities into Ecological Cities.

== Ongoing upgrades ==
Construction of Christie Walk was completed in 2006, when the final building - Sturt Apartments - added 13 households, bringing the total to 27. But efforts to reduce emissions are ongoing through a program of technology upgrades. The Christie Walk community ensures that lessons learned along the way are shared widely through on-site tours, virtual tours and documentation of the upgrades. The documentation is especially relevant to strata groups where upgrades and emissions reduction projects are more complicated than for stand-alone home owners.
