= Green home =

Type of house designed to be environmentally sustainable

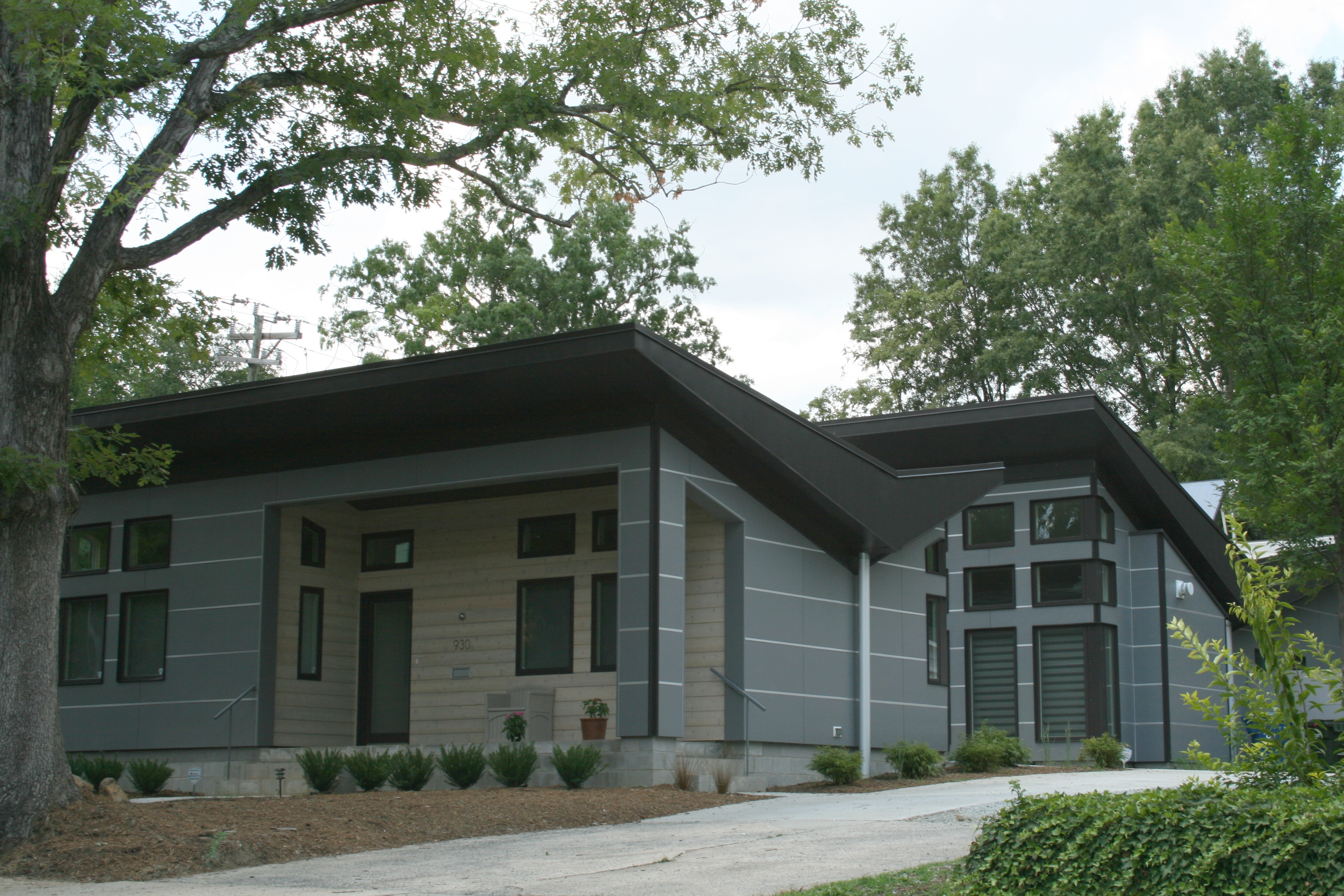
An example of a green home design that is energy-efficient and has a sloped roof to divert rainwater for collection

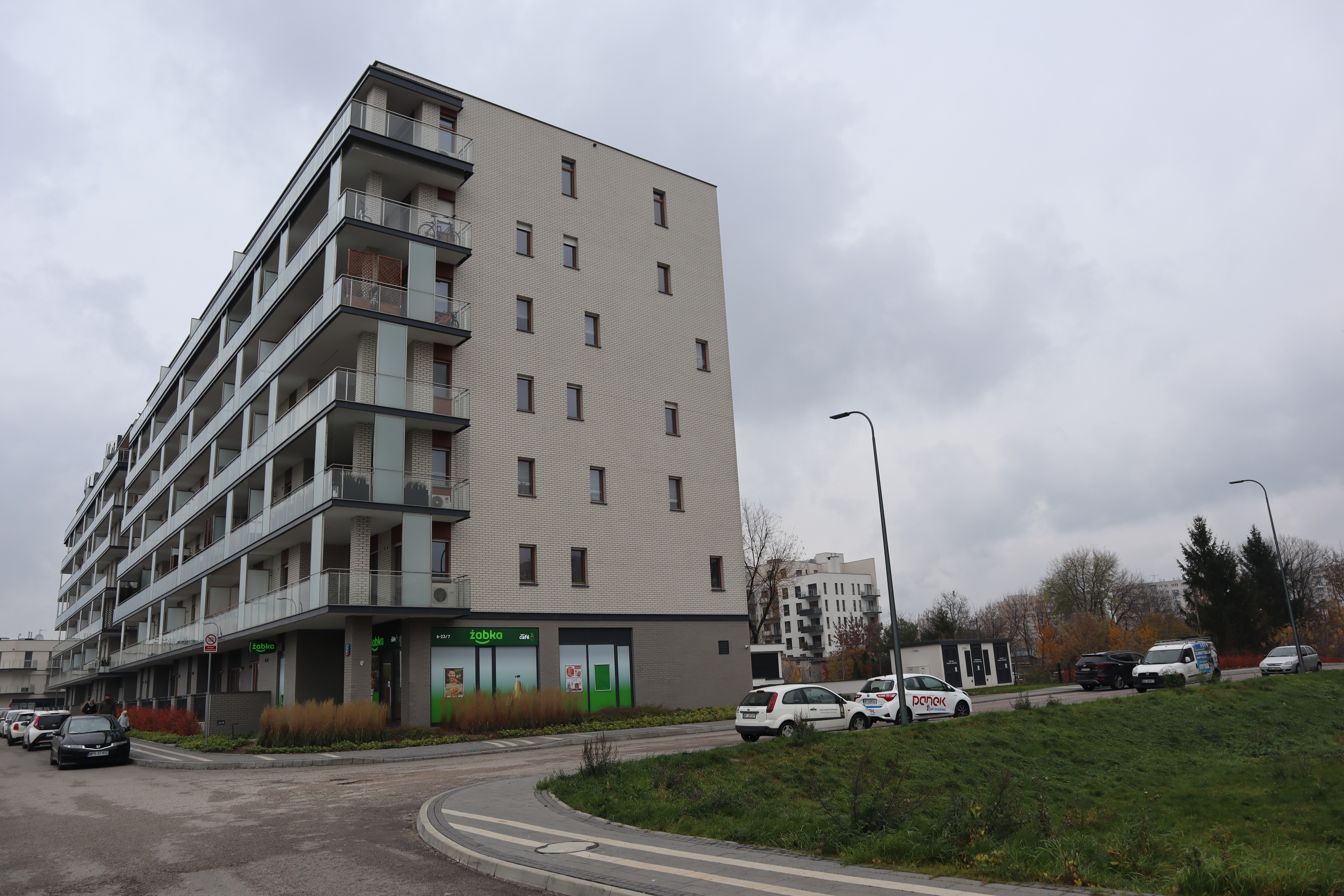
Green housing located in Warsaw, Poland.

A green home is a type of house designed to be environmentally sustainable. Green homes focus on the efficient use of "energy, water, and building materials". A green home may use sustainably sourced, environmentally friendly, and/or recycled building materials. This includes materials like reclaimed wood, recycled metal, and low VOC (volatile organic compound) paints. Additionally, green homes often prioritize energy efficiency by incorporating features, such as high-performance insulation, energy-efficient appliances, and smart home technologies that monitor and optimize energy usage. Water conservation is another important aspect, with green homes often featuring water-saving fixtures, rainwater harvesting systems, and grey water recycling systems to reduce water waste. It may include sustainable energy sources such as solar or geothermal, and be sited to take maximum advantage of natural features such as sunlight and tree cover to improve energy efficiency.

== Elements ==
No government standards define what constitutes a green remodel, beyond non-profit certification. In general, a green home is a house that is built or remodeled in order to conserve "energy or water; improve indoor air quality; use sustainable, recycled or used materials; and produce less waste in the process." This may include buying more energy-efficient appliances or employing building materials that are more efficient in managing temperature.

A green home often incorporates design elements that maximize natural lighting and ventilation, reducing the need for artificial lighting and HVAC systems. Additionally, sustainable landscaping practices, such as native plantings and rainwater harvesting systems, can further enhance the eco-friendliness of the property. Integration of renewable energy sources like solar panels can also contribute to the overall sustainability of the home, reducing reliance on non-renewable energy sources and decreasing greenhouse gas emissions. In essence, a green home strives to minimize its environmental impact throughout its lifecycle, from construction to daily operation and eventual disposal or repurposing of materials.

== History ==
=== United States ===
In the United States, the green building movement began in the 1970s, after the price of oil began to increase sharply. In response, researchers began to look into more energy efficient systems. Nevertheless, individuals required persistence to navigate the bewildering array of incomplete and imperfect information that was the wilderness frontier of what is now known as green building. In 1999, Richard and Katherine Homan began building Dallas, Texas' first comprehensive green home. It took until 2012 for the city to issue a proclamation for having the city's first comprehensive green home.

Many organizations were founded in the 1990s to promote green buildings. Some organizations worked to improve consumer knowledge so that they could have more green homes. The International Code Council and the National Association of Home Builders began working in 2006 to create a "voluntary green home building standard".

The Energy Policy Act was enacted in 2005, which allowed tax reductions for homeowners who could show the use of energy efficient changes to their homes, such as solar panels and other solar-powered devices.

== Certifications ==
Various types of certifications certify a home as a green home.

=== United States ===
LEED: The U.S. Green Building Council has a green certification titled Leadership in Energy and Environmental Design. The factors that it considers include "the site location, use of energy and water, incorporation of healthier building and insulation materials, recycling, use of renewable energy, and protection of natural resources". LEED offers a specific certification track for residential buildings, known as LEED for Homes. This program assesses the environmental performance of single-family homes, multifamily buildings, and mixed-use developments, considering factors such as location, water efficiency, materials selection, and indoor air quality.

Model Green Home Building Guidelines: The US National Association of Home Builders independently created its Model Green Home Building Guidelines as a type of certification, along with programs for utilities.

ENERGY STAR: In the United States, the ENERGY STAR program, administered by the Environmental Protection Agency (EPA), certifies homes that meet stringent energy efficiency standards. ENERGY STAR-certified homes are designed to use less energy for heating, cooling, and water heating, resulting in lower utility bills and reduced greenhouse gas emissions.

Passive House: The Passive House Institute and Passive House Institute US (PHIUS+) standards focus on designing and constructing ultra-low energy buildings that require very little energy for heating or cooling. Passive House certification requires rigorous adherence to specific energy performance criteria, including airtightness, high-quality insulation, and mechanical ventilation with heat recovery.

=== International ===
Living Building Challenge: This certification program, administered by the International Living Future Institute, goes beyond traditional green building standards by emphasizing regenerative design principles. Buildings certified under the Living Building Challenge must meet strict criteria related to energy, water, materials, equity, and beauty, and must demonstrate net-positive impacts on the environment and community.

BREEAM (Building Research Establishment Environmental Assessment Method): Originating in the United Kingdom, BREEAM is a widely recognized green building certification system used internationally. It assesses the environmental performance of buildings based on criteria such as energy and water use, materials selection, waste management, and ecological impact.

=== Australia ===
Green Star: Green Star is an Australian sustainability rating system for buildings and communities, developed by the Green Building Council of Australia. It evaluates the environmental attributes of buildings across categories such as energy efficiency, indoor environmental quality, transport, and innovation.

=== India ===
IGBC-Certified Green Home The Indian Green Building Council (IGBC), part of the Confederation of Indian Industry was formed in the year 2001. The council offers a wide array of services that include developing new green building rating programmes, certification services and green building training programs.

Climate Smart Homes

Climate Smart Homes is Housing initiative developed by B.H.R.T. Infra Private Limited These homes are designed for sustainable living, countering the challenges posed by climate change on housing and residents, such as heatwaves and cold waves, while promoting energy efficiency and environmental sustainability. India's first Climate Smart Home is located in Ludhiana, Punjab on a 20-by-50-foot east-facing plot, with a total built-up area of 2,500 square feet. The design incorporates Vastu Shastra principles and is specifically tailored to India's Composite Climatic Zone, utilizing government data on weather patterns and temperature trends.

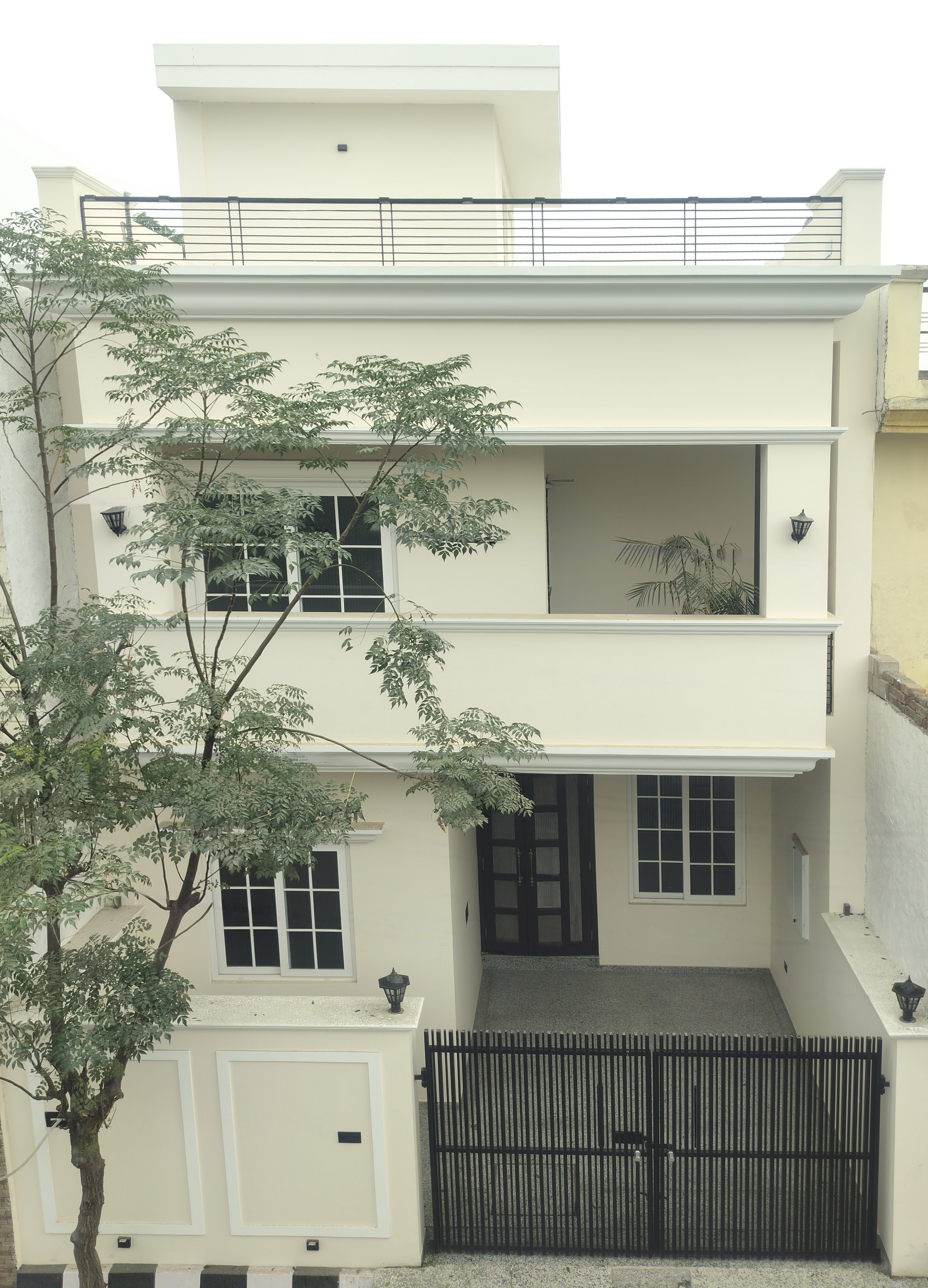
Climate smart home built by B.H.R.T. Infra

Features

Climate Smart Homes incorporate various design features intended to adapt to India's diverse climate zones and mitigate the impacts of extreme weather. Key characteristics include:

1. Climatic Zone Adaptation: Tailored to India's geographical and climatic diversity, these homes factor in site-specific conditions and anticipated climatic changes.
2. Thermal Protection: The homes utilize construction materials with low thermal conductivity, featuring walls and roofs with U-values of 0.175 W/m^{2}K and 0.235 W/m^{2}K, respectively, to reduce energy consumption and thermal stress.
3. UV Ray Mitigation: Orientation-specific designs are used to block ultraviolet rays, contributing to healthier indoor environments.
4. Natural Ventilation and Daylight: Techniques such as cross ventilation, stack ventilation, and strategic window placement enhance airflow and natural lighting, reducing dependence on mechanical systems.

Health and Environmental Benefits

The initiative aims to address both human health and environmental sustainability. Key benefits include:

- Improved indoor comfort during extreme temperatures through thermally efficient roofs and walls.
- Enhanced natural lighting to support Vitamin D synthesis and reduce reliance on artificial lighting.
- Water-efficient systems that conserve resources while promoting sustainability.

Impacts on Health

Climate Smart Homes are designed to mitigate health risks associated with extreme weather. These include:

- Reducing heat-related conditions such as dehydration and heatstroke.
- Minimizing cardiovascular and respiratory stress during extreme weather.
- Alleviating mental health challenges associated with climatic stress through improved living conditions.

Broader Context

The Climate Smart Homes initiative aligns with national programs such as Make in India and Atmanirbhar Bharat, and contributes to India's Vision 2047 and global climate goals. The project is led by Taniksh Gaur Verma, who has certifications in climate change from the United Nations. The initiative seeks to promote sustainable and resilient housing for all sectors of society.

== Global examples ==
Earthship Biotecture (Taos, New Mexico, USA): Earthships are a unique type of sustainable home pioneered by architect Michael Reynolds. These homes are built using recycled materials such as tires, bottles, and cans, and they utilize passive solar heating, natural ventilation, and rainwater harvesting systems to achieve off-grid living. The thick walls made of rammed earth or tires provide excellent thermal mass, helping to regulate indoor temperatures year-round. Earthships often incorporate greenhouse spaces for food production, further enhancing their self-sufficiency and sustainability.

The Zero Carbon House (Birmingham, UK): The Zero Carbon House, also known as the 'Balsall Heath House,' is an innovative example of sustainable retrofitting. Originally a Victorian terraced house, with double-wythe solid-brick walls (i.e. no cavity walls), it was transformed into a zero-carbon dwelling through extensive renovation and the integration of energy-efficient technologies. The house features high levels of insulation, triple-glazed windows, airtight construction with mechanical ventilation heat recovery, and rooftop solar panels for renewable energy generation. It also incorporates passive design principles to minimize energy demand while maximizing comfort for occupants — achieving a fifth of the heat demand of 3 kWh/m^{2}.year against a Passivhaus standard of 15 kWh/m^{2}.year. The Zero Carbon House serves as a model for reducing carbon emissions in existing urban housing stock.

The Bosco Verticale (Vertical Forest) (Milan, Italy): The Bosco Verticale is a pair of residential towers designed by Stefano Boeri Architects. What makes these buildings unique is their extensive greenery, with thousands of trees and shrubs planted on balconies at every level. The vegetation helps to absorb carbon dioxide, produce oxygen, filter pollutants, and regulate indoor temperatures, reducing the buildings' environmental impact and enhancing urban biodiversity. The Bosco Verticale demonstrates how high-density urban living can be combined with nature to create sustainable and aesthetically pleasing living spaces.

== See also ==
- Biophilic design
- Blue roof
- Building-integrated photovoltaics
- Direct current buildings
- Ecohouse
- Ecological design
- Ecovillage
- Energy-plus building
- Green roof
- Natural building
- Passive solar building design
- Rainwater harvesting
- Rainwater tank
- Sustainable architecture
- Sustainable city
- Sustainable design
- Zero-energy building
