= Paul F. Downton =

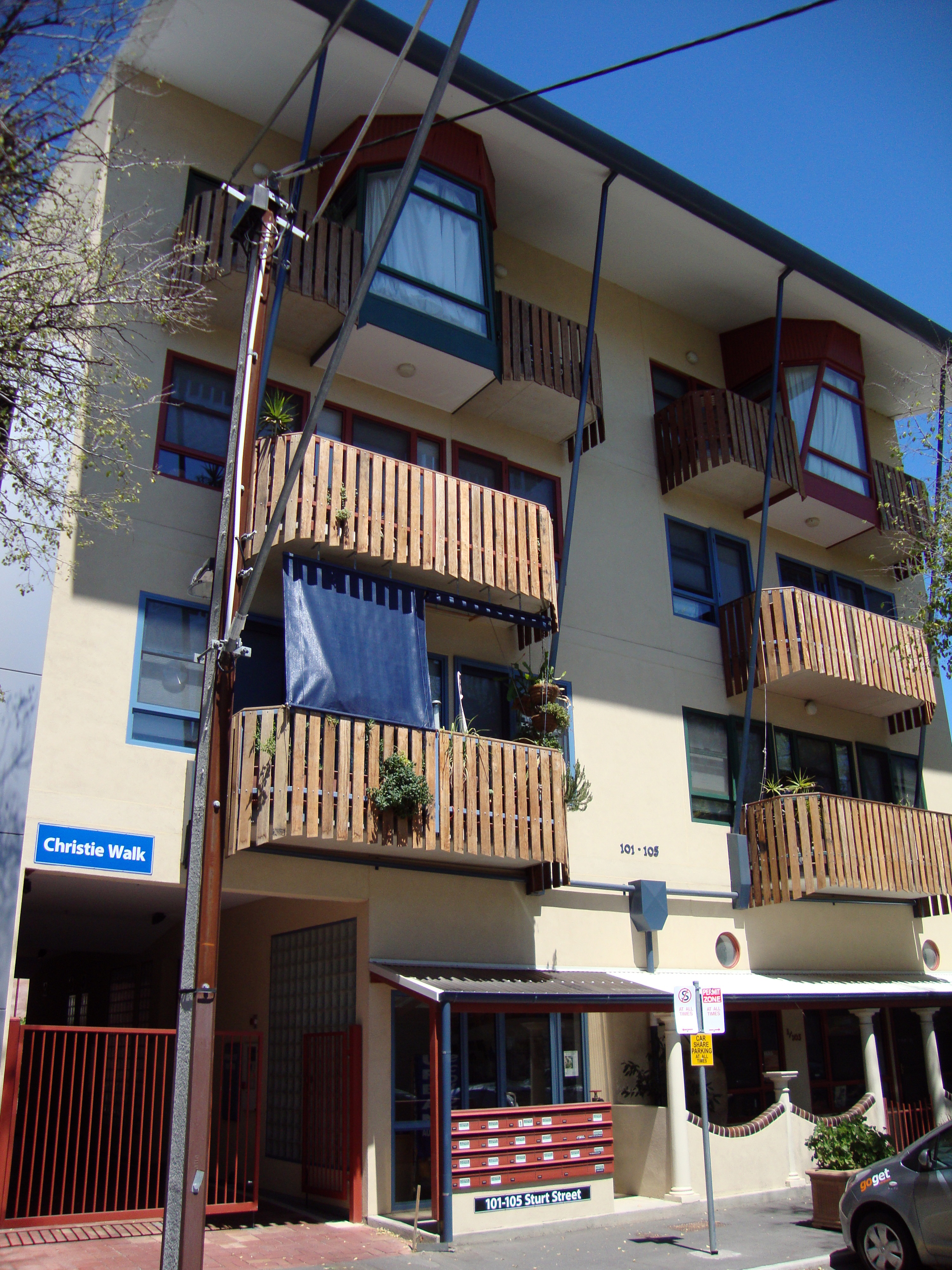
Christie Walk, Sturt Street facade

Paul F Downton is a sustainable city theorist and activist, ecological architect, urbanist and professional writer on architecture, ecocities, environment and the arts. He designed the Christie Walk development in Adelaide, Australia.

== Academic and professional background ==
Downton is a graduate from the University of Wales and his doctorate is in environmental studies from the University of Adelaide. His academic background includes over 25 years teaching architecture in the UK, US, Jordan and Australia.

He has been Principal Architect and Director of Ecopolis Architects in Adelaide since 1990, specialising exclusively in ecological architecture and bio-urban design.

== Community and NGO work ==
Paul was inspired by the ideas of Street Farm and Paolo Soleri.

Downton was the founder of an Australian community organisation focussed on climate change in 1989, the now-defunct Greenhouse Association of SA.

In 1991, he became the founding convener of Urban Ecology Australia, a not-for-profit group advocating the rapid development of ecological cities as an essential part of fighting accelerated climate change and ecological collapse.

He is on the Board of Advisors of Ecocity Builders, an NGO founded by Richard Register based in Berkeley.

In 2008, Dr Downton was a South Australian finalist for Australian of the Year for his years of commitment to the advocacy of sustainable urban ecological development in the non-profit sector.

== Publications ==
Dr Downton is author of Ecopolis: Architecture and Cities for a Changing Climate, the flagship publication in Springer Press’ Future City series, simultaneously published in Australia by the CSIRO.

== Awards ==
- National Winner, Christie Walk Ecocity Project – Inner-city sustainable housing development, ENERGY GLOBE Award 2008, ENERGY GLOBE Award.
- Silver Prize, Christie Walk EcoCity Project, Ryutaro Hashimoto APFED Awards for promotion and practical demonstration of socially-equitable and sustainable city living. Asia Pacific Forum for Environment and Development, Japan.
- Finalist, Christie Walk EcoCity Project, World Habitat Award 2005, Building & Social Housing Foundation/UN-HABITAT, UK.
