= Min Hall =

New Zealand architect

- Born: New Zealand
- Education: Victoria University of Wellington
- Occupations: Architect, University lecturer
- Awards: Fellow of the New Zealand Institute of Architects
- Practice: Min Hall Architects; Arthouse Architects

Min Hall is a New Zealand architect and academic. She was the first female graduate in architecture at Victoria University of Wellington, in 1979. After practising in Nelson, she moved to lecturing at Unitec Institute of Technology in Auckland. She specialises in sustainable building materials such as earth and straw bales, and environmental issues in architecture. Hall is a Fellow of the New Zealand Institute of Architects.

== Biography ==
Hall was Victoria University of Wellington's first female architecture graduate, completing her Bachelor of Architecture in 1979. There had been three women in the first intake at the school, in 1975, but Hall was the only one to complete the course. Afterwards she still felt underprepared and spent time working directly on an old house of her own, worked for a Blenheim architect, and designed some shelters for the Department of Conservation. After registering as an architect in 1986, Hall then worked for Peter Beaven in Christchurch, before opening her own practice Min Hall Architects in Motueka. She was later a founding director of Arthouse Architects.

Hall's 2010 House for Tree Lovers in Golden Bay featured in the book Snapshot 500 and in Home magazine. It was awarded the Nelson Marlborough 2012 New Zealand Architecture Award and the 2012 NZIA People's Choice Award.

She completed a Master of Architecture at Victoria University of Wellington in 2012. Her thesis, supervised by Brenda Vale, was on earth and straw bales as building materials. Hall transitioned from practice to lecturing at Unitec Institute of Technology. She was the lead researcher on a project to develop a prefab building product using straw.

Hall was elected as a Fellow of the New Zealand Institute of Architects.
