= Brenda and Robert Vale =

Sustainable housing architects

Dr Brenda Vale
- Spouse: Robert Vale

Academic background
- Education: University of Cambridge

Academic work
- Discipline: Architecture
- Sub-discipline: ecological footprinting, sustainable building design, zero energy housing design, history of prefabrication
- Institutions: Victoria University of Wellington
- Notable students: Min Hall

Dr Robert Vale
- Spouse: Brenda Vale

Academic background
- Education: University of Cambridge

Academic work
- Discipline: Architecture
- Sub-discipline: ecological foot-printing, sustainable building design, zero energy housing, sustainable transport
- Institutions: Victoria University of Wellington

Professor Brenda Vale and Doctor Robert Vale are architects, writers, researchers, and experts in the field of sustainable housing.

== Background ==
After studying architecture together at the University of Cambridge, in 1975 the Vales published "The Autonomous House", a technical guide for developing housing solutions that are energy-self-sufficient, environmentally friendly, relatively easy to maintain, and have a traditional appearance. The book has been translated into five languages and is widely recognised as a basic text in the field of green building.

Through the 1980s the Vales designed a number of commercial buildings in England, notably the thick-walled, super-insulated Woodhouse Medical Centre in Sheffield.

In the 1990s the Vales completed two important green building projects in Nottinghamshire: the first in 1993, the first autonomous building in the United Kingdom, a four-bedroom house for themselves in the historic town of Southwell. Their book "The New Autonomous House" documents the design and construction of this house, which is warmed and powered by the sun, produces its drinking water from rain, composts its effluent, and is consistent with its historic context. The house is completely off-grid except for the telephone line and a connection to the electrical supply. The latter supplies power from the grid when the occupants are using more electricity than is being produced by the solar panels mounted behind the house, and exports at times of surplus generation.

The other is the Hockerton Housing Project, five one-story residential units using the same design tactic of thick walls, thermal mass, and superinsulation.

In 1996, the Vales emigrated to New Zealand, where they held professorships at the School of Architecture, Victoria University of Wellington. In previous years both worked at The University of Auckland, mainly as Doctoral research projects supervision. Brenda Vale supervised the master's research of Min Hall.

Commissioned by the Australian government, they have developed a unique building rating system called NABERS which measures the ongoing environmental impact of existing buildings. According to Brenda, this is their most important work.

Their controversial 2009 book, Time to Eat the Dog? The Real Guide to Sustainable Living, looks at the environmental impact and "carbon paw prints" (pet-generated carbon footprints) of household pets. Among their research claims is that a medium-sized pet dog has twice the carbon footprint of SUV driven 10,000 kilometres (6,000 miles) per year, based on the estimated energy impact of food production and waste generation. In addition to carbon footprints, they analyse several popular types of pets with respect to their impacts on wildlife populations, spread of disease, and pollution. The title is intended to shock. Mathematical error claims have been made suggesting that the Vales' findings are out by a factor of 20, making the dog less emissions-creating than the car. The authors suggest sharing pets, or raising "edible pets" such as chickens, rabbits or pigs, as a way of reducing or offsetting their environmental impacts. Their 2008 proposal to Wellington City Council ban traditional pets in favour of edible pets was deemed unacceptable to councillors.

The Vales are construction toy collectors, and advocates of instruction-free play for teaching concepts of structure, a foundation of architecture. Their 2013 book, Architecture on the Carpet: The Curious Tale of Construction Toys, examines the thesis that the toys teach children architectural concepts that can later influence an adult architect's style of design. The book looks at vintage sets of Lego, Meccano, Lincoln Logs, and more obscure products in the context of teaching concepts such as modularity and load-bearing construction.

== See also ==
- autonomous building
- green building
- sustainability
- Street Farm

== Publications ==
- Garcia, Emilio Jose; Vale, Brenda (2017). Unravelling Sustainability and Resilience in the Built Environment. Taylor & Francis. ISBN 9781317242970.
- Vale, Brenda; Vale, Robert (2013). Architecture on the Carpet: The Curious Tale of Construction Toys and the Genesis of Modern Buildings. Thomas & Hudson Ltd. ISBN 978-0-500-34285-5.
- Vale, Brenda; Vale, Robert (2009). Time to Eat the Dog?: The Real Guide to Sustainable Living. Thames & Hudson. ISBN 978-0-500-28790-3.
- Vale, Brenda; Vale, Robert (2008). New Domestic Detailing. Butterworth-Heinemann. ISBN 978-0-7506-0605-9.
- Vale, Brenda; Vale, Robert; Mithraratne, N (2007). The Role of Whole Life Costs and Values. Butterworth-Heinemann. ISBN 978-0-7506-8063-9.
- Vale, Brenda; Vale, Robert (2000). The New Autonomous House. Thames & Hudson Ltd. ISBN 0-500-34176-1.
- Vale, Brenda (1995). Prefabs: A History of the UK Temporary Housing Programme. E & IN Spon. ISBN 0-419-18800-2.
- Vale, Brenda; Vale, Robert (1992). Green Architecture: Design for an Energy-Conscious Future. Bulfinch Press Little Brown and Company. ISBN 978-0-8212-1866-2.
- Vale, Brenda; Vale, Robert (1991). Towards a Green Architecture: six practical case studies. RIBA Publications. ISBN 978-0-947877-47-7.
- Vale, Brenda; Vale, Robert; James, D (1980). The Self-Sufficient House: D.I.Y. Techniques for Saving Fuel, Heat and Money. BCA/Macmillan London Ltd. ISBN 978-0-333-25868-2.
- Vale, Brenda; Vale, Robert James Dennis (1975). The Autonomous House: Design and Planning for Self-sufficiency. Universe Books. ISBN 9780876632543.
- Vale, Robert James Dennis (1973). Results of solar collector study. University of Cambridge, Department of Architecture, Technical Research Division.
- Vale, Brenda (1973). The use of on-site building materials. University of Cambridge, Dept. of Architecture, Technical Research Division.

=== Fiction ===
- Vale, Brenda (1982). Albion: a Romance of the Twenty-First Century. Devon, UK: Spindlewood. ISBN 978-0-907349-15-0.
