= The Ark (Prince Edward Island) =

The Ark was a bioshelter constructed in Spry Point, Prince Edward Island, designed by architects David Bergmark and Ole Hammarlund, who relocated from the United States to design the project under their firm's name Solsearch Architects. The other major contributor was a New England ecological research center, called The New Alchemy Institute, which conceptualized the PEI Ark. The goal of the New Alchemy institute was to study non-violent and non-lethal methods to secure the future of humanity as stated by one of the project's participants.

The New Alchemy institute also gathered together intellectuals and activists from ecological and economic movements to promote and work on the PEI Ark Project. Precedents and inspiration for the Ark building were sourced from E. F. Schumacher's Small is Beautiful, Amory Lovins "soft energy paths" concept, and Buckminster Fuller's Operating Manual for Spaceship Earth. Construction began in 1975 and was completed in 1976. The Ark incorporated sustainable architecture technologies developed by the New Alchemy Institute. The end goal of the project was to test if a sustainable building could be built in a harsh Northern climate. A secondary objective of the Canadian government was to test green technologies.

The project was successfully built and gained international media attention in 1976. The cost of the project was $150,000 to construct. The government provided the property for the project and the federal and provincial governments gave grants consisting of a total of $350,000 for research. Four individuals lived in the Ark for about 18 months from its opening in 1976, demonstrating its potential as a residential structure. It was then used for research in alternative energy by the government of Prince Edward Island. Over the next decade it was used for various community and commercial activities, including a motel, before being sold and converted to a restaurant in 1991. The restaurant was sold in the late 1990s and the building was demolished. Today, the Inn at Spry Point stands on the former site of the Ark.

== History ==
=== The Background ===
The PEI Ark was constructed during a wave of environmentally green Architecture across the globe. The social trends that created the interest in green architecture like the Ark; included the youth movements in the 1960s, the global activism in the 1970s, and the ongoing tension of the Cold War. The biggest contribution was the OPEC oil crisis of 1974, which began from a Cold War-era oil embargo. The Canadian government became interested in alternative sources of energy. A public discussion began about human environmental impacts, and food production drove the concept for the Ark, which was meant to demonstrate the viability of alternative energy and sustainable living practices.

=== The Design ===
The New Alchemy Institute was in charge of the project, and had already commissioned one similar building, in a farmstead in Cape Cod. The PEI Ark was an attempt to create a sustainable building (similar to the Cape Cod Ark) in an environment known for having very harsh weather. The New Alchemy Institute wanted to test passive design strategies in winter conditions.

Architects David Bergmark and Ole Hammarlund of Solsearch Architects were hired to design the building. They gave the building a spatial vision that wove together modern building techniques with ecological systems. The building was a precursors to modern green design.

=== The Canadian Government and Opening ===
In 1974 the PEI Arks concept was established with the technical and financial support of the Canadian federal government's Department of Urban Affairs and Environment Canada's Advanced Concepts unit. The PEI government was interested in exploring alternative building development in PEI. Tests were successfully done on the buildings active green systems.

The Ark was inaugurated in 1976 by then-Prime Minister Pierre Trudeau. Its opening was also attended by PEI premier Alex Campbell, and various traditional and counterculture groups. The Ark was a popular destination for tourists in the immediate years after its opening.

=== The Ark's Legacy ===
The Ark was inhabited for 18 months after opening. Ownership was then passed to a provincial agency that used it to test alternative energy. Governmental changes in the following years, with growing disinterest in sustainable buildings, and the difficulty of creating similar buildings caused disinterest in the Ark after a few years. The Ark was repurposed multiple times in the next decade, as a restaurant, community center, bed and breakfast, and motel.

In the 1990s the building was sold and demolished. In its wake, an Inn was constructed.

== Architectural Design ==
Ark Structural and Design Table of Content

=== Structure ===
Length

110 ft

(33.53m)

Max width

48 ft

(14.63m)

Total floor area

5636 ft^{2}

(523.58 m^{2})

Food culture area (aquaculture and greenhouse)

2605 ft^{2}

(242 m^{2})

Laboratory

152 ft^{2}

(14.12 m^{2})

Living component

1247 ft^{2}

(115.85 m^{2})

Barn

440 ft^{2}

(40.88 m^{2})

=== Climate ===
Solar collection :

(a) Hot water collectors

850 ft^{2}

(78.97 m^{2})

(b) South facing translucent roof

2500 ft^{2}

(232.25 m^{2})

Total

3350 ft^{2}

(311.22 m^{2})

Heat storage :

(a) Hot water

21,000 gal

(79,485 liters)

(b) Solar ponds

19,000 gal

(71,915 liters)

(c) Rock chamber

118 yd^{3}

(90.27 m^{3})

(d) Structure interior including concrete

Estimated usable stored heat : 24 million Btu's (6.05 million kcal)

Heat transfer :

(a) Air circulation

(b) Heat pump and hot water circulation

Insulation value

Construction materials :

U factor

Roof : galvanized sheet metal over plywood

U factor

0.5 – 1 ft (15 – 30 cm) fiberglass insulation

.03

Walls : Standard with 4 in (10.16 cm) fiberglass and foam outside

.07

Shutters under translucent roof : 1 in (2.54 cm) form core construction

.10

Translucent roof

Over greenhouse,

Aquaculture zone : Roha glass plexiglass FDP - twin sheet 0.63 (16mm)

.55

Food - production systems :

Aquaculture facility : 40 – 4 ft diameter x 5 ft high

Interconnected solar fiberglass ponds = 18.800 gal (71,158 liters)

Commercial plant - growing area = 1000 ft^{2} (92.90 m^{2})

Resident's interior garden area = 240 ft^{2} (22.30 m^{2})

=== Energy Budget ===
Coldest months

Monthly :

Nov.

Dec.

Jan.

Feb.

Hours bright sun

96

75

110

135

Total solar collection in ^{(a)} million Btu's

35 (8.8)

28 (7.1)

40 (10.1)

50 (12.6)

HYDROWIND* windplant (25 kilowatt) ≈

24 (6.1)

24 (6.1)

24 (6.1)

24 (6.1)

Average wind velocity : 14 - 17 mph in million Btu's

Temperature : average in °C

1.5 °C

- 4 °C

- 8 °C

- 8.5 °C

Total heat loss in million Btu's

24 (6.4)

36 (9.1)

45 (11.3)

46 (11.6)

Surplus heat in million Btu's

35 (8.8)

16 (4)

19 (4.8)

28 (7.1)

Surplus heat million Btu's

28.9 (7.3)

9.9 (2.5)

12.9 (3.3)

21.9 (5.5)

After non - heating systems subtracted = 6.1 million Btu's

Surplus heat = without HYDROWIND*

+ 11 (2.8)

- 8 (- 2)

-5

(- 13)

+ 4 (1)

Electricity generation in million Btu's ^{2(b)}

^{(a)} Figure in parentheses in million kilocalories.

HYDROWIND : Trademark N.A.I. electricity generating 25 kilowatt wind plant.

^{(b)} During December and January auxiliary heating from wood stove and heat pump will be necessary.

=== Sustainable Architectural Technologies used ===
Solar panels that would be used to collect the sun’s energy that would be stored and used, a wind turbine that would generate electricity to be stored and used as addition electrical source, a rock and water heat storage system was used for heat exchange (was located in the basement), insulation heavily fortified the walls and roof system, south facing windows, ultraviolet and infrared-permeable glazing was used on the greenhouse windows, windows located on the greenhouse side that were angled in a way to reflect more winter sunlight onto the solar panels. A greenhouse was incorporated for human and fish food, and was also used as another source to dump waste / manage compost. Giant water tanks to house fish for food production, and heat retention. Locally sourced materials such as wood were used to frame and clad the structure. In addition the thermal mass of the building allowed solar heating to partake throughout the structure. And appliances (mainly consisting of kitchen appliances) that were highly regarded as the “most efficient” of its time were used. An example of an efficient appliance is a wood stove

=== About the Ark design ===
For being in the time era of the 1970’s, the bioshelter’s design was ahead of its time. It offered a self-sustainable to a built environment for a family to live in (family consisting of 4 individuals), and provided all the essential living conditions needed to thrive such as food requirements, energy needs, and waste management. The resulting design properties enabled the individuals who inhabited the building to engage in the ecosystems of their living environment as a new means of lifestyle.

Located on the south side of the Ark’s spatial layout was the greenhouse. The greenhouse space had numerous planting beds to accommodate the growth of healthy plants to eat such as vegetables. In addition to this greenhouse space, there were also large containers (water tanks) which housed fish that were used to farm as another source of food. Both plant and fish worked in cohesion with one another as off trimmings from the plants would be part of the food used to feed the fish. And the tank water which consisted of the byproducts (excrements) of the fish and other organic matter was used as another source of nutrients to aid plant growth.
