= Bioshelter =

A bioshelter is a solar greenhouse managed as an indoor ecosystem. The word bioshelter was coined by the New Alchemy Institute and solar designers Sean Wellesley-Miller and Day Chahroudi. The term was created to distinguish their work in greenhouse design and management from twentieth century petro-chemical fuelled monoculture greenhouses.

== Overview ==
New Alchemy's pioneering work in ecological design is documented in their published Journals and Reports. In 1976 the Alchemists built the Cape Cod Ark bioshelter and her sister The Prince Edward Island Ark. For the next 15 years the New Alchemy Institute studied and reported on the use of these prototype food producing ecosystems.

== Architecture ==
A bioshelter (life-shelter) involves two fields of knowledge and design. The first is architecture designed to nurture an ecosystem within. A bioshelter structure uses glazing to contain and protect the living biology inside, control air exchange and absorb energy. The building exchanges nutrients, gases and energy with the surrounding environment, produces crops, and recycles waste organic material into the soil. Solar energy is stored as heat energy in thermal mass such as water, stone, masonry, soil and plant biomass.

== Biology ==
The second is the biology inside the bioshelter. Earle Barnhart of the New Alchemy Institute has compared a bioshelter to a contained ecosystem. Solar heat is absorbed and stored in thermal mass to moderate air temperatures and provide heat for later use. Water moves from rainfall to fishponds to soil to plants and finally to water vapor. Year-round habitat is provided for beneficial insects . Ecological relationships between pests and their predators reduce the number of pests. Gases are exchanged among the animals, insects, micro-organisms, soil and plants. Nutrient cycles are developed between fish, plant & soil. Within the bioshelter are a variety of microclimates. The south areas receive the most direct sunlight. The east and west areas can be shaded for a portion of the day. Higher levels in a growing space will be warmer. A well-designed bioshelter, managed by human intelligence, can shelter a community of people, food crops, edible fish, and a diverse ecosystem of plants, animals and soil life.
