= Street Farm =

Street Farm was a London-based collective active in the early 1970s, with its origins in the Architectural Association (AA). Its core members were AA students Peter Crump, Bruce Haggart and Graham Caine.

Street Farm was discontinued in around 1976, although Graham Caine and Peter Crump continued to work on sustainable architecture projects in the Bristol area in later years. The group's ideas and projects proved influential as renewable energy and concern for sustainability in architecture became more mainstream in subsequent decades, with leading green architects, including Paul F. Downton and Howard Liddell, citing early encounters with the Street Farmers as important inspirations for their careers.

== Street Farmer ==
In 1971-1972 the group produced a Situationist-inspired magazine called Street Farmer, which combined witty graphics with ideas about what they termed the 'transmogrification' of the urban environment. Attacking the complicity of architects in state and capitalist control of cities, Street Farm advocated communities self-organised on anarchist principles, making use of autonomous housing and the kind of liberatory technology favoured by social ecologist Murray Bookchin.

In addition to the alternative-press publication Street Farmer, they pursued other agit-prop media projects, touring throughout England and Wales to present multimedia shows at schools of architecture and beyond, and participating in events in the Netherlands and Italy. Street Farm's ideas were also promoted by appearances on two BBC television programmes. The first was aired as a part of the documentary series Open Door produced by the BBC's Community Programme Unit (broadcast 18 June 1973). Melvyn Bragg presented the second documentary, Clearings in the Concrete Jungle, as part of the 2nd House series (broadcast 24 January 1976).

== The First Ecological House ==
In 1972 Street Farm applied their political aspirations and visions to the practical project of Street Farmhouse, in Eltham, London, the first intentionally constructed ecological house. This was designed and constructed by Graham Caine with the assistance of Bruce Haggart and other friends in 1972, sited on Thames Polytechnic's playing fields. Their objective with the Street Farm House was to create an autonomous home that exploited reused materials and alternative technology, harnessing microgeneration and sewage recycling in order to liberate the occupants from dependence upon services provided by the state or private suppliers.

Following a front page feature in The Observer by Gerald Leach the experimental house attracted considerable attention, chiming with emerging concerns about ecological sustainability and energy security. Lord Holford commended Caine's efforts in a debate in the House of Lords during a reading of the Protection of the Environment Bill in 1973. Despite such attention, however, Street Farmhouse, was relatively short-lived. A request to extend the structure's temporary planning permission on behalf of Graham Caine and his partner and daughter was refused, leading to the dismantlement of their home in 1975.

== See also ==
- Autonomous building
- Brenda and Robert Vale
- Ecological Building
- Stadthaus
