= New Alchemy Institute =

American research institute, 1969–1991

Coordinates: 41°36′49.8″N 70°34′34.6″W

The New Alchemy Institute (NAI) was an American research center that did pioneering investigation into organic agriculture, aquaculture and bioshelter design between 1969 and 1991. The Green Center was established as a non-profit educational organisation to continue its mission, and houses the NAI's many research and education publications, published between 1971 and 1991.

== History ==
The New Alchemy Institute (NAI) was founded in 1969 by John Todd, a marine biologist; his wife, Nancy Jack Todd, writer and activist; and William (Bill) McLarney, a fish biologist. It was situated on a 12-acre (49,000 m^{2}) block of land on Cape Cod that was once a dairy farm, near the Falmouth village of Hatchville.

They improved the soil quality, planted food crops, started breeding rabbits, and dug fish ponds. The pond accommodated farmed tilapia, at that time relatively unknown, introduced by McLarney. Over time, other friends and colleagues joined them at NAI. The National Film Board of Canada made a documentary film about them in 1973, portraying the settlement as an "Arcadian utopia". Their techniques married scientific methods with common sense; everything was monitored and analysed, but John Todd believed that natural systems could be duplicated, harnessed, and connected.

In 1982, John Todd founded Ocean Arks International, which still exists.

Federal government grants dried up as the Reagan administration ruled during the 1980s, and the NAI struggled to survive financially. It eventually closed in 1991.

After its demise, former New Alchemists Hilda Maingay and Earle Barnhart established The Green Center, a non-profit educational institute that evolved from NAI, with the aim of continuing its mission.

== Purpose ==
The New Alchemy Institute's purpose was to research human support systems of food, water, and shelter and to completely rethink how these systems were designed. It aimed to "create ecologically-derived human support systems", including the use of renewable energy. Their stated aim was to do research on behalf of the planet:

"Among our major tasks is the creation of ecologically derived human support systems - renewable energy, agriculture, aquaculture, housing and landscapes. The strategies we research emphasize a minimal reliance on fossil fuels and operate on a scale accessible to individuals, families and small groups. It is our belief that ecological and social transformations must take place at the lowest functional levels of society if humankind is to direct its course towards a greener, saner world.

Our programs are geared to produce not riches, but rich and stable lives, independent of world fashion and the vagaries of international economics. The New Alchemists work at the lowest functional level of society on the premise that society, like the planet itself, can be no healthier than the components of which it is constructed. The urgency of our efforts is based on our belief that the industrial societies which now dominate the world are in the process of destroying it.")

== Areas of research ==
=== Bioshelters ===
A bioshelter is a solar greenhouse that is managed as a self-contained ecosystem. The groupings of plants, animals, soil and insects are selected so that closed loops of life cycles, materials, water, and energy are created, and require minimal inputs from outside the system. They emulate natural rhythms of growth and cycling of nutrients, meaning the practice of organic farming, the use of renewable energy, creation of sustainable architecture, and ensuring the restoration of ecosystems.

New Alchemy built two bioshelters, designed by David Bergmark and Ole Hammarlund, both young architects from Yale University. "The Ark" was built at the Cape Cod property, and then, commissioned by the Canadian Government, "The Prince Edward Island Ark" was built at Spry Point, Prince Edward Island, Canada. The latter was built in 1976 and opened by Pierre Trudeau, prime minister of Canada. The Todds' friend Nancy Willis lived there with her family for some years. Over time, financial support dried up as governments changed, and, after being converted into a small hotel and restaurant in the early 1980s and various other attempts to save it, it was demolished around 2000.

=== Organic agriculture ===
New Alchemy investigated the practices of organic agriculture for both field crops, and greenhouse growing. They researched intensive gardening, biological pest control, cover cropping, irrigation using fish pond water, perennial food crops, and tree crops.

=== Aquaculture ===
New Alchemy experimented with growing edible fish in ponds in the bioshelters. The solar aquaculture ponds were above-ground, translucent tanks. The fertile pond water was used for irrigating the crops in the greenhouses. This proved to be a successful way to raise edible fish, floating hydroponic crops, and irrigated greenhouse food crops.

== Publications ==
The research conducted at New Alchemy was documented in a series of journals and technical bulletins. A complete list of their publications between 1971 and 1991 is available at The Green Center, a non-profit educational institute that evolved from The New Alchemy Institute.
