= Saskatchewan Conservation House =

Energy efficient house in Regina, Saskatchewan

Coordinates: 50°29′14″N 104°39′22″W

The Saskatchewan Conservation House (211 Rink Ave, Regina, Saskatchewan, Canada) is an early exemplar of energy-efficient building construction that introduced best practices for addressing air leakage in houses. It was designed in response to the energy crisis of the 1970s at the request of the Government of Saskatchewan. The Saskatchewan Conservation House pioneered the use of superinsulation and airtightness in passive design and included one of the earliest heat recovery systems. The house did not require a furnace, despite prairie winter temperatures as low as −24 °C (−11 °F) at night.

In 1977, when it was built at 211 Rink Avenue in the Walsh Acres neighborhood of Regina, Saskatchewan, Canada, the house was the world's most airtight house. The cost of the electricity to heat the house was estimated as $30–40 for a year. The house's building envelope continues to perform as designed, more than 40 years later.

For its first two years, the Saskatchewan Conservation House could be viewed by the public as a model house. In 1978 as many as 1,000 visitors a week visited it. The Saskatchewan Conservation House influenced the development of energy efficiency building codes both in Canada and internationally. It shaped the field of energy-efficient construction, including passive solar building design and the German passive house. In April 2015, Germany's Passive House Institute gave its designers a Pioneer Award for the design and construction of the house.

== Project ==
In response to the energy crisis of the 1970s, the Government of Saskatchewan asked the Saskatchewan Research Council (SRC) to design and build a solar house that would be "appropriate for Saskatchewan". The house would have to be capable of staying warm despite short winter days and night-time winter temperatures of −24 °C (−11 °F).

A committee was formed with participation from the Saskatchewan Research Council, the University of Saskatchewan, the Building Research Division of the National Research Council (NRC) of Canada, and others. Members included R.W. Besant, Rob Dumont, Dave Eyre, Harry Filson, Bill Gibbons, George Green, Hendrik Grolle, Dave Jennings, Garry Marvin, Deryl Thomson, and lead engineer Harold Orr.

== Design ==
One of the first steps taken by Orr's team was to estimate the energy requirements of powering a standard 1970s house with solar power. Their calculations showed that the water-based energy storage technology of the time was inadequate to meet the needs of such a house. The team chose a different approach, that of radically reducing the house's energy demand.

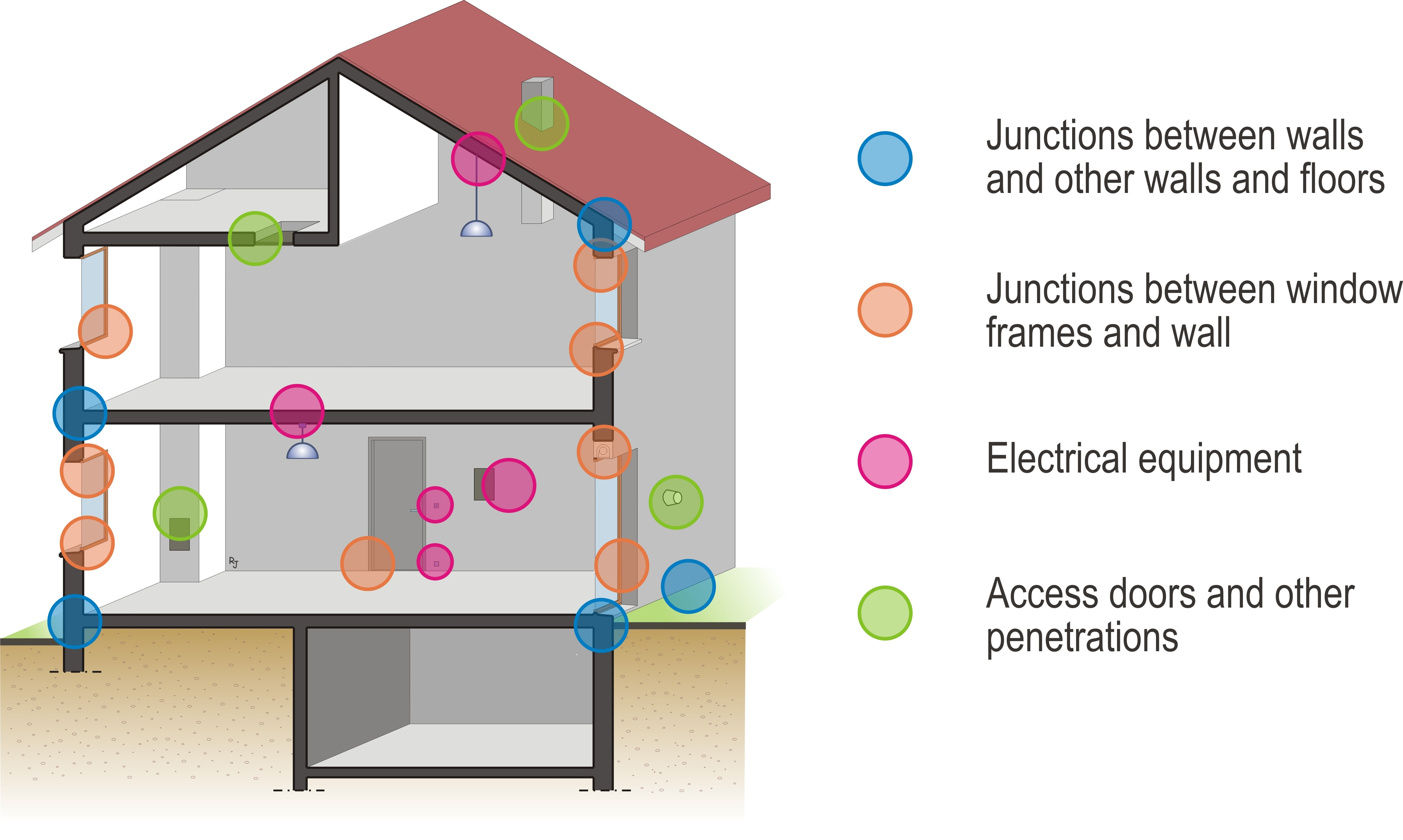
Common air leakage points

The total energy consumption of a house reflects several factors relating to its building envelope: (1) heat loss through windows, walls, and ceiling, (2) heat loss through the basement, and (3) air leakage.

As one of the principal designers of the Saskatchewan Conservation House, Orr suggested a radical increase in insulation of the walls, ceiling and foundation, and the use of airtight construction techniques. Orr has compared the difference between the two approaches to designing a coffeemaker vs. designing a thermos bottle. A coffeemaker keeps things warm while it is plugged in and turned on, while a thermos stays warm once it is filled without adding more energy. The resulting house incorporated three key elements: superinsulation, extreme airtightness, and one of the first heat-recovery ventilators.

At a time when most Canadian houses had 4-inch-thick (100 mm) walls with an insulation R-value of r-8, the Saskatchewan Conservation House had 12-inch-thick (300 mm) walls with r-40 insulation and a roof with r-60 insulation, increasing the house's insulation to approximately six times compared to the standard. Rather than having a basement, it was raised off the ground to further prevent heat loss to the ground. The raised floor system included a crawl space with r-20 insulation. Orr estimated that suspending the floor above the soil level could mitigate 80 percent of the downward heat loss.

At a time when single-panel windows were the norm and high-grade windows were r-2, the Saskatchewan Conservation House used triple-glazed windows in deep window enclosures. The designers also tried adding a system of shutters that could be used to prevent heat loss, but the shutters were not particularly successful. The house was laid out to take advantage of the Sun when possible, with living accommodations and windows facing south. Large trees were planted to the north to provide a wind buffer, while the south side was left clear to the Sun.

To prevent air leakage and achieve extreme airtightness, Orr and his colleagues installed a vapor barrier themselves. Local contractors did not have the expertise they needed for their experimental technique. They built a double wall, using the outer wall for the structure and placing the vapor barrier on the internal wall, then adding inexpensive blown mineral fibre for insulation.

Because the house was extremely air-tight, the designers built an air-to-air heat exchanger to move fresh air into the house through a series of baffles. On the other side of the baffles, stale indoor air was pushed out. The design transferred heat from the warm exhaust air being released to the cold incoming air.

The Saskatchewan Conservation House did not have a furnace. The cost of electricity to heat the house was estimated at $30–40 for a year. An experimental solar heating system with a 17.9 m^{2} (193 sq ft) array of vacuum-tube solar collectors collected heat from sunlight during the day, storing it in a 12,700-litre (2,800 imp gal; 3,400 US gal) water tank insulated to about r-100. Pumps and heat exchangers could use the stored heat to heat the house at night or heat water. Solar gains during the winter were small, so the angle of the array was optimised.

== Assessment ==
The Saskatchewan Conservation House was the most airtight house in the world at the time it was built. Its conservation measures, such as insulation, airtightness, and its ventilation system, were highly effective.

A blower door was used to obtain a standardized measurement of the number of times per hour that a fan could suck all of the air out of a house at a prescribed pressure of 50 pascals (0.0073 psi). At the time most new Canadian houses scored around 9 air changes per hour (ACH) at 50 Pa. On average, an existing Canadian home had 1,384 square centimetres (214.5 sq in) of air gaps, resulting in ratings of around 6.85 ach@50pa. In contrast, the Saskatchewan Conservation House achieved measures of 0.8 ach@50pa. Air remained fresh due to the inclusion of an air-to-air heat exchanger that used waste heat from vented air to warm fresh air as it was moved into the house.

== Challenges ==
The Saskatchewan Conservation House project faced challenges, including the government-mandated inclusion of a solar hot-water system that proved to be expensive and inefficient. The solar component was new and experimental. It cost around $65,000 to build, more than the total cost for the rest of the house, which cost around $60,000. The prototype solar system was also extremely costly to maintain. Even though the electricity to power the system cost a few dollars a month, maintenance during its first year cost approximately $10,000.

Orr's takeaway from the project was that:

Conservation is much less expensive than solar. For every dollar we spent on reducing heat loss from the house, with a better air barrier and more insulation, we saved at least $10 on the size of solar collectors and equipment needed to achieve the same thing. – Harold Orr, 2013

== Subsequent use ==
The Saskatchewan Conservation House was used for two years as a model show house. It was then sold to a private owner, who removed the solar component. Its building envelope continues to perform as designed, more than 40 years later.

== Impact ==
The Saskatchewan Conservation House became a model for low-energy house design.

Its design approach of treating the "house as a system" became the basis of a voluntary national building standard. The standard included r-20 insulation, blower-door ratings of 1.5 ach@50pa or better, incorporation of a heat-recovery ventilator, and use of non-toxic materials. The new standard was supported by Natural Resources Canada (NRCan) and the Canadian Home Builders' Association (CHBA). At the time, it was the most stringent standard in the world. It was introduced decades before green building initiatives such as LEED (Leadership in Energy and Environmental Design) and Built Green.

The elements used in the project paved the way for the development of the Natural Resources Canada R-2000 standard and its integration into the Canadian national building code. They led to the establishment of new national energy conservation protocols, the Energuide Energy efficiency building codes, for use in Canadian buildings. Fourteen similar houses were constructed in Saskatoon in the mid-1980s, using principles from the Saskatchewan Conservation House.

The Saskatchewan Conservation House also became a model for the international Passive House (Passivhaus) building energy efficiency standard. The Passivhaus standard was developed by Austrian physicist Wolfgang Feist and Swedish structural engineer Bo Adamson. After studying early superinsulated homes, including the Saskatchewan Conservation House, Feist stated a mathematical formula for the design of high-performance buildings, which was published in his thesis Passive Houses in Central Europe (1993).

Feist's standard has two hard limits: airtightness of a building must meet or exceed 0.6 ach@50pa, and its total energy use for heating and cooling must not exceed 15 kilowatt hours (kwh) per square metre of floor area. A building built to this standard can reduce energy consumption by 80 to 90 percent, compared to conventional construction. It is well enough insulated that it does not require an "active" furnace or boiler, hence the term "passivhaus". Buildings are certified to the passivhaus standard.

The first passivhaus to be built, in 1991, was the Darmstadt-Kranichstein Passive House, a row of four townhouses in Darmstadt, Germany. Since then, the passive house approach has become influential in Germany and other areas of Europe. In April 2015, Germany's Passive House Institute gave the designers of the Saskatchewan Conservation House a Pioneer Award for its design and construction.

Ironically, adoption of the approach has been slower in Canada than in Europe. Canada's first passive house was assembled in Whistler, B.C., using prefabricated components from Austria, for use at the 2010 Winter Olympics. The building used about one-tenth of the energy of a comparable-size conventional building, with a heating cost of $280 a year in 2011. In Saskatchewan, the first house to apply for official certification as a passive house was the Temperance Street Passive House, in 2016. It uses many of the principles that were introduced in the Saskatchewan Conservation House in 1977.
