= Pook =

Pook may refer to:

- Pook, Kalibo, a barangay of Kalibo, Aklan, Philippines
- Pook (surname) includes list of persons with the name
- Pook (Wee 3), character in children's TV series Wee 3

== See also ==
- Puck (disambiguation)
- Pooky (disambiguation)
