= Innovation Saskatchewan =

Canadian government agency

- Formation: 2009
- Type: Agency
- Headquarters: Saskatoon, Saskatchewan, Canada
- Region served: Saskatchewan
- CEO: Kari Harvey, CEO
- Parent organization: Government of Saskatchewan
- Website: www.innovationsask.ca

Innovation Saskatchewan is an arms length agency of the Government of Saskatchewan in Canada. The agency is responsible for assessing and advising government on science and technology;

== See also ==
- Saskatchewan Research Council
