= Blower door =

Machine used during air leakage testing

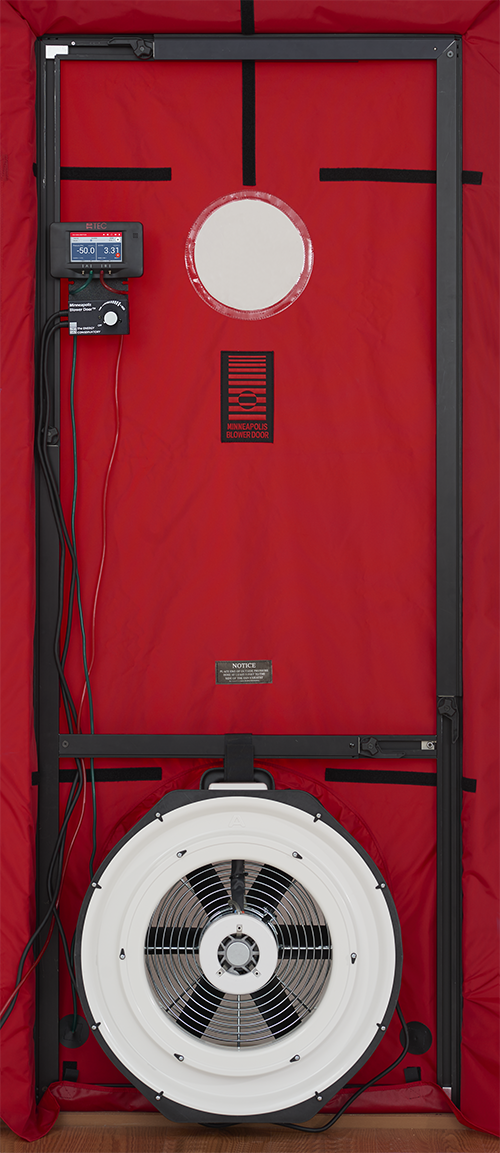
Single fan blower door system

A blower door is a machine used to perform a building air leakage test. It can also be used to measure airflow between building zones, to test ductwork airtightness and to help physically locate air leakage sites in the building envelope.

There are three primary components to a blower door: a calibrated, variable-speed blower or fan, capable of inducing a range of airflows sufficient to pressurize and depressurize a variety of building sizes; a pressure measurement instrument, called a manometer, to simultaneously measure the pressure differential induced across the face of the fan and across the building envelope, as a result of fan airflow; and a mounting system, used to mount the fan in a building opening, such as a door or a window.

Airtightness testing is usually thought of in residential settings. It is becoming more common in commercial settings. The General Services Administration (GSA) requires testing of new US federal government buildings.

A variety of blower door air tightness metrics can be produced using the combination of building-to-outside pressure and fan airflow measurements. These metrics differ in their measurement methods, calculation and uses. Blower door tests are used by building researchers, weatherization crews, home performance contractors, home energy auditors, and others in efforts to assess the construction quality of the building envelope, locate air leakage pathways, assess how much ventilation is supplied by the air leakage, assess the energy losses resulting from that air leakage, determine if the building is too tight or too loose, determine if the building needs mechanical ventilation and to assess compliance with building performance standards.

== History ==
In Sweden blower door technology was first used to measure building air tightness in 1977. The earliest implementation in Sweden used a fan mounted in a window, rather than a door. By 1979, similar window-mounted measurement techniques were being pursued in Texas, and door-mounted test fans were being developed by a team at Princeton University to help them find and fix air leaks in homes in a Twin Rivers, New Jersey housing development.

In Canada the initial concept similarly involved the use of a blower window, which was first utilized by G. T. Tamura in Ottawa, Canada, as part of a Division of Building Research study to test houses in Ottawa in 1967–1968 and was published in 1975.

In Canada, a team at the National Research Council of Canada's Division of Building Research (NRC/DBR) in Saskatchewan, advanced the published work of Tamura in 1975 and went from a blower window to a blower door concept used in the construction of the Saskatchewan Conservation House in 1977. The Saskatchewan group was actively involved in the development of the blower door in 1977-78 and published their findings in 1980. They made available their flow nozzle to interested companies including one from Minneapolis. Harold Orr, who had been in Ottawa in 1967 when Tamura was conducting his work, continued to work on blower door technology after Tamura published his paper. Tamura's blower window concept from 1967, preceded the Swedish work in 1977 by a decade. The first blower door was further used to test the airtightness of the Saskatchewan Conservation House built in 1977, which was tested at 0.5 ach at 50 Pa.

These early research efforts demonstrated the potential power of blower door testing in revealing otherwise unaccounted for energy losses in homes. Previously, air leakage around doors, windows and electrical outlets was considered to be the primary leakage pathway in homes, but Harrje, Dutt and Beya used blower doors to identify thermal bypasses. These bypasses were air leakage sites, such as attic utility chases, that accounted for the largest percentage of air leakage energy loss in most homes. Use of blower doors in home energy retrofitting and weatherization efforts became known as "house doctoring" by researchers on the east and west United States coasts.

The blower door first became commercially available in the United States in 1980 under the name Gadsco. Harmax started to sell units in 1981, followed closely by The Energy Conservatory in 1982.

While these blower door-testing efforts were useful in identifying leakage pathways and in accounting for otherwise inexplicable energy losses, the results could not be used to determine real-time air exchange in buildings under natural conditions, or even to determine average annual air exchange levels. Sherman attributes the first attempt at doing this to Persily and Kronvall, who estimated annual average air exchange by:

$ACH_{natural} = {ACH_{at 50 pascal}\over20}\,\!$

$ACH_{natural}$ = Natural Air Changes per Hour [1/h]

$ACH_{at 50 pascal}\,\!$ = Air Changes per Hour at 50 pascal [1/h]

Further physical modeling efforts allowed for the development and validation of an infiltration model by researchers at Lawrence Berkeley National Laboratory (LBNL). This model combined data derived from blower door tests with annual weather data to generate time-resolved ventilation rates for a given home in a specific location. This model has been incorporated into the ASHRAE Handbook of Fundamentals (1989), and it has been used in the development of ASHRAE Standards 119 and 136. Other infiltration models have been developed elsewhere, including one by Deru and Burns at the National Renewable Energy Laboratory (NREL), for use in whole-building performance simulation.

== How blower door tests work ==
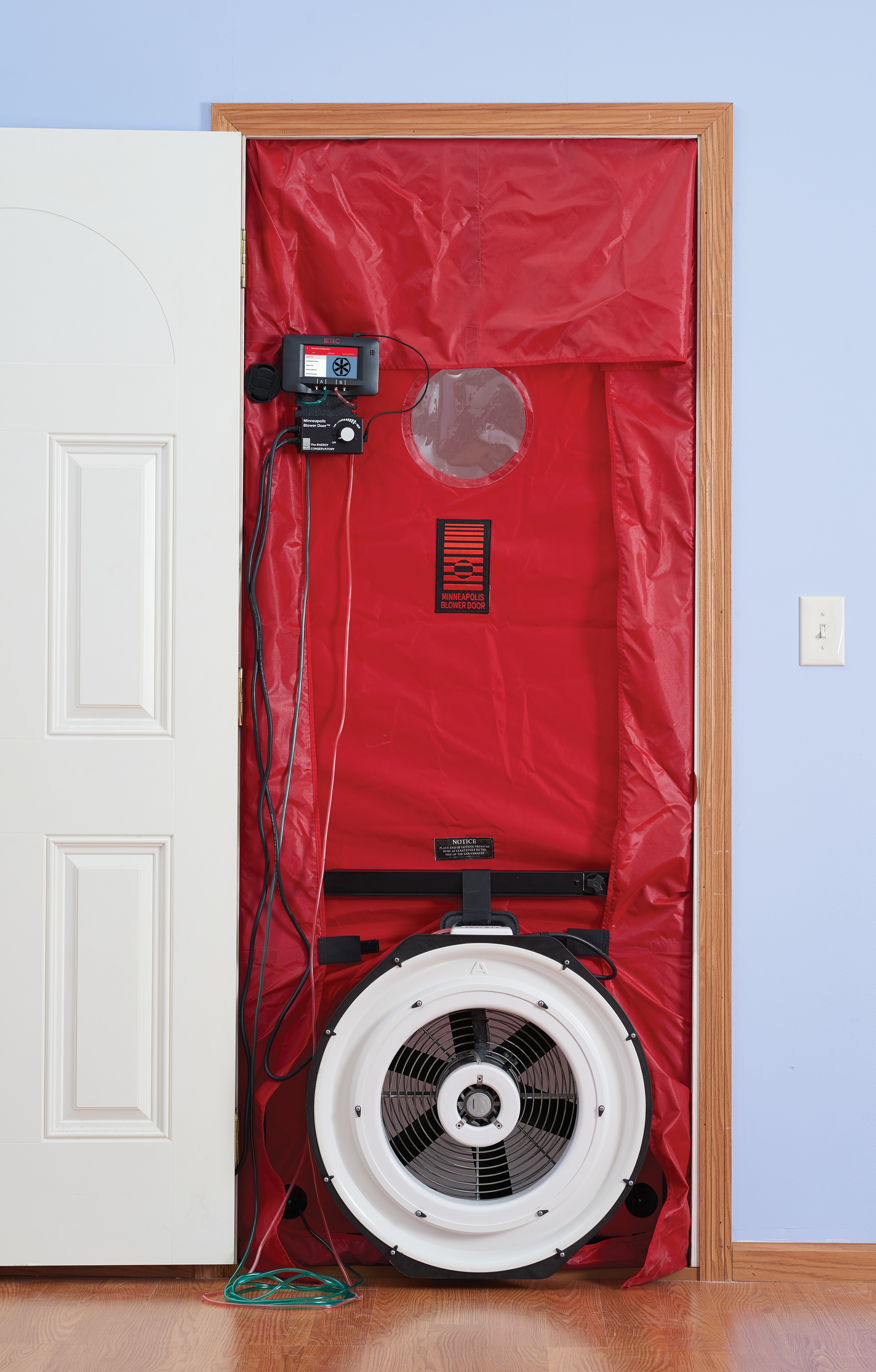
Blower door setup in doorway with a digital pressure and flow gauge

A basic blower door system includes three components: a calibrated fan, a door panel system, and a pressure measurement device (manometer).

=== Test setup ===
The blower door fan is temporarily sealed into an exterior doorway using the door panel system. All interior doors are opened, and all exterior doors and windows are closed. HVAC balancing dampers and registers are not to be adjusted, and fireplaces and other operable dampers should be closed. All mechanical exhaust devices in the home, such as bathroom exhaust, kitchen range hood or dryer, should be turned off. Pressure tubing is used to measure the fan pressure, and it is also run to the exterior of the building, so that the indoor/outdoor pressure differential can be measured. The exterior pressure sensor should be shielded from wind and direct sunlight. The test begins by sealing the face of the fan and measuring the baseline indoor/outdoor pressure differential. The average value is to be subtracted from all indoor/outdoor pressure differential measurements during the test.

=== Test procedure ===
The blower door fan is used to blow air into or out of the building, creating either a positive or negative pressure differential between inside and outside. This pressure difference forces air through all holes and penetrations in the building enclosure. The tighter the building (e.g. fewer holes), the less air is needed from the blower door fan to create a change in building pressure. Typically, only depressurization testing is performed, but both depressurization and pressurization are preferable. Different values for blower door metrics are to be expected for pressurizing and depressurizing, due to the building envelope's response to directional airflow. The smallest fan ring that allows the fan to reach the maximum target indoor/outdoor pressure differential should be used. A multi-point test can be performed either manually or using data acquisition and fan control software products. The manual test consists of adjusting the fan to maintain a series of indoor/outdoor pressure differentials and recording the resulting average fan and indoor/outdoor pressures. Alternatively, a single-point test can be performed, where the blower door fan is ramped up to a reference indoor/outdoor pressure differential and the fan pressure is recorded. Often the blower door hardware converts fan pressure measurements directly to fan airflow values.

== Power law model of airflow ==
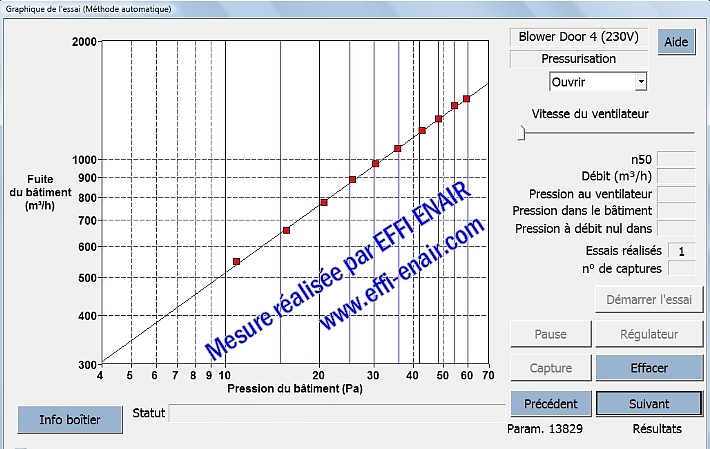
A typical graph of air leakage vs. pressure (in French)

Building leakage is described by a power law equation of flow through an orifice. The orifice flow equation is typically expressed as

$Q = C{\Delta}P^n\,\!$

$Q\,\!$ =Airflow (m^{3}/s)
$C\,\!$ = Air leakage coefficient
${\Delta}P\,\!$ = Pressure differential (Pa)
$n\,\!$ = Pressure exponent

The C parameter reflects the size of the orifice, the ∆P is the pressure differential across the orifice, and the n parameter represents the characteristic shape of the orifice, with values ranging from 0.5 to 1, representing a perfect orifice and a very long, thin crack, respectively.

There are two airflows to be determined in blower door testing, airflow through the fan (Q_{Fan}) and airflow through the building envelope (Q_{Building}).

$Q_{Fan} = C_{Fan}{{\Delta}P_{Fan}}^{n_{Fan}}\,\!$

$Q_{Building} = C_{Building}{{\Delta}P_{Building}}^{n_{Building}}\,\!$

It is assumed in blower door analysis that mass is conserved, resulting in:

$Q_{Fan} = Q_{Building}\,\!$

Which results in:

$C_{Fan}{{\Delta}P_{Fan}}^{n_{Fan}} = C_{Building}{{\Delta}P_{Building}}^{n_{Building}}\,\!$

Fan airflow is determined using C_{Fan} and n_{Fan} values that are provided by the blower door manufacturer, and they are used to calculate Q_{Fan}. The multi-point blower door test procedure results in a series of known values of Q_{n, Fan} and ∆P_{n, Building}. Typical ∆P_{n, Building} values are ±5, 10, 20, 30, 40 and 50 pascal. Ordinary least squares regression analysis is then used to calculate the leakage characteristics of the building envelope: C_{Building} and n_{Building}. These leakage characteristics of the building envelope can then be used to calculate how much airflow will be induced through the building envelope for a given pressure difference caused by wind, temperature difference or mechanical forces. 50 Pa can be plugged into the orifice-flow equation, along with the derived building C and n values to calculate airflow at 50 pascal. This same method can be used to calculate airflow at a variety of pressures, for use in creation of other blower door metrics.

An alternative approach to the multi-point procedure is to only measure fan airflow and building pressure differential at a single test point, such as 50 Pa, and then use an assumed pressure exponent, n_{Building} in the analysis and generation of blower door metrics. This method is preferred by some for two main reasons: (1) measuring and recording one data point is easier than recording multiple test points, and (2) the measurements are least reliable at very low building pressure differentials, due both to fan calibration and to wind effects.

== Air density corrections ==
In order to increase the accuracy of blower door test results, air density corrections should be applied to all airflow data. This must be done prior to the derivation of building air leakage coefficients ($C_{Building}\,\!$) and pressure exponents ($n_{Building}\,\!$). The following methods are used to correct blower door data to standard conditions.

For depressurization testing, the following equation should be used:

$Q_{Corrected} = Q_{Measured}*{\rho_{In} \over \rho_{Out}}\,\!$

$Q_{Corrected}\,\!$ = Airflow corrected to actual air density
$Q_{Measured}\,\!$ = Airflow derived using $C_{Fan}\,\!$ and $n_{Fan}\,\!$
$\rho_{In}\,\!$ = Air density inside the building, during testing
$\rho_{Out}\,\!$ = Air density outside the building, during testing

For pressurization testing, the following equation should be used:

$Q_{Corrected} = Q_{Measured}*{\rho_{Out} \over \rho_{In}}\,\!$

The values ${\rho_{Out} \over \rho_{In}}\,\!$ and ${\rho_{In} \over \rho_{Out}}\,\!$ are referred to as air density correction factors in product literature. They are often tabulated in easy to use tables in product literature, where a factor can be determined from outside and inside temperatures. If such tables are not used, the following equations will be required to calculate air densities.

$\rho_{In}\,\!$ can be calculated in IP units using the following equation:

$\rho_{In} = 0.07517*(1-{0.0035666*E \over 528})^{5.2553}*({528 \over T_{In}+460})\,\!$

$\rho_{In}\,\!$ = Air density inside the building, during testing
$E\,\!$ = Elevation above sea level (ft)
$T_{In}\,\!$ = Indoor temperature (F)

$\rho_{Out}\,\!$ can be calculated in IP units using the following equation:

$\rho_{Out} = 0.07517*(1-{0.0035666*E \over 528})^{5.2553}*({528 \over T_{Out}+460})\,\!$

$\rho_{Out}\,\!$ = Air density outside the building, during testing
$E\,\!$ = Elevation above sea level (ft)
$T_{Out}\,\!$ = Outdoor temperature (F)

In order to translate the airflow values derived using $C_{Fan}\,\!$ and $n_{Fan}\,\!$ from the blower door manufacturer to the actual volumetric airflow through the fan, use the following:

$Q_{Actual} = Q_{Fan}*\sqrt{\rho_{Ref} \over \rho_{Actual}}\,\!$

$Q_{Actual}\,\!$ = Actual volumetric airflow through the fan
$Q_{Fan}\,\!$ = Volumetric airflow calculated using manufacturer's coefficients or software
$\rho_{Ref}\,\!$ = Reference air density (typically 1.204 for kg/m^{3} or 0.075 for lb/ft^{3})
$\rho_{Actual}\,\!$ = Actual density of air going through the fan $\rho_{In}\,\!$ for depressurization and $\rho_{Out}\,\!$ for pressurization

== Blower door metrics ==
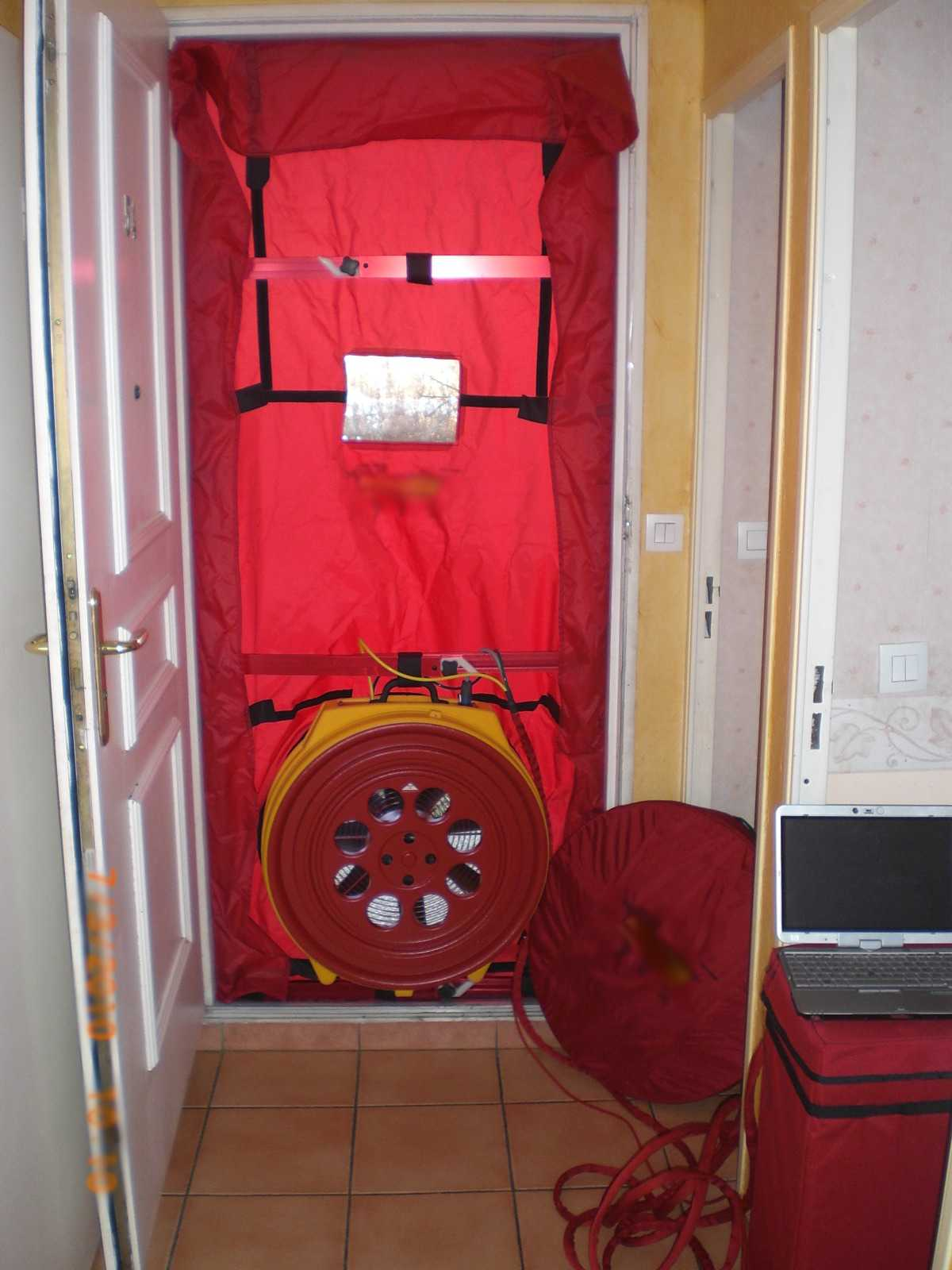
Blower door installation (France)

Depending on how a blower door test is performed, a wide variety of airtightness and building airflow metrics can be derived from the gathered data. Some of the most common metrics and their variations are discussed below. The examples below use the SI pressure measurement unit Pascal (pa). Imperial measurement units are commonly water column inches (WC Inch or IWC). The conversion rate is 1 WC inch = 249 Pa. Examples below use the commonly accepted pressure of 50pa which is 20% of 1 IWC.

=== Airflow at a specified building pressure ===
This is the first metric that results from a Blower Door Test. The airflow, (Imperial in Cubic Feet / minute; SI in liters / second) at a given building-to-outside pressure differential, 50 pascal (Q_{50}). This standardized single-point test allows for comparison between homes measured at the same reference pressure. This is a raw number reflecting only the flow of air through the fan. Homes of different sizes and similar envelope quality will have different results in this test.

=== Airflow per unit surface area or floor area ===
Often, an effort is made to control for building size and layout by normalizing the airflow at a specified building pressure to either the building's floor area or to its total surface area. These values are generated by taking the airflow rate through the fan and dividing by the area. These metrics are most used to assess construction and building envelope quality, because they normalize the total building leakage area to the total amount of area through which that leakage could occur. In other words, how much leakage occurs per unit area of wall, floor, ceiling, etc.

=== Air changes per hour at a specified building pressure ===
Another common metric is the air changes per hour at a specified building pressure, again, typically at 50 Pa (ACH_{50}).

$ACH_{50} = {Q_{50}*60\over V_{Building}}\,\!$

$ACH_{50}\,\!$ = Air changes per hour at 50 pascal (h^{−1})
$Q_{50}\,\!$ = Airflow at 50 pascal (ft^{3}/minute or m^{3}/minute)
$V_{Building}\,\!$ = Building volume (ft^{3} or m^{3})

This normalizes the airflow at a specified building pressure by the building's volume, which allows for more direct comparison of homes of different sizes and layouts. This metric indicates the rate at which the air in a building is replaced with outside air, and as a result, is an important metric in determinations of indoor air quality.

=== Effective leakage area ===
In order to take values generated by fan pressurization and to use them in determining natural air exchange, the effective leakage area of a building must be calculated. Each gap and crack in the building envelope contributes a certain amount of area to the total leakage area of the building. The Effective Leakage Area assumes that all of the individual leakage areas in the building are combined into a single idealized orifice or hole. This value is typically described to building owners as the area of a window that is open 24/7, 365 in their building. The ELA will change depending on the reference pressure used to calculate it. 4 Pa is typically used in the US, whereas a reference pressure of 10 Pa is used in Canada. It is calculated as follows:

$ELA = C_{Building}*\sqrt{\rho \over 2}*{\Delta}P_{Ref}^{n_{Building}-0.5}\,\!$

$ELA\,\!$ = Effective Leakage Area (m^{2} or in^{2})
$C_{Building}\,\!$ = Building air leakage coefficient
$\rho\,\!$ = Air density (kg/m^{3} or lb/in^{3}), typically a standard density is used
${\Delta}P_{Ref}\,\!$ = Reference pressure (Pa or lb_{Force}/in^{2}), typically 4 Pa in US and 10 Pa in Canada
$n_{Building}\,\!$ = Building pressure exponent

It is essential that units are carefully conserved in these calculations. C_{Building} and n_{Building} should be calculated using SI units, and ρ and ∆P_{Reference} should be kg/m^{3} and pascal, respectively. Alternatively, C_{Building} and n_{Building} can be calculated using Imperial units, with ρ and ∆P_{Reference} being lb/ft^{3} and lb_{Force}/in^{2}, respectively.

The ELA can be used, along with the Specific Infiltration Rate(s) derived using the LBNL infiltration model, to determine airflow rate through the building envelope throughout the year.

=== Leakage area per unit floor or surface area ===
Leakage area estimates can also be normalized for the size of the enclosure being tested, For example, the LEED Green Building Rating System has set an airtightness standard for multi-family dwelling units of 1.25 square inches (8.1 cm^{2}) of leakage area per 100 square feet (9.3 m^{2}) of enclosure area, to control tobacco smoke between units. This is equal to 0.868 cm^{2}/m^{2}.

=== Normalized leakage ===
Normalized leakage is a measure of the tightness of a building envelope relative to the building size and number of stories. Normalized leakage is defined in ASHRAE Standard 119 as:

$NL = 1000*({ELA \over A_{Floor}})*({H \over H_{Ref}})^{0.3}\,\!$

$NL\,\!$ = Normalized leakage
$ELA\,\!$ = Effective Leakage Area (m^{2} or in^{2})
$A_{Floor}\,\!$ = Building floor area (m^{2} or in^{2})
$H\,\!$ = Building height (m or in)
$H_{Ref}\,\!$ = Reference height (2.5 metres (98 in))

== Applications ==
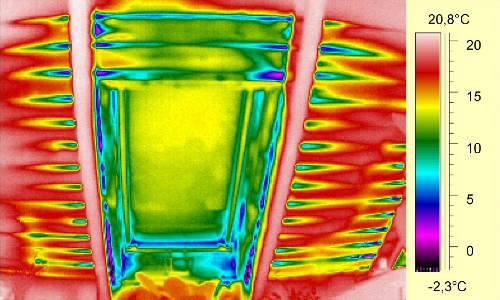
Infrared view of leaky window pressurized by blower door testing

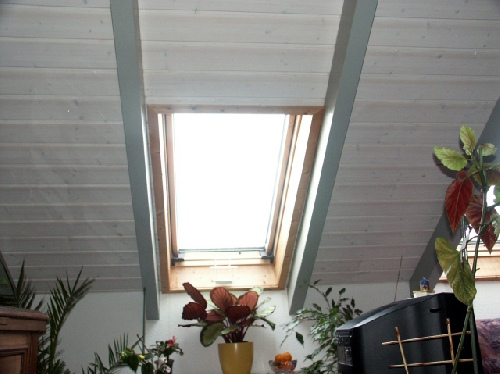
Visible light view of window under test

Blower doors can be used in a variety of types of testing. These include (but are not limited to):

- Testing residential and commercial buildings for air tightness
- Testing buildings at mid-construction to identify and correct any failures in the enclosure
- Testing buildings for compliance with standards for energy efficiency, such as the IECC and ASHRAE.
- Testing building envelopes and window frames for water tightness and rain penetration
- NFPA Clean Agent Retention testing (this type of testing is usually described as a door fan test rather than a blower door test)
- Duct leakage testing of forced air heating/cooling systems - both supply (vents) ducts and return ducts can be tested to determine if and how much they leak air. A duct test can be combined with a blower door test to measure the total leakage to outside, measuring effective leakage to the outside of the house only.
- Finding air leaks in a building using an infrared camera while the house is depressurized. A blower door is not mandatory for an infrared reading, but the drawing in of outside air temperatures exaggerates temperature changes and facilitates the spotting of envelope leaks.

== NFPA enclosure integrity testing ==
NFPA enclosure integrity testing is a specialized type of enclosure testing that typically measures the airtightness of rooms within buildings that are protected by clean agent fire suppression systems. This test is normally done during the installation and commissioning of the system and is mandatory under NFPA, ISO, EN and FIA standards that also require the test is repeated annually if any doubt exists about the airtightness from the previous test. These types of enclosures are typically server rooms containing large amounts of computer and electronic hardware that would be damaged by the more typical water based sprinkler system. The word clean refers to the fact that after the suppression system discharges, there is nothing to be cleaned up; the agent merely disperses into the atmosphere.

NFPA-2001 (2015 Edition) is used throughout North America, many Asian countries and the Middle East. A hold time analysis has been required since 1985. ISO-14520-2015 version or EN-15004 Standards are used throughout Europe while FIA Standards are used in the UK. Results from all these standards are very similar.

NFPA standards for equipment calibration are about the same as they are for other types of testing, so any modern blower door equipment is sufficiently accurate to perform NFPA enclosure integrity testing. Specialized software or a tedious calculation must be provided to arrive at the hold time which is generally ten minutes.

The NFPA standard requires that the blower door operator be trained, but does not specify the nature or source of this training. There is no official NFPA training available for enclosure integrity testing methodology at this time.

An NFPA enclosure integrity test result is typically reported in the form of an agent hold time which represents the duration for which the room will retain at least 85% of the design concentration in order to suppress a fire and to ensure it does not reignite. This retention time inversely proportion to the leakage area of the room which is the major factor. Location of leaks, height being protected, the presence of continual mixing and clean agent being used will affect the hold time also. The 2008 Edition of NFPA-2001 required a peak pressure evaluation in addition but the industry in the USA in particular has been slow to institute this important requirement since excessive pressure during discharge has damaged many enclosures. This requirement was designed to prevent that.

== See also ==
- Energy audit
- Home performance
- Green retrofit
- Weatherization
- Efficient energy use
- Blower Doors In Popular Culture
