= Harold Orr =

Canadian mechanical engineer

- Occupation: Mechanical engineer
- Employer: National Research Council Canada (–1986); Oklahoma Christian University
- Works: Saskatchewan Conservation House
- Awards: Member of the Order of Canada (2017)

Harold Walter Orr CM (born April 30, 1931) is a Canadian mechanical engineer known for his work on energy-efficient construction and air leakage in houses, in particular the prioritization of energy demand reduction over active systems through the use of superinsulation and airtightness in passive design. Among Orr's major technical works are Design and construction of low energy houses in Saskatchewan (1982) and Energy efficient housing on the prairies (1982).

Orr worked with the Building Research Division of the National Research Council (NRC) of Canada. He focused on infiltration as a major component of heat loss. His research on air leakage in houses led to the development of the blower door, a tool still used today for tightness testing in houses. He also helped to develop the HotCan software, which continues to be used for whole house energy analysis and energy code compliance under the name HOT2000.

In response to the energy crisis of the 1970s, Orr proposed radical insulation and airtight construction techniques. He served as the lead engineer on the construction of the Saskatchewan Conservation House (SCH), the world's most airtight house at the time. The SCH influenced the development of energy efficiency building codes in Canada and internationally, and shaped the field of energy-efficient construction, including passive solar building design and the German Passive house. Orr's work has earned him many accolades, including a Pioneer Award at the International Passive House Conference in Leipzig, Germany in 2015, and being named a Member of the Order of Canada in 2017.

== Early life and education ==
Harold Walter Orr was born April 30, 1931 in Minton, Saskatchewan to Wilfred and Pearl Orr. Harold Orr's lineage traces back to William Brewster, a Pilgrim leader on the Mayflower, eleven generations prior, and John Williams Sr. and Jr., United Empire Loyalists, six generations prior.

Harold Orr's parents were founding members of what later became Western Christian College (WCC). His father worked at various times as a carpenter, builder, preacher, principal, and teacher. His mother's positions included assistant principal, matron, and teacher. When Harold was less than a year old, his parents moved into a 'cook car' and converted their home in Minton into a summer bible school, the predecessor of the Western Christian College.

That fall (1931), the Orrs moved back to Radville from the Peace River District in Alberta, hosting the next bible school in a meeting house. After living in British Columbia from 1936 to 1940, they once again returned to Radville. In 1940, they bought an 8-room house for $550 and donated it to the bible school. In 1944, they offered a site on their property on the east bank of the Long Creek a tributary of the Souris River for the establishment of a new school site. In 1945, the school was named the Radville Christian College. Harold and his siblings, Lois Olson (Orr), Alice Williams (Orr), Raymond Orr, P.Eng., and Verna Bastian (Orr), completed their high school educations there. Harold graduated in 1949.

Following his father and grandfather, Orr became familiar with building sites from the age of 12 and trained as a carpenter. After beginning to study mechanical engineering, he met and married Mary Ruth Lidbury in 1953. He eventually became a father to eight children: Ruth, Nancy, Walter, May, John, Randy, Robert, and Glenda, two of whom are adopted; to 22 Grandchildren and 28 Great Grandchildren. Over the years, he and his wife have fostered four children.

After working as a carpenter and briefly studying architecture, Orr returned to Saskatoon, where he completed his Bachelor of Engineering in mechanical engineering (1959) and Master of Science (1962) at the University of Saskatchewan. Orr was also the first president of the U of S Greystone Singers from 1958 to 1960, and designed its crest.

== Career ==
Orr's research career began with his Master's thesis, "Studies and Improvements to an Air Infiltration Instrument". As a master's student, Orr worked at the National Research Council (NRC) of Canada to investigate air leakage in houses. After graduating, Orr was hired by the NRC to continue his work on the problem of calculating air leakage in houses. As a student, he developed a method to measure air leakage using helium as a tracer gas, later improving this method by switching to sulphur hexafluoride. Orr/NRC-DBR independently developed the first practical and calibrated blower door system in 1977 while working on the Saskatchewan Conservation House project. To address the need for accurate measurement of air leakage, this system became a critical tool for achieving and verifying airtight construction. The blower door system developed by Orr and his colleagues became the industry standard and remains widely used today for air tightness testing in residential construction.

During the energy crisis of the 1970s, Orr served on a committee convened by the Saskatchewan Research Council (SRC) to design a passive solar house. As part of this committee, Orr applied his carpentry background and his knowledge of heat loss to suggest a radical increase in insulation and the use of airtight construction techniques. This project resulted in the Saskatchewan Conservation House (1977), which was the most airtight house in the world at the time. The Saskatchewan Conservation House (SCH) project faced challenges, including the inclusion of a government-mandated solar hot water system that proved to be expensive and inefficient. The solar component was removed after the house was sold to a private owner, after being used for two years as a model show house. Nonetheless, its conservation measures, such as insulation, airtightness, and its heat-recovery ventilation system, were highly effective. On a blower door test, a standardized measure of how rapidly air leaks out of a house at a pressure of 50 pascals (pa), most new Canadian houses of the time scored around 9 "air changes per hour" or ach @ 50 pa. The Saskatchewan Conservation House achieved measures of 0.5 ach@50pa. The Saskatchewan Conservation House became a model for low-energy house design, receiving as many as 1,000 visitors a week in 1978.

The elements used in the project paved the way for the development of the Natural Resources Canada R2000 program. They led to the establishment of new national energy conservation protocols, the Energuide Energy efficiency building codes, for use in Canadian buildings. Fourteen similar houses were constructed in Saskatoon in 1981, using principles from the SCH. The Saskatchewan Conservation House also became a model for the international Passive House (Passivhaus) building energy efficiency standard. The passive house approach became influential in Germany and Europe. In Saskatchewan, the first house to apply for official certification as a passive house was the Temperance Street Passive House, in 2016. It uses many of the principles Orr introduced in 1977.

In 1982, Orr and Dumont explored the potential for doing a deep-energy retrofit on an existing building. They applied ideas from the Saskatchewan Conservation House in the first "chainsaw retrofit". In preparation for creating a new building envelope for the house, the existing eaves and overhangs were removed at the roofline to simplify its surface. The entire house was then wrapped in a continuous polyethylene air-vapor barrier. The result was framed out and 8 inches of fiberglass insulation was added before a new facade was constructed. Blower tests of the house's air leakage showed a reduction of 90.1%, improving scores from 2.95 ach at 50 pa to 0.29 ach at 50 pa.

Orr also worked with Robert Dumont to develop the energy analysis program HotCan, which continues to be used as of 2018 under the name HOT2000. It is considered "a key component of Canada's home energy rating, labelling, incentive programs, and code compliance" for whole house energy analysis.

Orr retired from the NRC in 1986 after 25 years of service. From 1989 to 1992, Orr was a charter Engineering faculty member at Oklahoma Christian University. In 2017, Orr received both a Lifetime Achievement Award from the Saskatchewan Energy Management Task Force and the Order of Canada for his significant contributions to energy efficiency in Canadian homes. He was lauded for his ability to communicate technical issues to a broad audience throughout his career.

== Awards and recognition ==
Orr has received recognition for his contributions to energy-efficient construction and for his work in the community.

- In 1980, he was named Alumnus of the Year at Western Christian College.
- In 1989, he received a Professional Service Award from the EEBA as the first president of the Energy Efficient Buildings Association (EEBA).
- In 1999, Orr and his wife Mary Ruth Orr (née Lidbury) were awarded the Distinguished Service Award from the Western Canadian Christian Convention.
- In 2003, the Association of Engineers of Saskatchewan granted Orr life membership.
- In 2013, Orr received "The Golden Blower Door" from Passive House North.
- In 2013, he received a Lifetime Achievement Award from Sustainable Buildings Canada.
- In 2015, he accepted the Pioneer Award from the Passive House Institute for the team who worked on the SCH, an international award given to trailblazers in energy-efficient construction.
- In 2017, Orr was named a Member of the Order of Canada for his significant contributions to energy efficiency in Canadian homes.
- In 2017, Orr received The Rob Dumont Energy Management Awards "Lifetime Achievement Award".
- In 2018, he was recognized as an "EEBA Legend" by the same organization.
- In 2019, he received a Lifetime Achievement Award from the Canadian Home Builders' Association.
- In 2022, Orr received The Queen Elizabeth II Platinum Jubilee Medal.
- Passive House Canada has an annual award named after Orr meant to recognize an individual's contributions to increasing awareness of both passive house and net zero standards with government and business.

== Selected publications ==
Orr has contributed to the field of energy-efficient construction through numerous technical publications, including:

- Handegord, G. O.; Orr, H. W.; Nicholson, R. G. (August 1, 1964). "Temperature conditions in three houses following simulated power shut-off - NRC Publications Archive". nrc-publications.canada.ca. Government of Canada National Research Council.
- Orr, H. W. (April 1969). "A study of the effects of edge insulation and ambient temperatures on errors in guarded hot-plate measurements - NRC Publications Archive". nrc-publications.canada.ca. Government of Canada National Research Council.
- Shirtliffe, C. J.; Orr, H. W. (April 1, 1969). "Comparison of modes of operation for guarded hot plate apparatus with emphasis on transient characteristics - NRC Publications Archive". nrc-publications.canada.ca. Government of Canada National Research Council.
- Orr, H. W. (1974). "Condensation in electrically heated houses - NRC Publications Archive". nrc-publications.canada.ca. Government of Canada National Research Council.
- Hedlin, C. P.; Orr, H. W. (1977). "A study of the use of natural gas and electricity in Saskatchewan homes - NRC Publications Archive". nrc-publications.canada.ca. Government of Canada National Research Council.
- Kumar, R.; Ireson, A. D.; Orr, H.W. (1979). "An automated air infiltration measuring system using SF[6] tracer gas in constant concentration and decay methods - NRC Publications Archive". nrc-publications.canada.ca. Government of Canada National Research Council.
- Dumont, R. S.; Orr, H. W.; Hedlin, C. P.; Makohon, J. T. (1980). "Measured energy consumption of a group of low-energy houses - NRC Publications Archive". nrc-publications.canada.ca. Government of Canada National Research Council.
- Hedlin, C. P.; Orr, H. W.; Tao, S. S. (1980). "A method for determining the thermal resistances of experimental flat roof systems using heat flow meters - NRC Publications Archive". nrc-publications.canada.ca. Government of Canada National Research Council.
- Orr, H. W.; Figley, D. A. (March 1980). "An exhaust fan apparatus for assessing the air leakage characteristics of houses - NRC Publications Archive". nrc-publications.canada.ca. Government of Canada National Research Council.
- Dumont, R. S.; Orr, H. W. (September 1981). "Cost of energy conservation measures for new housing - NRC Publications Archive". nrc-publications.canada.ca. Government of Canada National Research Council.
- Dumont, R. S.; Orr, H. W.; Figley, D. A. (November 1981). "Air tightness measurements of detached houses in the Saskatoon area - NRC Publications Archive". nrc-publications.canada.ca. Government of Canada National Research Council.
- Orr, H. W. (1982). "Energy efficient housing on the prairies - NRC Publications Archive". nrc-publications.canada.ca. Government of Canada National Research Council.
- Orr, H. W. (April 1, 1982). "Design and construction of low energy houses in Saskatchewan - NRC Publications Archive". nrc-publications.canada.ca. Government of Canada National Research Council.
- Dumont, R. S.; Lux, M. E.; Orr, H.W. (September 1, 1982). "HOTCAN: A Computer Program for Estimating the Space Heating Requirement of Residences - NRC Publications Archive". nrc-publications.canada.ca. Government of Canada National Research Council.
- Dumont, R. S.; Orr, H. W.; Lux, M. E. (December 1, 1982). "Low energy Prairie housing : a survey of some essential features - NRC Publications Archive". nrc-publications.canada.ca. Government of Canada National Research Council.
- Dumont, R. S.; Orr, H. W.; Hedlin, C. P. (1983). "Low-energy houses: measured energy-consumption figures - NRC Publications Archive". nrc-publications.canada.ca. Government of Canada National Research Council.
- Orr, H. W.; Dumont, R. S. (May 1, 1987). "A major energy conservation retrofit of a bungalow - NRC Publications Archive". nrc-publications.canada.ca. Government of Canada National Research Council.
