= Pook (surname) =

Pook is a surname, and may refer to:

- David Pook (born 1955), English former professional footballer
- Edmund Walter Pook (born 1851), Englishman accused of the Eltham Murder
- Jocelyn Pook (born 1960), English composer and viola player
- John Pook (born 1942), Welsh poet
- Michael Pook (born 1985), English footballer
- Peter Pook (1918-1978), British author
- Robert Pook (born 1967), English cricketer
- Samuel Moore Pook (1804–1878), American naval architect (father of Samuel H. Pook)
- Samuel Hartt Pook (1827–1901), American naval architect (son of Samuel M. Pook)
- Tom Pook (1869–1948), Wales international rugby player

== See also ==
- Pook (disambiguation)
