= Pooky =

Pooky or Pookie may refer to:

Fictional characters

- Pooky (Garfield character), the teddy bear belonging to Garfield in the comic strip and cartoon
- Pooky, a large, snake-like creature in Stephen King's 2012 novel The Dark Tower: The Wind Through the Keyhole
- Angela Montenegro, real name Pookie Noodlin, in the TV series Bones
- Pookie the Lion, a hand puppet on the Soupy Sales television show
- Pookie, in the movie New Jack City
- Pookie, Arnold's grandmother in Hey Arnold!, a Nickelodeon animated television series
- Pookie, a rabbit with wings in a series of children's books by Ivy Wallace
- Pookie Jones, in the comic strip Popeye

Other uses:

- Mr. Pookie, rapper
- Pookie (vehicle), a Rhodesian mine-detecting vehicle
- Pookie (song), 2019 song by Aya Nakamura
- Pooky Quesnel (born 1964), English actress, screenwriter and singer
- Pookie (film), a 2026 Indian Tamil-language romantic comedy
- The Sterile Cuckoo, a 1969 film released in the UK as Pookie
- Pooky, in the documentary TV series Meerkat Manor - see List of Meerkat Manor meerkats
- Pooky, an open source project on SourceForge building multi-touch software
- Pookie, a brand name for a mastic based duct sealant (UL 181 A-M or 181 B-M rated) Ductwork airtightness#Duct sealing or duct tightening

== See also ==
- Pooky Night, an alternate name for Halloween in some parts of Ireland

Translated form:

- The term Pooky or Pookie in other languages written as puki or pukie can refer to "Vagina" or "Vulva". This comes from Filipino language and culture, and is considered offensive in several Southeast Asian countries.

Modern form:

- Pooky is also a pet name (for example, "I love you, pooky") or a term used to call someone 'cute'. It is a common phrase used in Gen Z.
