= Ductwork airtightness =

Ductwork airtightness can be defined as the resistance to inward or outward air leakage through the ductwork envelope (or ductwork shell). This air leakage is driven by differential pressures across the ductwork envelope due to the combined effects of stack and fan operation (in case of a mechanical ventilation system).

For a given HVAC system, the term ductwork refers to the set of ducts and fittings (tees, reducers, bends, etc.) that are used to supply the air to or extract the air from the conditioned spaces. It does not include components such as air handlers, heat recovery units, air terminal devices, coils. However, attenuators, dampers, access panels, etc. are a part of the ductwork even if they have more functions than conveying the air and are therefore also referred to as technical ductwork products.

Ductwork airtightness is the fundamental ductwork property that impacts the uncontrolled leakage of air through duct leaks.

== Metrics ==
There are two major systems to classify ductwork airtightness, one based on European standards, the other based on ASHRAE standard 90.1-2010. Both are based on the leakage airflow rate at a given ductwork pressure divided by the product of the ductwork surface area and the same ductwork pressure raised to the power 0.65.

- In Europe,
  - Airtightness classes of ductwork components/fittings are defined in European Standard EN 12237 for circular ductworks, EN 1507 for rectangular ductworks and EN 17192 for non-metallic ductworks. Airtightness of components ranges from class A to D, with class A being the leakiest one. EN 1751 and EN 15727 specify the leakage requirements for technical ductwork components and are based on the same leakage classification. Airtightness classes for air handling units (L1 to L3) are defined in EN 1886.
  - Airtightness classes for ductwork systems are defined in EN 16798-3:2017. In 2017, EN 16798-3 introduced new names for ductwork airtightness classes; ductwork systems now range from classes ATC 7 to ATC 1. The Table that follows provides the correspondence (equivalence) between airtightness classes A to D and the new names ATC 7 to ATC 1. The leakage test method for system commissioning is described in EN 12599.
- In the US, leakage classes 48, 24, 12, 6, 3 as defined by ASHRAE are commonly used; ASHRAE also gives recommended acceptance criteria based air leakage as a percentage of fan design airflow at maximum operating conditions.

Classification of air distribution tightness
Airtightness classes	Airtightness classes	Air leakage limit (fmax) according to the test pressure (p_{t}) [m^{3}.s^{−1}.m^{−2}]
Previous name	New name	
	ATC 7	Not classified
	ATC 6	0,0675 × p_{t}^{0,65} × 10^{−3}
A	ATC 5	0,027 × p_{t}^{0,65} × 10^{−3}
B	ATC 4	0,009 × p_{t}^{0,65} × 10^{−3}
C	ATC 3	0,003 × p_{t}^{0,65} × 10^{−3}
D	ATC 2	0,001 × p_{t}^{0,65} × 10^{−3}
	ATC 1	0,00033 × p_{t}^{0,65} × 10^{−3}

In future revisions of EN 12237, EN 1507, EN 1751 and EN 15727 these new names will be used; they have already been introduced in EN 17192.

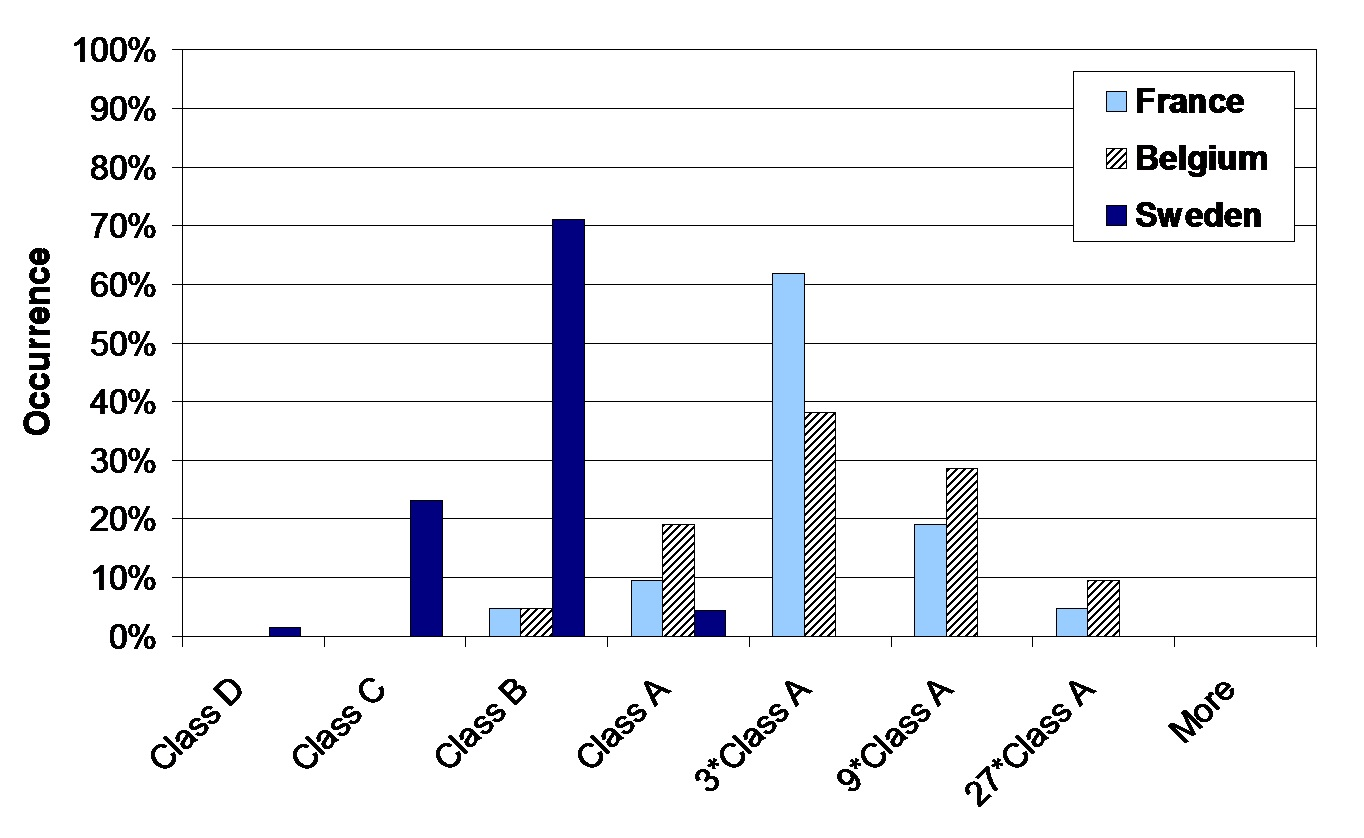
Distribution of ductwork airtightness classes. Number of measurements: 21 in Belgium, 21 in France, 69 in Sweden

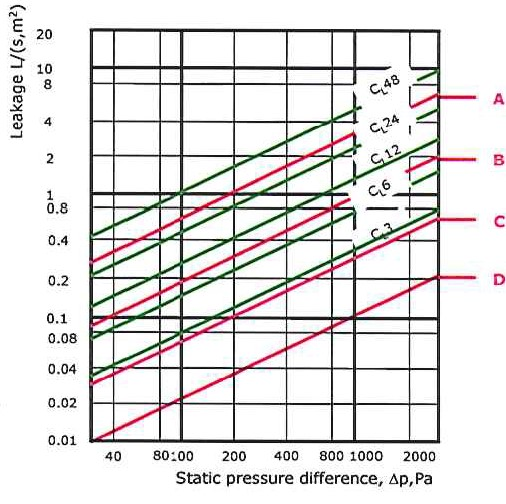
Comparison between European (Eurovent and AMA) TightVent Classes A-D and American (ASHRAE) TightVent classes CL3, CL6, etc.

== Power law model of airflow through leaks ==
The relationship between pressure and leakage air flow rate is defined by the power law model between the airflow rate and the pressure difference across the ductwork envelope as follows:

q_{L}=C_{L}∆p^{n}

where:

- q_{L} is the volumetric leakage airflow rate expressed in L.s^{−1}
- C_{L} is the air leakage coefficient expressed in L.s^{−1}.Pa^{−n}
- ∆p is the pressure difference across the ductwork envelope expressed in Pa
- n is the airflow exponent (0.5 ≤ n ≤ 1)

This law enables to assess the airflow rate at any pressure difference regardless the initial measurement. Threshold limits in ductwork airtightness classifications usually assume an airflow exponent of 0,65.

== Pressurization test ==
The ductwork airtightness level is the airflow rate through ductwork leakages divided by the ductwork area. It is recommended to test at least 10% and 10 m^{2} of the duct surface including all duct types and a variety of sizes and components. The ductwork surface area is estimated according to EN 14239.

The airflow rate through leakage can be measured by temporarily connecting a device (sometimes called a duct leakage tester to pressurize the ductwork including duct-mounted components. Air flow through the pressurizing device creates an internal, uniform, static pressure within the ductwork. The aim of this type of measurement is to relate the pressure differential across the ductwork to the air flow rate required to produce it. Generally, the higher the air flow rate required to produce a given pressure difference, the less airtight the ductwork. This pressurization technique is described in standard test methods such as EN 12599 and ASHRAE standard 90.1-2010. In principle, it is similar to that used to characterize building airtightness.

== Impact of ductwork airtightness ==
An airtight ductwork has several positive impacts:

- secured air transport through the duct system;
- lower energy bills due to less heat loss and fan energy wastage to compensate the effect of the leaks;
- lower leakage airflow rates to/from unconditioned spaces (which can affect energy use, power demand, indoor air quality and comfort);
- easier airflow balancing;
- lower duct leakage noise.

Duct leakage affects more severely the energy efficiency of systems that include air heating or cooling.

== Duct sealing or duct tightening ==
At construction stage, the airtightness of individual components depends on the design (rectangular or round ducts, pressed or segmented bends, etc.) and assembly (seam type and welding quality). Components with factory-fitted sealing devices (e.g., gaskets, clips) meant to ease and accelerate the installation process are widely used in Scandinavian countries. A variety of techniques are widely used to tighten duct systems on site, including gaskets, tapes, sealing compound (mastic), internal duct lining, aerosol duct sealing. So-called "duct tapes" are often not suited for sealing ducts, which explains why, in the US, the International Energy Conservation Code (IECC) requires any tape used on duct board or flexible ducts to be labeled in accordance with UL 181A or 181B.

Typical reasons for poor ductwork air tightness include:

- inadequate or missing sealing media;
- worn tapes;
- poor workmanship around duct take-offs and fittings;
- ill-fitted components;
- physical damage.

== Ductwork airtightness requirements ==
Sweden is often considered as a reference for airtight ducts: the requirements introduced in AMA (General material and workmanship specifications) starting in 1950 have led to excellent ductwork airtightness on a regular basis in Sweden.

In the US, there has been a significant amount of work showing energy saving potentials on the order of 20-30% in homes; and 10-40% in commercial buildings with airtight ducts

The ASIEPI project technical report on building and ductwork air tightness estimated the heating energy impact of duct leakage in a ventilation system on the order of 0-5 kWh per m^{2} of floor area per year plus additional fan energy use for a moderately cold European region (2500 degree-days).
