= Duct leakage testing =

Diagnostic tool

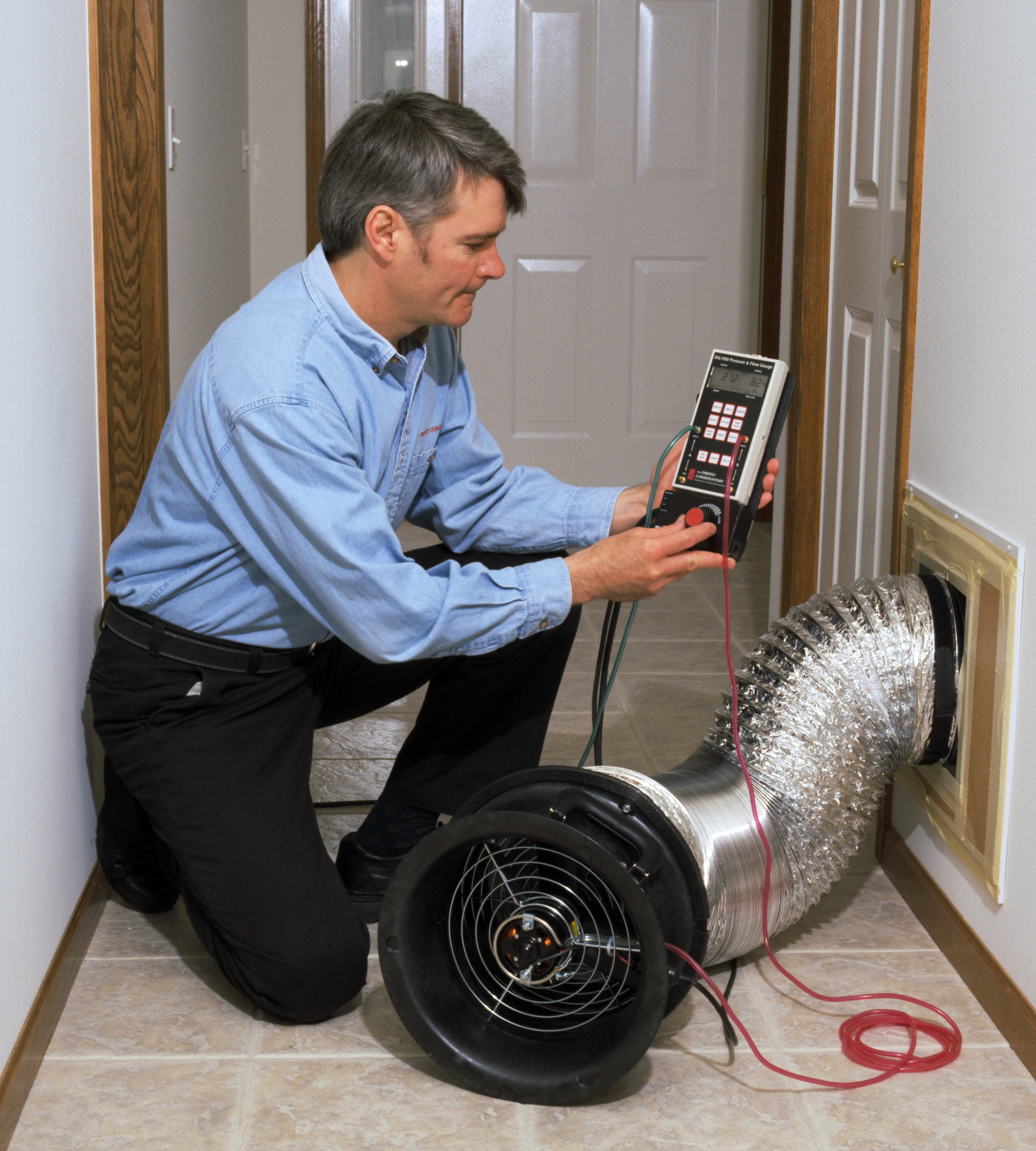
Duct leakage test in the US

A duct leakage tester is a diagnostic tool designed to measure the airtightness of forced air heating, ventilating and air-conditioning (HVAC) ductwork. A duct leakage tester consists of a calibrated fan for measuring an air flow rate and a pressure sensing device to measure the pressure created by the fan flow. The combination of pressure and fan flow measurements are used to determine the ductwork airtightness. The airtightness of ductwork is useful knowledge when trying to improve energy conservation.

== Uses ==
Duct leakage testers are used in residential single family, residential multi-family, and commercial buildings that have a forced air delivery systems for heating and cooling.

== Operation ==
A basic duct leakage testing system includes three components: a calibrated fan, a register sealing system, and a device to measure fan flow and building pressure. Supply registers or return air grills are sealed using adhesive tapes, cardboard, or non-adhesive reusable seals. One register or return is left unsealed, and the calibrated fan is connected to it. Pressure is monitored in one of the branches of the ductwork while the calibrated fan delivers air into the system. As air is delivered into the ductwork, pressure builds and forces air out of all of the openings in the various ductwork connections or through the seams and joints of the furnace or air-conditioner. The tighter the ductwork system (e.g. fewer holes), the less air is needed from the fan to create a change in the ductwork pressure.

A duct leakage test can be performed by either pressurizing or depressurizing the ductwork. Ductwork that is outside the building envelope, such as in an unconditioned attic or crawlspace, should be pressurized so as to not bring in unwanted contaminants such as dust.

== Measurements ==
Duct tester airtightness measurements are presented in a number of different formats including but not limited to:

=== Air flow (CFM) ===
CFM25 is defined as the air flow (in cubic feet per minute) needed to create a 25 Pascal pressure change in the ductwork. CFM25 is one of the most basic measurements of ductwork airtightness. A pressure of 25 Pa is equal to 0.1 inches (0.25 cm) of water column.

=== Leakage area ===
Leakage area estimates are a useful way to visualize the equivalent cumulative size of all leaks or holes in the ductwork. There are a variety of standard calculation methods used to estimate leakage areas.

=== Ratings ===
Commercial and industrial ductwork is often tested to standards developed by the Sheet Metal and Air Conditioning Contractors' National Association (SMACNA). Ductwork is temporarily subjected to higher pressures, and then given a rating or classification rather than a leakage estimate.

== Additional methods ==
=== Leakage to outside ===
The above test procedure describes how to determine total duct leakage, or how much leakage there is for all of the ductwork connected to the HVAC system. Another test is for duct leakage to the outside. Depending on the location of the house in the United States, some HVAC systems are completely inside the thermal envelope, some are completely outside the thermal envelope, and some are a combination of the two. Energy conservation is improved mostly by sealing ductwork that is outside the thermal envelope or connected to the outside. With mixed systems, it is possible to determine amount of leakage to the outside by simultaneously pressurizing the house while pressurizing the ductwork, and measuring the amount of flow that is required to equalize the pressure.

=== Blower door subtraction ===
Another form of duct leakage to outside uses a blower door to measure the total amount of leakage of the house, then seal off all registers and returns and to measure the leakage again. The next step requires measuring the pressure in the taped off duct system with respect to the building. The blower door manual will include a correction table to determine a correction factor based on the pressure in the duct work. To calculate the duct leakage to outside, subtract the leakage with the registers sealed from the total building leakage and multiply by the correction factor.

=== Pressure pan test ===
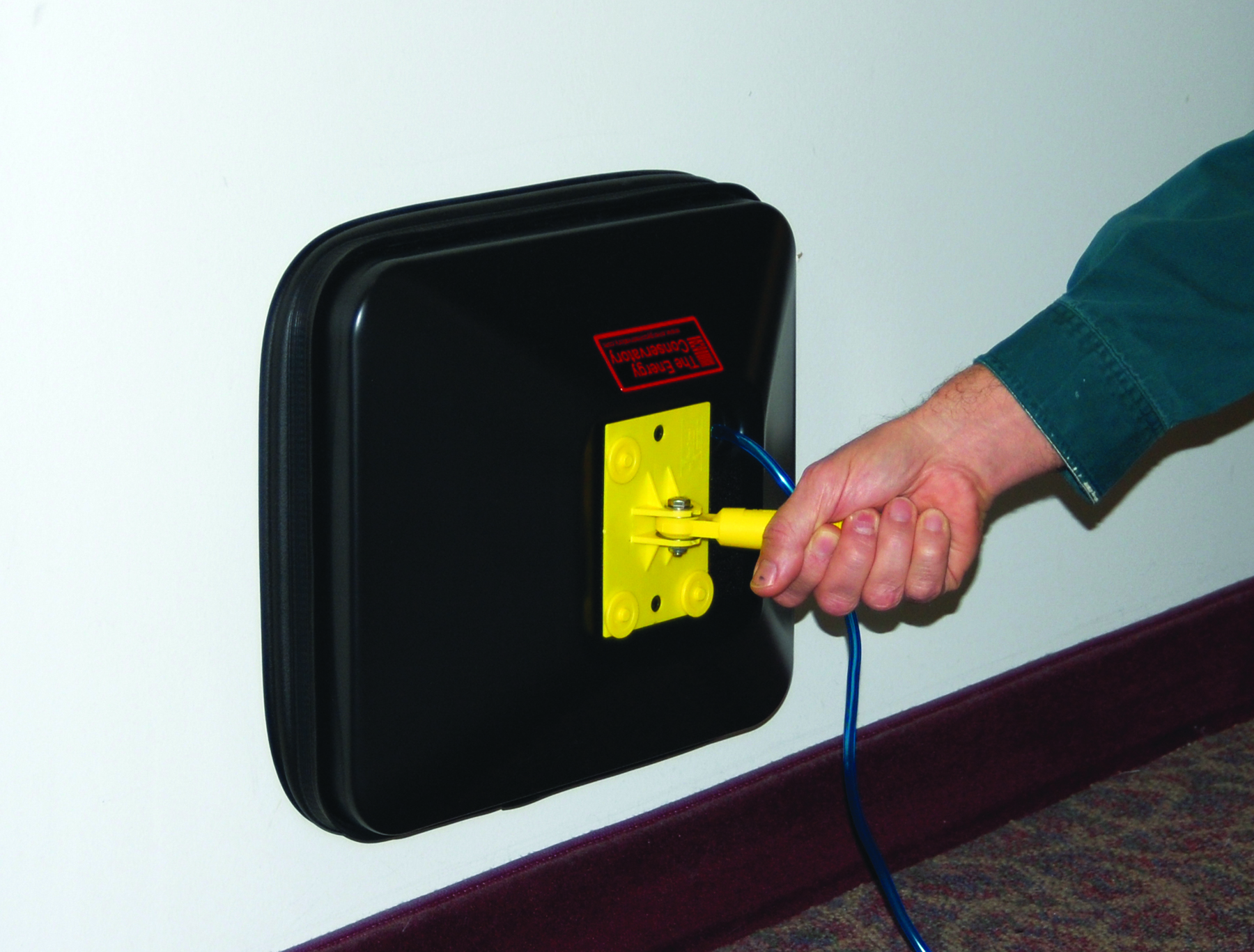
Small pressure pan application

A third test method to determine if ductwork is leaking to the outside is to use a pressure pan, which is a register cover with a pressure tap for a hose connection. With the house pressurized (or depressurized) to 50 Pa (-50 Pa) using a blower door, a pressure gauge is attached to the pressure pan by means of a hose. If the pressure difference is near zero, this indicates that the ductwork associated with that particular register is not connected to the outside. A pressure 5 Pa or above indicates that the duct work is connected to or leaking to the outside. A smaller pressure difference indicates greater leakage. This method does not quantify duct leakage, but serves to identify locations of ductwork runs that are leaking to the outside. It is more of a qualitative measure, used for fault isolation.
