= Saskatchewan Research Council =

Canadian provincial crown corporation

- Company type: Crown Corporation
- Industry: Research
- Founded: 1947
- Headquarters: Saskatoon, Regina & Prince Albert, Saskatchewan, Canada
- Key people: Mike Crabtree, Chief Executive Officer (April 1, 2019-)
- Products: Research
- Number of employees: 251-500
- Website: www.src.sk.ca

The Saskatchewan Research Council (SRC) is a provincial treasury board crown corporation engaged in research and technology development on behalf of the provincial government and private industry. It focuses on applied research and development projects that generate profit. Some of its funding comes from government grants, but it generates the balance from selling products and services. With nearly 300 employees and $137 million in annual revenues, SRC is the second largest research and technology organization in Canada.

== History ==
The Province of Saskatchewan established SRC in 1947. SRC carried out its work through grants-in-aid to specific applied research activities at the University of Saskatchewan. Saskatchewan Research Council's first Director of Research was Thorbergur Thorvaldson, head of the university's chemistry department.

In 1954, SRC expanded its mandate to incorporate independent research. Under Warren's direction, SRC opened its own laboratories in 1958 and then expanded in 1963. In 1986 the research and development branch of SaskOil was transferred to SRC.

== Research ==
SRC's research history includes developing a residential energy conservation research report that was used in the National Building Code of Canada. In the late 1970s, the SRC was contracted to design and build a passive solar house that was suitable for Canadian prairie conditions. The project, which hired Harold Orr from the National Research Council, resulted in the construction of the Saskatchewan Conservation House in Regina in 1977. The project featured innovations such as the blower door test, air-to-air heat exchange, and an airtight construction that became influential in low-energy building design. The house has been cited as an inspiration for the passive house building standard.

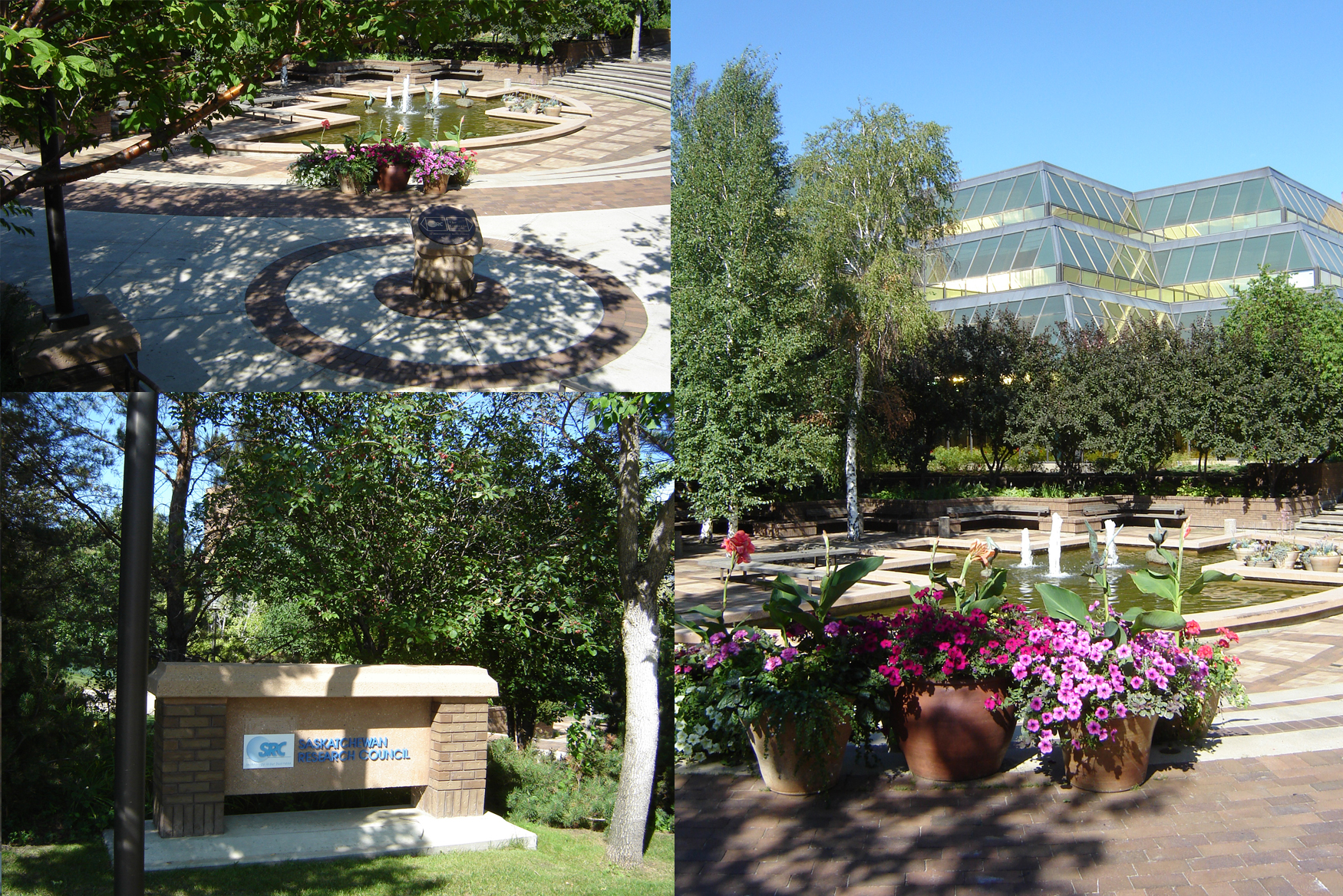
SRC facility in Saskatoon

SRC mapped the groundwater resources in Saskatchewan south of the Precambrian Shield. Its scientists evaluated Saskatchewan's extensive lignite (coal) resources. SRC's GenServe Laboratories were involved in testing for bovine spongiform encephalopathy (Mad Cow disease). SRC is also known for building the Factor 9 home, which uses 90 per cent less energy and 50 per cent less water than a similar home built during the 1970s. In the past they housed a SLOWPOKE-II nuclear research reactor (that had 16 kW thermal power) that performed analytical tests. SRC's SLOWPOKE-2 reactor operated from 1981 until being shut down in December 2017. Decommissioning was expected to be completed sometime in 2020. In the early 2000s, SRC developed a suite of dual-fuel hydrogen vehicles that led to the launch of Saskatchewan's first hydrogen fuelling station in 2010

Current research is conducted in a range of laboratories and test facilities. SRC's Environmental Analytical Laboratories provide environmental monitoring and other tests to clients. Its Geoanalytical Laboratory provides geochemical analyses for the mineral exploration industry. Other labs include Petroleum Analytical Laboratories, a Biofuels Test Centre, a Pipe Flow Technology Centre, and a diamond testing facility.

SRC is contracted by the Government of Saskatchewan to manage the thirty-seven abandoned uranium mine and mill sites near Lake Athabasca through Project CLEANS.

In 2017, SRC launched the Centre for the Demonstration of Emissions Reduction (CeDER), a test and verification facility to help industry manage and reduce its GHG emissions.

In 2020, SRC was awarded $31 million in funding for a first-of-its-kind Rare Earth Processing Facility in Saskatchewan.

== See also ==
- Innovation Place Research Park
- University of Saskatchewan academics
