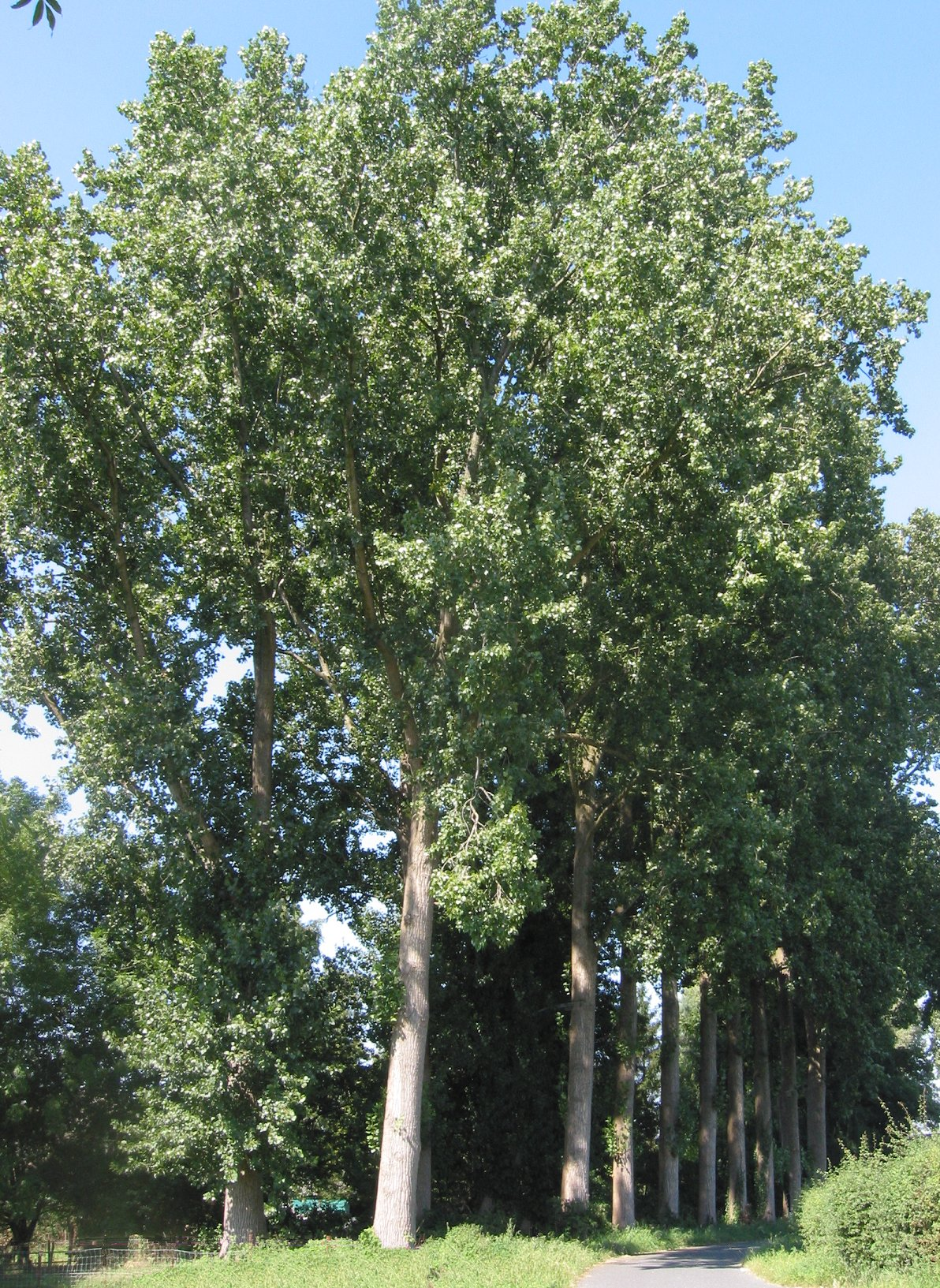

Scientific classification
- Kingdom: Plantae
- Clade: Tracheophytes
- Clade: Angiosperms
- Clade: Eudicots
- Clade: Rosids
- Order: Malpighiales
- Family: Salicaceae
- Genus: Populus
- Section: Populus sect. Aigeiros
- Species: P. × canadensis

Binomial name
- Populus × canadensis Moench

Synonyms
- List: Monilistus × monilifera Raf.; Populus balsamifera var. canadensis (Moench) Sudw.; Populus × brabantica (Houtz.) Houtz.; Populus × canadensis f. aurea Rehder; Populus × canadensis var. gelrica (Houtz.) Geerinck; Populus × canadensis f. marilandica (Bosc ex Poir.) Geerinck; Populus × canadensis var. marilandica (Rehder) Rehder; Populus × canadensis var. regenerata (A.Henry) Rehder; Populus × canadensis var. robusta (Simon-Louis ex Schelle) Hyl.; Populus × canadensis var. serotina (Hartig) Rehder; Populus × caroliniana McMinn & Maino; Populus × euramericana (Dode) Guinier; Populus × gelrica Houtz.; Populus × robusta (Simon-Louis ex Schelle) C.K.Schneid.; Populus × serotina Hartig; Populus × serotina var. aurea A.Henry

= Populus × canadensis =

Hybrid species of tree

Populus × canadensis, known as the hybrid black poplar, Canadian poplar or Carolina poplar, is an artificial hybrid between Populus nigra from Europe and Populus deltoides from North America, which arose when the two parent species were first brought together in cultivation in France soon after 1700. It is a vigorous, broadly columnar, deciduous tree growing to 40–45 m (131–148 ft), which is commonly used in plantation forestry and by landscape architects. The tallest reliably measured, near the Weltenburg Abbey in Kelheim, Germany, is 47 metres tall, and the stoutest, in Baak in the Netherlands, is 8.5 metres girth.

== Description ==
It is intermediate between its parents in characters, with leaves deltoid (triangular) but with a less broad base than P. deltoides and often somewhat acute at the base, as in P. nigra; the leaves are 8–14 cm long and 8–11 cm wide. As with all poplars, it is dioecious, with separate male and female trees; the sex of an individual is often an important clue to identifying which cultivar it is. The pollen catkins are red, the seed catkins green, and opening when mature to shed their small seeds embedded in cotton-like fluff.

=== Cultivars ===
Numerous cultivars have been selected, mostly for forestry use; the most significant listed below in order of naming:

- 'Serotina' 1750, France. From Latin, "late", named from its late leaf bud opening, not until late May or June; the first produced, it is very vigorous, and easily recognised by its slanting trunk and few, large branches. Male. To 42 m tall.
- 'Marilandica' 1800. An early clone, now rarely found. Female. To 40 m tall.
- 'Regenerata' (railway poplar) 1814, France. From Latin, "regenerating", as it pollards well; the English name from being much planted along railway lines in England in the 20th century. Leafs out a month earlier than 'Serotina', but similar in crown shape. Female. To 40 m tall.
- 'Eugenei' 1832, Metz, France. One parent was Populus nigra 'Italica' (Lombardy poplar), and it inherits a narrow crown from this, though much less obvious than its parent. Male.
- 'Serotina Aurea' (syn. 'Aurea'; golden poplar) 1871, Belgium. From Latin, "gold", referring to the yellowish foliage. Slower-growing, and only reaching around 30 m. It has won the Royal Horticultural Society's Award of Garden Merit.
- 'Robusta' 1895, France. From Latin, "robust, fast-growing". A much straighter tree than 'Serotina', growing vertical, and with more numerous but smaller and more regular branching and narrow-crowned; very vigorous when young (2–2.5 m per year). Important in forestry. Male.
- 'Gelrica' c.1900, Netherlands. Male. Particularly vigorous in trunk diameter growth; the stoutest known specimen is this cultivar.

== Ecology ==
Hybrid black poplar is very susceptible to attack by mistletoe (Viscum album), to which its European parent P. nigra is highly resistant; heavy mistletoe infestation on a poplar is a reliable indicator that the poplar is P. × canadensis and not P. nigra.

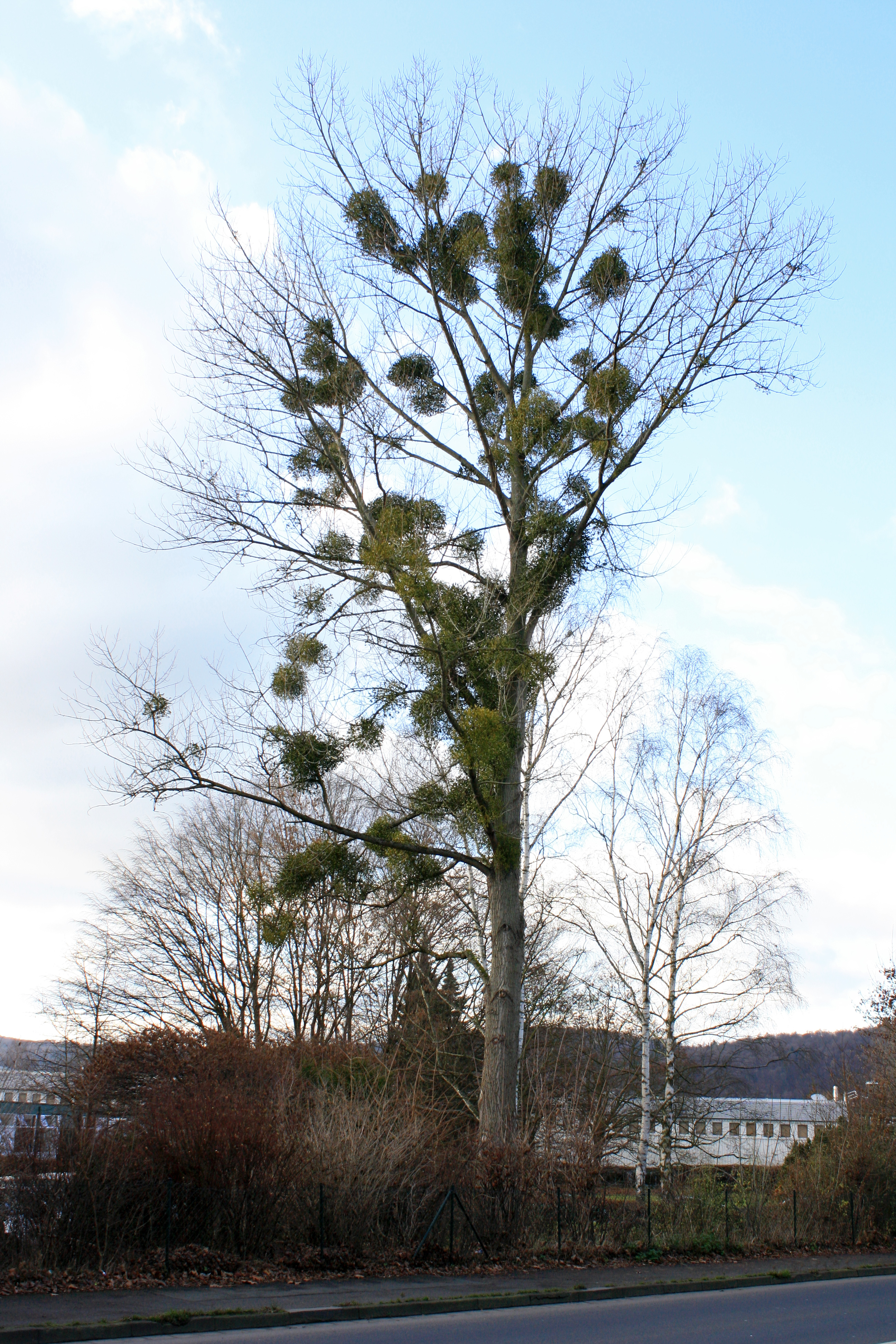
Hybrid black poplar in winter with heavy mistletoe infestation. Marburg, Germany.
