= Bronckhorst =

- Municipality
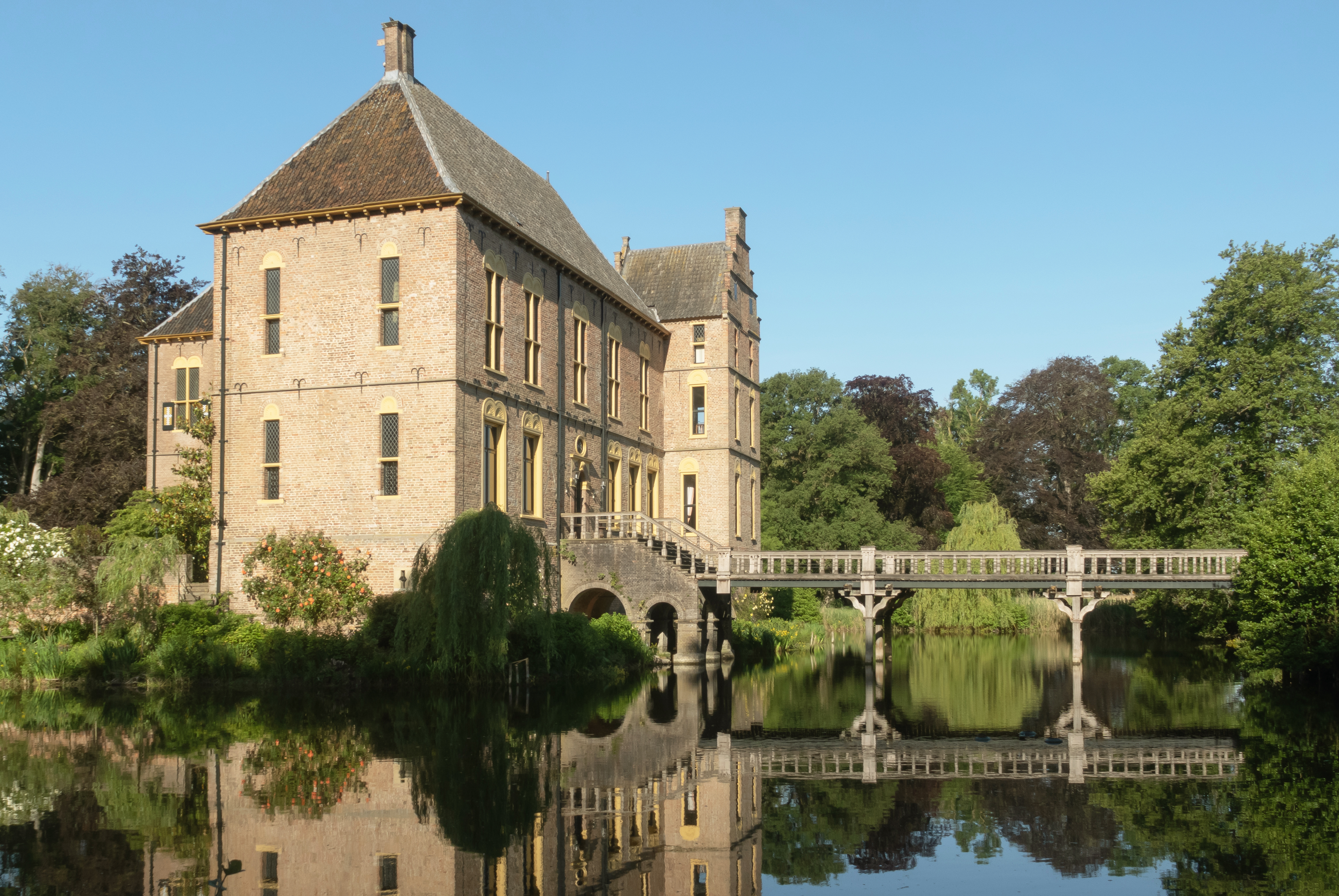
- Vorden Castle

- Flag Coat of arms

- Location in Gelderland
- Coordinates: 52°3′N 6°18′E
- Country: Netherlands
- Province: Gelderland
- Established: 1 January 2005

Government
  - Body: Municipal council
  - Mayor: Patrick van Domburg (VVD)

Area
  - Total: 286.42 km^{2} (110.59 sq mi)
  - Land: 283.50 km^{2} (109.46 sq mi)
  - Water: 2.92 km^{2} (1.13 sq mi)
- Elevation: 13 m (43 ft)
- Highest elevation: 43 m (141 ft)

Population (January 2021)
  - Total: 36,087
  - Density: 127/km^{2} (330/sq mi)
- Time zone: UTC+1 (CET)
  - Summer (DST): UTC+2 (CEST)
- Postcode: Parts of 6900, 7000 and 7200 ranges
- Area code: 0313, 0314, 0575
- Website: www.bronckhorst.nl

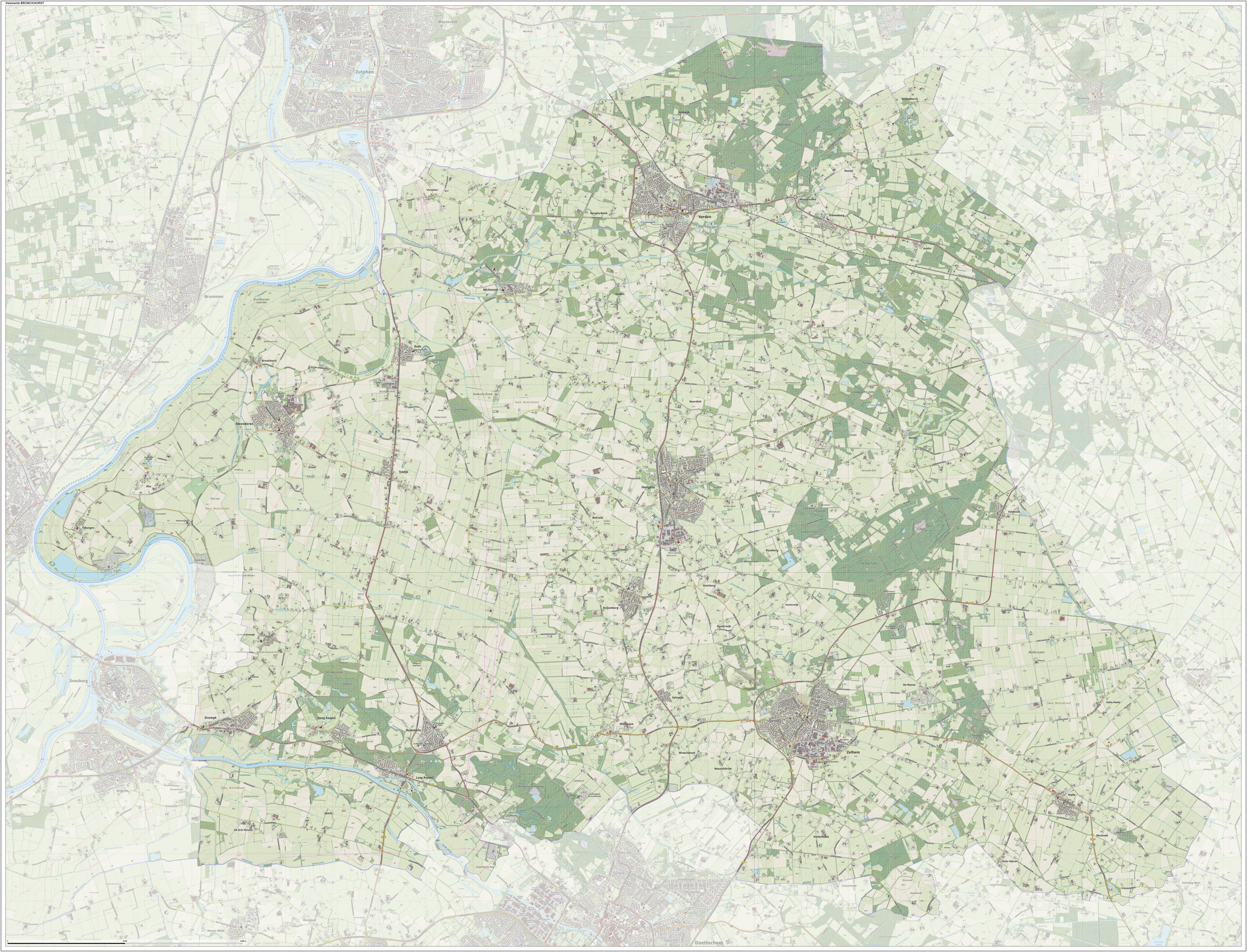
Map of Bronckhorst, June 2015

Bronckhorst (pronounced [ˈbrɔŋkɦɔrst]) is a municipality in Gelderland, the Netherlands. The municipality is the result of a merger of the former municipalities Hengelo, Hummelo en Keppel, Steenderen, Vorden and Zelhem, on 1 January 2005. The municipality is named after the medieval castle of the Bronckhorst family, who once ruled the area.

The seat of the municipality is Hengelo.

== Population centres ==
Formerly in Hengelo:

- Hengelo
- Keijenborg
- Noordink
- Dunsborg
- Bekveld
- Gooi
- Varssel
- Veldhoek

Formerly in Hummelo en Keppel:

- Achter-Drempt
- Eldrik
- Hoog-Keppel
- Hummelo
- Laag-Keppel
- Voor-Drempt

Formerly in Vorden:

- Delden
- Kranenburg
- Linde
- Medler
- Mossel
- Veldwijk
- Vierakker
- Vorden
- Wichmond
- Wildenborch

Formerly in Zelhem:

- De Meene
- Halle
- Halle-Heide
- Halle-Nijman
- Heidenhoek
- Heurne
- Oosterwijk
- Velswijk
- Wassinkbrink
- Winkelshoek
- Wittebrink
- Zelhem

Formerly in Steenderen:

- Baak
- Bronkhorst
- Olburgen
- Rha
- Steenderen
- Toldijk

=== Keppel ===
Keppel received city rights in 1404.

== Gallery ==
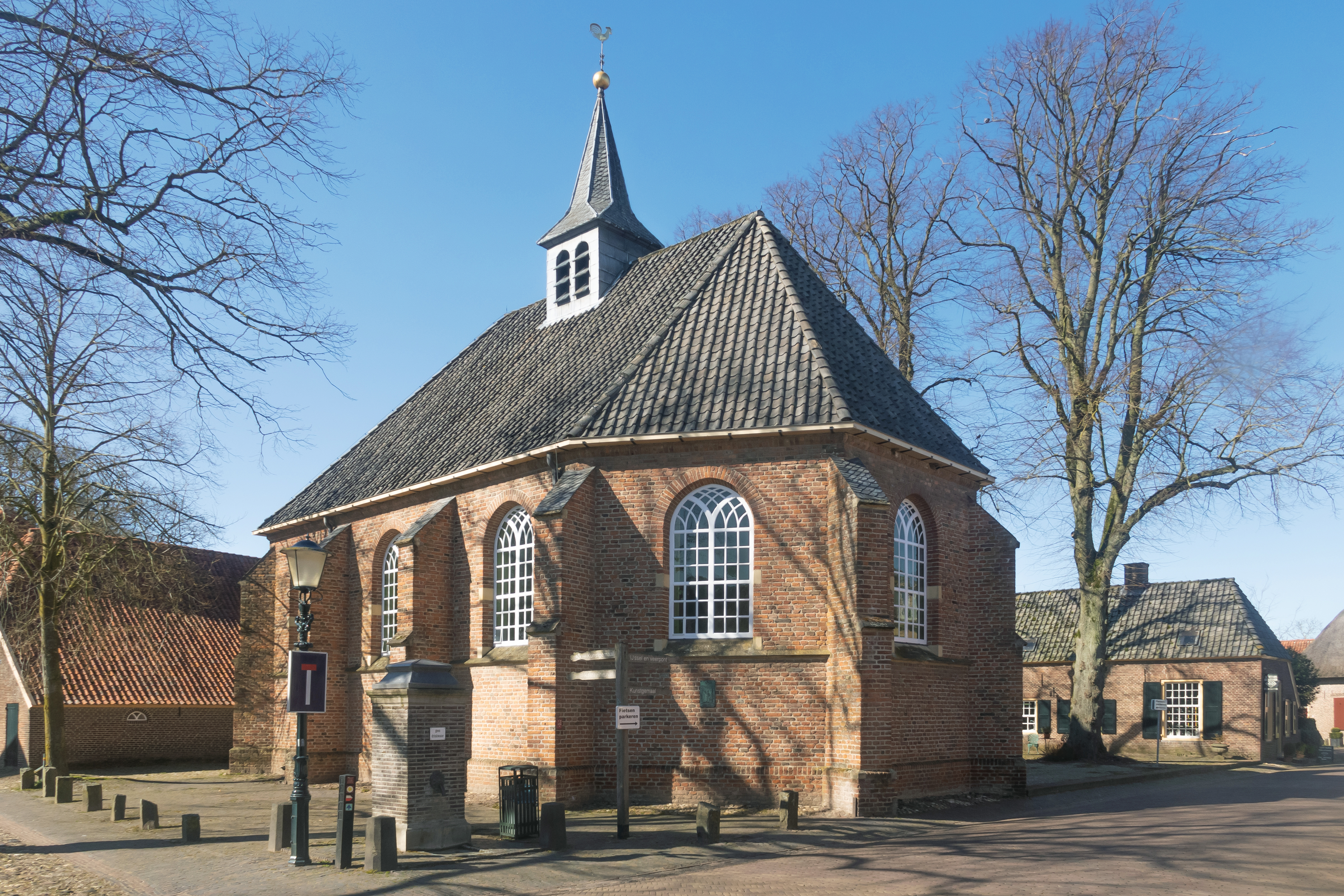
Bronkhorst, chapel

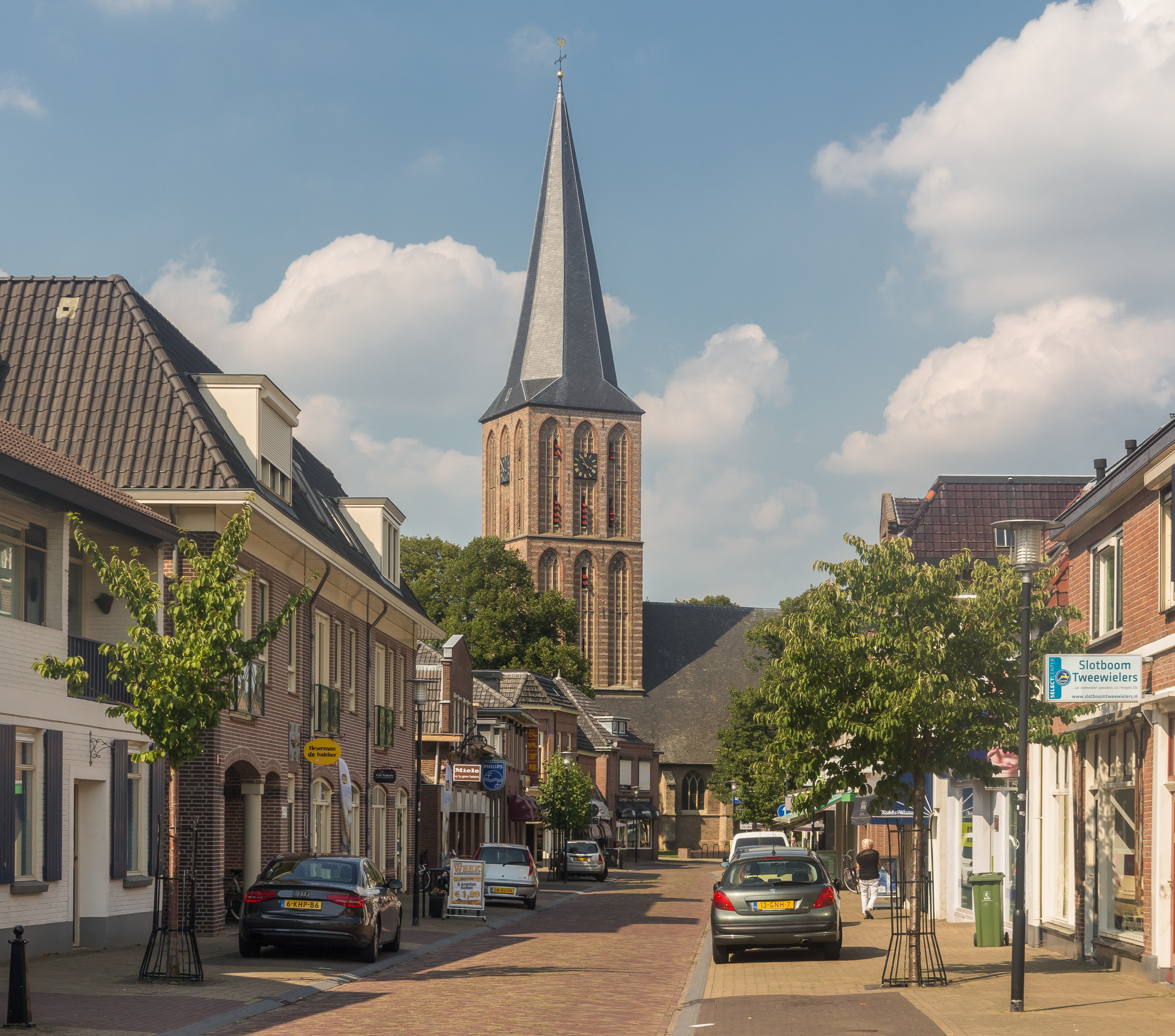
Hengelo, church (de Remigiuskerk)

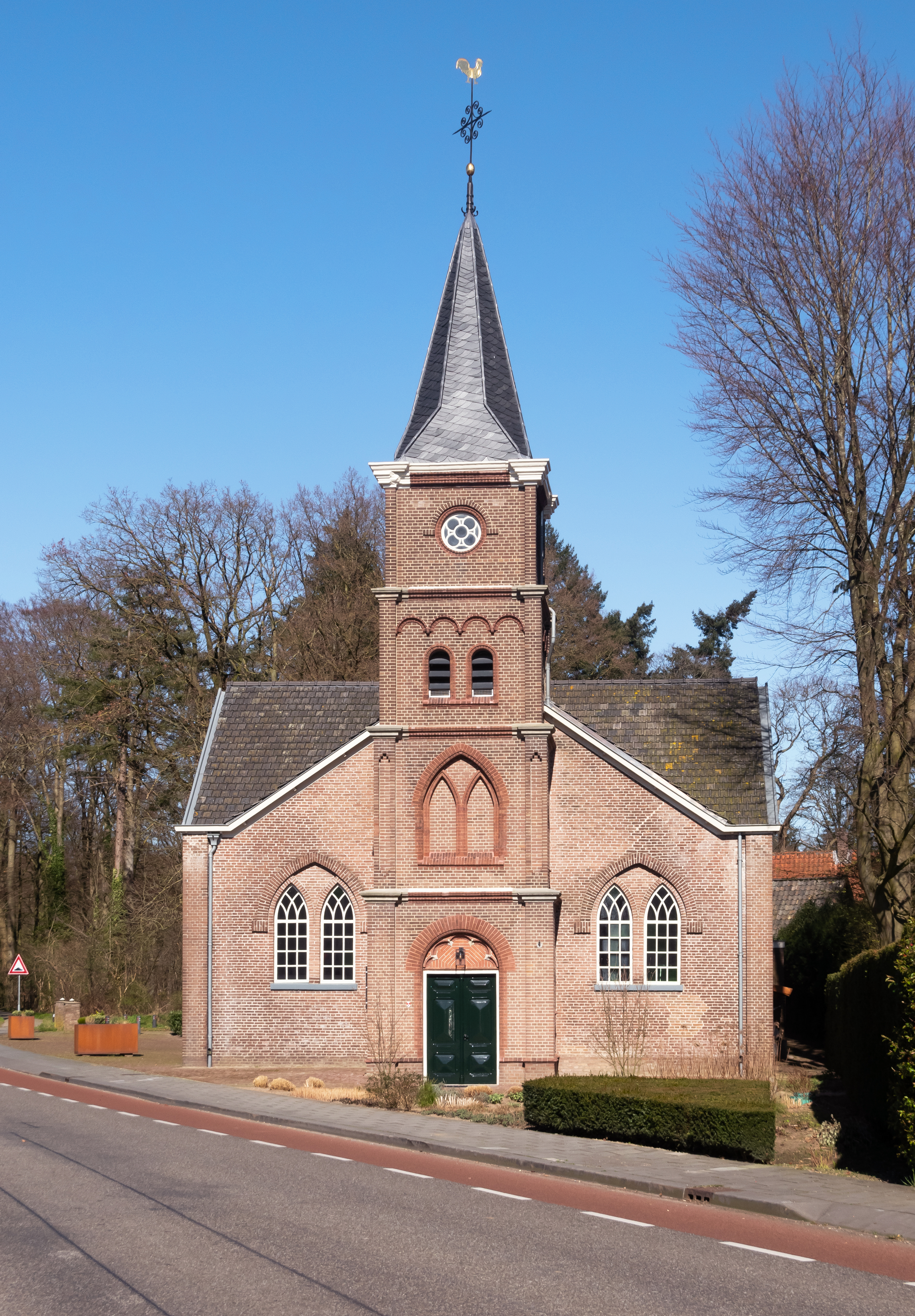
Laag Keppel, Reformed Church

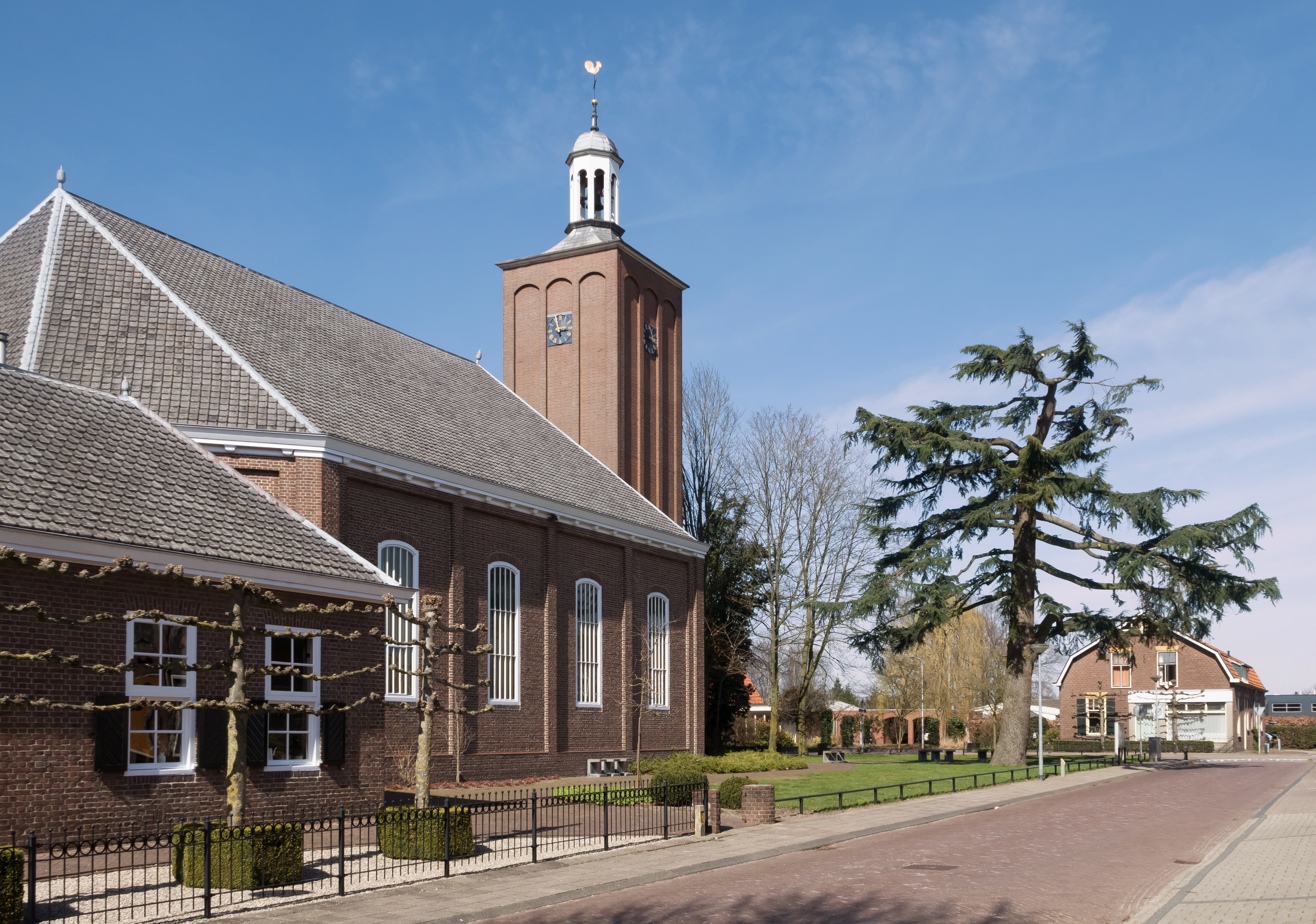
Halle, Reformed Church

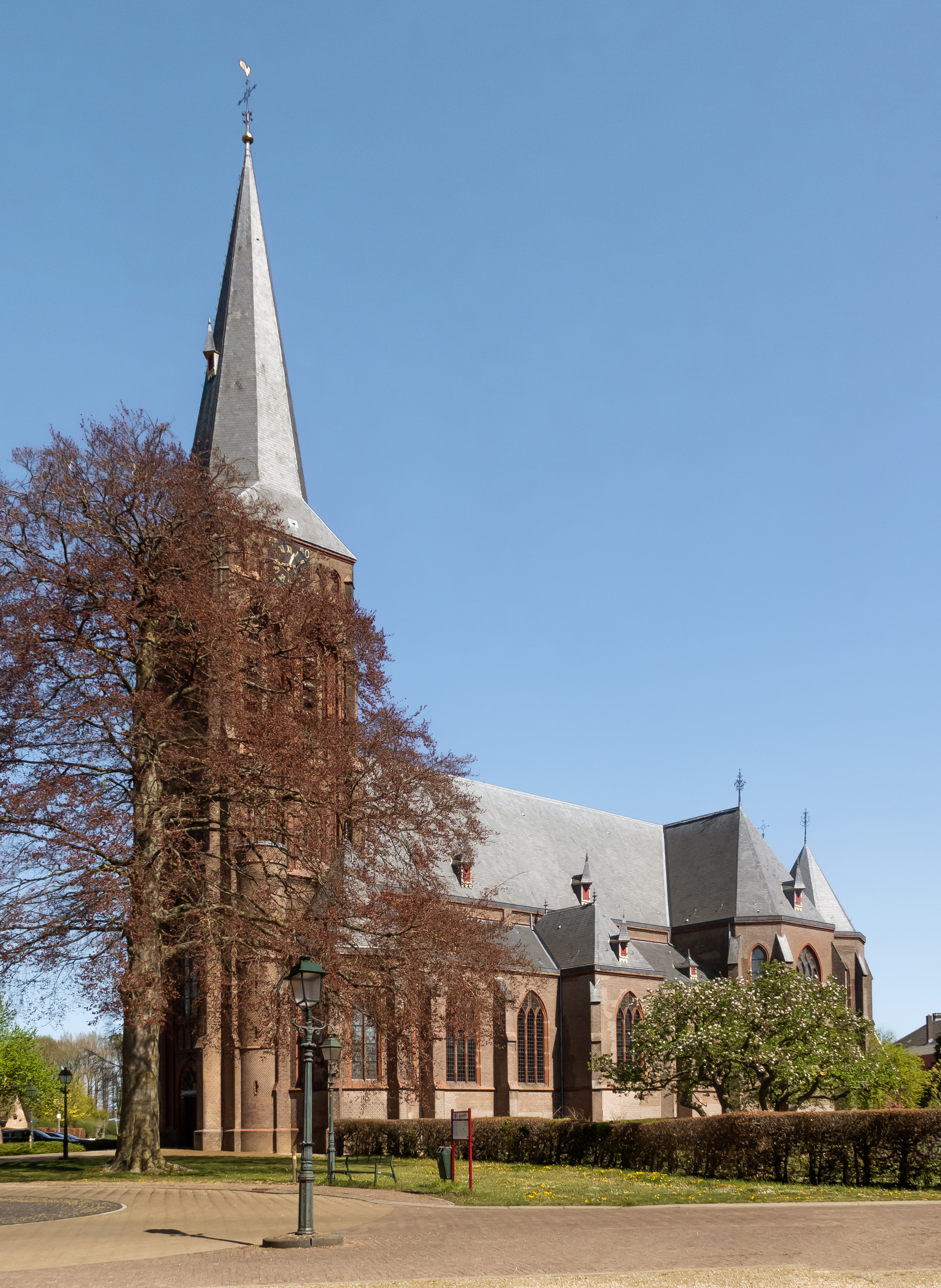
Baak church: Sint-Martinuskerk

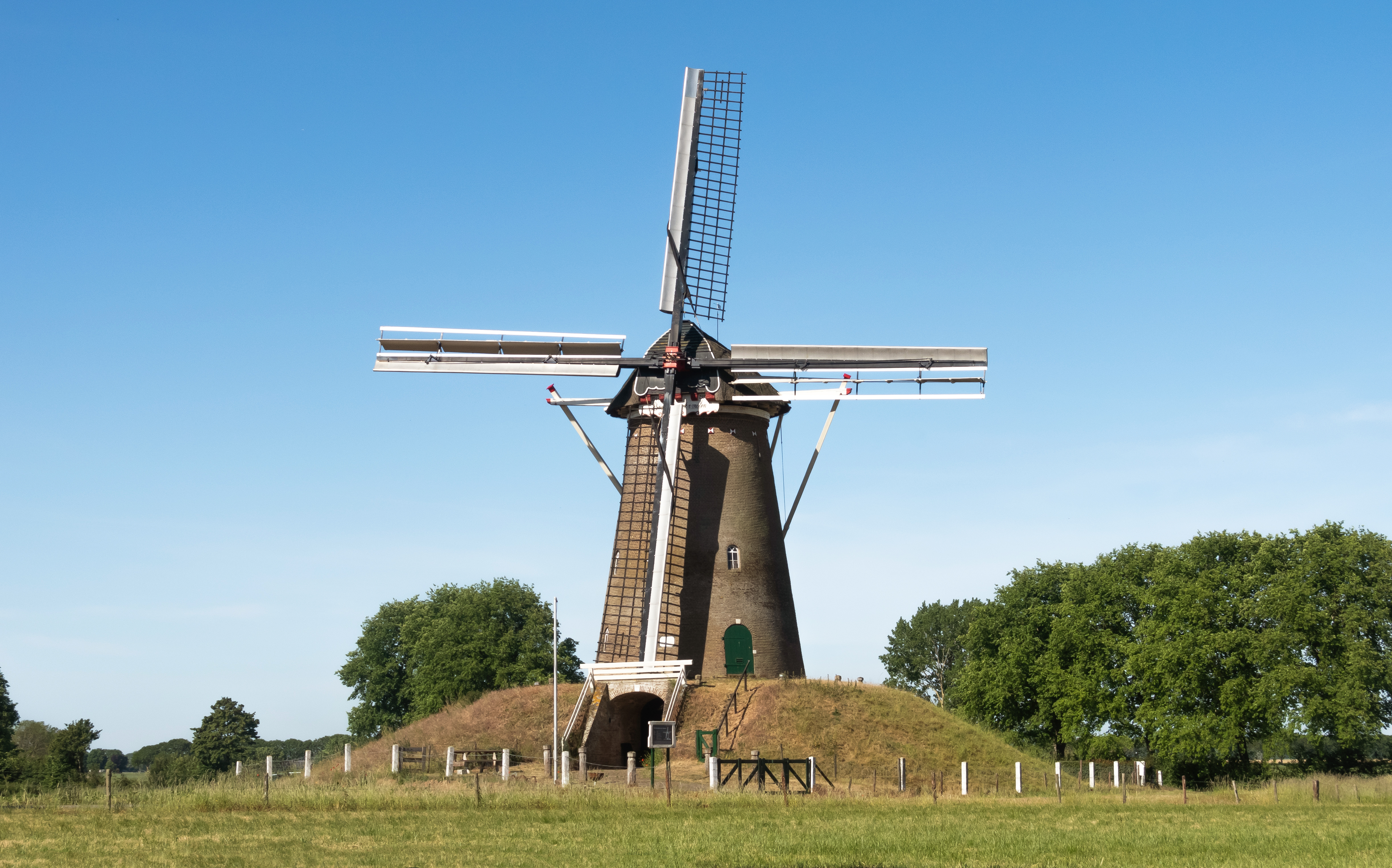
Steenderen, windmill: de Bronkhorster Molen

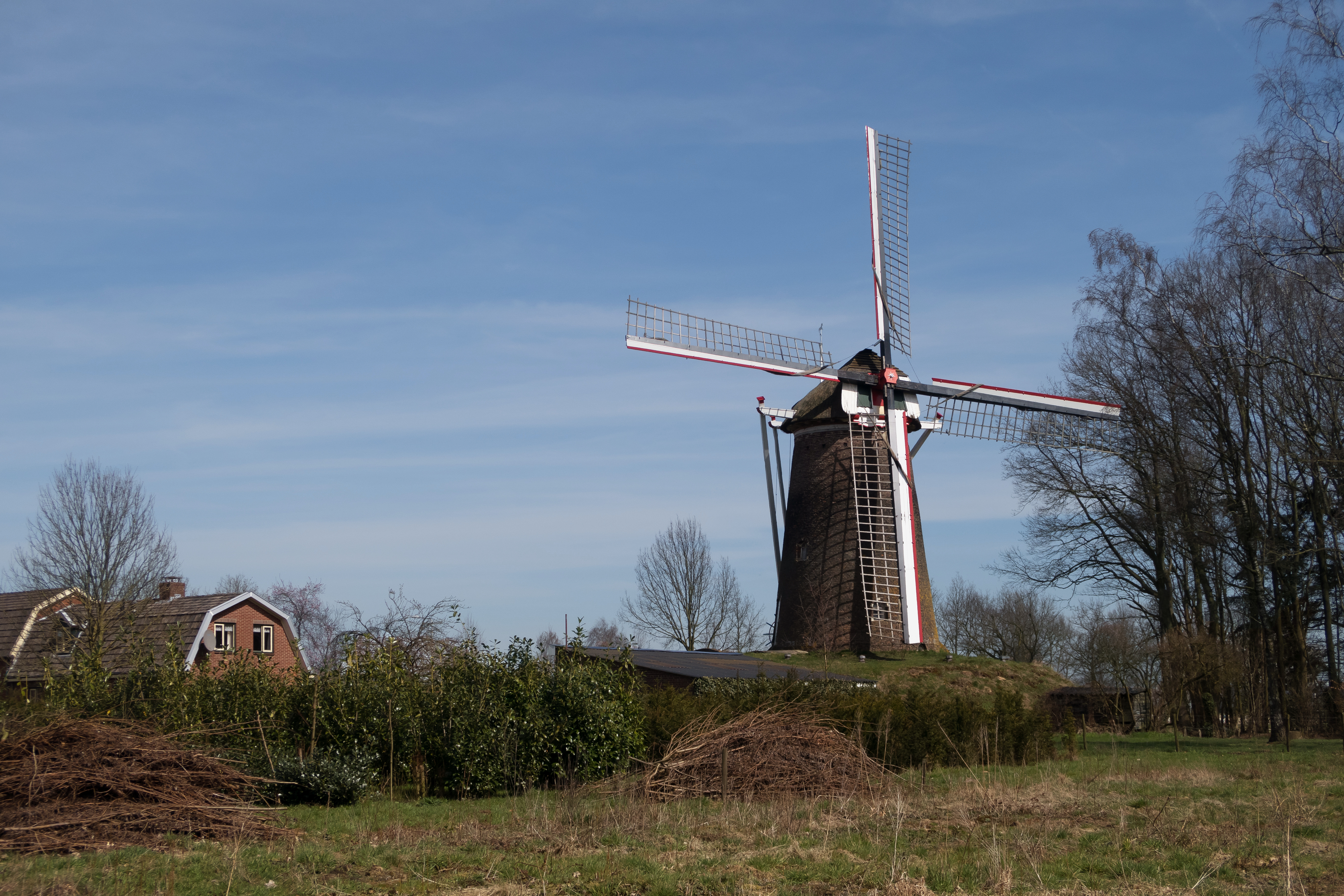
Wittebrink, windmill: de Wittebrinkse Molen

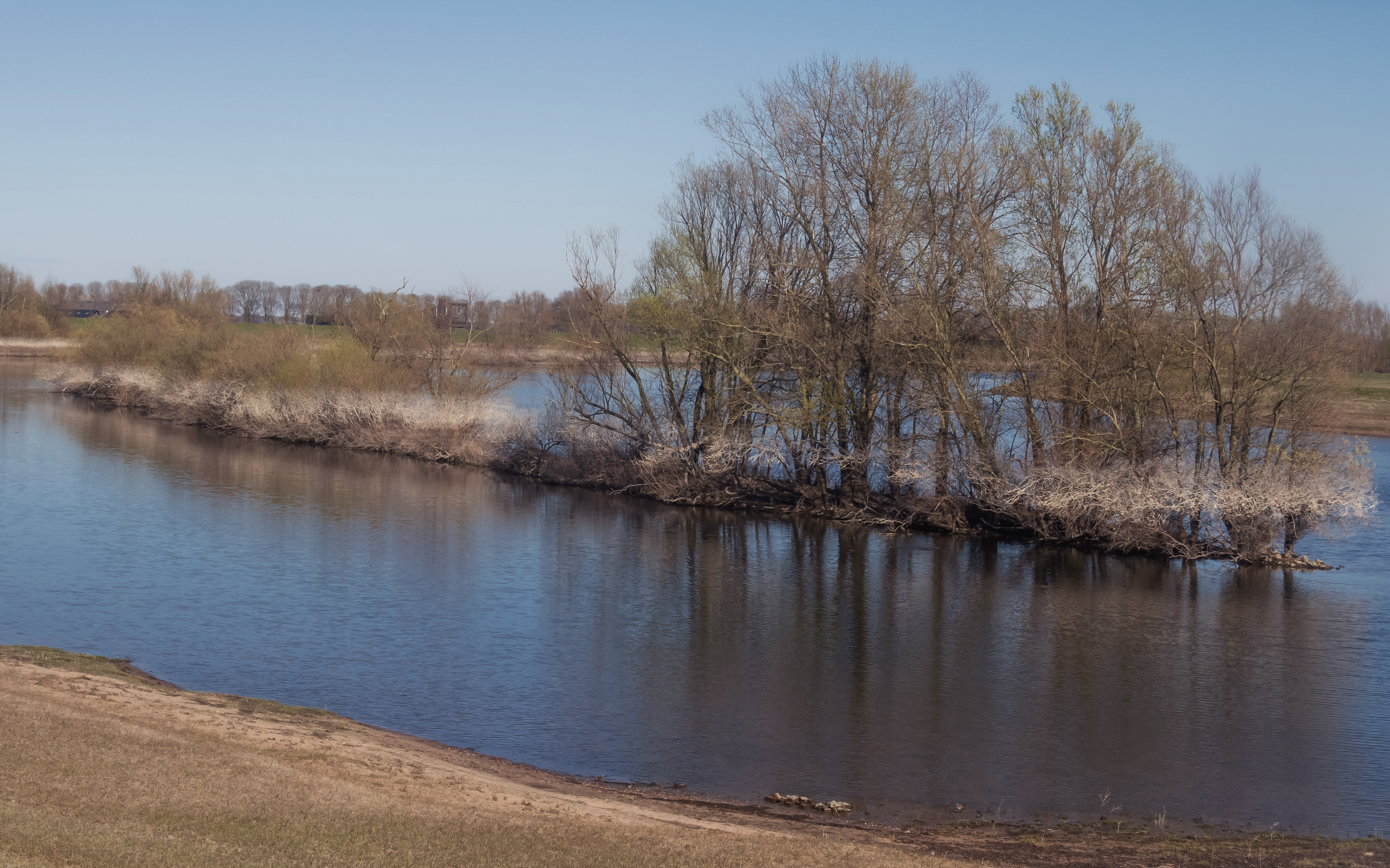
The Zwarte Schaar, between Olburgen and Doesburg

== Notable people ==
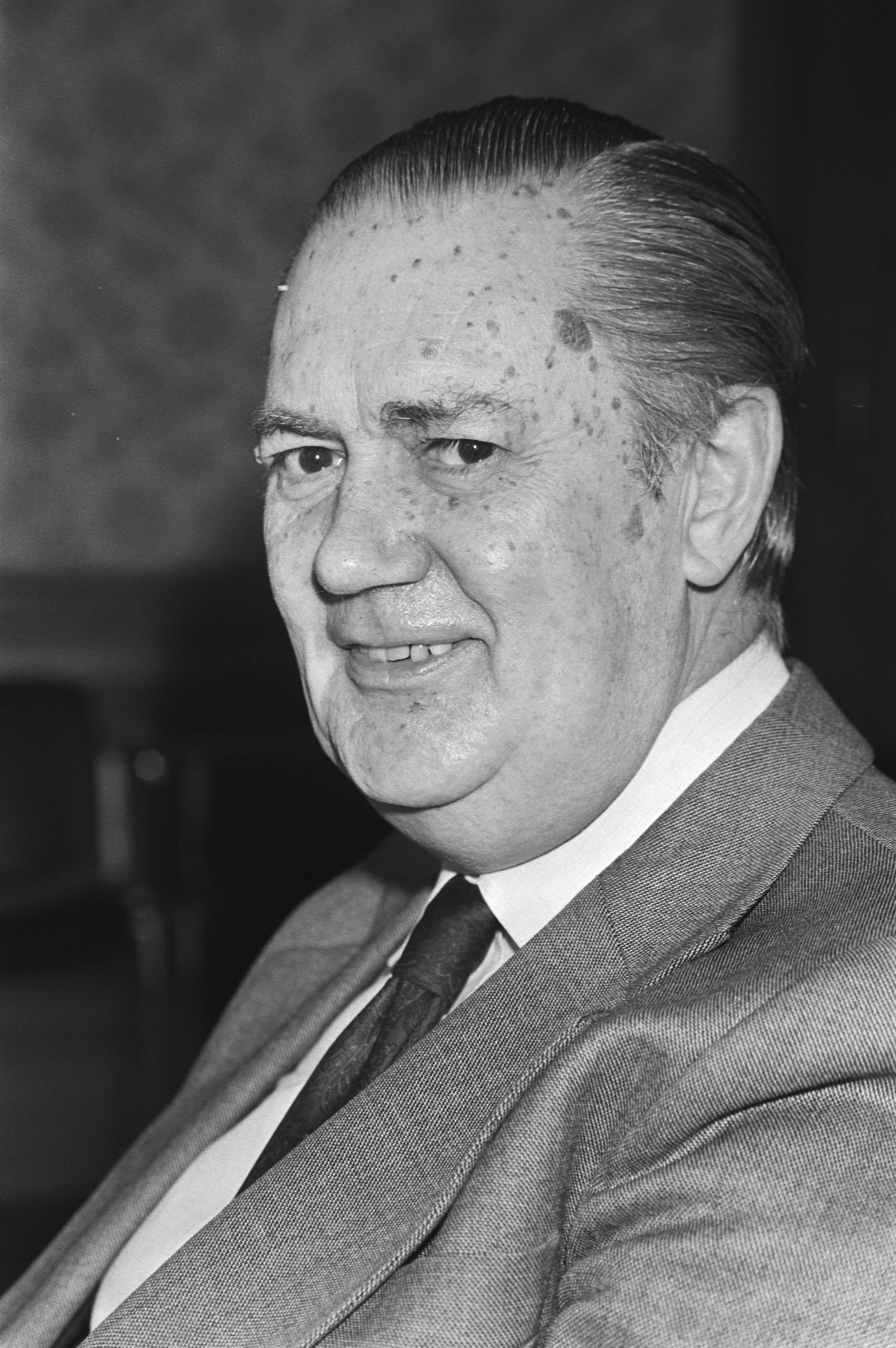
Henk Zeevalking, 1981

- Henrica Iliohan (1850 in Vorden – 1921) a Dutch-born American woman suffragist
- Henk Zeevalking (1922 in Laag-Keppel – 2005) a Dutch politician and co-founder of the Democrats 66 (D66)
- Prof Jan Remmelink (1922 in Zelhem – 2003) was Attorney General of the High Council of the Netherlands 1968/1989
- Annemarie Jorritsma (born 1950 in Hengelo) a Dutch politician

=== Sport ===
- Leo Klein Gebbink (born 1968 in Zelhem) a former field hockey midfield player
- Klaas-Jan Huntelaar (born 1983 in Voor-Drempt) a Dutch professional footballer with over 450 club caps
