= Drempt =

- Village
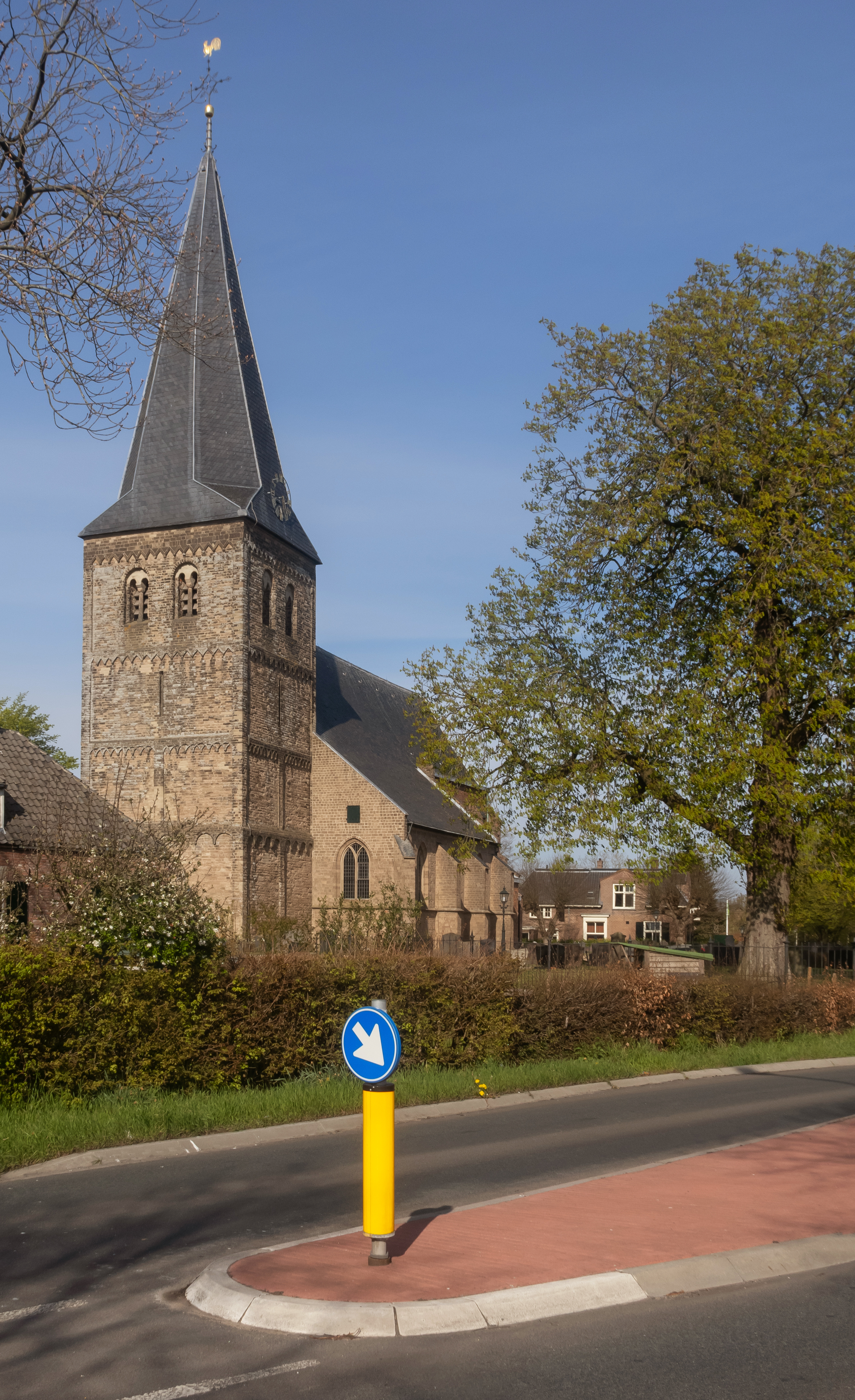
- Dutch Reformed church

- Location in the province of Gelderland Location in the Netherlands
- Coordinates: 52.0076°N 6.1708°E
- Country: Netherlands
- Province: Gelderland
- Municipality: Bronckhorst

Area
  - Total: 0.63 km^{2} (0.24 sq mi)
- Elevation: 12 m (39 ft)

Population (2021)
  - Total: 1,230
  - Density: 2,000/km^{2} (5,100/sq mi)
- Time zone: UTC+1 (CET)
  - Summer (DST): UTC+2 (CEST)
- Postal code: 6996
- Dialing code: 0313

Drempt is a village in the Dutch province of Gelderland. It is located in the municipality of Bronckhorst. It used to consist of two villages, Achter-Drempt (behind) and Voor-Drempt (in front), which have merged. Drempt is located about 9 kilometres (5.6 mi) north-west of Doetinchem.

== History ==
Voor-Drempt was first mentioned in 1122 as "Rutheradus de Thremete", and means "end piece (of land)". Voor-Drempt developed on a river dune, and was located along the Oude IJssel until the 11th century. Achter-Drempt developed in the 19th century to the north of Voor-Drempt, and is a Catholic area unlike Voor-Drempt which is Protestant.

The Dutch Reformed church is a three aisled basilica-like church. The tower dates of the 12th century. The church is a result of 15th and 16th century modifications. It was enlarged and plastered in 1868. The church was damaged during World War II, and restored between 1955 and 1959. During the restoration, the plaster was removed.

The Catholic St Willibrordus Church is located in Achter-Drempt, and was built between 1935 and 1936 in Delftse School style (a form of Traditionalism), and is the replacement of a predecessor from 1859.

The farm Witte Hemel dates from the early-19th century, however it is located on a small terp (artificial living mound) and was inhabited between 3,000 and 500 BC. The current name is a corruption from the German Weidliche Heimal, and was a sacred place which was used as a court of law. The farm is used a studio and art gallery.

Both villages were home to 1,092 people in 1840. In 1978, the two villages were twinned as Drempt. They are signed as Drempt, but have a little signs underneath with their name.

== Notable people ==
- Klaas-Jan Huntelaar (born 1983), retired professional footballer

== Gallery ==
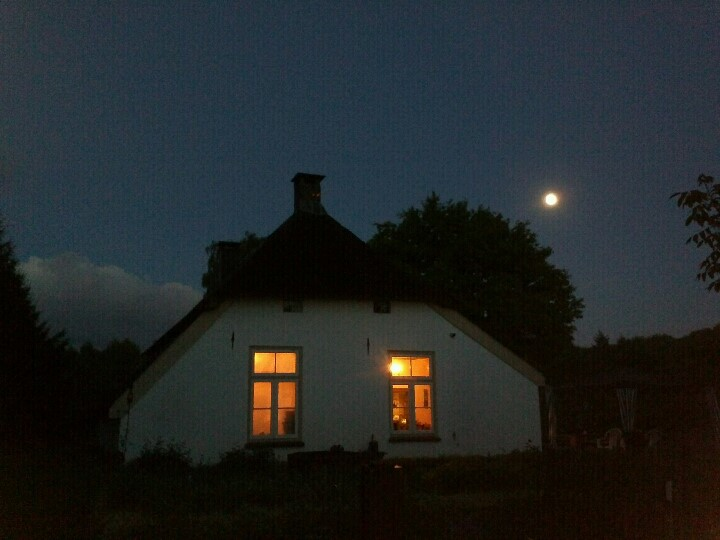
Farm Witte Hemel in moonlight

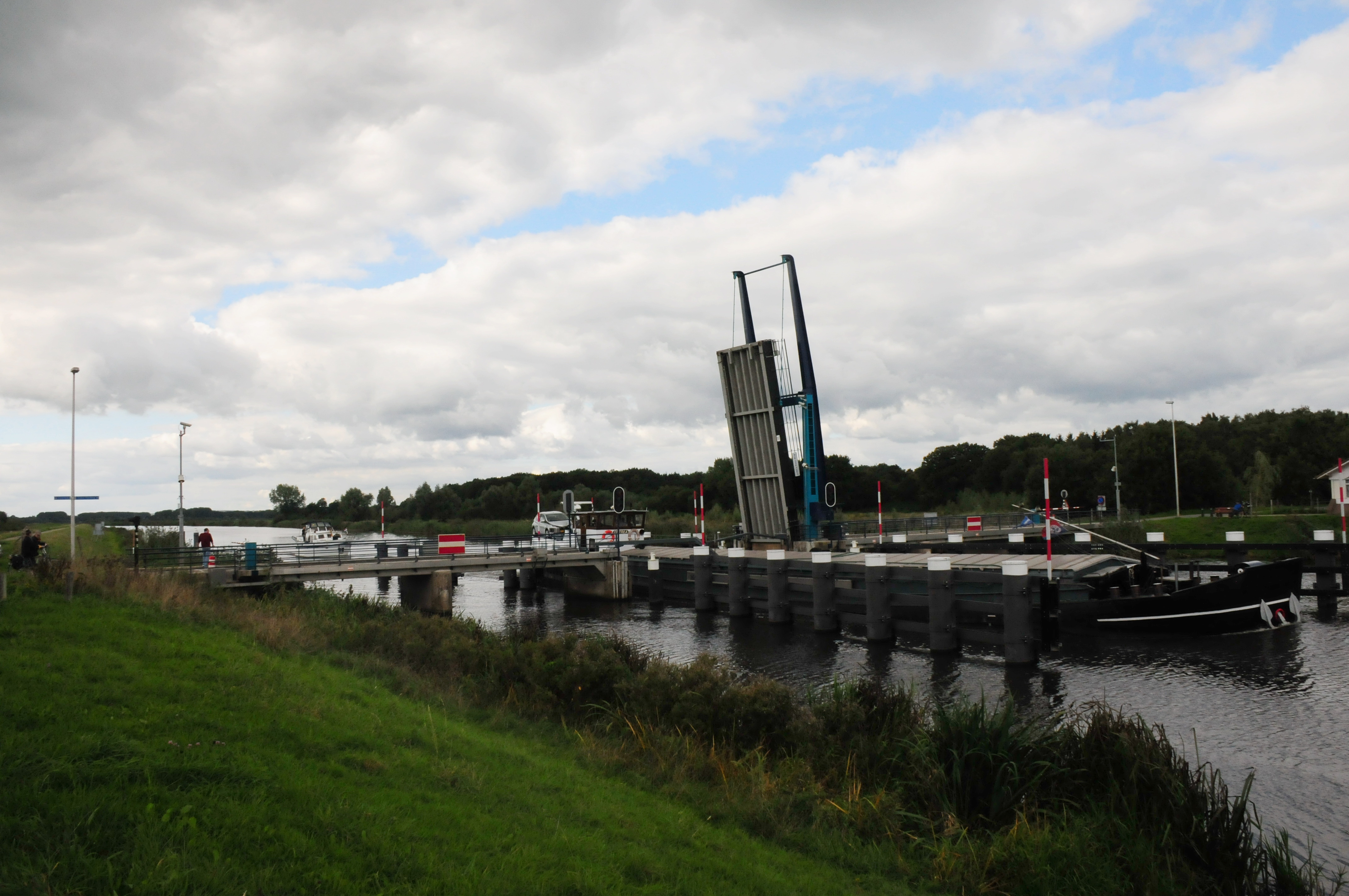
Drawbridge

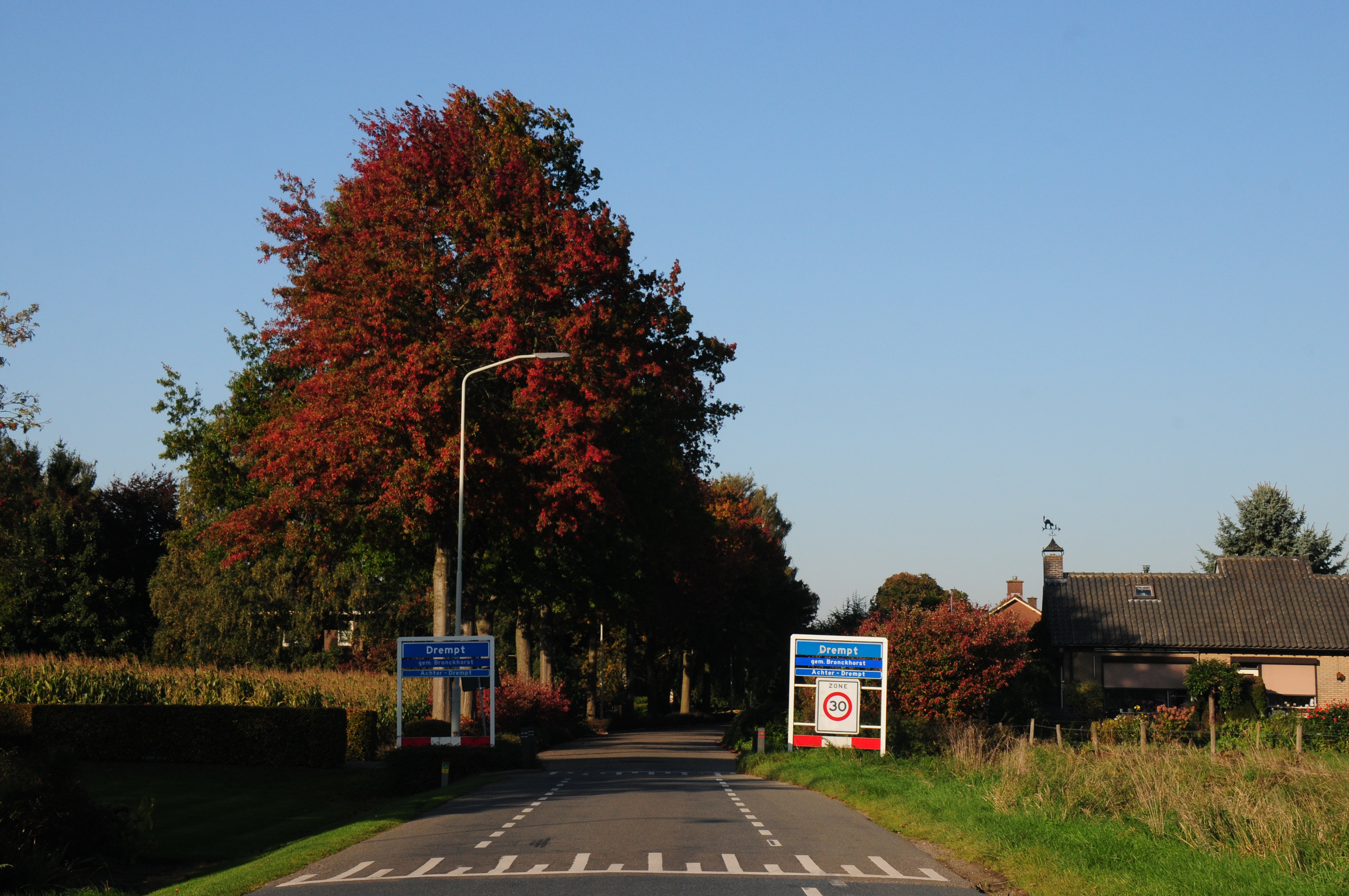
Entrance of Drempt / Achter-Drempt

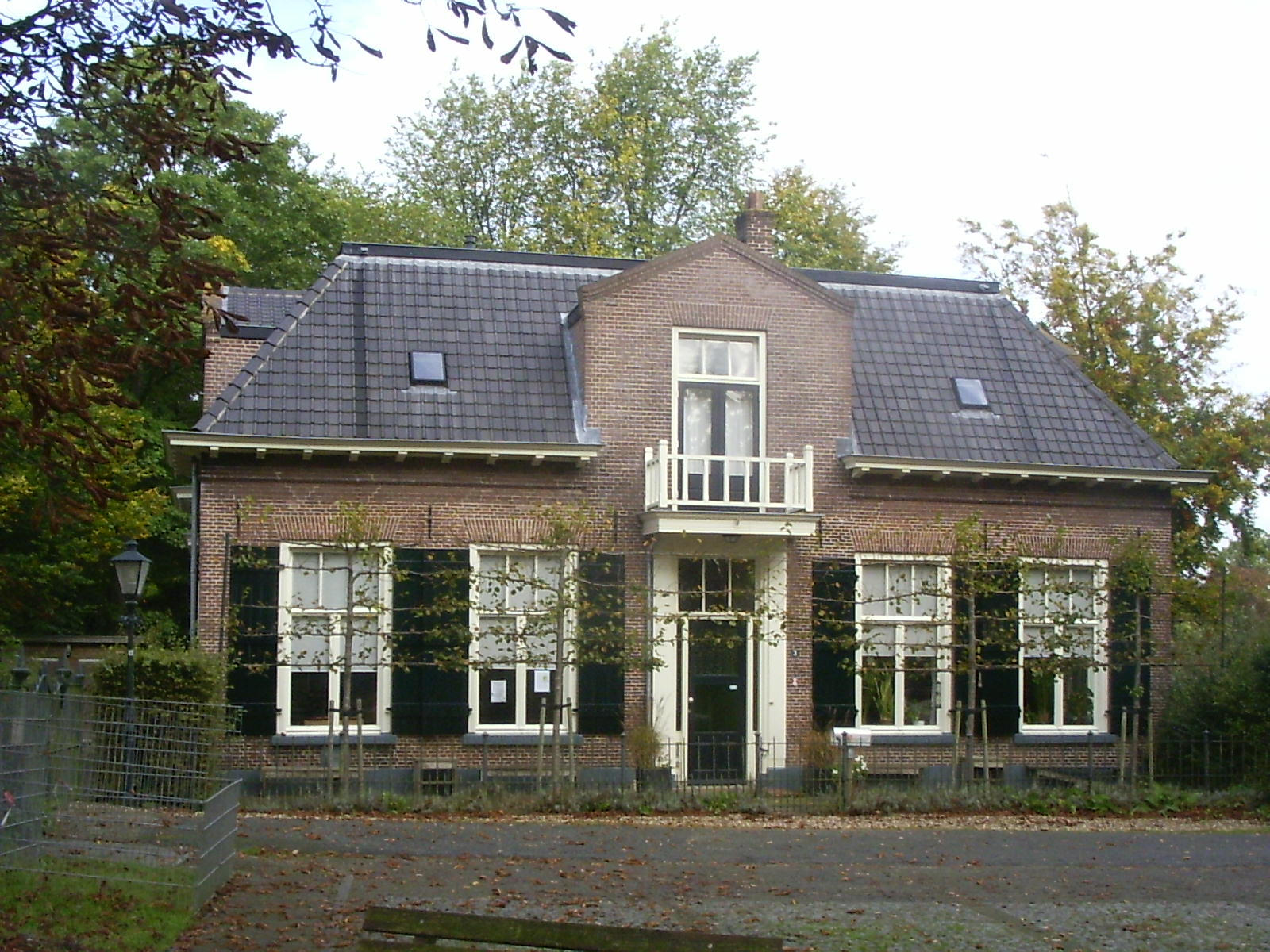
Former clergy house
