= Rha, Netherlands =

Rha
- Hamlet
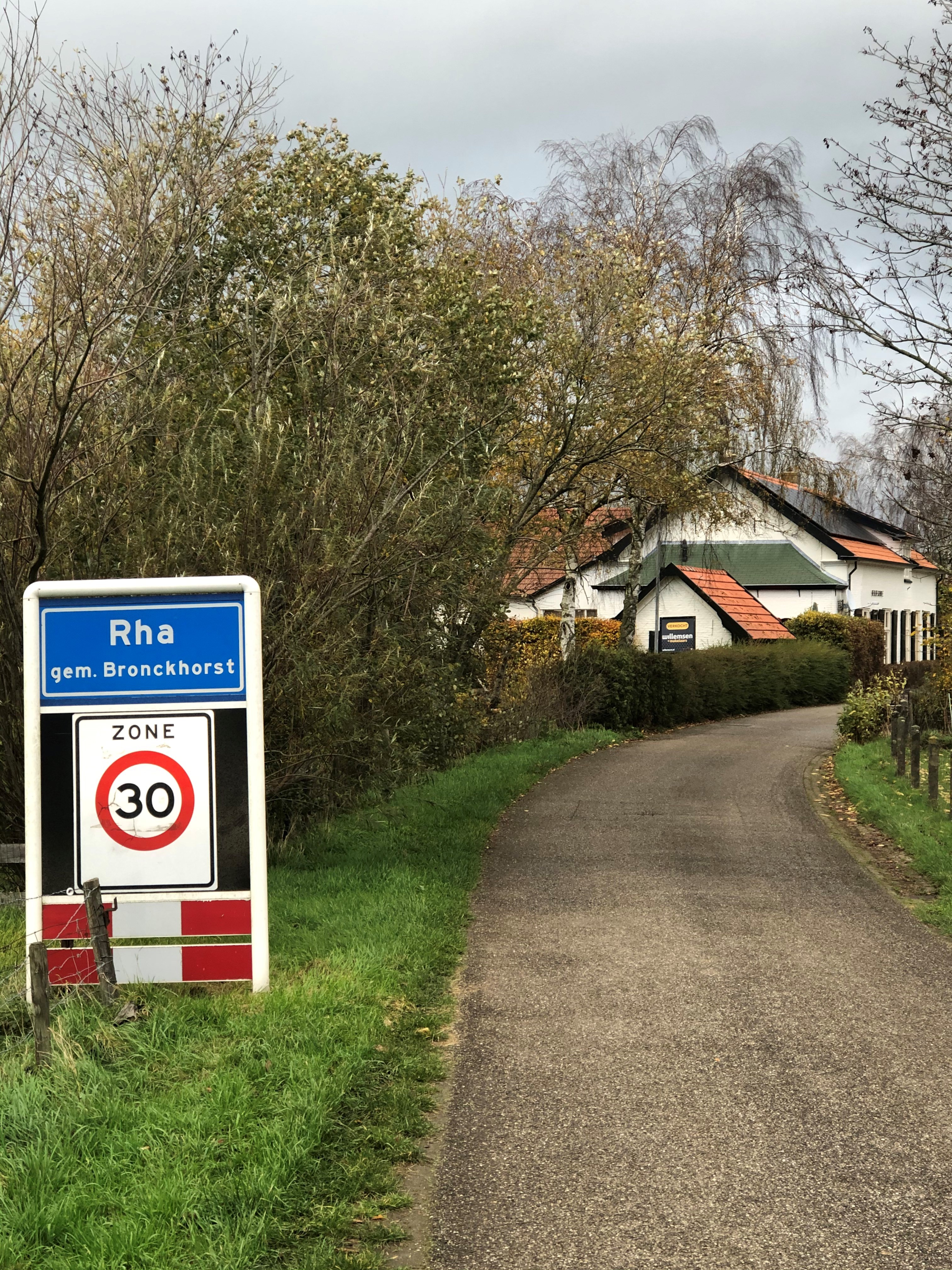
- Southern entrance of Rha village

- Location in the municipality of Bronckhorst

- Location within the province of Gelderland Rha (Netherlands)
- Country: Netherlands
- Province: Gelderland
- Municipality: Bronckhorst

Area
  - Total: 0.48 km^{2} (0.19 sq mi)
- Elevation: 10 m (33 ft)

Population (2021)
  - Total: 70
  - Density: 150/km^{2} (380/sq mi)
- Time zone: UTC+1 (CET)
  - Summer (DST): UTC+2 (CEST)
- Postal code: 7224
- Dialing code: 0575

Rha is a hamlet in the municipality of Bronckhorst, Gelderland, the Netherlands.

Its population is about 75 and Rha and nearby Olburgen celebrated their 1000-year existence in 1996. Windmill De Hoop is located in Rha as well as the Bronckhorster Brewing Company.

== Gallery ==
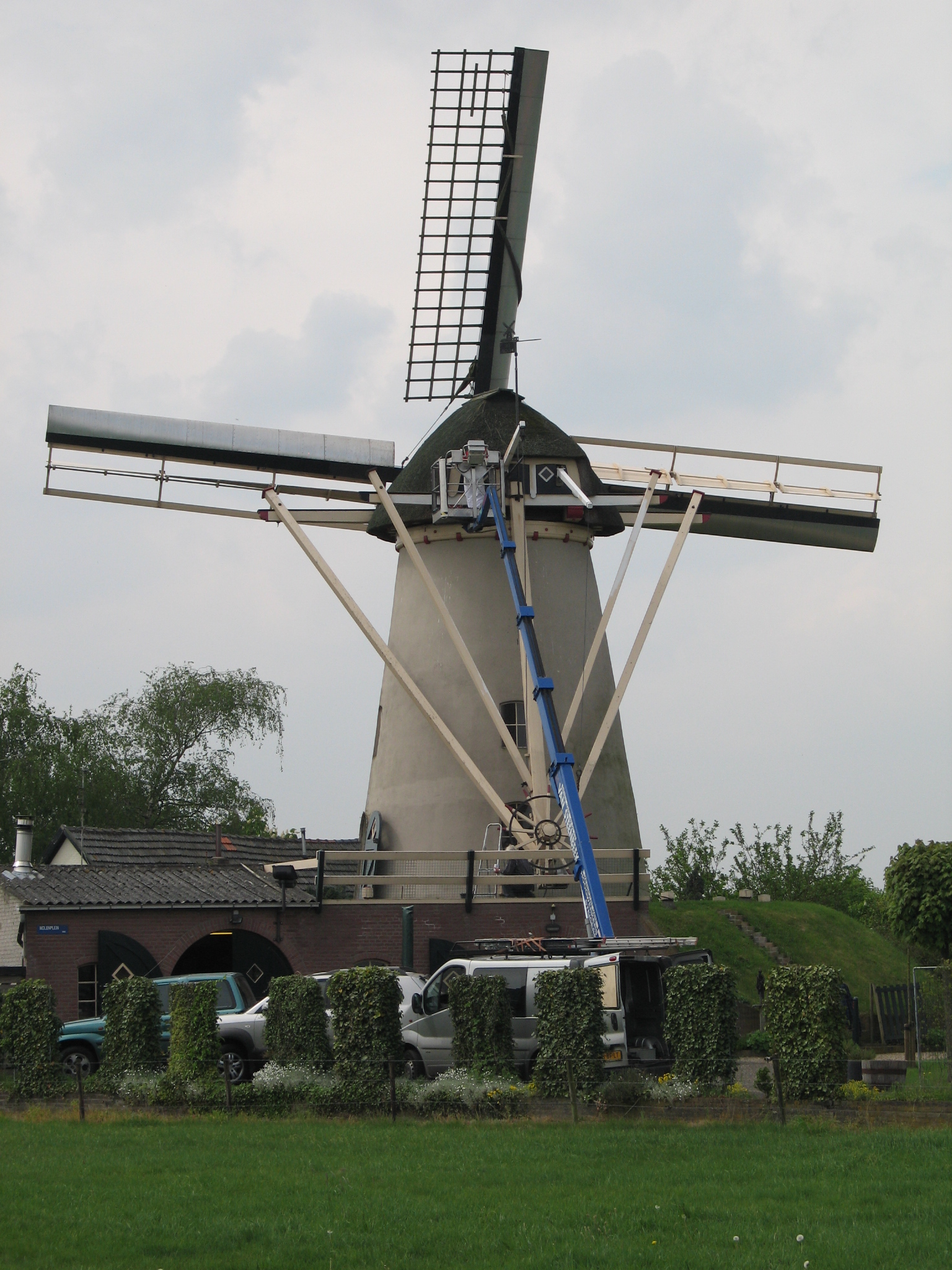
De Hoop
