= Klaas-Jan Huntelaar =

Dutch footballer (born 1983)

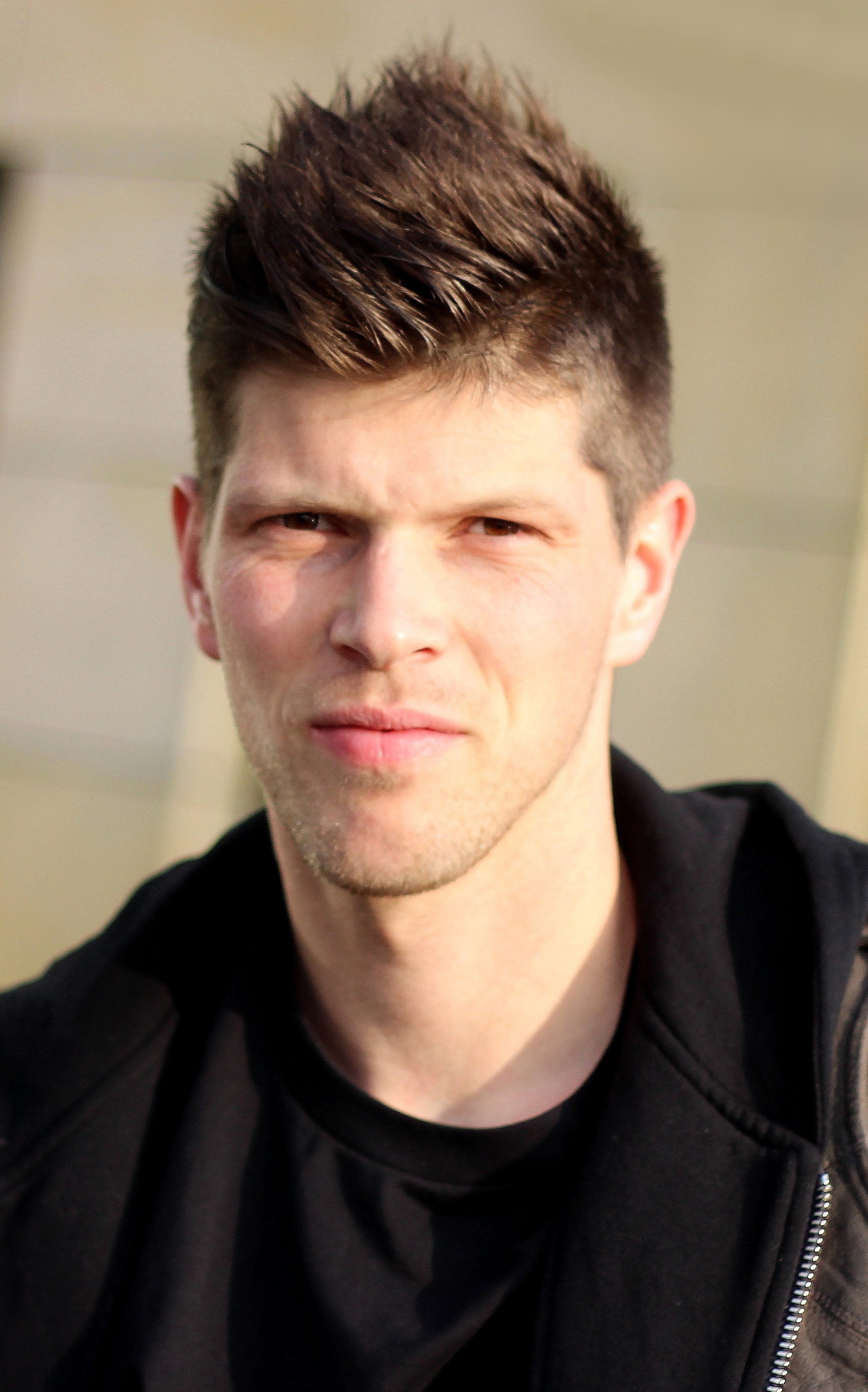
- Huntelaar in 2015

Personal information
- Full name: Dirk Jan Klaas Huntelaar
- Date of birth: 12 August 1983 (age 43)
- Place of birth: Drempt, Netherlands
- Height: 1.86 m (6 ft 1 in)
- Position: Striker

Youth career
- 1988–1994: VV H. en K.
- 1994–2000: De Graafschap
- 2000–2002: PSV Eindhoven

Senior career*
Years	Team	Apps	(Gls)
2002–2004	PSV Eindhoven	1	(0)
2003	→ De Graafschap (loan)	9	(0)
2003–2004	→ AGOVV (loan)	35	(26)
2004–2006	Heerenveen	46	(33)
2006–2009	Ajax	92	(76)
2009	Real Madrid	20	(8)
2009–2010	AC Milan	25	(7)
2010–2017	Schalke 04	175	(82)
2017–2021	Ajax	85	(45)
2021	Schalke 04	9	(2)
Total		497	(279)

International career
2000	Netherlands U17	6	(3)
2001	Netherlands U18	2	(1)
2000–2002	Netherlands U19	20	(8)
2002–2006	Netherlands U21	23	(18)
2006–2015	Netherlands	76	(42)
Medal record
Men's football
Representing Netherlands
FIFA World Cup
Runner-up	2010 South Africa
Third place	2014 Brazil
UEFA European Under-21 Championship
Winner	2006 Portugal
UEFA European Under-17 Championship
Bronze medal – third place	2000 Israel
- * Club domestic league appearances and goals

Dirk Jan Klaas Huntelaar (born 12 August 1983), known professionally as Klaas-Jan Huntelaar (Dutch pronunciation: [ˌklaːˈɕjɑn ˈɦʏntəlaːr]), (Note: In isolation, Klaas and Jan are pronounced [klaːs] and [jɑn], respectively.) is a Dutch former professional footballer who played as a striker.

Huntelaar played for PSV, De Graafschap, AGOVV Apeldoorn, Heerenveen, Ajax, Real Madrid and AC Milan, before joining Schalke 04 in August 2010, for whom he was the top goalscorer in the 2011–12 Bundesliga with 29 league goals. Huntelaar is also Schalke's second highest goalscorer of all time, behind Klaus Fischer.

Huntelaar was named Dutch Football Talent of the Year and Ajax "Player of the Year" in 2006, and was a part of the Dutch side that won the 2006 UEFA U-21 Championship where he became the tournament's leading goalscorer and received the player of the tournament award. He was also named as one of two strikers in the UEFA Team of the Tournament. He is the all-time top scorer of the Netherlands U-21 national team with 18 goals in 23 appearances.

== Early life ==
Huntelaar was born in Voor-Drempt, a village in the Achterhoek region of Netherlands, but moved to Hummelo when he was six weeks old. He lived with parents Dirk-Jan and Maud Huntelaar, and his two brothers Niek and Jelle. At the age of five, Huntelaar, along with his two brothers, joined the local football team VV H. en K., where he played for the next six years. He was scouted as a youth talent during this period by Go Ahead Eagles but the distance required to travel to the team's base in Deventer prevented him from joining the club.

Soon after, he was scouted by De Graafschap and on 6 April 1994 he signed his first youth contract, aged 10. During his first two years with De Graafschap, Huntelaar played in various positions including left wing, attacking midfield, left back, and even goalkeeper; only in his third year was he deployed as a striker.

In the 1997–98 season, the 14-year-old Huntelaar was the main striker for the C-team at De Graafschap and scored 33 goals in 20 matches. The following season saw him promoted to the B1 team, and in the 1999–2000 season he became top scorer of the B1 league with 31 goals. His goalscoring abilities drew the attention of PSV Eindhoven, who subsequently signed him in June 2000.

== Club career ==
=== PSV ===
In his first season at PSV, Huntelaar quickly established himself as a prolific goalscorer for their A1 youth teams under coach Willy van der Kuijlen, scoring 26 goals in 23 games to become top scorer in the youth league. In his second season at PSV, Huntelaar was added to the senior squad under coach Guus Hiddink. He made his first team debut on 23 November 2002 in a 0–3 away win over Roosendaal, coming on as a second-half substitute for Mateja Kežman in the 76th minute. However, this turned out to be his only appearance for PSV.

=== De Graafschap ===
By the start of 2003, it was clear that Huntelaar's path into the first team was blocked, therefore he was sent out on loan to his previous club De Graafschap, where his uncle was financial director. He made his senior debut for De Graafschap on 8 February 2003, coming on as a substitute for Hans van de Haar against Roosendaal. He made his only appearance in the starting lineup on 16 February 2003 as De Graafschap were beaten 1–5 by his future club Heerenveen. He then made his final appearance in the team on 29 May 2003 as De Graafschap lost 2–1 to FC Zwolle, confirming their demotion from the Eredivisie. In total, Huntelaar made nine Eredivisie appearances for De Graafschap, one as a starter and eight as a substitute, but was unable to score and De Graafschap decided not to extend his loan.

=== AGOVV ===
At the start of the 2003–04 season, Huntelaar was again sent out on loan, this time to newly promoted Eerste Divisie side AGOVV Apeldoorn under coach Jurrie Koolhof. He made a solid start, scoring on his debut for AGOVV against TOP Oss, and then scoring a hat-trick in his second league game against Heracles Almelo. Huntelaar scored 26 goals in 35 league appearances and finished the season as the division's top goalscorer as well as being named the Eerste Divisie's Player of the Season. AGOVV later went on to name one of the stands at their Sportpark Berg & Bos stadium the "Klaas-Jan Huntelaar stand" in tribute to his impact at the club.

=== Heerenveen ===
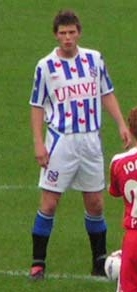
Huntelaar with Heerenveen in 2008

At the end of his loan at AGOVV, Huntelaar turned down the opportunity to sign a new contract with PSV, and Frisian club Heerenveen moved in to sign him. Huntelaar started the 2004–05 season by scoring on his Eredivisie debut with Heerenveen against AZ Alkmaar and took his scoring tally to ten goals in 17 games at the winter break. At the end of the season, Huntelaar had scored a total of 17 goals in 31 matches, helping Heerenveen qualify for the 2005–06 UEFA Cup. In the 2005–06 season, Huntelaar continued where he had left off in his first season at Heerenveen, and by the winter, he had scored 17 goals in 15 matches at which point the top Dutch clubs began vying for his signature.

=== Ajax ===
==== 2005–06 season ====
In January 2006, Huntelaar signed for Ajax, the club he had supported as a child. Heerenveen received €9 million plus future incentives for the player, with 15% (€1.35 million) of the fee going to PSV. Huntelaar made his Ajax debut after the winter break and scored his first goal for the team on 5 February 2006 against former club Heerenveen in a KNVB Cup tie. In February, Huntelaar scored nine goals in seven matches for Ajax, including against Serie A club Inter Milan on his UEFA Champions League debut. Huntelaar ended the season as top scorer for Ajax with 16 league goals in 16 appearances despite only joining in January, and also finished up as the Eredivise's top scorer with 33 league goals. He scored a total of 44 goals in 47 appearances in all club competitions. Ajax finished fourth in the Eredivisie and Huntelaar featured in the Eredivisie Playoffs for Champions League qualification, scoring in consecutive matches against Feyenoord as well as playing in the victory over Groningen to secure Ajax's place in the following season's Champions League. In the KNVB Cup semi-final, Huntelaar scored a bicycle kick equalizer in injury-time against Roda JC, taking the game to extra-time. Ajax went on to win 4–1 with Huntelaar scoring another goal in the 109th minute. In the final, against his former club PSV, Huntelaar scored two goals to help Ajax win the KNVB Cup 2–1. Huntelaar was named Dutch Football Talent of the Year and Ajax Player of the Year for 2005–06.

==== 2006–07 season ====
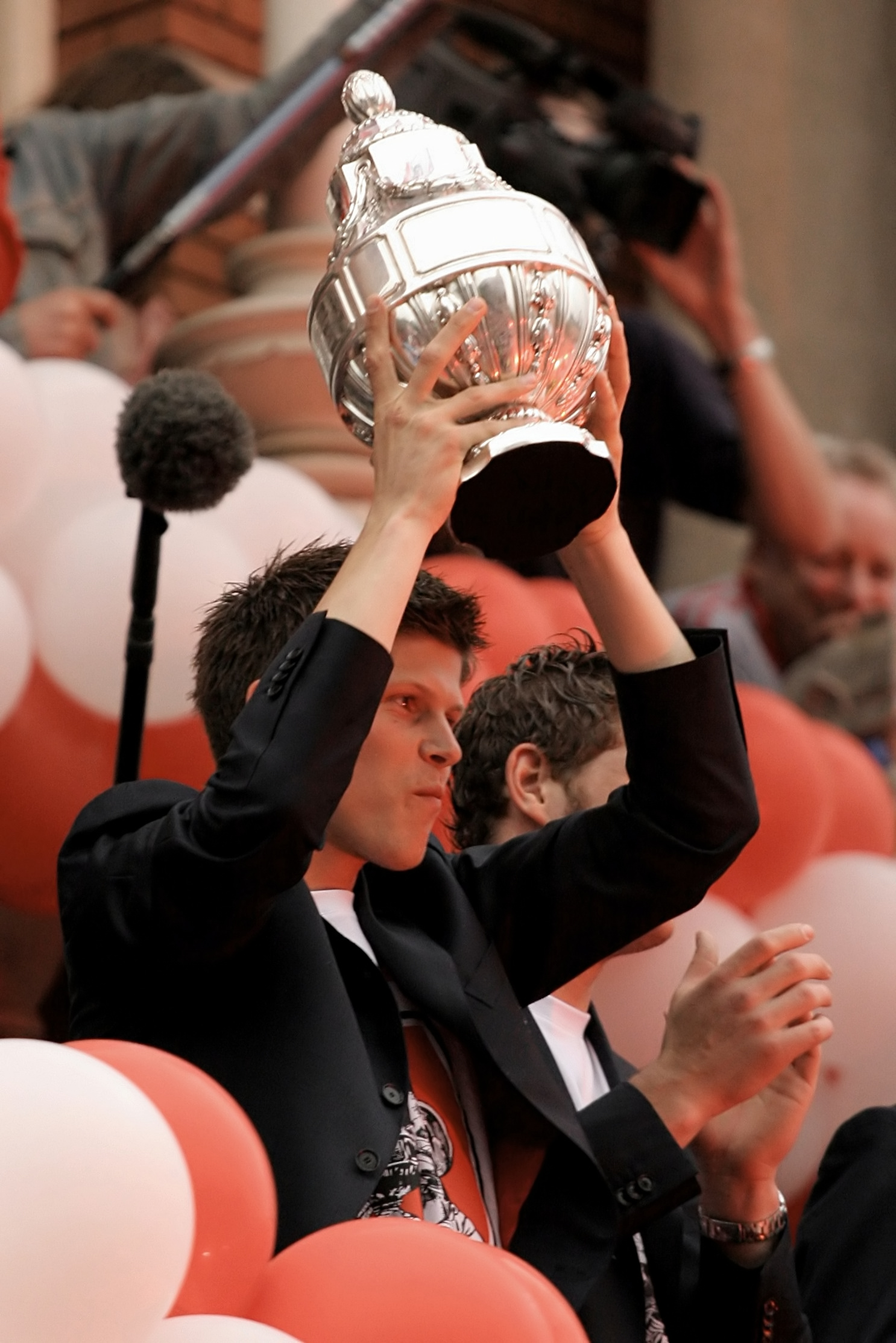
Huntelaar celebrating Ajax's victory in the KNVB Cup

In July 2006, Huntelaar became the first player to score at Arsenal's new Emirates Stadium in a testimonial match for Dennis Bergkamp. He was named vice-captain of Ajax for 2006–07 in his first full season at the club. Huntelaar scored two goals for Ajax in a Champions League qualifying match against Copenhagen to secure a 1–2 away win in the first leg, but a 0–2 home defeat in the second leg saw them knocked out of the Champions League on aggregate. Ajax went on to play in the UEFA Cup, where Huntelaar scored seven goals in seven matches, including against Werder Bremen, who would eliminate them in the third round. In the Eredivisie, Huntelaar scored 21 goals as Ajax again finished second, once more having to play in the Eredivisie Playoffs to claim a place in the Champions League. Huntelaar scored two goals in the second leg of the Playoffs semi-final against Heerenveen in a 4–1 aggregate win. Ajax then beat AZ Alkmaar 4–2 on aggregate for a place in the third qualifying round of the Champions League. In the KNVB Cup, Huntelaar scored four goals in six matches, including an equalizer in the final against Alkmaar which ended in a 1–1 draw after extra-time. Huntelaar scored in the penalty shoot-out decider to help Ajax retain the KNVB Cup, winning 8–7 on penalties. Huntelaar scored 36 goals in 51 games in all competitions for Ajax in 2006–07.

==== 2007–09 ====
In 2007–08, Huntelaar partnered up front with new striking-partner Luis Suárez. However, Ajax were again knocked out of the Champions League at the qualifying stage, with Huntelaar missing a penalty in the first leg against Slavia Prague. Ajax were also eliminated from the UEFA Cup by Dinamo Zagreb on away goals, with Huntelaar's two goals not enough to secure Ajax's place in the competition.

In the first Eredivisie match of the season, Huntelaar scored four goals in a 1–8 away victory over newly promoted De Graafschap. Following the retirement of Jaap Stam in October 2007, Huntelaar was made temporary captain, pending the return of experienced midfielder Edgar Davids from injury. On 6 April 2008, Huntelaar scored his 100th goal in the Eredivise with a hat-trick in Ajax's 4–1 win against De Graafschap. In the previous 25 years, only Dennis Bergkamp and Dirk Kuyt had managed that feat before their 25th birthday. Huntelaar finished the season with 33 goals in 34 appearances, becoming top scorer in the Eredivisie and the first Ajax player to score 30 league goals in a season for 21 years, since Marco van Basten in 1986–87. At the start of the 2008–09 season, Marco van Basten was appointed as Ajax coach and named Huntelaar permanent first team captain. Huntelaar scored nine goals in 15 appearances in all competitions before suffering torn ankle ligaments on 9 November 2008 in a league match against Sparta Rotterdam. He would not play again for eight weeks, and this would turn out to be his last game for Ajax.

=== Real Madrid ===
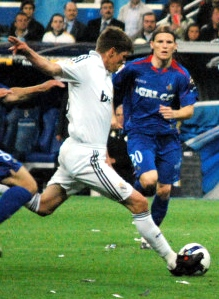
Huntelaar playing for Real Madrid

At the start of December 2008, Real Madrid reached an agreement with Ajax to sign Huntelaar in the mid-season transfer window in January. Huntelaar joined Real Madrid in January 2009 for an initial fee thought to be worth €20 million, potentially rising to €27 million. Huntelaar made his debut on 4 January on his return from injury in a La Liga home match against Villarreal. He played for 56 minutes and made four further appearances as a substitute, before scoring his first goal for the team on 15 February in a 0–4 away win at Sporting Gijón. Madrid had planned to add both Huntelaar and fellow new signing Lassana Diarra to their 2008–09 Champions League squad, but both players had already featured in the same season's UEFA Cup for previous clubs Ajax and Portsmouth, respectively. UEFA rules would allow only one of the pair to be registered by 1 February and Diarra was selected to play in the competition. Huntelaar went on to score eight goals in 20 appearances (13 starts and seven substitute appearances) in just half a season at Real Madrid.

=== A.C. Milan ===
On 6 August 2009, Huntelaar transferred to Serie A club A.C. Milan for €17.75 million, signing a four-year contract. On 29 August, Huntelaar made his competitive league debut for Milan coming on as a sub in the 0–4 loss to cross-city rivals Inter Milan in the Derby della Madonnina. After a slow start, Huntelaar scored his first Milan goals on 29 November in a 0–2 away win at Catania, scoring twice after coming on in the 84th minute.

After the match, manager Leonardo stated that he would give Huntelaar more chances. However, he only appeared as a substitute for the next few matches, and because of the great form of teammate Marco Borriello, Huntelaar did not even appear as a substitute very often until Borriello's injury. Huntelaar capitalized on the opportunity by scoring his second brace of the season, helping Milan to a 3–2 defeat of Udinese. When Borriello hit bad form, Huntelaar was expected to play more often, but Leonardo chose to play veteran Filippo Inzaghi instead. On 3 April, Huntelaar started the match against Cagliari and scored from 30 meters out to stretch his goal tally to seven.

=== Schalke 04 ===
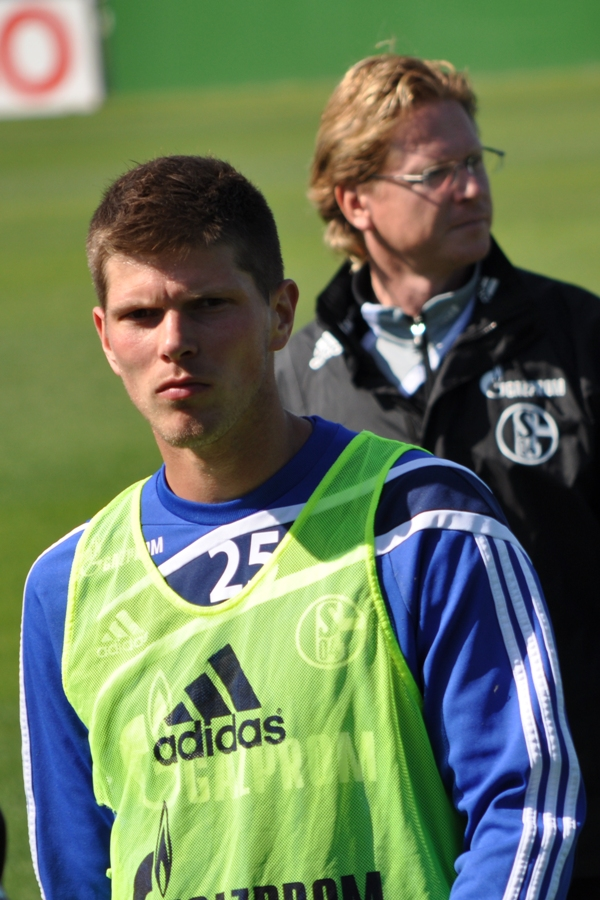
Huntelaar with Schalke

On 31 August 2010, Bundesliga club Schalke 04 signed Huntelaar for a fee of €12 million. On 19 September, he scored his first goal for Schalke in a 1–3 home defeat against regional rivals Borussia Dortmund, and he added two in a Champions League group stage match against Lyon on 24 November 2010. On 21 May 2011, Huntelaar scored a brace against MSV Duisburg in the 2011 DFB-Pokal Final, securing a 5–0 win for Schalke, the club's fifth DFB-Pokal championship and their first major trophy in nine years. Huntelaar finished the 2010–11 season by scoring 13 goals in 35 matches.

On 31 July 2011, Huntelaar scored four times in an 11–1 cup thrashing away to Teningen of the Landesliga Südbaden. and he scored a hat-trick to win Schalke's first points of the season in a 5–1 win over 1. FC Köln at the Veltins-Arena. On 25 August, Huntelaar scored four goals, including two penalties, in a 6–1 win in the qualifying play-off round of the UEFA Europa League against HJK Helsinki, allowing Schalke to overturn a 2–0 first leg deficit and advance to the group stage 6–3 on aggregate. After the resignation of head coach Ralf Rangnick on 22 September 2011, former Royal Blues manager Huub Stevens returned to the team for their game against Hamburger SV on 2 October. Huntelaar powered his side to victory in Stevens' first game back, heading in a sensational opening goal and netting the winner in the 73rd minute with a flick past goalkeeper Jaroslav Drobný. He scored a hat-trick in a 4–1 win over Twente in the Europa League, and finished the season with 38 goals in 37 appearances. He said in February 2012 that he would reach his playing peak in two years time, because of his later physical development. Huntelaar scored a second-half brace in the club's 3–2 victory over Werder Bremen on the last day of the season, earning his side automatic qualification into the group stage of the Champions League. The two goals also meant that Huntelaar finished the season with 29 goals from 34 league games, making him the first Dutch player to earn top scorer in the Bundesliga.

On 23 December 2012, Schalke announced that Huntelaar signed a two-year contract extension to 30 June 2015. Huntelaar finished the 2012–13 season with 16 goals in 35 matches. The following season, Huntelaar scored 14 goals in 21 matches.

On 31 January 2015, Huntelaar received a straight red card for a slide tackle on Manuel Schmiedebach of Hannover 96. The German Football Association (DFB) gave him a six-match ban, which Schalke appealed. On 10 March 2015, Huntelaar scored twice against former club Real Madrid in a 3–4 victory at the Santiago Bernabéu. He had not scored a league goal since November 2014, after going over 1,000 minutes and 13 games without scoring. This has led to some minor criticism over his performance in the current season from his fans and the team's coach. This goalless run, however, ended on 2 May 2015, when he scored an equaliser against VfB Stuttgart. Huntelaar finished the season with 14 goals in 37 matches.

On 8 August 2015, Huntelaar marked his 2015–16 season debut by scoring in a 0–5 win at MSV Duisburg in the first round of the German Cup. Huntelaar finished the 2015–16 season with 16 goals in 40 matches.

Due to injuries and a drop in form, during the 2016–17 Bundesliga season Huntelaar only made 16 appearances in the league (7 starts, 9 appearances from the bench), and overall 24 appearances in all competitions (10 starts, 14 appearances from the bench), scoring a total of only five goals, his lowest season goal tally at Schalke 04.

=== Return to Ajax ===
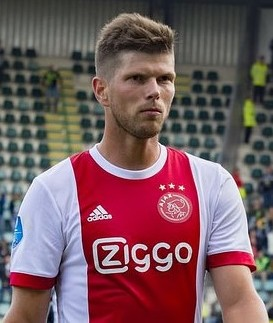
Huntelaar with Ajax in 2017

On 1 June 2017, Ajax confirmed that they had re-signed Huntelaar. In 2019, he won with Ajax the Eredivisie, KNVB Cup and Johan Cruyff Shield; in addition, he played in the 2018–19 UEFA Champions League, in which his team reached the semi-finals.

On 12 December 2020, Huntelaar announced that he would retire at the end of the 2020–21 season.

On 14 January 2021, Huntelaar scored twice within three minutes of coming on as a substitute to give Ajax a 3–1 win over FC Twente.

=== Return to Schalke 04 ===
On 19 January 2021, Schalke 04 confirmed that they had signed Huntelaar until the end of the season. With his goal in the 1–2 defeat against Bayer Leverkusen on 3 April 2021, he became Schalke's oldest Bundesliga goalscorer at the age of 37 years and 234 days.

== International career ==
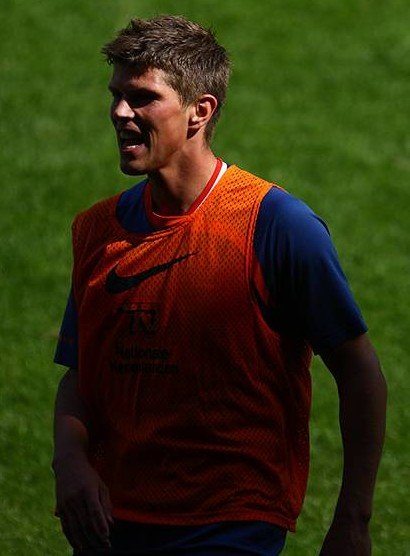
Klaas-Jan Huntelaar in training with the Netherlands

=== Youth ===
Huntelaar played 20 games for the Netherlands national under-19 football team and played in the 2001 FIFA World Youth Championship for the Netherlands under coach Louis van Gaal. He scored two goals in the tournament before the Dutch were eliminated in the quarter-finals by Egypt. After scoring 44 goals in 47 appearances for Heerenveen and Ajax in all competitions during 2005–06, Huntelaar was named in the preliminary Netherlands squad for the 2006 FIFA World Cup, but was not selected for the final squad and instead sent to play in the UEFA Under-21 Championship held in Portugal. Huntelaar became top scorer in the tournament with four goals including two in the final on 4 June 2006 to help the Netherlands beat Ukraine 3–0 and claim their first ever title at under-21 level. Huntelaar was named as one of two strikers in the UEFA Team of the Tournament. In the aftermath, Huntelaar was promoted from the under-21 squad where he remains the Netherlands all-time top goalscorer with 18 goals in 22 matches.

=== Senior ===
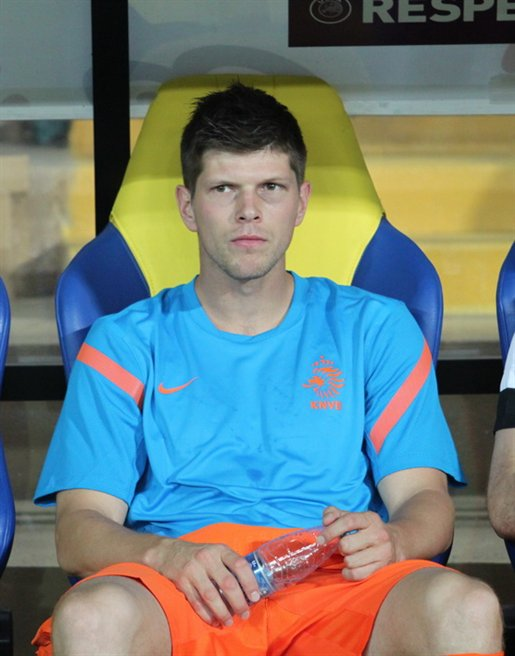
Under manager Bert van Marwijk, Huntelaar deputised for Robin van Persie for the striker position in the Netherlands' poor run in Euro 2012.

Following his achievements with the under-21 squad, Huntelaar was selected by senior team coach Marco van Basten for the Netherlands national team's next friendly match, away against the Republic of Ireland on 16 August 2006. He scored two goals and provided two assists on his senior debut in the Netherlands' 0–4 away win at Lansdowne Road, making him the first Dutch player to score on his full international debut for 28 years since Dick Nanninga in 1978.

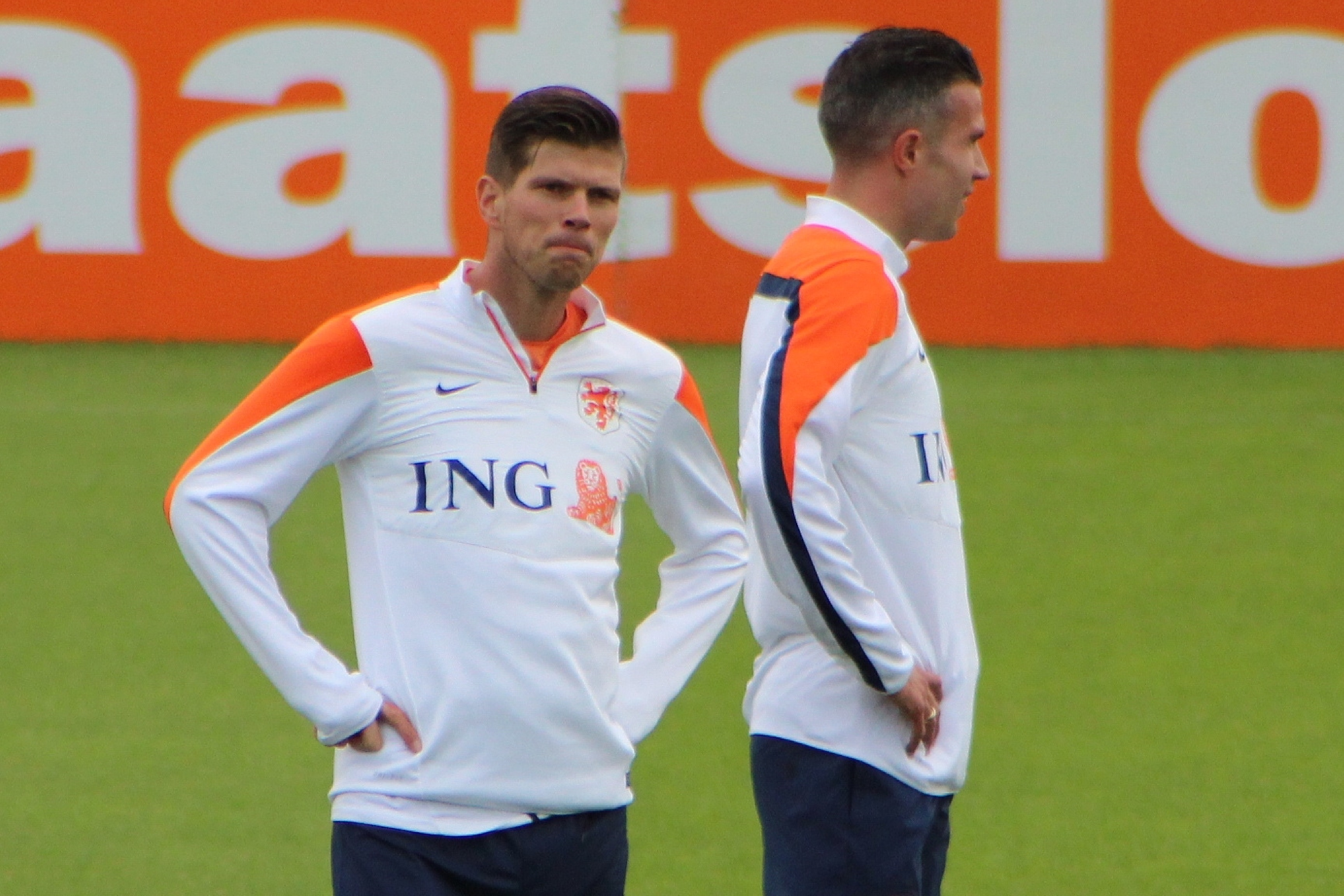
Since Ruud van Nistelrooy's retirement from the national team, Huntelaar opposes Robin van Persie (right) for the first striker position. Both scored a historic combined total of 85 goals in the 2011–12 season at their respective clubs.

After being left out for a number of games, he was recalled to the squad in October 2007 for the UEFA Euro 2008 Qualifying games against Romania and Slovenia. Due to the suspension of striker Ruud van Nistelrooy, Huntelaar was in the starting line-up against Slovenia and went on to score his first competitive international goal in the Netherlands 2–0 victory. Huntelaar was included in the Netherlands Euro 2008 squad, and scored in his only appearance in the tournament with the opening goal of their final Group C match against Romania in a 2–0 victory.

With the retirement of Ruud van Nistelrooy, Huntelaar became the new Netherlands national team coach Bert van Marwijk's first choice striker for the 2010 World Cup qualification match against Iceland in October 2008, and scored in a 2–0 victory. Huntelaar was included in the preliminary squad for the 2010 World Cup in South Africa. On 27 May 2010, Van Marwijk announced that the player would be part of the final squad of 23 participating in the competition. On 24 June, he replaced goalscorer Robin van Persie in the 58th minute against Cameroon at the Green Point Stadium in Cape Town and scored the winning goal in the 83rd minute in a 2–1 win, taking his goal tally to 16 in 34 games for the Netherlands. Huntelaar also came on as a substitute for Van Persie in the round of 16 game against Slovakia and in the quarter-final against Brazil. He was an unused substitute in the final against Spain as the Netherlands lost their third World Cup final 0–1 due to a late goal by Andrés Iniesta.

On 3 September 2010, Huntelaar scored a hat-trick against San Marino in a Euro 2012 qualifying match away at the Stadio Olimpico, a match which the Netherlands won 0–5. He followed this up with both goals for the Netherlands as they defeated Finland on 7 September 2010 in Rotterdam.

Huntelaar added further goals to his tally, with a double in a 4–1 win against Sweden on 12 October 2010. He was the top goalscorer in the UEFA Euro 2012 qualifying competition with 12 goals, leaving him one shy of Northern Ireland's David Healy's all-time qualification record.

At the 2014 World Cup, Huntelaar came off the bench for Robin van Persie in the round of 16 match against Mexico with the Netherlands 0–1 down. He went on to provide the assist for Wesley Sneijder, and scored the winning goal with an injury-time penalty to qualify the team for the quarter-finals. Huntelaar admitted after the match that team captain Arjen Robben was supposed to take the penalty but offered him instead to take the penalty since Huntelaar was playing well after leaving the bench.

== Style of play ==
Huntelaar was described as a "prolific striker" with a "brilliant first touch" and was compared in style to players such as Marco van Basten and Ruud van Nistelrooy. In 2009, former Netherlands national team manager Louis van Gaal was quoted saying about the player, "in the penalty area, he is the best player in the world, bar none."

== Post-playing career ==
=== Ajax ===
Following the departure of director of football affairs Marc Overmars, Huntelaar returned to Ajax in a technical role. He initially supported technical manager Gerry Hamstra and head coach Alfred Schreuder. After their departures, Huntelaar assumed the role of technical manager, reporting directly to director of football Sven Mislintat. His responsibilities included overseeing the progression of players from Jong Ajax to the first team, as well as managing squad composition and contractual matters within the reserve and youth setups. In June 2023, he extended his contract with Ajax until 30 June 2027.

In October 2023, it was reported that Huntelaar had taken medical leave due to burnout. According to his agent Rob Jansen and pundit René van der Gijp, he had been "deeply affected" by internal turmoil during Mislintat's tenure and had "completely broken down" under the pressure. Former Ajax team manager David Endt expressed concern about his condition, suggesting he was not yet ready to return to the role. On 14 March 2025, Ajax announced the mutual termination of Huntelaar's contract, citing ongoing health concerns. The club thanked him for his contributions, with technical director Alex Kroes stating that "his health comes first."

== Personal life ==
Since 2000, Huntelaar has been in a relationship with Maddy Schoolderman. The couple have four children and live in Angerlo, Gelderland. Huntelaar's son, Seb, plays in the academy of PSV Eindhoven.

== Career statistics ==
=== Club ===
Appearances and goals by club, season and competition
Club	Season	League			National cup (Note: Includes KNVB Cup, Copa del Rey, Coppa Italia and DFB-Pokal)		Europe		Other		Total	
Club	Season	Division	Apps	Goals	Apps	Goals	Apps	Goals	Apps	Goals	Apps	Goals
PSV	2002–03	Eredivisie	1	0	0	0	0	0	—		1	0
De Graafschap	2002–03	Eredivisie	9	0	1	0	—		—		10	0
AGOVV	2003–04	Eerste Divisie	35	26	2	1	—		—		37	27
Heerenveen	2004–05	Eredivisie	31	16	1	0	7 (Note: Appearances in UEFA Cup)	3	—		39	19
Heerenveen	2005–06	Eredivisie	15	17	1	1	6	2	—		22	20
Heerenveen	Total		46	33	2	1	13	5	—		61	39
Ajax	2005–06	Eredivisie	16	16	3	5	2 (Note: Appearances in UEFA Champions League)	1	4 (Note: Appearances in Eredivisie play-offs)	2	25	24
Ajax	2006–07	Eredivisie	32	21	6	4	9 (Note: Seven appearances and seven goals in UEFA Cup, two appearances and two goals in UEFA Champions League)	9	4	2	51	36
Ajax	2007–08	Eredivisie	34	33	2	1	4 (Note: Two appearances and two goals in UEFA Cup, two appearances in UEFA Champions League)	2	5 (Note: Four appearances in Eredivisie play-offs, one appearance in Johan Cruyff Shield)	0	45	36
Ajax	2008–09	Eredivisie	10	6	1	1	4	2	—		15	9
Ajax	Total		92	76	12	11	19	14	13	4	136	105
Real Madrid	2008–09	La Liga	20	8	0	0	0	0	—		20	8
A.C. Milan	2009–10	Serie A	25	7	2	0	3	0	—		30	7
Schalke 04	2010–11	Bundesliga	24	8	3	2	8	3	—		35	13
Schalke 04	2011–12	Bundesliga	32	29	3	5	12 (Note: Appearances in UEFA Europa League)	14	1 (Note: Appearance in DFL-Supercup)	0	48	48
Schalke 04	2012–13	Bundesliga	26	10	2	2	7	4	—		35	16
Schalke 04	2013–14	Bundesliga	18	12	1	1	2	1	—		21	14
Schalke 04	2014–15	Bundesliga	28	9	1	0	8	5	—		37	14
Schalke 04	2015–16	Bundesliga	31	12	2	1	7	3	—		40	16
Schalke 04	2016–17	Bundesliga	16	2	3	2	5	1	—		24	5
Schalke 04	Total		175	82	15	13	49	31	1	0	240	126
Ajax	2017–18	Eredivisie	28	13	1	0	3 (Note: Two appearances in UEFA Champions League, one appearance in UEFA Europa League)	0	—		32	13
Ajax	2018–19	Eredivisie	28	16	4	3	11	4	—		43	23
Ajax	2019–20	Eredivisie	18	9	4	0	10 (Note: Eight appearances and one goal in UEFA Champions League, two appearances in UEFA Europa League)	1	—		32	10
Ajax	2020–21	Eredivisie	11	7	0	0	3	0	—		14	7
Ajax	Total		85	45	9	3	27	5	—		121	53
Schalke 04	2020–21	Bundesliga	9	2	0	0	—		—		9	2
Ajax total			177	121	21	14	46	19	13	4	257	158
Schalke 04 total			184	84	15	13	49	31	1	0	249	128
Career total			497	279	44	29	111	55	14	4	665	367

=== International ===
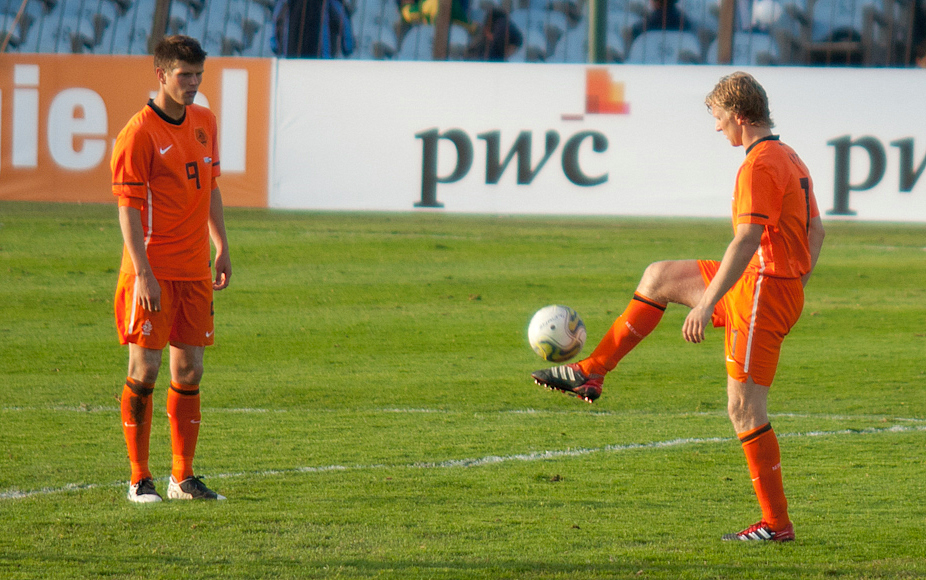
Huntelaar (left) as the Netherlands' #9 with Dirk Kuyt.

Appearances and goals by national team and year
National team	Year	Apps	Goals
Netherlands	2006	4	2
Netherlands	2007	5	1
Netherlands	2008	9	7
Netherlands	2009	11	4
Netherlands	2010	12	11
Netherlands	2011	8	5
Netherlands	2012	10	4
Netherlands	2013	1	0
Netherlands	2014	9	4
Netherlands	2015	7	4
Total		76	42

Scores and results list the Netherlands' goal tally first, score column indicates score after each Huntelaar goal.

List of international goals scored by Klaas-Jan Huntelaar
No.	Date	Venue	Opponent	Score	Result	Competition
1	16 August 2006	Lansdowne Road, Dublin, Republic of Ireland	Republic of Ireland	1–0	4–0	Friendly
2	16 August 2006	Lansdowne Road, Dublin, Republic of Ireland	Republic of Ireland	3–0	4–0	Friendly
3	17 October 2007	Philips Stadion, Eindhoven, Netherlands	Slovenia	2–0	2–0	UEFA Euro 2008 qualifying
4	6 February 2008	Poljud Stadium, Split, Croatia	Croatia	2–0	3–0	Friendly
5	26 March 2008	Ernst Happel Stadion, Vienna, Austria	Austria	1–3	4–3	Friendly
6	26 March 2008	Ernst Happel Stadion, Vienna, Austria	Austria	4–3	4–3	Friendly
7	24 May 2008	De Kuip, Rotterdam, Netherlands	Ukraine	2–0	3–0	Friendly
8	17 June 2008	Stade de Suisse, Bern, Switzerland	Romania	1–0	2–0	UEFA Euro 2008
9	6 September 2008	Philips Stadion, Eindhoven, Netherlands	Australia	1–0	1–2	Friendly
10	11 October 2008	De Kuip, Rotterdam, Netherlands	Iceland	2–0	2–0	2010 FIFA World Cup qualification
11	11 February 2009	Stade Olympique de Radès, Radès, Tunisia	Tunisia	1–0	1–1	Friendly
12	28 March 2009	Amsterdam Arena, Amsterdam, Netherlands	Scotland	1–0	3–0	2010 FIFA World Cup qualification
13	1 April 2009	Amsterdam Arena, Amsterdam, Netherlands	Macedonia	2–0	4–0	2010 FIFA World Cup qualification
14	5 September 2009	De Grolsch Veste, Enschede, Netherlands	Japan	3–0	3–0	Friendly
15	3 March 2010	Amsterdam Arena, Amsterdam, Netherlands	United States	2–0	2–1	Friendly
16	24 June 2010	Cape Town Stadium, South Africa	Cameroon	2–1	2–1	2010 FIFA World Cup
17	3 September 2010	Stadio Olimpico, Serravalle, San Marino	San Marino	2–0	5–0	UEFA Euro 2012 qualifying
18	3 September 2010	Stadio Olimpico, Serravalle, San Marino	San Marino	3–0	5–0	UEFA Euro 2012 qualifying
19	3 September 2010	Stadio Olimpico, Serravalle, San Marino	San Marino	4–0	5–0	UEFA Euro 2012 qualifying
20	7 September 2010	De Kuip, Rotterdam, Netherlands	Finland	1–0	2–1	UEFA Euro 2012 qualifying
21	7 September 2010	De Kuip, Rotterdam, Netherlands	Finland	2–0	2–1	UEFA Euro 2012 qualifying
22	8 October 2010	Zimbru Stadium, Chişinău, Moldova	Moldova	1–0	1–0	UEFA Euro 2012 qualifying
23	12 October 2010	Amsterdam Arena, Amsterdam, Netherlands	Sweden	1–0	4–1	UEFA Euro 2012 qualifying
24	12 October 2010	Amsterdam Arena, Amsterdam, Netherlands	Sweden	3–0	4–1	UEFA Euro 2012 qualifying
25	17 November 2010	Amsterdam Arena, Amsterdam, Netherlands	Turkey	1–0	1–0	Friendly
26	9 February 2011	Philips Stadion, Eindhoven, Netherlands	Austria	2–0	3–1	Friendly
27	2 September 2011	Philips Stadion, Eindhoven, Netherlands	San Marino	5–0	11–0	UEFA Euro 2012 qualifying
28	2 September 2011	Philips Stadion, Eindhoven, Netherlands	San Marino	8–0	11–0	UEFA Euro 2012 qualifying
29	7 October 2011	De Kuip, Rotterdam, Netherlands	Moldova	1–0	1–0	UEFA Euro 2012 qualifying
30	11 October 2011	Råsunda Stadium, Solna, Sweden	Sweden	1–1	2–3	UEFA Euro 2012 qualifying
31	29 February 2012	Wembley Stadium, London, England	England	2–0	3–2	Friendly
32	15 August 2012	King Baudouin Stadium, Brussels, Belgium	Belgium	2–1	2–4	Friendly
33	12 September 2012	Ferenc Puskás Stadium, Budapest, Hungary	Hungary	4–1	4–1	2014 FIFA World Cup qualification
34	12 October 2012	De Kuip, Rotterdam, Netherlands	Andorra	2–0	3–0	2014 FIFA World Cup qualification
35	29 June 2014	Estádio Castelão, Fortaleza, Brazil	Mexico	2–1	2–1	2014 FIFA World Cup
36	10 October 2014	Amsterdam Arena, Amsterdam, Netherlands	Kazakhstan	1–1	3–1	UEFA Euro 2016 qualifying
37	16 November 2014	Amsterdam Arena, Amsterdam, Netherlands	Latvia	3–0	6–0	UEFA Euro 2016 qualifying
38	16 November 2014	Amsterdam Arena, Amsterdam, Netherlands	Latvia	6–0	6–0	UEFA Euro 2016 qualifying
39	28 March 2015	Amsterdam Arena, Amsterdam, Netherlands	Turkey	1–1	1–1	UEFA Euro 2016 qualifying
40	5 June 2015	Amsterdam Arena, Amsterdam, Netherlands	United States	1–0	3–4	Friendly
41	5 June 2015	Amsterdam Arena, Amsterdam, Netherlands	United States	2–1	3–4	Friendly
42	13 October 2015	Amsterdam Arena, Amsterdam, Netherlands	Czech Republic	1–3	2–3	UEFA Euro 2016 qualifying

== Honours ==
Ajax

- Eredivisie: 2018–19, 2020–21
- KNVB Cup: 2005–06, 2006–07, 2018–19
- Johan Cruyff Shield: 2006, 2007, 2019

Schalke 04

- DFB-Pokal: 2010–11
- DFL-Supercup: 2011

Netherlands Youth

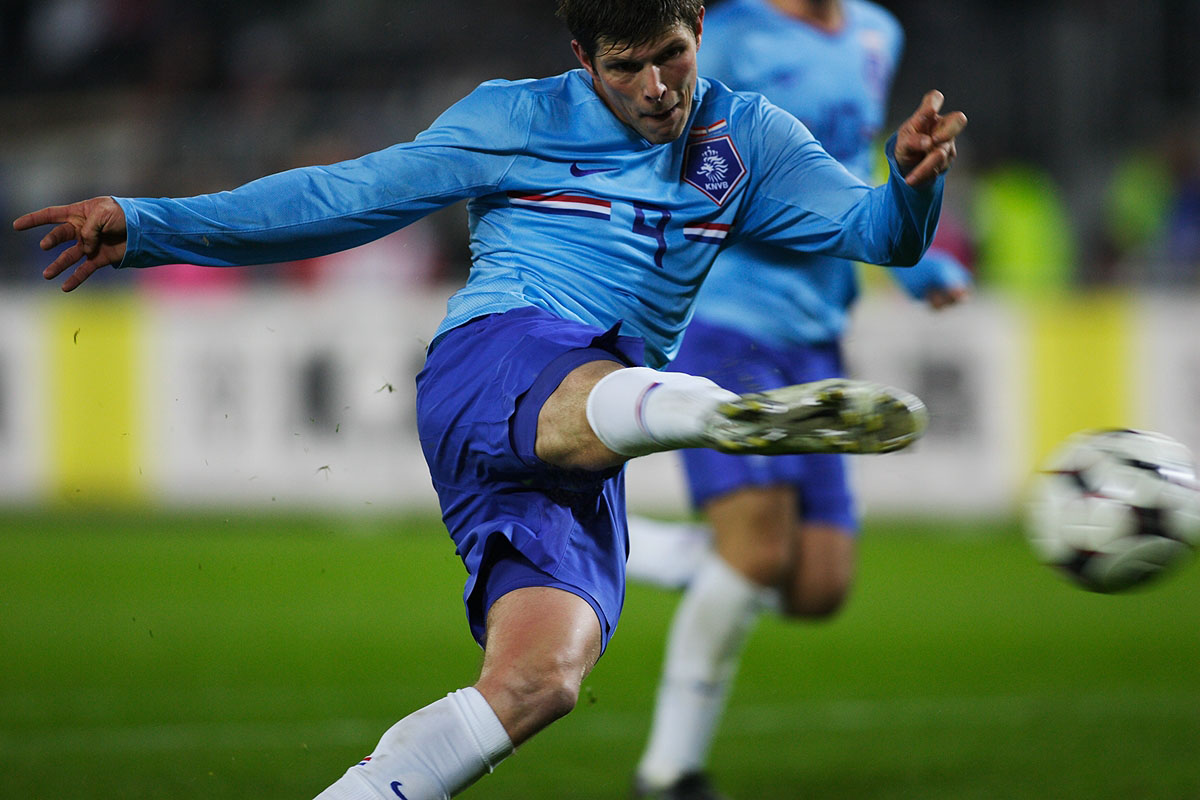
Huntelaar was the Golden Player and Golden Boot at the 2006 UEFA European Under-21 Championship

- UEFA European Under-21 Championship: 2006

Netherlands

- FIFA World Cup runner-up: 2010; third place: 2014

Individual

- Eerste Divisie top scorer: 2003–04
- Eerste Divisie Player of the Year: 2003–04
- Eredivisie top scorer: 2005–06, 2007–08
- Johan Cruyff Trophy: 2005–06
- Ajax Player of the Year (Rinus Michels Award): 2005–06
- UEFA European Under-21 Championship Golden Boot: 2006
- UEFA European Under-21 Championship Golden Player: 2006
- Bundesliga top goalscorer: 2011–12
- kicker Bundesliga Team of the Season: 2011–12
- UEFA Euro 2012 qualifying top goalscorer
