= Baak =

- Village
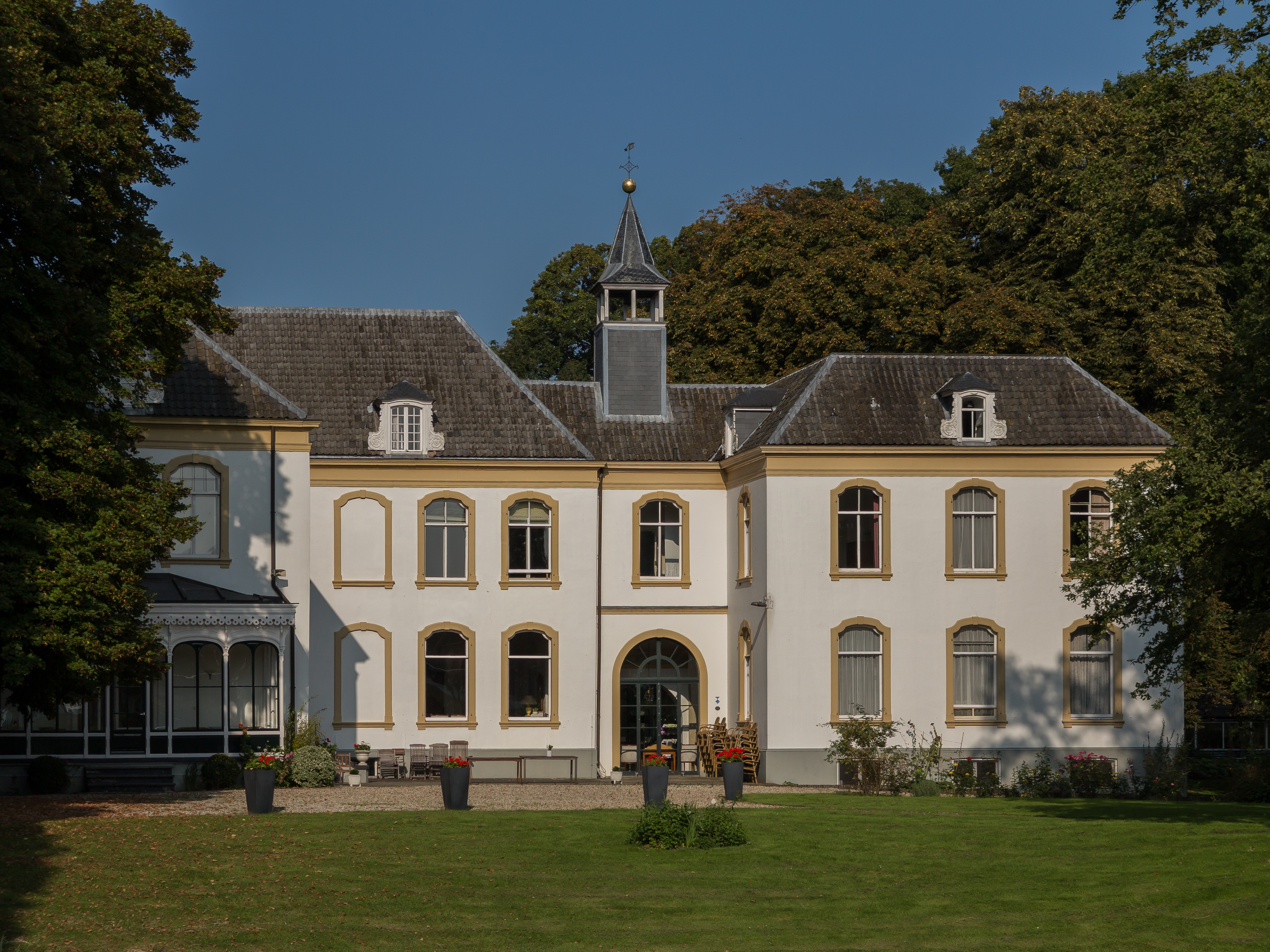
- Country house: huis Baak

- Flag Coat of arms

- Location in the province of Gelderland Baak (Netherlands)
- Coordinates: 52°4′36″N 6°13′37″E
- Country: Netherlands
- Province: Gelderland
- Municipality: Bronckhorst

Area
  - Total: 10.86 km^{2} (4.19 sq mi)
- Elevation: 9 m (30 ft)

Population (2021)
  - Total: 1,085
  - Density: 99.91/km^{2} (258.8/sq mi)
- Time zone: UTC+1 (CET)
  - Summer (DST): UTC+2 (CEST)
- Postal code: 7223
- Dialing code: 0575

Baak is a village in the municipality Bronckhorst in the Achterhoek part of the Dutch province of Gelderland. It stands on the Baakse Beek (literally, Brook of Baak) in the municipality of Bronckhorst, about 10 km from Zutphen.

Baak was founded around 1190 as a hamlet (Dutch: buurtschap). The village has a quite large (for its number of inhabitants) neo-Gothic church, designed by Alfred Tepe. Behind the church its 18th-century predecessor can be found, a so-called barn church which nowadays serves as a cultural centre. In the south of the village, on the premises of a farm, stands the ruined tower of an otherwise vanished Gothic chapel from the 15th century.

Within the village limits one can also find the manor Huize Baak, one of the many manors in this part of the Achterhoek. It houses the Christian organization Ellel Ministries Nederland. The manor and surrounding park can be visited by appointment. The manor can also be seen from the public road; a walking path goes all around the premises.

== Gallery ==
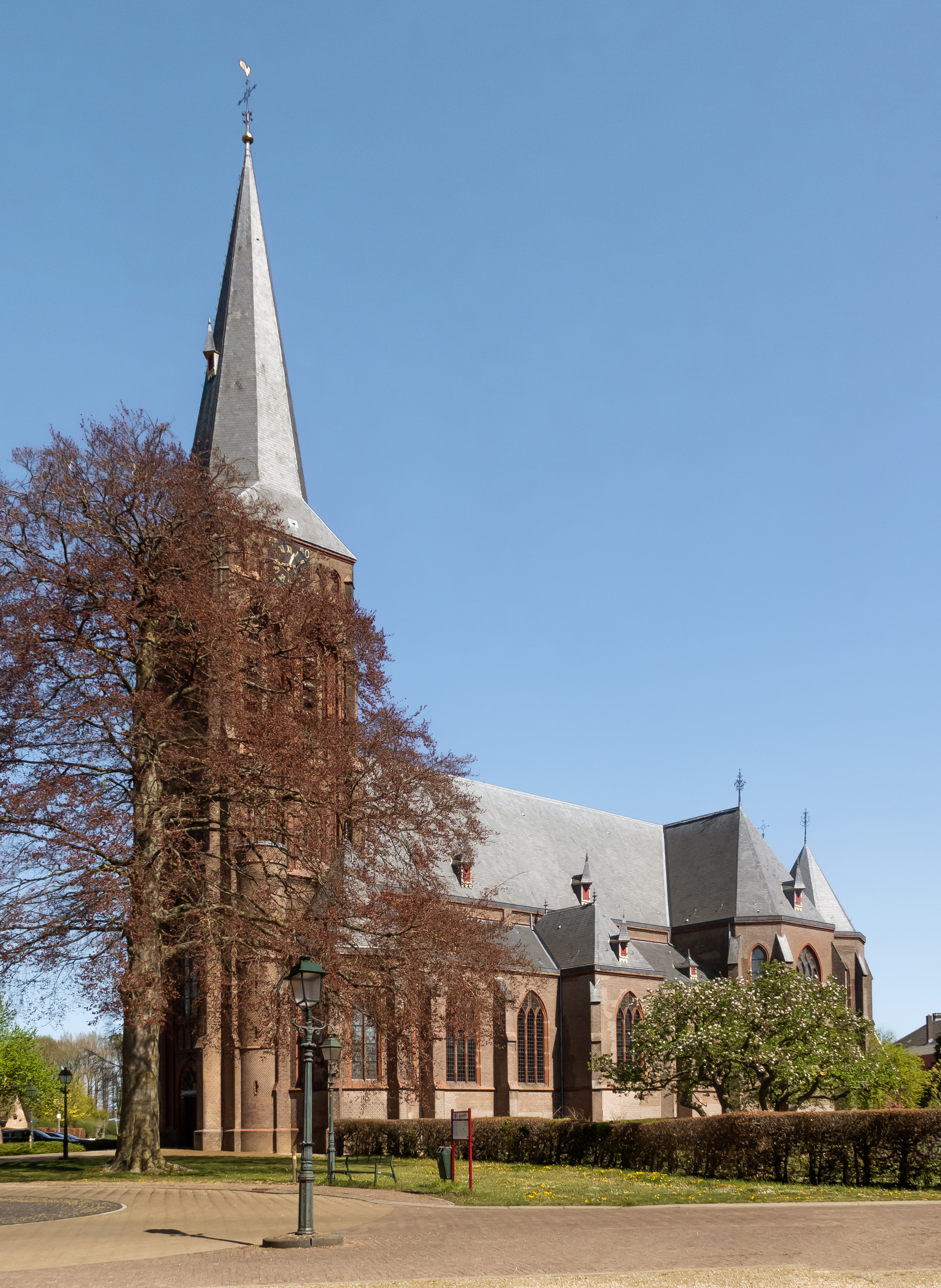
Church: de Sint Martinuskerk

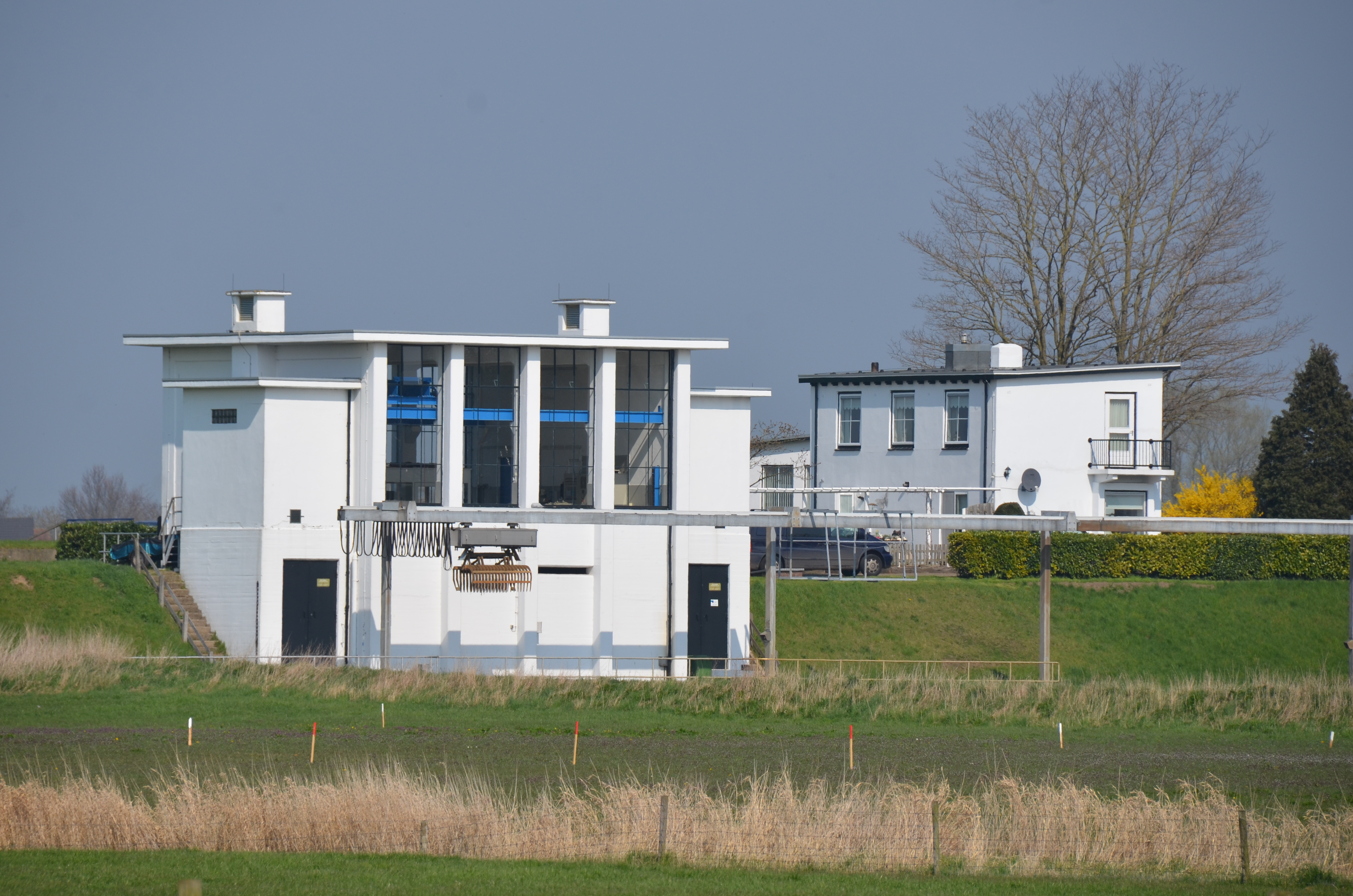
Pumping station

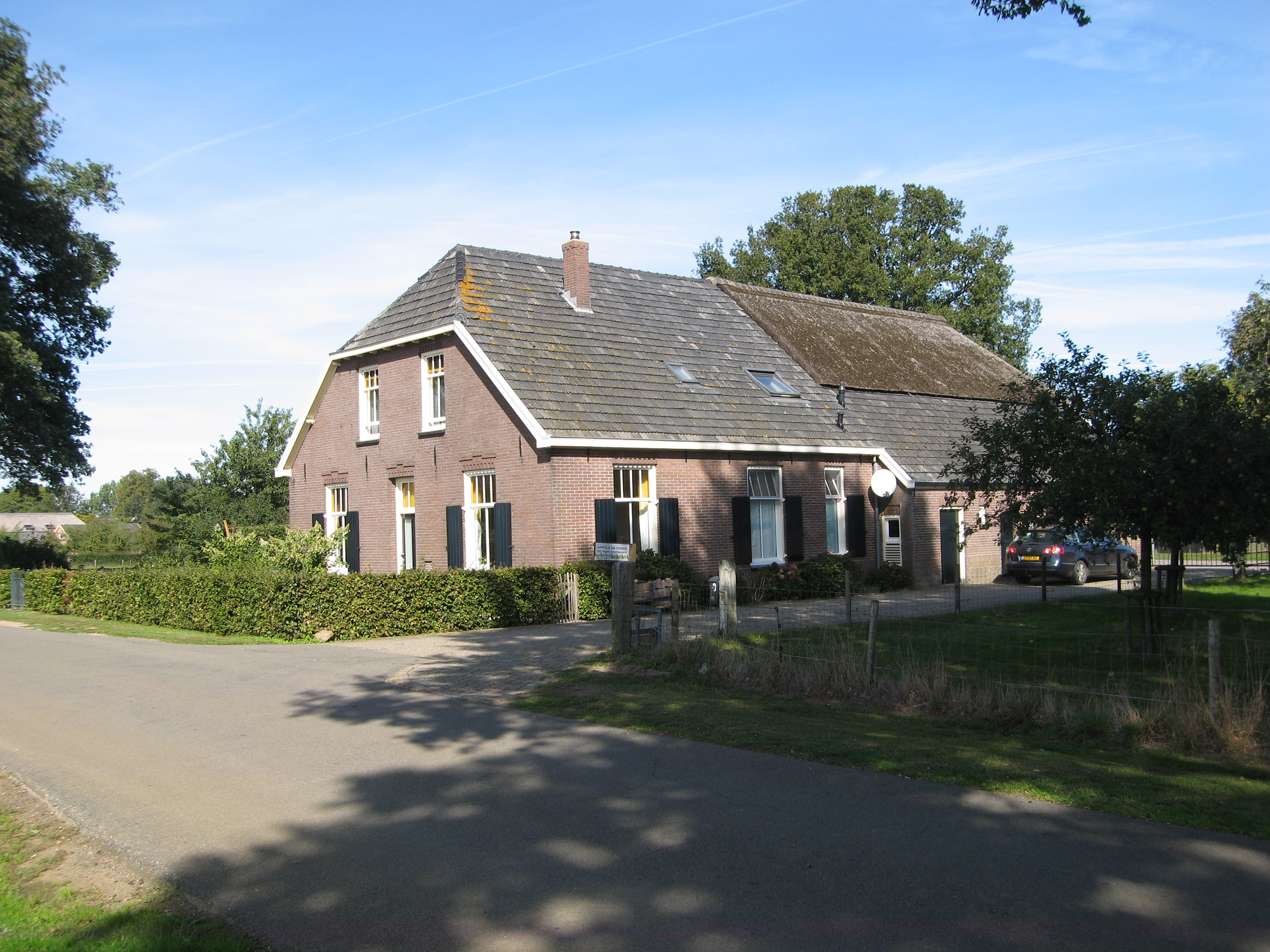
Farm in Baak
