= Zero energy =

Zero energy may refer to:

- A zero energy building (ZEB), a building's use with zero net energy consumption and zero carbon emissions
- Zero-Net-Energy USA Federal Buildings President Obama has ordered that 15% of U.S. Federal buildings be zero-net-energy by 2015 and 100% of all new buildings by 2030
- Zero-energy universe, a concept that states that the total amount of energy in the Universe is exactly zero
- Zero-point energy, the lowest possible energy that a quantum mechanical physical system may have
