= Hagigat =

Hagigat or Haghighat (Persian: حقیقت) is a name that may refer to:

- Fariborz Haghighat (born 1951), Canadian academic
- Hagigat Rzayeva (1907–1969), Azerbaijani actress and singer
- Nahid Hagigat (born 1943), Iranian-American illustrator and artist
