= Zero-energy building =

Energy efficiency standard for buildings

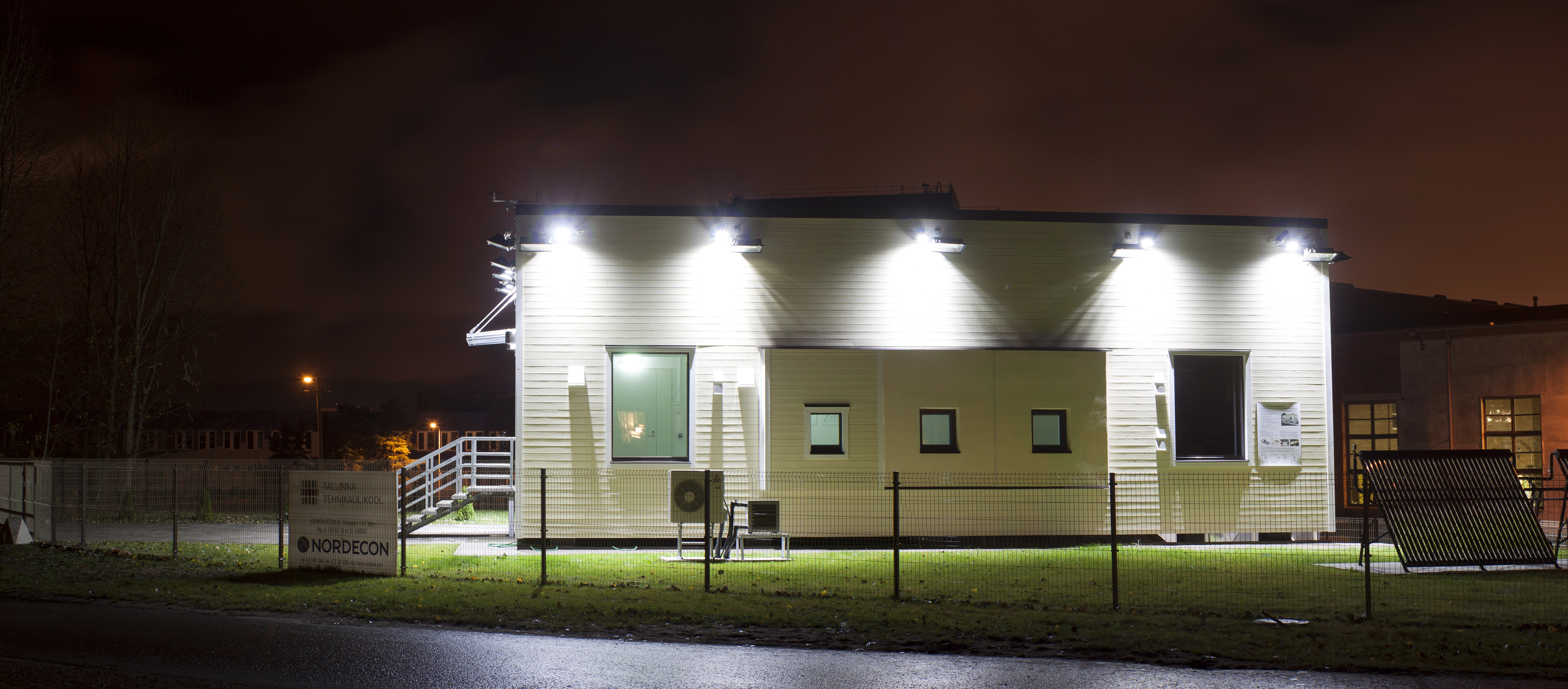
Zero-energy test building in Tallinn, Estonia. Tallinn University of Technology.

A Zero-Energy Building (ZEB), also known as a Net Zero-Energy (NZE) building, is a building with net zero energy consumption, meaning the total amount of energy used by the building on an annual basis is equal to the amount of renewable energy created on the site or in other definitions by renewable energy sources offsite, using technology such as heat pumps, high efficiency windows and insulation, and solar panels.

The goal is that these buildings contribute less overall greenhouse gas to the atmosphere during operation than similar non-NZE buildings. They do at times consume non-renewable energy and produce greenhouse gases, but at other times reduce energy consumption and greenhouse gas production elsewhere by the same amount. The development of zero-energy buildings is encouraged by the desire to have less of an impact on the environment, and their expansion is encouraged by tax breaks and savings on energy costs which make zero-energy buildings financially viable.

Terminology tends to vary between countries, agencies, cities, towns, and reports, so a general knowledge of this concept and its various uses is essential for a versatile understanding of clean energy and renewables. The International Energy Agency (IEA) and European Union (EU) most commonly use "Net Zero Energy", with the term "zero net" being mainly used in the US. A similar concept approved and implemented by the European Union and other agreeing countries is nearly Zero Energy Building (nZEB), with the goal of having all new buildings in the region under nZEB standards by 2020. According to D'Agostino and Mazzarella (2019), the meaning of nZEB is different in each country. This is because countries have different climates, rules, and ways of calculating energy use. These differences make it hard to compare buildings or set one standard for everyone.

== Overview ==
Typical code-compliant buildings consume 40% of the total fossil fuel energy in the US and European Union and are significant contributors of greenhouse gases. To combat such high energy usage, more and more buildings are starting to implement the carbon neutrality principle, which is viewed as a means to reduce carbon emissions and reduce dependence on fossil fuels. Although zero-energy buildings remain limited, even in developed countries, they are gaining importance and popularity.

Most zero-energy buildings use the electrical grid for energy storage but some are independent of the grid and some include energy storage onsite. The buildings are called "energy-plus buildings" or in some cases "low energy houses". These buildings produce energy onsite using renewable technology like solar and wind, while reducing the overall use of energy with highly efficient lightning and heating, ventilation, and air conditioning (HVAC) technologies. The zero-energy goal is becoming more practical as the costs of alternative energy technologies decrease and the costs of traditional fossil fuels increase.

A notable example is the Zero Building in Spain, which demonstrates how an office building can achieve net-zero and even positive energy performance through architectural design, passive strategies, and integrated renewable systems.

The development of modern zero-energy buildings became possible largely through the progress made in new energy and construction technologies and techniques. These include highly insulating spray-foam insulation, high-efficiency solar panels, high-efficiency heat pumps and highly insulating, low emissivity, triple and quadruple-glazed windows. These innovations have also been significantly improved by academic research, which collects precise energy performance data on traditional and experimental buildings and provides performance parameters for advanced computer models to predict the efficacy of engineering designs. A study examines how different countries, including Italy, Germany, and Denmark, approach nearly zero energy buildings. It shows that while the technical solutions are often similar, the targets, baselines, and frameworks for meeting these goals vary significantly (D'Agostino & Mazzarella, 2019).

Zero-energy buildings can be part of a smart grid. Some advantages of these buildings are as follows:

- Integration of renewable energy resources
- Integration of plug-in electric vehicles – called vehicle-to-grid
- Implementation of zero-energy concepts

Although the net zero concept is applicable to a wide range of resources, water and waste, energy is usually the first resource to be targeted because:

- Energy, particularly electricity and heating fuel like natural gas or heating oil, is expensive. Hence reducing energy use can save the building owner money. In contrast, water and waste are inexpensive for the individual building owner.
- Energy, particularly electricity and heating fuel, has a high carbon footprint. Hence reducing energy use is a major way to reduce the building's carbon footprint.
- There are well-established means to significantly reduce the energy use and carbon footprint of buildings. These include: adding insulation, using heat pumps instead of furnaces, using low emissivity, triple or quadruple-glazed windows and adding solar panels to the roof.
- In some countries, there are government-sponsored subsidies and tax breaks for installing heat pumps, solar panels, triple or quadruple-glazed windows and insulation that greatly reduce the cost of getting to a net-zero energy building for the building owner.

=== Optimizing zero-energy building for climate impact ===
The introduction of zero-energy buildings makes buildings more energy efficient and reduces the rate of carbon emissions once the building is in operation; however, there is still a lot of pollution associated with a building's embodied carbon. Embodied carbon is the carbon emitted in the making and transportation of a building's materials and construction of the structure itself; it is responsible for 11% of global GHG emissions and 28% of global building sector emissions. The importance of embodied carbon will grow as it will begin to account for the greater portion of a building's carbon emissions. In some newer, energy efficient buildings, embodied carbon has risen to 47% of the building's lifetime emissions. Focusing on embodied carbon is part of optimizing construction for climate impact and zero carbon emissions requires slightly different considerations from optimizing only for energy efficiency.

A 2019 study found that between 2020 and 2030, reducing upfront carbon emissions and switching to clean or renewable energy is more important than increasing building efficiency because "building a highly energy efficient structure can actually produce more greenhouse gas than a basic code compliant one if carbon-intensive materials are used." The study stated that because "Net-zero energy codes will not significantly reduce emissions in time, policy makers and regulators must aim for true net zero carbon buildings, not net zero energy buildings."

One way to reduced embodied carbon is by using low-carbon materials for construction such as straw, wood, linoleum, or cedar. For materials like concrete and steel, options to reduce embodied emissions do exist, however, these are unlikely to be available at large scale in the short-term. In conclusion, it has been determined that the optimal design point for greenhouse gas reduction appeared to be at four story multifamily buildings of low-carbon materials, such as those listed above, which could be a template for low-carbon emitting structures.

== Definitions ==
Despite sharing the name "zero net energy", there are several definitions of what the term means in practice, with a particular difference in usage between North America and Europe.

Zero net site energy use
In this type of ZNE, the amount of energy provided by on-site renewable energy sources is equal to the amount of energy used by the building. In the United States, "zero net energy building" generally refers to this type of building.

Zero net source energy use
This ZNE generates the same amount of energy as is used, including the energy used to transport the energy to the building. This type accounts for energy losses during electricity generation and transmission. These ZNEs must generate more electricity than zero net site energy buildings.

Net zero energy emissions
Outside the United States and Canada, a ZEB is generally defined as one with zero net energy emissions, also known as a zero carbon building (ZCB) or zero emissions building (ZEB). Under this definition the carbon emissions generated from on-site or off-site fossil fuel use are balanced by the amount of on-site renewable energy production. Other definitions include not only the carbon emissions generated by the building in use, but also those generated in the construction of the building and the embodied energy of the structure. Others debate whether the carbon emissions of commuting to and from the building should also be included in the calculation. Recent work in New Zealand has initiated an approach to include building user transport energy within zero energy building frameworks.

Net zero cost
In this type of building, the cost of purchasing energy is balanced by income from sales of electricity to the grid of electricity generated on-site. Such a status depends on how a utility credits net electricity generation and the utility rate structure the building uses.

Net off-site zero energy use
A building may be considered a ZEB if 100% of the energy it purchases comes from renewable energy sources, even if the energy is generated off the site.

Off-the-grid

Off-the-grid buildings are stand-alone ZEBs that are not connected to an off-site energy utility facility. They require distributed renewable energy generation and energy storage capability (for when the sun is not shining, wind is not blowing, etc.). An energy autarkic house is a building concept where the balance of the own energy consumption and production can be made on an hourly or even smaller basis. Energy autarkic houses can be taken off-the-grid.

Net Zero Energy Building
Based on scientific analysis within the joint research program "Towards Net Zero Energy Solar Buildings" a methodological framework was set up which allows different definitions, in accordance with country's political targets, specific (climate) conditions and respectively formulated requirements for indoor conditions: The overall conceptual understanding of a Net ZEB is an energy efficient, grid-connected building enabled to generate energy from renewable sources to compensate its own energy demand (see figure 1

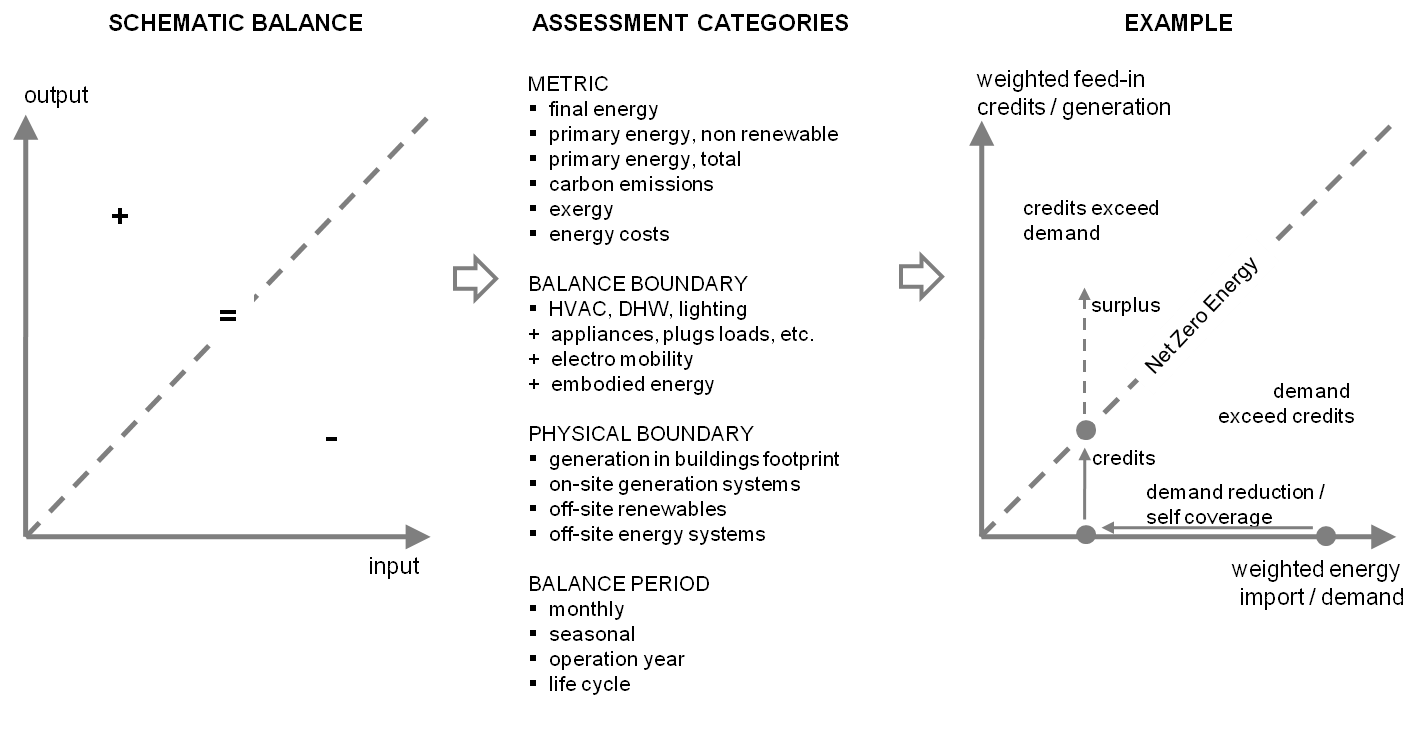
Figure 1: The Net ZEB balance concept: balance of weighted energy import respectively energy demand (x-axis) and energy export (feed-in credits) respectively (on-site) generation (y-axis)

).
The wording "Net" emphasizes the energy exchange between the building and the energy infrastructure. By the building-grid interaction, the Net ZEBs becomes an active part of the renewable energy infrastructure. This connection to energy grids prevents seasonal energy storage and oversized on-site systems for energy generation from renewable sources like in energy autonomous buildings. The similarity of both concepts is a pathway of two actions: 1) reduce energy demand by means of energy efficiency measures and passive energy use; 2) generate energy from renewable sources. However, the Net ZEBs grid interaction and plans to widely increase their numbers of evoking considerations on increased flexibility in the shift of energy loads and reduced peak demands.
Positive Energy District
Expanding some of the principles of zero-energy buildings to a city district level, Positive Energy Districts (PED) are districts or other urban areas that produce at least as much energy on an annual basis as they consume. The impetus to develop whole positive energy districts instead of single buildings is based on the possibility of sharing resources, managing energy efficiently systems across many buildings and reaching economics of scale.

Within this balancing procedure several aspects and explicit choices have to be determined:

- The building system boundary is split into a physical boundary which determines which renewable resources are considered (e.g. in buildings footprint, on-site or even off-site) respectively how many buildings are included in the balance (single building, cluster of buildings) and a balance boundary which determines the included energy uses (e.g. heating, cooling, ventilation, hot water, lighting, appliances, IT, central services, electric vehicles, and embodied energy, etc.). It should be noticed that renewable energy supply options can be prioritized (e.g. by transportation or conversion effort, availability over the lifetime of the building or replication potential for future, etc.) and therefore create a hierarchy. It may be argued that resources within the building footprint or on-site should be given priority over off-site supply options.
- The weighting system converts the physical units of different energy carriers into a uniform metric (site/final energy, source/primary energy renewable parts included or not, energy cost, equivalent carbon emissions and even energy or environmental credits) and allows their comparison and compensation among each other in one single balance (e.g. exported PV electricity can compensate for imported biomass). Politically influenced and therefore possibly asymmetrically or time-dependent conversion/weighting factors can affect the relative value of energy carriers and can influence the required energy generation capacity.
- The balancing period is often assumed to be one year (suitable to cover all operation energy uses). A shorter period (monthly or seasonal) could also be considered as well as a balance over the entire life cycle (including embodied energy, which could also be annualized and counted in addition to operational energy uses).

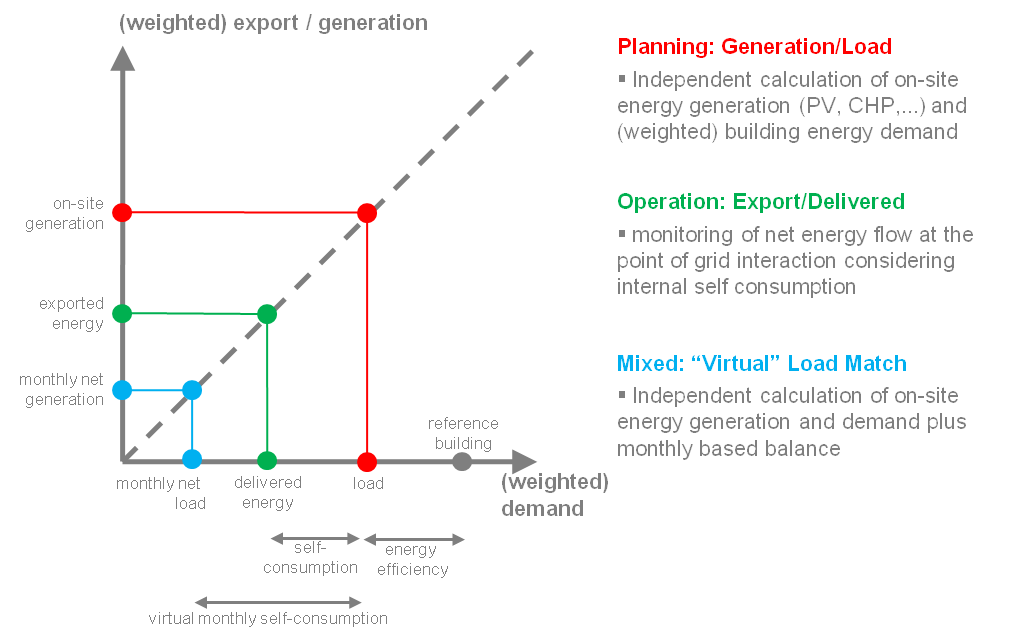
Figure 2: The Net ZEB balance concept: Graphical representation of the different types of balance: import/export balance between weighted exported and delivered energy, load/generation balance between weighted generation and load, and monthly net balance between weighted monthly net values of generation and load.

- The energy balance can be done in two balance types: 1) Balance of delivered/imported and exported energy (monitoring phase as self-consumption of energy generated on-site can be included); 2) Balance between (weighted) energy demand and (weighted) energy generation (for design phase as normal end users temporal consumption patterns – e.g., for lighting, appliances, etc. – are lacking). Alternatively, a balance based on monthly net values in which only residuals per month are summed up to an annual balance is imaginable. This can be seen either as a load/generation balance or as a special case of import/export balance where a "virtual monthly self-consumption" is assumed (see figure 2 and compare).
- Besides the energy balance, the Net ZEBs can be characterized by their ability to match the building's load by its energy generation (load matching) or to work beneficially with respect to the needs of the local grid infrastructure (grind interaction). Both can be expressed by suitable indicators which are intended as assessment tools only.

== Design and construction ==
The most cost-effective steps toward a reduction in a building's energy consumption usually occur during the design process. To achieve efficient energy use, zero energy design departs significantly from conventional construction practice. Successful zero energy building designers typically combine time tested passive solar, or artificial/fake conditioning, principles that work with the on-site assets. Sunlight and solar heat, prevailing breezes, and the cool of the earth below a building, can provide daylighting and stable indoor temperatures with minimum mechanical means. ZEBs are normally optimized to use passive solar heat gain and shading, combined with thermal mass to stabilize diurnal temperature variations throughout the day, and in most climates are superinsulated. All the technologies needed to create zero energy buildings are available off-the-shelf today.

Sophisticated 3-D building energy simulation tools are available to model how a building will perform with a range of design variables such as building orientation (relative to the daily and seasonal position of the sun), window and door type and placement, overhang depth, insulation type and values of the building elements, air tightness (weatherization), the efficiency of heating, cooling, lighting, and other equipment, as well as local climate. These simulations help the designers predict how the building will perform before it is built, and enable them to model the economic and financial implications on building cost benefit analysis, or even more appropriate – life-cycle assessment.

Zero-energy buildings are built with significant energy-saving features. The heating and cooling loads are lowered by using high-efficiency equipment (such as heat pumps rather than furnaces. Heat pumps are about four times as efficient as furnaces) added insulation (especially in the attic and in the basement of houses), high-efficiency windows (such as low emissivity, triple-glazed windows), draft-proofing, high efficiency appliances (particularly modern high-efficiency refrigerators), high-efficiency LED lighting, passive solar gain in winter and passive shading in the summer, natural ventilation, and other techniques. These features vary depending on climate zones in which the construction occurs. Water heating loads can be lowered by using water conservation fixtures, heat recovery units on waste water, and by using solar water heating, and high-efficiency water heating equipment. In addition, daylighting with skylights or solartubes can provide 100% of daytime illumination within the home. Nighttime illumination is typically done with fluorescent and LED lighting that use 1/3 or less power than incandescent lights, without adding unwanted heat. And miscellaneous electric loads can be lessened by choosing efficient appliances and minimizing phantom loads or standby power. Other techniques to reach net zero (dependent on climate) are Earth sheltered building principles, superinsulation walls using straw-bale construction, pre-fabricated building panels and roof elements plus exterior landscaping for seasonal shading.

Once the energy use of the building has been minimized it can be possible to generate all that energy on site using roof-mounted solar panels. See examples of zero net energy houses here.

Zero-energy buildings are often designed to make dual use of energy including that from white goods. For example, using refrigerator exhaust to heat domestic water, ventilation air and shower drain heat exchangers, office machines and computer servers, and body heat to heat the building. These buildings make use of heat energy that conventional buildings may exhaust outside. They may use heat recovery ventilation, hot water heat recycling, combined heat and power, and absorption chiller units.

== Energy harvest ==
ZEBs harvest available energy to meet their electricity and heating or cooling needs. By far the most common way to harvest energy is to use roof-mounted solar photovoltaic panels that turn the sun's light into electricity. Energy can also be harvested with solar thermal collectors (which use the sun's heat to heat water for the building). Heat pumps can also harvest heat and cool from the air (air-sourced) or ground near the building (ground-sourced otherwise known as geothermal). Technically, heat pumps move heat rather than harvest it, but the overall effect in terms of reduced energy use and reduced carbon footprint is similar. In the case of individual houses, various microgeneration technologies may be used to provide heat and electricity to the building, using solar cells or wind turbines for electricity, and biofuels or solar thermal collectors linked to a seasonal thermal energy storage (STES) for space heating. An STES can also be used for summer cooling by storing the cold of winter underground. To cope with fluctuations in demand, zero energy buildings are frequently connected to the electricity grid, export electricity to the grid when there is a surplus, and drawing electricity when not enough electricity is being produced. Other buildings may be fully autonomous.

Energy harvesting is most often more effective in regards to cost and resource utilization when done on a local but combined scale, for example a group of houses, cohousing, local district or village rather than an individual house basis. An energy benefit of such localized energy harvesting is the virtual elimination of electrical transmission and electricity distribution losses. On-site energy harvesting such as with roof top mounted solar panels eliminates these transmission losses entirely. Energy harvesting in commercial and industrial applications should benefit from the topography of each location. However, a site that is free of shade can generate large amounts of solar powered electricity from the building's roof and almost any site can use geothermal or air-sourced heat pumps. The production of goods under net zero fossil energy consumption requires locations of geothermal, microhydro, solar, and wind resources to sustain the concept.

Zero-energy neighborhoods, such as the BedZED development in the United Kingdom, and those that are spreading rapidly in California and China, may use distributed generation schemes. This may in some cases include district heating, community chilled water, shared wind turbines, etc. There are current plans to use ZEB technologies to build entire off-the-grid or net zero energy use cities.

=== The "energy harvest" versus "energy conservation" debate ===
One of the key areas of debate in zero energy building design is over the balance between energy conservation and the distributed point-of-use harvesting of renewable energy (solar energy, wind energy, and thermal energy). Most zero energy homes use a combination of these strategies.

As a result of significant government subsidies for photovoltaic solar electric systems, wind turbines, etc., there are those who suggest that a ZEB is a conventional house with distributed renewable energy harvesting technologies. Entire additions of such homes have appeared in locations where photovoltaic (PV) subsidies are significant, but many so called "Zero Energy Homes" still have utility bills. This type of energy harvesting without added energy conservation may not be cost effective with the current price of electricity generated with photovoltaic equipment, depending on the local price of power company electricity. One author published the cost, energy and carbon-footprint savings from conservation (e.g., added insulation, triple-glazed windows and heat pumps) compared to those from on-site energy generation (e.g., solar panels) for an upgrade to an existing house.

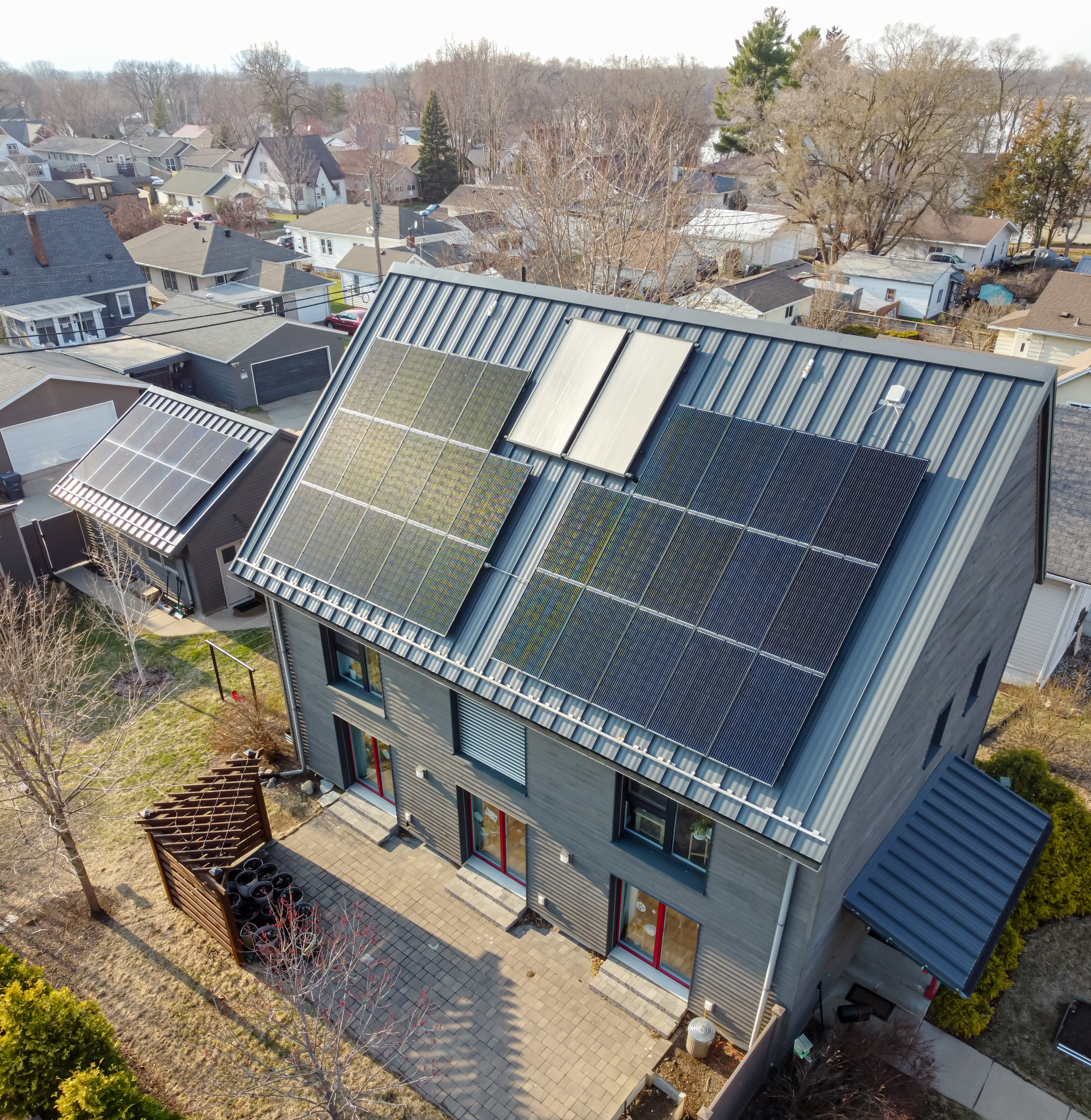
Passive house developed by Western Technical College in La Crosse, Wisconsin

Since the 1980s, passive solar building design and passive house have demonstrated heating energy consumption reductions of 70% to 90% in many locations, without active energy harvesting. For new builds, and with expert design, this can be accomplished with little additional construction cost for materials over a conventional building. Very few industry experts have the skills or experience to fully capture benefits of the passive design. Such passive solar designs are much more cost-effective than adding expensive photovoltaic panels on the roof of a conventional inefficient building. A few kilowatt-hours of photovoltaic panels (costing the equivalent of about US$2–3 dollars per annual kWh production) may only reduce external energy requirements by 15% to 30%. A 29 kWh (100,000 BTU) high seasonal energy efficiency ratio 14 conventional air conditioner requires over 7 kW of photovoltaic electricity while it is operating, and that does not include enough for off-the-grid night-time operation. Passive cooling, and superior system engineering techniques, can reduce the air conditioning requirement by 70% to 90%. Photovoltaic-generated electricity becomes more cost-effective when the overall demand for electricity is lower.

==== Combined approach in rapid retrofits for existing buildings ====
Companies in Germany and the Netherlands offer rapid climate retrofit packages for existing buildings, which add a custom designed shell of insulation to the outside of a building, along with upgrades for more sustainable energy use, such as heat pumps. Similar pilot projects are underway in the US.

=== Occupant behavior ===
The energy used in a building can vary greatly depending on the behavior of its occupants. The acceptance of what is considered comfortable varies widely. Studies of identical homes have shown dramatic differences in energy use in a variety of climates. An average widely accepted ratio of highest to lowest energy consumer in identical homes is about 3, with some identical homes using up to 20 times as much heating energy as the others. Occupant behavior can vary from differences in setting and programming thermostats, varying levels of illumination and hot water use, window and shading system operation and the amount of miscellaneous electric devices or plug loads used.

== Utility concerns ==
Utility companies are typically legally responsible for maintaining the electrical infrastructure that brings power to our cities, neighborhoods, and individual buildings. Utility companies typically own this infrastructure up to the property line of an individual parcel, and in some cases own electrical infrastructure on private land as well.

In the US utilities have expressed concern that the use of Net Metering for ZNE projects threatens the utilities base revenue, which in turn impacts their ability to maintain and service the portion of the electrical grid that they are responsible for. Utilities have expressed concern that states that maintain Net Metering laws may saddle non-ZNE homes with higher utility costs, as those homeowners would be responsible for paying for grid maintenance while ZNE home owners would theoretically pay nothing if they do achieve ZNE status. This creates potential equity issues, as currently, the burden would appear to fall on lower-income households. A possible solution to this issue is to create a minimum base charge for all homes connected to the utility grid, which would force ZNE home owners to pay for grid services independently of their electrical use.

Additional concerns are that local distribution as well as larger transmission grids have not been designed to convey electricity in two directions, which may be necessary as higher levels of distributed energy generation come on line. Overcoming this barrier could require extensive upgrades to the electrical grid, however, as of 2010, this is not believed to be a major problem until renewable generation reaches much higher levels of penetration.

== Development efforts ==
Wide acceptance of zero-energy building technology may require more government incentives or building code regulations, the development of recognized standards, or significant increases in the cost of conventional energy.

The Google photovoltaic campus and the Microsoft 480-kilowatt photovoltaic campus relied on US Federal, and especially California, subsidies and financial incentives. California is now providing US$3.2 billion in subsidies for residential-and-commercial near-zero-energy buildings. The details of other American states' renewable energy subsidies (up to US$5.00 per watt) can be found in the Database of State Incentives for Renewables and Efficiency. The Florida Solar Energy Center has a slide presentation on recent progress in this area.

The World Business Council for Sustainable Development has launched a major initiative to support the development of ZEB. Led by the CEO of United Technologies and the Chairman of Lafarge, the organization has both the support of large global companies and the expertise to mobilize the corporate world and governmental support to make ZEB a reality. Their first report, a survey of key players in real estate and construction, indicates that the costs of building green are overestimated by 300 percent. Survey respondents estimated that greenhouse gas emissions by buildings are 19 percent of the worldwide total, in contrast to the actual value of roughly 40 percent.

=== Influential zero-energy and low-energy buildings ===
The zero-energy building concept has been a progressive evolution from other low-energy building designs. Among these, the Canadian R-2000 and the German passive house standards have been internationally influential. Collaborative government demonstration projects, such as the superinsulated Saskatchewan House, and the International Energy Agency's Task 13, have also played their part.

=== Net zero energy building definition ===
The US National Renewable Energy Laboratory (NREL) published a report called Net-Zero Energy Buildings: A Classification System Based on Renewable Energy Supply Options. This is the first report to lay out a full spectrum classification system for Net Zero/Renewable Energy buildings that includes the full spectrum of Clean Energy sources, both on site and off site. This classification system identifies the following four main categories of Net Zero Energy Buildings/Sites/Campuses:

- NZEB:A – A footprint renewables Net Zero Energy Building
- NZEB:B – A site renewables Net Zero Energy Building
- NZEB:C – An imported renewables Net Zero Energy Building
- NZEB:D – An off-site purchased renewables Net Zero Energy Building

Applying this US Government Net Zero classification system means that every building can become net nero with the right combination of the key net zero technologies – PV (solar), GHP (geothermal heating and cooling, thermal batteries), EE (energy efficiency), sometimes wind, and electric batteries. A graphical exposé of the scale of impact of applying these NREL guidelines for net zero can be seen in the graphic at Net Zero Foundation titled "Net Zero Effect on U.S. Total Energy Use" showing a possible 39% US total fossil fuel use reduction by changing US residential and commercial buildings to net zero, 37% savings if we still use natural gas for cooking at the same level.

=== Net zero carbon conversion example ===
Many universities have professed to want to convert their energy systems off of fossil fuels. Developments in photovoltaics, geothermal heat pump technologies, and the electric battery field have made conversion to a carbon-free energy solution more feasible. Large scale hydroelectric has been around since before 1900. An example of such a project is in the Net Zero Foundation's proposal at MIT to take that campus completely off fossil fuel use. This proposal shows the application of Net Zero Energy Buildings technologies at the District Energy scale.

== Advantages and disadvantages ==
=== Advantages ===
- isolation for building owners from future energy price increases
- increased comfort due to more-uniform interior temperatures (this can be demonstrated with comparative isotherm maps)
- reduced total cost of ownership due to improved energy efficiency
- reduced total net monthly cost of living
- reduced risk of loss from grid blackouts
- Minimal to no future energy price increases for building owners reduced requirement for energy austerity and carbon emission taxes
- improved reliability – photovoltaic systems have 25-year warranties and seldom fail during weather problems – the 1982 photovoltaic systems on the Walt Disney World EPCOT Energy Pavilion were still in use until 2018, even through three hurricanes. They were taken down in 2018 in preparation for a new ride.
- higher resale value as potential owners demand more ZEBs than available supply
- the value of a ZEB building relative to similar conventional building should increase every time energy costs increase
- contribute to the greater benefits of the society, e.g. providing sustainable renewable energy to the grid, reducing the need of grid expansion
- Optimizing bottom-up urban building energy models (UBEM) can make strides in the exactness of reenactment of building vitality.

=== Disadvantages ===
- initial costs can be higher – effort required to understand, apply, and qualify for ZEB subsidies, if they exist.
- very few designers or builders have the necessary skills or experience to build ZEBs
- possible declines in future utility company renewable energy costs may lessen the value of capital invested in energy efficiency
- new photovoltaic solar cells equipment technology price has been falling at roughly 17% per year – It will lessen the value of capital invested in a solar electric generating system – Current subsidies may be phased out as photovoltaic mass production lowers future price
- challenge to recover higher initial costs on resale of building, but new energy rating systems are being introduced gradually.
- while the individual house may use an average of net zero energy over a year, it may demand energy at the time when peak demand for the grid occurs. In such a case, the capacity of the grid must still provide electricity to all loads. Therefore, a ZEB may not reduce risk of loss from grid blackouts.
- without an optimized thermal envelope the embodied energy, heating and cooling energy and resource usage is higher than needed. ZEB by definition do not mandate a minimum heating and cooling performance level thus allowing oversized renewable energy systems to fill the energy gap.
- solar energy capture using the house envelope only works in locations unobstructed from the sun. The solar energy capture cannot be optimized in north (for northern hemisphere, or south for southern Hemisphere) facing shade, or wooded surroundings.
- ZEB is not free of carbon emissions, glass has a high embodied energy, and the production requires a lot of carbon.
- Building regulations such as height restrictions or fire code may prevent implementation of wind or solar power or external additions to an existing thermal envelope.

=== Zero energy building versus green building ===
The goal of green building and sustainable architecture is to use resources more efficiently and reduce a building's negative impact on the environment. Zero energy buildings achieve one key goal of exporting as much renewable energy as it uses over the course of year; reducing greenhouse gas emissions. ZEB goals need to be defined and set, as they are critical to the design process. Zero energy buildings may or may not be considered "green" in all areas, such as reducing waste, using recycled building materials, etc. However, zero energy, or net-zero buildings do tend to have a much lower ecological impact over the life of the building compared with other "green" buildings that require imported energy and/or fossil fuel to be habitable and meet the needs of occupants.

Both terms, zero energy buildings and green buildings, have similarities and differences. "Green" buildings often focus on operational energy, and disregard the embodied carbon footprint from construction. According to the IPCC, embodied carbon will make up half of the total carbon emissions between now[2020] and 2050. On the other hand, zero energy buildings are specifically designed to produce enough energy from renewable energy sources to meet its own consumption requirements, and green buildings can be generally defined as a building that reduces negative impacts or positively impacts our natural environment [1-NEWUSDE]. There are several factors that must be considered before a building is determined to be a green building. Building a green building must include an efficient use of utilities such as water and energy, use of renewable energy, use of recycling and reusing practices to reduce waste, provide proper indoor air quality, use of ethically sourced and non-toxic materials, use of a design that allows the building to adapt to changing environmental climates, and aspects of the design, construction, and operational process that address the environment and quality of life of its occupants. The term green building can also be used to refer to the practice of green building which includes being resource efficient from its design, to its construction, to its operational processes, and ultimately to its deconstruction. The practice of green building differs slightly from zero energy buildings because it considers all environmental impacts such as use of materials and water pollution for example, whereas the scope of zero energy buildings only includes the buildings energy consumption and ability to produce an equal amount, or more, of energy from renewable energy sources.

There are many unforeseen design challenges and site conditions required to efficiently meet the renewable energy needs of a building and its occupants, as much of this technology is new. Designers must apply holistic design principles, and take advantage of the free naturally occurring assets available, such as passive solar orientation, natural ventilation, daylighting, thermal mass, and night time cooling. Designers and engineers must also experiment with new materials and technological advances, striving for more affordable and efficient production. A main issue in recent research regarding challenges and implementation is that there are no common standards or measures for defining and checking "nearly" zero energy performance (D'Agostino & Mazzarella, 2019).

=== Zero energy building versus zero heating building ===
With advances in ultra low U-value glazing a (nearly) zero heating building is proposed to supersede nearly-zero energy buildings in EU. The zero heating building reduces on the passive solar design and makes the building more opened to conventional architectural design. The zero heating building removes the need for seasonal / winter utility power reserve. The annual specific heating demand for the zero-heating house should not exceed 3 kWh/m^{2}a. Zero heating building is simpler to design and to operate. For example: there is no need for modulated sun shading.

==== Certification ====
The two most common certifications for green building are Passive House, and LEED. The goal of Passive House is to be energy efficient and reduce the use of heating/cooling to below standard. LEED certification is more comprehensive in regards to energy use, a building is awarded credits as it demonstrates sustainable practices across a range of categories. Another certification that designates a building as a net zero energy building exists within the requirements of the Living Building Challenge (LBC) called the Net Zero Energy Building (NZEB) certification provided by the International Living Future Institute (ILFI). The designation was developed in November 2011 as the NZEB certification but was then simplified to the Zero Energy Building Certification in 2017. Included in the list of green building certifications, the BCA Green Mark rating system allows for the evaluation of buildings for their performance and impact on the environment

== Worldwide ==
=== International initiatives ===
As a response to global warming and increasing greenhouse gas emissions, countries around the world have been gradually implementing different policies to tackle ZEB. Between 2008 and 2013, researchers from Australia, Austria, Belgium, Canada, Denmark, Finland, France, Germany, Italy, the Republic of Korea, New Zealand, Norway, Portugal, Singapore, Spain, Sweden, Switzerland, the United Kingdom and the US worked together in the joint research program called "Towards Net Zero Energy Solar Buildings". The program was created under the umbrella of International Energy Agency (IEA) Solar Heating and Cooling Program (SHC) Task 40 / Energy in Buildings and Communities (EBC, formerly ECBCS) Annex 52 with the intent of harmonizing international definition frameworks regarding net-zero and very low energy buildings by diving them into subtasks. However, D'Agostino and Mazzarella (2019) note that this directive has been applied inconsistently. Some countries use primary energy consumption as the measure, while others prioritize CO_{2} emissions or renewable energy input. In 2015, the Paris Agreement was created under the United Nations Framework Convention on Climate Change (UNFCC) with the intent of keeping the global temperature rise of the 21st century below 2 degrees Celsius and limiting temperature increase to 1.5 degrees Celsius by limiting greenhouse gas emissions. While there was no enforced compliance, 197 countries signed the international treaty which bound developed countries legally through a mutual cooperation where each party would update its INDC every five years and report annually to the COP. Due to the advantages of energy efficiency and carbon emission reduction, ZEBs are widely being implemented in many different countries as a solution to energy and environmental problems within the infrastructure sector.

In 2024, the European Union (EU) adopted Directive (EU) 2024/1275, on the energy performance of buildings, which aims to achieve a zero-emission building stock across the EU by 2050. The Directive promotes energy-efficient renovations, renewable energy and stricter energy-performance standards. In addition, it requires new public buildings to be zero-emission from 2028 and all new buildings from 2030.

=== Australia ===
National trajectory

In Australia, the Trajectory for Low Energy Buildings and its Addendum were agreed by all Commonwealth, state and territory energy ministers in 2019.

The Trajectory is a national plan that aims to achieve zero energy and carbon-ready commercial and residential buildings in Australia. It is a key initiative to address Australia's 40% energy productivity improvement target by 2030 under the National Energy Productivity Plan.

On 7 July 2023, the Energy and Climate Change Ministerial Council agreed to update the Trajectory for Low Energy Buildings by the end of 2024.

The updates to the Trajectory will:

- support the delivery of a low energy, net zero emissions residential and commercial building sector by 2050
- consider the success of the existing program
- help develop the policy pathway for the building sector to achieve net zero by 2050.

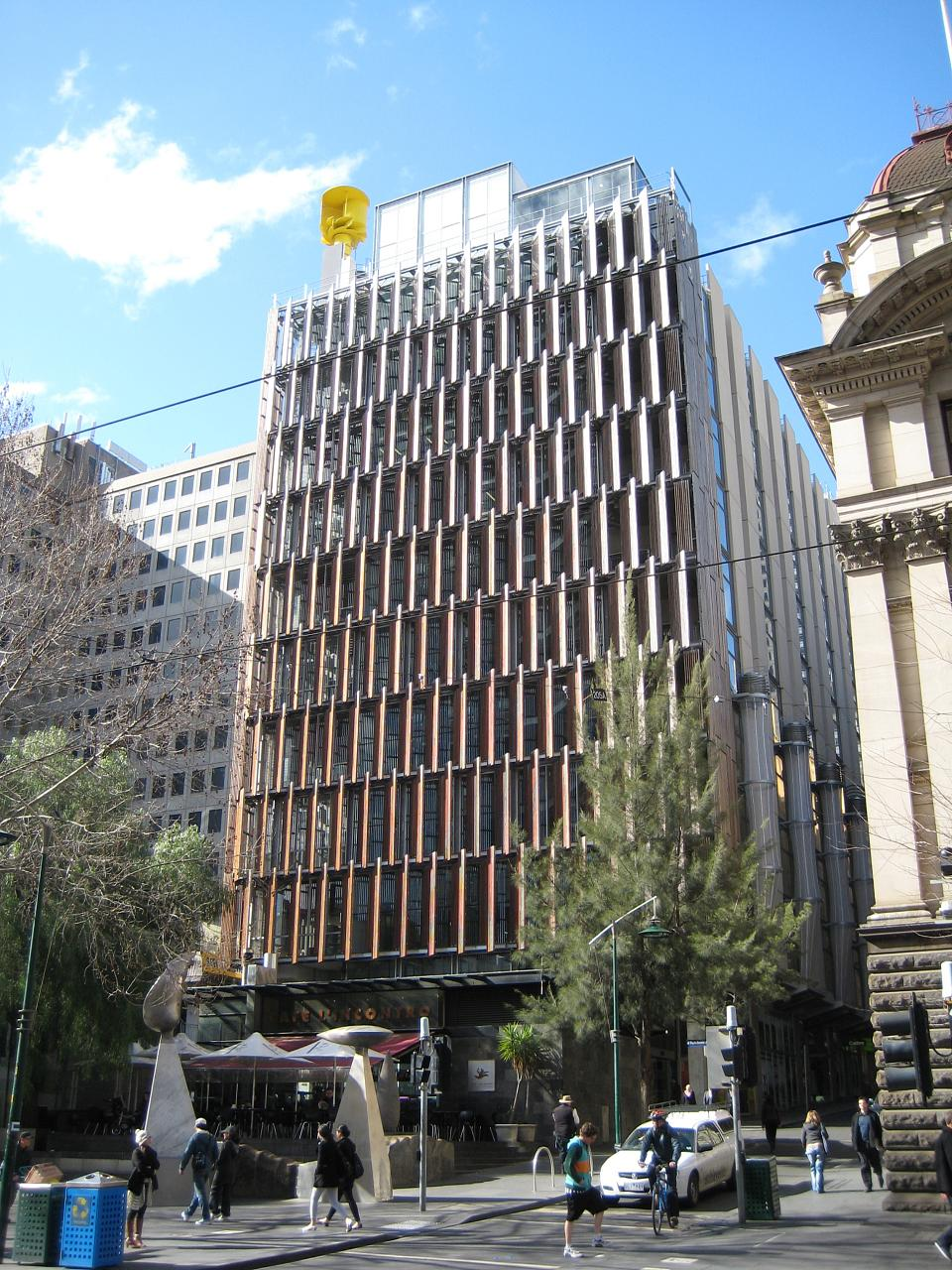
Council House 2

ZEB in Australia

- Council House 2 (CH_{2})Council House 2(also known as CH_{2}), is an office building located at 240 Little Collins Street in the Melbourne central business district, Australia. It is used by the City of Melbourne council, and in April 2005, became the first purpose-built office building in Australia to achieve a maximum Six Green Star rating.

=== Belgium ===
In Belgium there is a project with the ambition to make the Belgian city Leuven climate-neutral in 2030. The region of Wallonia introduced its Q-ZEN standard in January 2021, requiring new buildings to meet strict energy-performance and insulation criteria. From January 2026 new buildings must obtain at least 35% of annual primary energy consumption from renewables.

=== Brazil ===
In Brazil, the Ordinance No. 42, of February 24, 2021, approved the Inmetro Normative Instruction for the Classification of Energy Efficiency of Commercial, Service and Public Buildings (INI-C), which improves the Technical Quality Requirements for the Energy Efficiency Level of Commercial, Service and Public Buildings (RTQ-C), specifying the criteria and methods for classifying commercial, service and public buildings as to their energy efficiency. Annex D presents the procedures for determining the potential for local renewable energy generation and the assessment conditions for Near Zero Energy Buildings (NZEBs) and Positive Energy Buildings (PEBs).

=== Canada ===
- The Canadian Home Builders Association – National oversees the Net Zero Homes certification label, a voluntary industry-led labeling initiative.
- In December 2017, the BC Energy Step Code entered into legal force in British Columbia. Local British Columbia governments may use the standard to incentivize or require a level of energy efficiency in new construction that goes above and beyond the requirements of the base building code. The regulation is designed as a technical roadmap to help the province reach its target that all new buildings will attain a net zero energy ready level of performance by 2032.
- In August 2017, the Government of Canada released Build Smart – Canada's Buildings Strategy, as a key driver of the Pan Canadian Framework on Clean Growth and Climate Change, Canada's national climate strategy. The Build Smart strategy seeks to dramatically increase the energy efficiency of Canadian buildings in pursuit of a net zero energy ready level of performance.
- In Canada the Net-Zero Energy Home Coalition is an industry association promoting net-zero energy home construction and the adoption of a near net-zero energy home (nNZEH), NZEH Ready and NZEH standard.
- The Canada Mortgage and Housing Corporation is sponsoring the EQuilibrium Sustainable Housing Competition that will see the completion of fifteen zero-energy and near-zero-energy demonstration projects across the country starting in 2008.
- The EcoTerra House in Eastman, Quebec is Canada's first nearly net-zero energy housing built through the CMHC EQuilibrium Sustainable Housing Competition. The house was designed by Assoc. Prof. Dr. Masa Noguchi of the University of Melbourne for Alouette Homes and engineered by Prof. Dr. Andreas K. Athienitis of Concordia University.
- In 2014, the public library building in Varennes, QC, became the first ZNE institutional building in Canada. The library is also LEED gold certified.
- The EcoPlusHome in Bathurst, New Brunswick. The Eco Plus Home is a prefabricated test house built by Maple Leaf Homes and with technology from Bosch Thermotechnology.
- Mohawk College will be building Hamilton's first net Zero Building

=== China ===
With an estimated population of 1,439,323,776 people, China has become one of the world's leading contributor to greenhouse gas emissions due to its ongoing rapid urbanization. Even with the growing increase in building infrastructure, China has long been considered as a country where the overall energy demand has consistently grown less rapidly than the gross domestic product (GDP) of China. Since the late 1970s, China has been using half as much energy as it did in 1997, but due to its dense population and rapid growth of infrastructure, China has become the world's second largest energy consumer and is in a position to become the leading contributor to greenhouse gas emissions in the next century.

Since 2010, Chinese government has been driven by the release of new national policies to increase ZEB design standards and has also laid out a series of incentives to increase ZEB projects in China. In November 2015, China's Ministry of Housing and Urban-Rural Development (MOHURD) released a technical guide regarding passive and low energy green residential buildings. This guide was aimed at improving energy efficiency in China's infrastructure and was also the first of its kind to be formally released as a guide for energy efficiency. Also, with rapid growth in ZEBs in the last three years, there is an estimated influx of ZEBs to be built in China by 2020 along with the existing ZEB projects that are already built.

As a response to the Paris Agreement in 2015, China stated that it set a target of reducing peak carbon emissions around 2030 while also aiming to lower carbon dioxide emissions by 60-65 percent from 2005 emissions per unit of GDP. In 2020, Chinese Communist Party leader Xi Jinping released a statement in his address to the UN General Assembly declaring that China would be carbon neutral by 2060 pushing forward climate change reforms. With more than 95 percent of China's energy originating from fuel sources that emit carbon dioxide, carbon neutrality in China will require an almost complete transition to fuel sources such as solar power, wind, hydro, or nuclear power. In order to achieve carbon neutrality, China's proposed energy quota policy will have to incorporate new monitoring and mechanisms that ensure accurate measurements of energy performance of buildings. Future research should investigate the different possible challenges that could come up due to implementation of ZEB policies in China.

==== Net-zero energy projects in China ====
- One of the new generation net-zero energy office buildings successfully constructed is the 71-story Pearl River Tower located in Guangzhou, China. Designed by Skidmore Owings Merrill LLP, the tower was designed with the idea that the building would generate the same amount of energy used on an annual basis while also following the four steps to net zero energy: reduction, absorption, reclamation, and generation. While initial plans for the Pearl River Tower included natural gas-fired microturbines used for generation electricity, photovoltaic panels integrated into the glazed roof and shading louvers and tactical building design in combination with the VAWT's electricity generation were chosen instead due to local regulations.

=== Denmark ===
Strategic Research Centre on Zero Energy Buildings was in 2009 established at Aalborg University by a grant from the Danish Council for Strategic Research (DSF), the Programme Commission for Sustainable Energy and Environment, and in cooperation with the Technical University of Denmark, Danish Technological Institute, The Danish Construction Association and some private companies. The purpose of the centre is through development of integrated, intelligent technologies for the buildings, which ensure considerable energy conservation and optimal application of renewable energy, to develop zero energy building concepts. In cooperation with the industry, the centre will create the necessary basis for a long-term sustainable development in the building sector.

=== Germany ===
- Technische Universität Darmstadt won first place in the international zero energy design 2007 Solar Decathlon competition, with a passivhaus design (Passive house) + renewables, scoring highest in the Architecture, Lighting, and Engineering contests
- Fraunhofer Institute for Solar Energy Systems ISE, Freiburg im Breisgau
- Net zero energy, energy-plus or climate-neutral buildings in the next generation of electricity grids

=== India ===
India's first net zero building is Indira Paryavaran Bhawan, located in New Delhi, inaugurated in 2014. Features include passive solar building design and other green technologies. High-efficiency solar panels are proposed. It cools air from toilet exhaust using a thermal wheel in order to reduce load on its chiller system. It has many water conservation features.

=== Iran ===
In 2011, Payesh Energy House (PEH) or Khaneh Payesh Niroo by a collaboration of Fajr-e-Toseah Consultant Engineering Company and Vancouver Green Homes Ltd] under management of Payesh Energy Group (EPG) launched the first Net-Zero passive house in Iran. This concept makes the design and construction of PEH a sample model and standardized process for mass production by MAPSA.

Also, an example of the new generation of zero energy office buildings is the 24-story OIIC Office Tower, which is started in 2011, as the OIIC Company headquarters. It uses both modest energy efficiency, and a big distributed renewable energy generation from both solar and wind. It is managed by Rahgostar Naft Company in Tehran, Iran. The tower is receiving economic support from government subsidies that are now funding many significant fossil-fuel-free efforts.

=== Ireland ===
In 2005, a private company launched the world's first standardised passive house in Ireland, this concept makes the design and construction of passive house a standardised process. Conventional low energy construction techniques have been refined and modelled on the PHPP (Passive House Design Package) to create the standardised passive house. Building offsite allows high precision techniques to be utilised and reduces the possibility of errors in construction.

In 2009 the same company started a project to use 23,000 liters of water in a seasonal storage tank, heated up by evacuated solar tubes throughout the year, with the aim to provide the house with enough heat throughout the winter months thus eliminating the need for any electrical heat to keep the house comfortably warm. The system is monitored and documented by a research team from The University of Ulster and the results will be included in part of a PhD thesis.

In 2012 Cork Institute of Technology started renovation work on its 1974 building stock to develop a net zero energy building retrofit. The exemplar project will become Ireland's first zero energy testbed offering a post-occupancy evaluation of actual building performance against design benchmarks.

=== Jamaica ===
The first zero energy building in Jamaica and the Caribbean opened at the Mona Campus of the University of the West Indies (UWI) in 2017. The 2300 square foot building was designed to inspire more sustainable and energy efficient buildings in the area.

=== Japan ===
After the April 2011 Fukushima earthquake followed by the up with Fukushima Daiichi nuclear disaster, Japan experienced severe power crisis that led to the awareness of the importance of energy conservation.

In 2012 Ministry of Economy, Trade and Industry, Ministry of Land, Infrastructure, Transport and Tourism and Ministry of the Environment (Japan) summarized the road map for Low-carbon Society which contains the goal of ZEH and ZEB to be standard of new construction in 2020.

The Mitsubishi Electric Corporation is underway with the construction of Japan's first zero energy office building, set to be completed in October, 2020 (as of September 2020). The SUSTIE ZEB test facility is located in Kamakura, Japan, to develop ZEB technology. With the net zero certification, the facility projects to reduce energy consumption by 103%.

Japan has made it a goal that all new houses be net zero energy by 2030. The developing company Sekisui House introduced their first net zero home in 2013, and is now planning Japan's first zero energy condominium in Nagoya City, it is a three-story building with 12 units. There are solar panels on the roof and fuel cells for each unit to provide backup power.

=== Korea (Republic of) ===
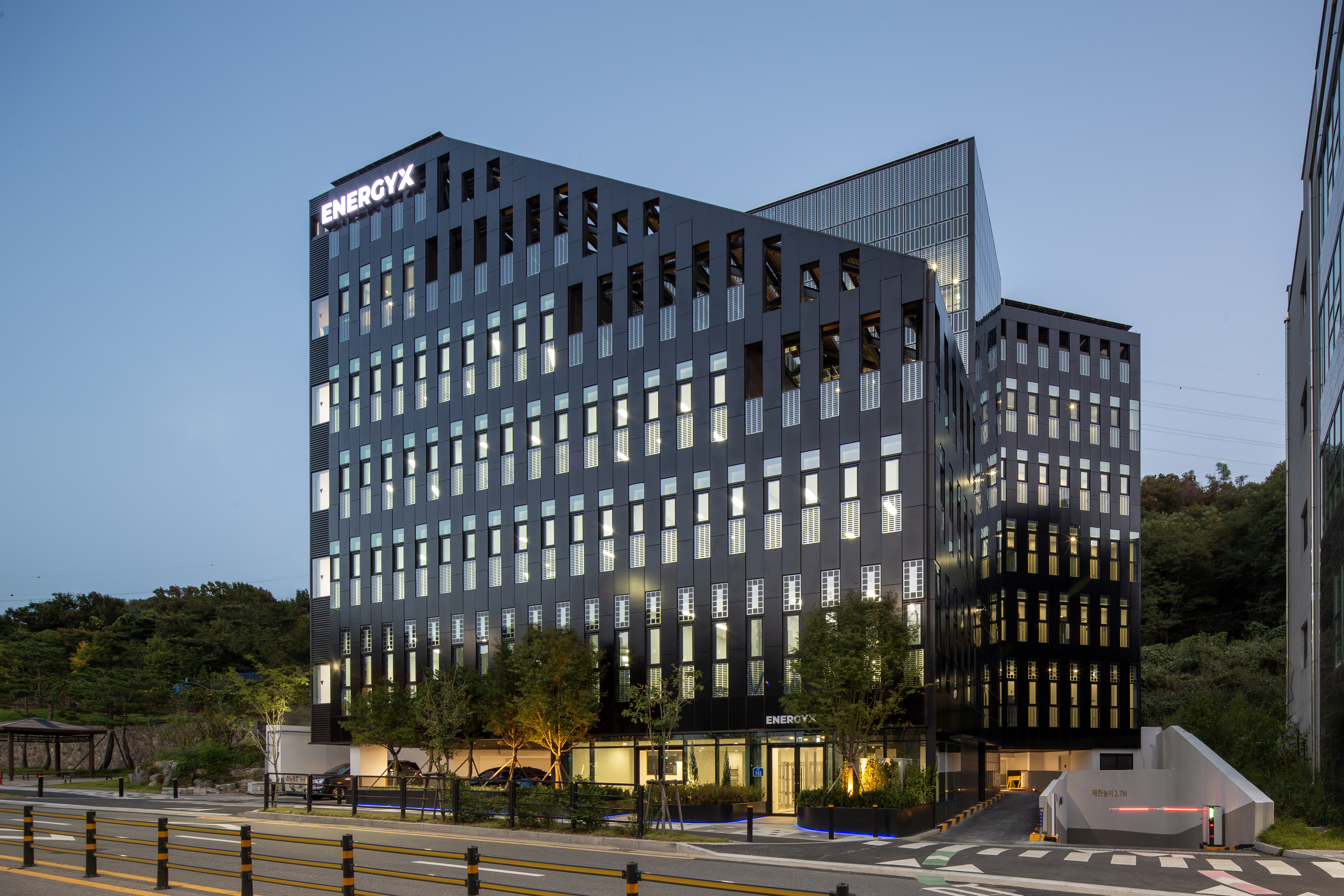
EnergyX DY-Building (에너지엑스 DY빌딩), the first commercial Net-Zero Energy Building (NZEB, or ZEB grade 1) and the first Plus Energy Building (+ZEB, or ZEB grade plus) in Korea, was opened and introduced in 2023.

South Korea's Mandatory ZEB requirements, which have been previously applied to buildings with a GFA of 1,000 m2+ in 2021 will expand to buildings with a GFA of 500 m2+ in 2022, until being applicable to all public buildings starting in 2024. For private buildings, ZEB certification will be mandated for building permits with a GFA of over 100,000 m2 from 2023. After 2025, zero-energy construction for private buildings will be expanded to GFAs over 1,000 m2. The goal of the policy is to convert all public sector buildings to ZEB grade 3 (an energy independence rate of 60% ~ 80%), and all private buildings to ZEB grade 5 (an energy independence rate of 20% ~ 40%) by 2030.

EnergyX DY-Building (에너지엑스 DY빌딩), the first commercial Net-Zero Energy Building (NZEB, or ZEB grade 1) and the first Plus Energy Building (+ZEB, or ZEB grade plus) in Korea was opened and introduced in 2023. The energy technology and sustainable architectural platform company EnergyX developed, designed, and engineered the building with its proprietary technologies and services. EnergyX DY-Building received the ZEB certification with an energy independence rate (or energy self-sufficiency rate) of 121.7%.

=== Malaysia ===
In October 2007, the Malaysia Energy Centre (PTM) successfully completed the development and construction of the PTM Zero Energy Office (ZEO) Building. The building has been designed to be a super-energy-efficient building using only 286 kWh/day. The renewable energy – photovoltaic combination is expected to result in a net zero energy requirement from the grid. The building is currently undergoing a fine tuning process by the local energy management team. Findings are expected to be published in a year.

In 2016, the Sustainable Energy Development Authority Malaysia (SEDA Malaysia) started a voluntary initiative called Low Carbon Building Facilitation Program. The purpose is to support the current low carbon cities program in Malaysia. Under the program, several project demonstration managed to reduce energy and carbon beyond 50% savings and some managed to save more than 75%. Continuous improvement of super energy efficient buildings with significant implementation of on-site renewable energy managed to make a few of them become nearly Zero Energy (nZEB) as well as Net-Zero Energy Building (NZEB). In March 2018, SEDA Malaysia has started the Zero Energy Building Facilitation Program.

Malaysia also has its own sustainable building tool special for Low Carbon and zero energy building, called GreenPASS that been developed by the Construction Industry Development Board Malaysia (CIDB) in 2012, and currently being administered and promoted by SEDA Malaysia. GreenPASS official is called the Construction Industry Standard (CIS) 20:2012.

=== Netherlands ===
In September 2006, the Dutch headquarters of the World Wildlife Fund (WWF) in Zeist was opened. This earth-friendly building gives back more energy than it uses. All materials in the building were tested against strict requirements laid down by the WWF and the architect.

=== Norway ===
In February 2009, the Research Council of Norway assigned The Faculty of Architecture and Fine Art at the Norwegian University of Science and Technology to host the Research Centre on Zero Emission Buildings (ZEB), which is one of eight new national Centres for Environment-friendly Energy Research (FME). The main objective of the FME-centres is to contribute to the development of good technologies for environmentally friendly energy and to raise the level of Norwegian expertise in this area. In addition, they should help to generate new industrial activity and new jobs. Over the next eight years, the FME-Centre ZEB will develop competitive products and solutions for existing and new buildings that will lead to market penetration of zero emission buildings related to their production, operation and demolition.

=== Singapore ===
Singapore unveiled a prominent development at the National University of Singapore that is a net-zero energy building. The building, called SDE4, is located within a group of three buildings in its School of Design and Environment (SDE). The design of the building achieved a Green Mark Platinum certification as it produces as much energy as it consumes with its solar panel covered rooftop and hybrid cooling system along with many integrated systems to achieve optimum energy efficiency. This development was the first new-build zero-energy building to come to fruition in Singapore, and the first zero-energy building at the NUS. The first retrofitted zero energy building to be developed in Singapore was a building at the Building and Construction Authority (BCA) academy by the Minister for National Development Mah Bow Tan at the inaugural Singapore Green Building Week on October 26, 2009. Singapore's Green Building Week (SGBW) promotes sustainable development and celebrates the achievements of successfully designed sustainable buildings.

A net-zero energy building unveiled more recently is the SMU Connexion (SMUC). It is the first net-zero energy building in the city that also utilizes mass engineered timber (MET). It is designed to meet the Building and Construction Authority (BCA) Green Mark Platinum certification and has been in operation since January 2020.

=== Switzerland ===
The Swiss MINERGIE-A-Eco label certifies zero energy buildings. The first building with this label, a single-family home, was completed in Mühleberg in 2011.

=== United Arab Emirates ===
- Masdar City in Abu Dhabi
- Dubai The Sustainable City in Dubai

=== United Kingdom ===
In December 2006, the government announced that by 2016 all new homes in England will be zero energy buildings. To encourage this, an exemption from Stamp Duty Land Tax is planned. In Wales the plan is for the standard to be met earlier in 2011, although it is looking more likely that the actual implementation date will be 2012. However, as a result of a unilateral change of policy published at the time of the March 2011 budget, a more limited policy is now planned which, it is estimated, will only mitigate two thirds of the emissions of a new home.

- BedZED development
- Hockerton Housing Project

In January 2019 the Ministry of Housing Communities and Local Government simply defined 'Zero Energy' as 'just meets current building standards' neatly solving this problem.

=== United States ===
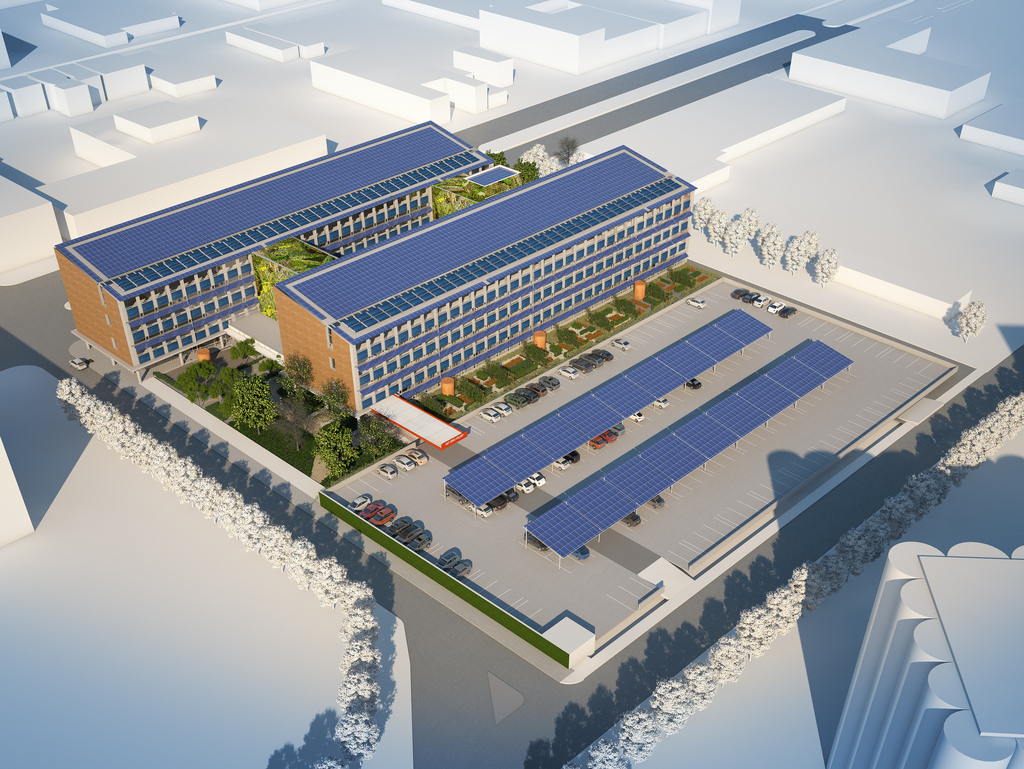
Figure 3: Net Zero Court zero emissions office building prototype in St. Louis, Missouri

In the US, ZEB research is currently being supported by the US Department of Energy (DOE) Building America Program, including industry-based consortia and researcher organizations at the National Renewable Energy Laboratory (NREL), the Florida Solar Energy Center (FSEC), Lawrence Berkeley National Laboratory (LBNL), and Oak Ridge National Laboratory (ORNL). From fiscal year 2008 to 2012, DOE plans to award $40 million to four Building America teams, the Building Science Corporation; IBACOS; the Consortium of Advanced Residential Buildings; and the Building Industry Research Alliance, as well as a consortium of academic and building industry leaders. The funds will be used to develop net-zero-energy homes that consume 50% to 70% less energy than conventional homes.

DOE is also awarding $4.1 million to two regional building technology application centers that will accelerate the adoption of new and developing energy-efficient technologies. The two centers, located at the University of Central Florida and Washington State University, will serve 17 states, providing information and training on commercially available energy-efficient technologies.

The U.S. Energy Independence and Security Act of 2007 created 2008 through 2012 funding for a new solar air conditioning research and development program, which should soon demonstrate multiple new technology innovations and mass production economies of scale.

The 2008 Solar America Initiative funded research and development into future development of cost-effective Zero Energy Homes in the amount of $148 million in 2008.

The Solar Energy Tax Credits were extended until the end of 2016.

By Executive Order 13514, U.S. President Barack Obama mandated that by 2015, 15% of existing Federal buildings conform to new energy efficiency standards and 100% of all new Federal buildings be Zero-Net-Energy by 2030.

==== Energy Free Home Challenge ====
In 2007, the philanthropic Siebel Foundation created the Energy Free Home Foundation. The goal was to offer $20 million in global incentive prizes to design and build a 2,000 square foot (186 square meter) three-bedroom, two bathroom home with (1) net-zero annual utility bills that also has (2) high market appeal, and (3) costs no more than a conventional home to construct.

The plan included funding to build the top ten entries at $250,000 each, a $10 million first prize, and then a total of 100 such homes to be built and sold to the public.

Beginning in 2009, Thomas Siebel made many presentations about his Energy Free Home Challenge. The Siebel Foundation Report stated that the Energy Free Home Challenge was "Launching in late 2009".

The Lawrence Berkeley National Laboratory at the University of California, Berkeley participated in writing the "Feasibility of Achieving Zero-Net-Energy, Zero-Net-Cost Homes" for the $20-million Energy Free Home Challenge.

If implemented, the Energy Free Home Challenge would have provided increased incentives for improved technology and consumer education about zero energy buildings coming in at the same cost as conventional housing.

==== US Department of Energy Solar Decathlon ====
The US Department of Energy Solar Decathlon is an international competition that challenges collegiate teams to design, build, and operate the most attractive, effective, and energy-efficient solar-powered house. Achieving zero net energy balance is a major focus of the competition.

==== States ====
===== Arizona =====
- Zero Energy House developed by the NAHB Research Center and John Wesley Miller Companies, Tucson.

===== California =====
- The State of California has proposed that all new low- and mid-rise residential buildings, and all new commercial buildings, be designed and constructed to ZNE standards beginning in 2020 and 2030, respectively. The requirements, if implemented, will be promulgated via the California Building Code, which is updated on a three-year cycle and which currently mandates some of the highest energy efficiency standards in the United States. California is anticipated to further increase efficiency requirements by 2020, thus avoiding the trends discussed above of building standard housing and achieving ZNE by adding large amounts of renewables. The California Energy Commission is required to perform a cost-benefit analysis to prove that new regulations create a net benefit for residents of the state.
- West Village, located on the University of California campus in Davis, California, was the largest ZNE-planned community in North America at the time of its opening in 2014. The development contains student housing for approximately 1,980 UC Davis students as well as leasable office space and community amenities including a community center, pool, gym, restaurant and convenience store. Office spaces in the development are currently leased by energy and transportation-related University programs. The project was a public-private partnership between the university and West Village Community Partnership LLC, led by Carmel Partners of San Francisco, a private developer, who entered into a 60-year ground lease with the university and was responsible for the design, construction, and implementation of the $300 million project, which is intended to be market-rate housing for Davis. This is unique as the developer designed the project to achieve ZNE at no added cost to themselves or to the residents. Designed and modeled to achieve ZNE, the project uses a mixture of passive elements (roof overhangs, well-insulated walls, radiant heat barriers, ducts in insulated spaces, etc.) as well as active approaches (occupancy sensors on lights, high-efficiency appliances and lighting, etc.). Designed to out-perform California's 2008 Title 24 energy codes by 50%, the project produced 87% of the energy it consumed during its first year in operation. The shortcoming in ZNE status is attributed to several factors, including improperly functioning heat pump water heaters, which have since been fixed. Occupant behavior is significantly different from that anticipated, with the all-student population using more energy on a per-capita basis than typical inhabitants of single-family homes in the area. One of the primary factors driving increased energy use appears to be the increased miscellaneous electrical loads (MEL, or plug loads) in the form of mini-refrigerators, lights, computers, gaming consoles, televisions, and other electronic equipment. The university continues to work with the developer to identify strategies for achieving ZNE status. These approaches include incentivizing occupant behavior and increasing the site's renewable energy capacity, which is a 4 MW photovoltaic array per the original design. The West Village site is also home to the Honda Smart Home US, a beyond-ZNE single-family home that incorporates cutting-edge technologies in energy management, lighting, construction, and water efficiency.
- The IDeAs Z2 Design Facility is a net zero energy, zero carbon retrofit project occupied since 2007. It uses less than one fourth the energy of a typical U.S. office by applying strategies such as daylighting, radiant heating/cooling with a ground-source heat pump and high energy performance lighting and computing. The remaining energy demand is met with renewable energy from its building-integrated photovoltaic array. In 2009, building owner and occupant Integrated Design Associates (IDeAs) recorded actual measured energy use intensity of 21.17 thousand British thermal units per square foot (66.8 kWh/m^{2}) per year, with 21.72 thousand British thermal units per square foot (68.5 kWh/m^{2}) per year produced, for a net of −0.55 thousand British thermal units per square foot (−1.7 kWh/m^{2}) per year. The building is also carbon neutral, with no gas connection, and with carbon offsets purchased to cover the embodied carbon of the building materials used in the renovation.
- The Zero Net Energy Center, scheduled to open in 2013 in San Leandro, is to be a 46,000-square-foot electrician training facility created by the International Brotherhood of Electrical Workers Local 595 and the Northern California chapter of the National Electrical Contractors Association. Training will include energy-efficient construction methods.
- The Green Idea House is a net zero energy, zero-carbon retrofit in Hermosa Beach.
- George LeyVa Middle School Administrative Offices, occupied since fall 2011, is a net zero energy, net zero carbon emissions building of just over 9,000 square feet. With daylighting, variable refrigerant flow HVAC, and displacement ventilation, it is designed to use half of the energy of a conventional California school building, and, through a building-integrated solar array, provides 108% of the energy needed to offset its annual electricity use. The excess helps power the remainder of the middle school campus. It is the first publicly funded NZE K–12 building in California.
- The Stevens Library at Sacred Heart Schools in California is the first net-zero library in the United States, receiving Net Zero Energy Building status from the International Living Future Institute, part of the PG&E Zero Net Energy Pilot Project.
- The Santa Monica City Services Building is among the first net-zero energy, net-zero water public/municipal buildings in California. Completed in 2020, the 50,000-square-foot addition to the historic Santa Monica City Hall building was designed to provide its own energy and water, and to minimize energy use through efficient building systems.
- At 402,000 square-feet, the California Air Resources Board Southern California Headquarters – Mary D. Nichols Campus, is the largest net-zero energy facility in the United States. A photovoltaic system covers 204,903 square-feet between the facility rooftop and parking pavilions. The +3.5 megawatt system is anticipated to generate roughly 6,235,000 kWh reusable energy per year. The facility was dedicated on November 18, 2021.

===== Colorado =====
- The Moore House achieves net-zero energy usage with passive solar design, 'tuned' heat reflective windows, super-insulated and air-tight construction, natural daylighting, solar thermal panels for hot water and space heating, a photovoltaic (PV) system that generates more carbon-free electricity than the house requires, and an energy-recovery ventilator (ERV) for fresh air. The green building strategies used on the Moore House earned it a verified home energy rating system (HERS) score of −3.
- The NREL Research Support Facility in Golden is a class A office building. Its energy efficiency features include: Thermal storage concrete structure, transpired solar collectors, 70 miles of radiant piping, high-efficiency office equipment, and an energy-efficient data center that reduces the data center's energy use by 50% over traditional approaches.
- Wayne Aspinall Federal Building in Grand Junction, originally constructed in 1918, became the first Net Zero Energy building listed on the National Register of Historic Places. On-site renewable energy generation is intended to produce 100% of the building's energy throughout the year using the following energy efficiency features: Variable refrigerant flow for the HVAC, a geo-exchange system, advanced metering and building controls, high-efficient lighting systems, thermally enhanced building envelope, interior window system (to maintain historic windows), and advanced power strips (APS) with individual occupancy sensors.
- Tutt Library at Colorado College was renovated to be a net-zero library in 2017, making it the largest ZNE academic library. It received an Innovation Award from the National Association of college and University Business Officers.

===== Florida =====
- The 1999 side-by-side Florida Solar Energy Center Lakeland demonstration project was called the "Zero Energy Home". It was a first-generation university effort that significantly influenced the creation of the U.S. Department of Energy, Energy Efficiency and Renewable Energy, Zero Energy Home program.

===== Illinois =====
- The Walgreens store located on 741 Chicago Ave, Evanston, is the first of the company's stores to be built and or converted to a net zero energy building. It is the first net zero energy retail stores to be built and will pave the way to renovating and building net zero energy retail stores in the near future. The Walgreens store includes the following energy efficiency features: Geo-exchange system, energy-efficient building materials, LED lighting and daylight harvesting, and carbon dioxide refrigerant.
- The Electrical and Computer Engineering building at the University of Illinois at Urbana-Champaign, which was built in 2014, is a net zero building.

===== Iowa =====
- The MUM Sustainable Living Center was designed to surpass LEED Platinum qualification. The Maharishi University of Management (MUM) in Fairfield, Iowa, founded by Maharishi Mahesh Yogi (best known for having brought Transcendental Meditation to the West) incorporates principles of Bau Biology (a German system that focuses on creating a healthy indoor environment), as well as Maharishi Vedic Architecture (an Indian system of architecture focused on the precise orientation, proportions and placement of rooms). The building is one of the few in the country to qualify as net zero, and one of even fewer that can claim the banner of grid positive via its solar power system. A rainwater catchment system and on-site natural waste-water treatment likewise take the building off (sewer) grid with respect to water and waste treatment. Additional green features include natural daylighting in every room, natural and breathable earth block walls (made by the program's students), purified rainwater for both potable and non-potable functions; and an on-site water purification and recycling system consisting of plants, algae, and bacteria.

===== Kentucky =====
- Richardsville Elementary School, part of the Warren County Public School District in south-central Kentucky, is the first Net Zero energy school in the United States. To reach Net Zero, innovative energy reduction strategies were used by CMTA Consulting Engineers and Sherman Carter Barnhart Architects including dedicated outdoor air systems (DOAS) with dynamic reset, new IT systems, alternative methods to prepare lunches, and the use of solar photovoltaics. The project has an efficient thermal envelope constructed with insulated concrete form (ICF) walls, geothermal water source heat pumps, low-flow fixtures, and features daylighting extensively throughout. It is also the first truly wireless school in Kentucky.
- Locust Trace AgriScience Center, an agricultural-based vocational school serving Fayette County Public Schools and surrounding districts, features a Net Zero Academic Building engineered by CMTA Consulting Engineers and designed by Tate Hill Jacobs Architects. The facility, located in Lexington, Kentucky, also has a greenhouse, riding arena with stalls, and a barn. To reach Net Zero in the Academic Building the project utilizes an air-tight envelope, expanded indoor temperature setpoints in specified areas to more closely model real-world conditions, a solar thermal system, and geothermal water source heat pumps. The school has further reduced its site impact by minimizing municipal water use through the use of a dual system consisting of a standard leach field system and a constructed wetlands system and using pervious surfaces to collect, drain, and use rainwater for crop irrigation and animal watering.

===== Massachusetts =====
- The government of Cambridge has enacted a plan for "net zero" carbon emissions from all buildings in the city by 2040.
- John W. Olver Transit Center, designed by Charles Rose Architects Inc, is an intermodal transit hub in Greenfield, Massachusetts. Built with American Recovery and Reinvestment Act funds, the facility was constructed with solar panels, geothermal wells, copper heat screens and other energy efficient technologies.

===== Michigan =====
- The Mission Zero House is the 110-year-old Ann Arbor home of Greenovation.TV host and Environment Report contributor Matthew Grocoff. As of 2011, the home is the oldest home in America to achieve net-zero energy. The owners are chronicling their project on Greenovation.TV and The Environment Report on public radio.
- The Vineyard Project is a Zero Energy Home (ZEH) thanks to the Passive Solar Design, 3.3 Kws of Photovoltaics, Solar Hot Water and Geothermal Heating and Cooling. The home is pre-wired for a future wind turbine and only uses 600 kWh of energy per month while a minimum of 20 kWh of electricity per day with many days net-metering backwards. The project also used ICF insulation throughout the entire house and is certified as Platinum under the LEED for Homes certification. This Project was awarded Green Builder Magazine Home of the Year 2009.
- The Lenawee Center for a Sustainable Future, a new campus for Lenawee Intermediate School District, serves as a living laboratory for the future of agriculture. It is the first Net Zero education building in Michigan, engineered by CMTA Consulting Engineers and designed by The Collaborative, Inc. The project includes solar arrays on the ground as well as the roof, a geothermal heating and cooling system, solar tubes, permeable pavement and sidewalks, a sedum green roof, and an overhang design to regulate building temperature.

===== Missouri =====
- In 2010, architectural firm HOK worked with energy and daylighting consultant The Weidt Group to design a 170,735-square-foot (15,861.8 m^{2}) net zero carbon emissions Class A office building prototype in St. Louis, Missouri. The team chronicled its process and results on Netzerocourt.com.

===== New Jersey =====
- The 31 Tannery Project, located in Branchburg, New Jersey, serves as the corporate headquarters for Ferreira Construction, the Ferreira Group, and Noveda Technologies. The 42,000-square-foot (3,900 m^{2}) office and shop building was constructed in 2006 and is the first building in the state of New Jersey to meet New Jersey's Executive Order 54. The building is also the first Net Zero Electric Commercial Building in the United States.

===== New York =====
- Green Acres, the first true zero-net energy development in America, is located in New Paltz, about 80 miles (130 km) north of New York City. Greenhill Contracting began construction on this development of 25 single family homes in summer 2008, with designs by BOLDER Architecture. After a full year of occupancy, from March 2009 to March 2010, the solar panels of the first occupied home in Green Acres generated 1490 kWh more energy than the home consumed. The second occupied home has also achieved zero-net energy use. As of June 2011, five houses have been completed, purchased and occupied, two are under construction, and several more are being planned. The homes are built of insulated concrete forms with spray foam insulated rafters and triple pane casement windows, heated and cooled by a geothermal system, to create extremely energy-efficient and long-lasting buildings. The heat recovery ventilator provides constant fresh air and, with low or no VOC (volatile organic compound) materials, these homes are very healthy to live in. To the best of our knowledge, Green Acres is the first development of multiple buildings, residential or commercial, that achieves true zero-net energy use in the United States, and the first zero-net energy development of single family homes in the world.
- Greenhill Contracting has built two luxury zero-net energy homes in Esopus, completed in 2008. One house was the first Energy Star rated zero-net energy home in the Northeast and the first registered zero-net energy home on the US Department of Energy's Builder's Challenge website. These homes were the template for Green Acres and the other zero-net energy homes that Greenhill Contracting has built, in terms of methods and materials.
- The headquarters of Hudson Solar, a dba of Hudson Valley Clean Energy, Inc., located in Rhinebeck and completed in 2007, was determined by NESEA (the Northeast Sustainable Energy Association) to have become the first proven zero-net energy commercial building in New York State and the ten northeast United States (October 2008). The building consumes less energy than it generates, using a solar electric system to generate power from the sun, geothermal heating and cooling, and solar thermal collectors to heat all its hot water.

===== Oklahoma =====
- The first 5,000-square-foot (460 m^{2}) zero-energy design home was built in 1979 with support from President Carter's new United States Department of Energy. It relied heavily on passive solar building design for space heat, water heat and space cooling. It heated and cooled itself effectively in a climate where the summer peak temperature was 110 degrees Fahrenheit, and the winter low temperature was −10 F. It did not use active solar systems. It is a double envelope house that uses a gravity-fed natural convection air flow design to circulate passive solar heat from 1,000 square feet (93 m^{2}) of south-facing glass on its greenhouse through a thermal buffer zone in the winter. A swimming pool in the greenhouse provided thermal mass for winter heat storage. In the summer, air from two 24-inch (610 mm) 100-foot-long (30 m) underground earth tubes is used to cool the thermal buffer zone and exhaust heat through 7200 cfm of outer-envelope roof vents.

===== Oregon =====
- Net Zero Energy Building Certification launched in 2011, with an international following. The first project, Painters Hall, is Pringle Creek's Community Center, café, office, art gallery, and event venue. Originally built in the 1930s, Painters Hall was renovated to LEED Platinum Net Zero energy building standards in 2010, demonstrating the potential of converting existing building stock into high‐performance, sustainable building sites. Painters Hall features simple low-cost solutions for energy reduction, such as natural daylighting and passive cooling lighting, that save money and increase comfort. A district ground-source geothermal loop serves the building's GSHP for highly efficient heating and air conditioning. Excess generation from the 20.2 kW rooftop solar array offsets pumping for the neighborhoods geo loop system. Open to the public, Painters Hall is a hub for gatherings of friends, neighbors, and visitors at the heart of a neighborhood designed around nature and community.

===== Pennsylvania =====
- The Phipps Center for Sustainable Landscapes in Pittsburgh was designed to be one of the greenest buildings in the world. It achieved Net Zero Energy Building Certification from the Living Building Challenge in February 2014 and is pursuing full certification. The Phipps Center uses energy conservation technologies such as solar hot water collectors, carbon dioxide sensors, and daylighting, as well as renewable energy technologies to allow it to achieve Net Zero Energy status.
- The Lombardo Welcome Center at Millersville University became the first building in the state to become zero-energy certified. This was the largest step in Millersville University's goal to be carbon neutral by 2040. According to the International Living Future Institute, The Lombardo Welcome Center is one of the highest-performing buildings throughout the country generating 75% more energy than currently being used.

===== Rhode Island =====
- In Newport, the Paul W. Crowley East Bay MET School is the first Net Zero project to be constructed in Rhode Island. It is a 17,000 sq ft building, housing eight large classrooms, seven bathrooms and a kitchen. It will have PV panels to supply all necessary electricity for the building and a geothermal well which will be the source of heat.

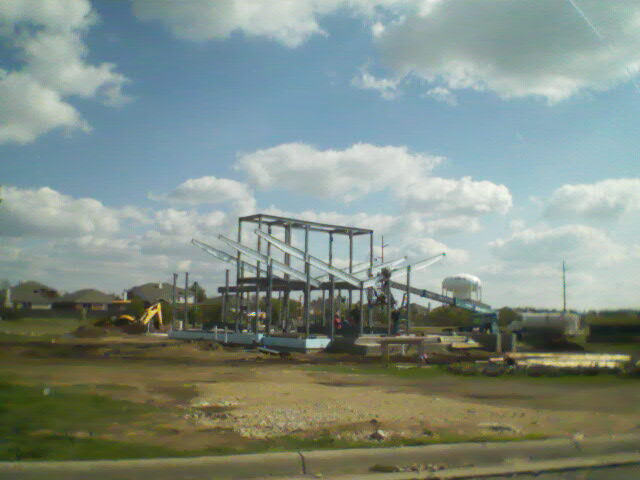
Figure 4: Zero-Energy Lab construction on UNT campus in Denton, Texas

===== Tennessee =====
- civitas, designed by archimania, Memphis, Tennessee. civitas is a case study home on the banks of the Mississippi River, currently under construction. It aims to embrace cultural, climatic, and economic challenges. The home will set a precedent for Southeastern high-performance design.

===== Texas =====
- The University of North Texas (UNT) constructed a Zero Energy Research Laboratory on its 300-acre research campus, Discovery Park, in Denton, Texas. The project was funded at over $1,150,000 and will primarily benefit students in mechanical and energy engineering (UNT became the first university to offer degrees in mechanical and energy engineering in 2006). This 1,200-square-foot structure is now competed and held ribbon-cutting ceremony for the University of North Texas' Zero Energy Laboratory on April 20, 2012.
- The West Irving Library in Irving, Texas, became the first net zero library in Texas in 2011, running entirely off solar energy. Since then it has produced a surplus. It has LEED gold certification.

===== Vermont =====
- The Putney School's net zero Field House was opened on October 10, 2009. In use for over a year, as of December 2010, the Field House used 48,374 kWh and produced a total of 51,371 kWh during the first 12 months of operation, thus performing at slightly better than net-zero. Also in December, the building won an AIA-Vermont Honor Award.
- The Charlotte Vermont House designed by Pill-Maharam Architects is a verified net zero energy house completed in 2007. The project won the Northeast Sustainable Energy Association's Net Zero Energy award in 2009.

== See also ==
- Building-integrated photovoltaics
- Category:Low-energy building
- Deep energy retrofit
- Earthship
- Ecocities
- Energy Neutral Design
- Environmental design
- Environmental economics
- Green building
- Home energy monitor
- Indoor Air Quality, Ventilation and Energy Conservation in Buildings
- Life cycle analysis
- List of low-energy building techniques
- Low-energy house
- Natural building
- Passive house (Passivhaus standard)
- Peak oil
- Sustainable design
- Zero-carbon architecture
- Zero-Net-Energy USA Federal Buildings
- Zero-carbon city
