= IAQVEC =

Indoor Air Quality, Ventilation and Energy Conservation in Buildings Association

- Indoor Air Quality, Ventilation and Energy Conservation in Buildings
- IAQVEC Logo
- Formation: 1992; 34 years ago
- Founded at: Montreal, Canada
- Type: Scientific society, Nonprofit
- Legal status: Not-for-profit organization
- Region served: Worldwide
- Methods: Conferences, Publications
- President: Ooka Ryozo Japan
- Website: www.iaqvec.org

The IAQVEC (Indoor Air Quality, Ventilation and Energy Conservation in Buildings) is an international scientific organisation whose mission is to provide technical support, guidance and technical publications to industry and research organizations for the optimization of indoor air quality, ventilation technology and energy conservation through annual conferences and workshops. The conferences cover a wide range of key research areas with the goal of simultaneously improving indoor environmental quality (IEQ) and energy efficiency enhancing wellbeing and sustainability. The association was established in 1992.

== History ==
Indoor Air Quality, Ventilation and Energy Conservation in Buildings (IAQVEC) was founded by Fariborz Haghighat and Francis Allard in 1992. The first IAQVEC conference was held October 7–9, 1992 at the 5th International Jacques Cartier Conference in Montreal, and an annual meeting has been held since 1992.

Past and future IAQVEC conferences include:

Year	Location	Conference Chairperson (s)
2026	Los Angeles, United States	Prof. Joon-Ho Choi
2023	Tokyo, Japan	Prof. Ryozo Ooka
2019	Bari, Italy	Prof. Umberto Berardi
2016	Seoul, South Korea	Prof. Kwang Woo Kim
2013	Prague, Czech Republic	Prof. Karel Kabele
2010	Syracuse, New York, United States	Prof. Jianshun Zhang
2007	Sendai, Japan	Prof. Hiroshi Yoshino
2004	Toronto, Canada	Prof. Sherif Barackat
2001	Hunan, China	Prof. G. Zhang and Prof. Chow
1998	Lyon, France	Prof. Gerard Guarracino
1995	Montreal, Canada	Prof. Fariborz Haghighat
1992	Montreal, Canada	Prof. Fariborz Haghighat and Prof. Francis Allard

== Objectives ==
The objectives of the association are:

1. To promote scientific, technological and technical advances related to IAQVEC fields at the international level
2. To develop and disseminate knowledge and information related to IAQVEC
3. To promote and organize IAQVEC conferences every three years.

== See also ==
- Air infiltration and Ventilation Centre (AIVC)
- American Society of Heating, Refirigeration, Air-conditioning Engineers (ASHRAE)
- International Building Performance Simulation Association (IBPSA)
- International Society of Indoor Air Quality and Climate (ISIAQ)
