= Fariborz Haghighat =

Iranian-born Canadian academic and engineer

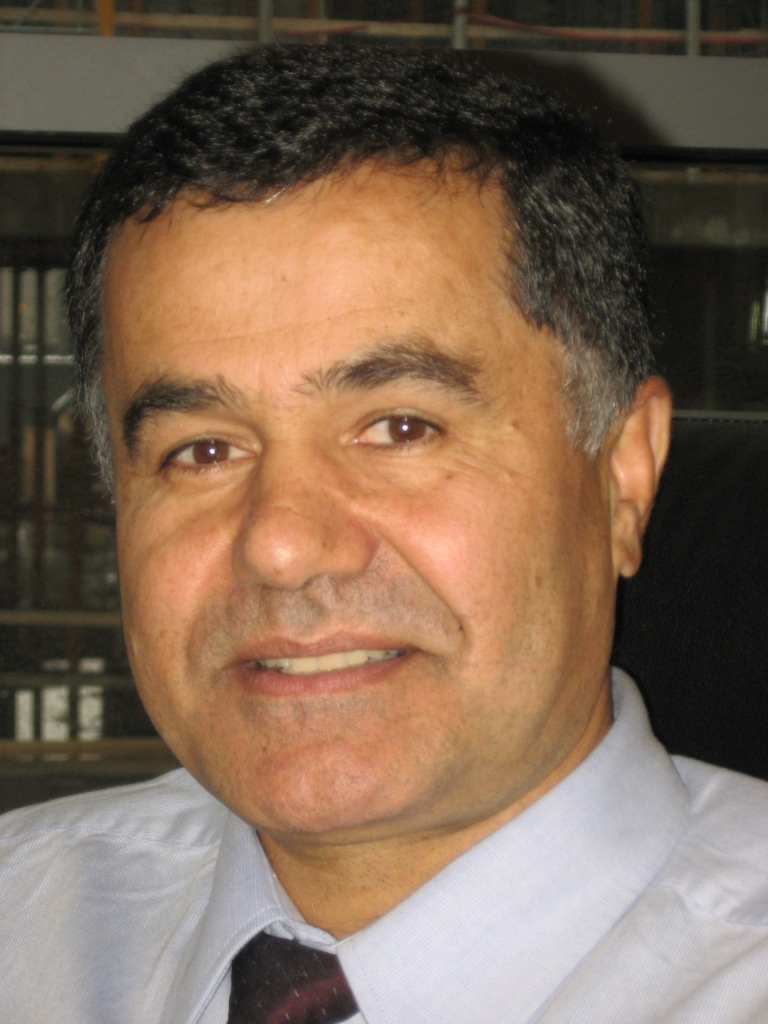
- Fariborz Haghighat
- Education: Arya-Mehr (B.Sc., 1975); University of Arizona (M.Sc., 1978); University of Waterloo (Ph.D., 1985)
- Awards: Fellow ISIAQ (2002); Fellow ASHRAE (2007); Thomas C. Keefer Medal (2015)
- Scientific career
- Fields: Environmental Engineering, Energy, Building Science, Indoor Air Quality, Sustainability, Wastewater Treatment
- Workplaces: Concordia University
- Thesis: Systems - theoretic models for stochastical modelling of physical systems: application to passive solar buildings (1984)

Fariborz Haghighat is an Iranian-Canadian academic, engineer and Distinguished Professor of Building, Civil & Environmental Engineering at Concordia University. Haghighat has a Concordia University Research Chair (Tier I) in Energy and Environment and he was Inducted into the Provost's Circle of Distinction in 2009.

== Early life, education and career ==
He completed his undergraduate degree in chemical engineering at the Aryamehr Technical University of Technology (now called Sharif University of Technology) in 1975. He moved to the United States to continue his M.Sc.Eng. in mechanical engineering at the University of Arizona. In 1983, Haghighat decided to pursue a PhD in Systems Design Engineering at the University of Waterloo. Following his doctoral studies, Haghighat worked as an NSERC Postdoctoral Fellow at the National Research Council.

In 1986, Haghighat started his work as a full-time member of the Centre for Building Studies (CBS) at the Concordia University. He was promoted to associate professor in 1993, and became a Full Professor in 1999. In 2019, he was made a Distinguished University Research Professor in the Department of Building, Civil and Environmental Engineering.

In 1992, Haghighat founded the International Conference on Indoor Air Quality, Ventilation and Energy Conservation in Buildings (IAQVEC).

== Research ==
Haghighat serves as a subject matter expert on various national and international committees, and Editor Board member of several international scientific journals. He has authored over 400 papers in the peer-reviewed scientific journals, conference papers, proceedings, books, contributions to books and technical reports.

Haghighat's many accomplishments throughout his career includes:

- Editor-in-chief, International Journal of Sustainable Cities and Society (SCS)
- Editor-in-chief, International Journal of Energy and Built Environment (EBE)
- Operating Agent, International Energy Agency, ECES Annex 31: "Energy storage with Net Zero Energy Buildings and Districts: Optimisation and Automation"
- Operating Agent, International Energy Agency, ECES Annex 23: "Applying Energy Storage in Buildings of the Future"
- Canadian Representative, International Energy Agency, ECES Annex 53: "Total energy use in buildings: Analysis and evaluation methods"
- Member, Editorial Board of the International Journal of Ventilation
- Member, Editorial Board of the International Journal of Building Simulation
- International Editorial Board, Editorial Board of the International Journal of High-Rise Buildings

== Honours ==
Haghighat is a member of the Professional Engineers of Ontario since 1998.

Since 2002 he has been a member of ISIAQ Academy of Fellows – International Society of Indoor Air Quality and Climate (previously known as IAIAS, the International Academy of Indoor Air Sciences).

He is an Honorary Theme Editor (HTE) for the Theme 1.32 – Technology, Information, and Systems Management to develop the UNESCO's Encyclopedia of Life Support Systems (ELOSS).

He was awarded Fellow, American Society of Heating, Refrigeration and Air-Conditioning Engineers (ASHRAE) in 2007.

Haghighat received the Thomas C. Keefer Medal (2015) for his paper entitled "Efficient non-hydrostatic modelling of flow and bed shear stress in a pier scour hole", Canadian Journal of Civil Engineering, 2014, 41(5): 450–460.

In 2008, Haghighat and his wife Roya Haghighat established the "Fariborz and Roya Haghighat Entrance Scholarship in Engineering". This entrance scholarship is intended to promote and recognize academic excellence among newly admitted undergraduate students in the Gina Cody School of Engineering and Computer Science.

== See also ==
- List of University of Waterloo people
