= Matthew Grocoff =

Matt Grocoff
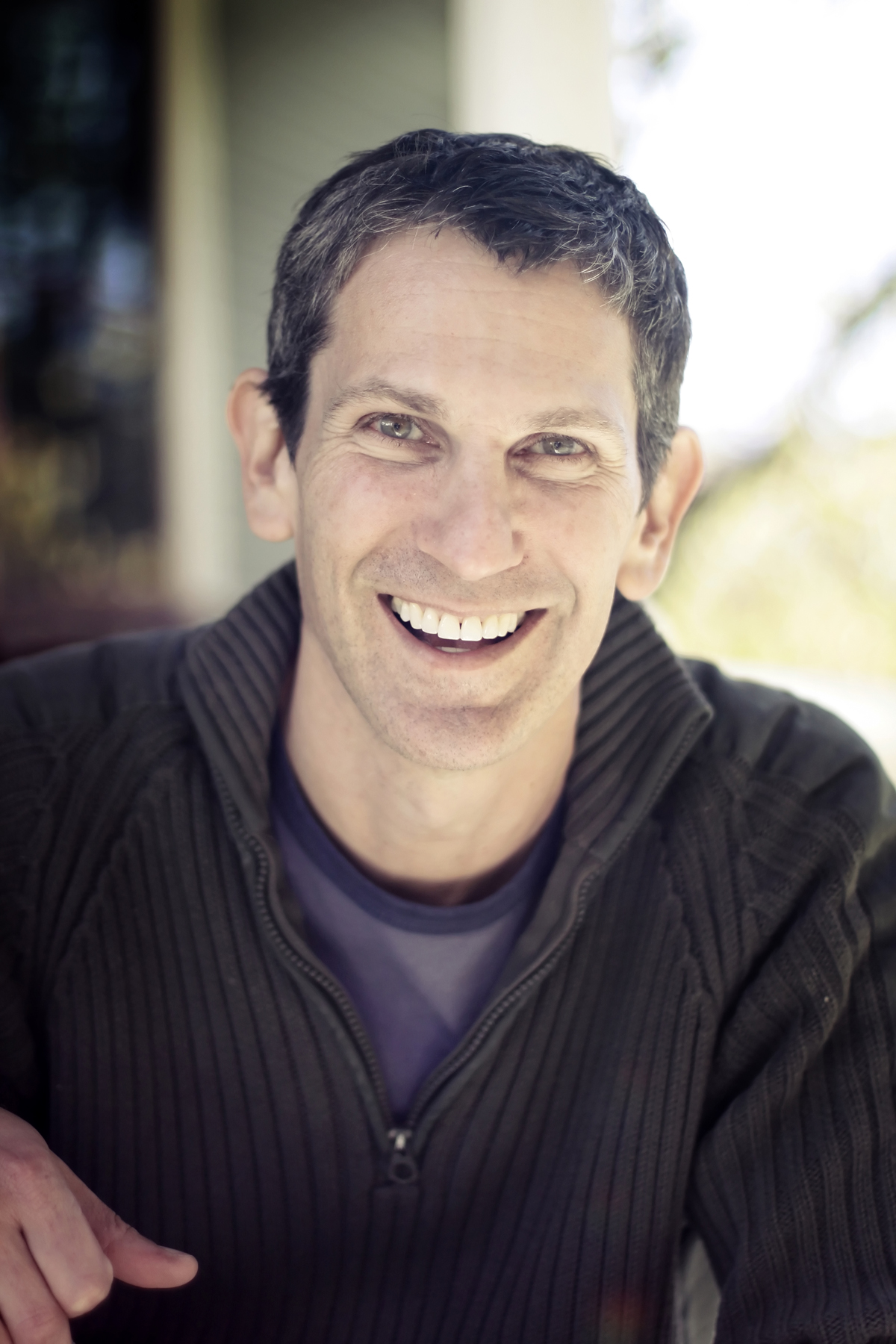
- Born: Matthew Grocoff
- Citizenship: United States
- Education: University of Georgia School of Law
- Occupations: Real Estate Developer, Writer, Speaker, Sustainability Advocate
- Employer: THRIVE Collaborative
- Known for: Net Zero Energy Buildings, Modernized Water Infrastructure, and Living Buildings
- Awards: USA Today Best Green Homes of 2010 Michigan Green Leader

Matthew "Matt" Grocoff is an American environmentalist, sustainability advocate, sustainable real estate developer, writer, speaker and founder of the THRIVE Collaborative. He is known for his work on net zero energy and net zero water buildings and for the rehabilitation of the oldest home in North America to achieve net zero energy. Grocoff is a contributor to the radio show The Environment Report produced by Michigan Radio (part of the NPR network), FOX News Energy Team, and was host of GreenovationTV. He advocates for modernized distributed renewable energy networks and distributed water and wastewater systems that work with natural systems.

== Living Community Challenge and Veridian at County Farm ==
Grocoff is developing one of the world's first projects to register for the Living Community Challenge. The Living Community Challenge is a certification of the International Living Future Institute intended to bring the Living Building Challenge to the community scale. The development is targeted to be a mixed-income net zero energy community: 100% all-electric, powered by solar, with resilient energy storage and no gas lines or combustion appliances. Grocoff's project, Veridian at County Farm, is repurposing the site of a former youth prison adjacent to the 130 acre County Farm Park in Ann Arbor, Michigan. Veridian at County Farm was among 100 projects worldwide highlighted in the Local Projects Challenge at the 2020 World Urban Forum 10 in Abu Dhabi as part of the United Nations program for Accelerating the UN Sustainable Development Goals.

== Mission Zero House ==
Grocoff first gained national attention for the rehabilitation of his Victorian-era Mission Zero house in Ann Arbor, Michigan. Built in 1901, the home is considered the oldest home in America to achieve net zero energy. The Atlantic Magazine called the work "sustainable perfection". The home is featured on the cover of the book, No Regrets Remodeling: How to Create a Comfortable, Healthy Home That Saves Energy. In 2013, Grocoff and his company THRIVE partnered with BLUElab from the University of Michigan College of Engineering and offered his home as community testbed for net zero water and restoration of ecological water flow to pre-development conditions. The project is the first Cold Climate home certified as a Net Zero Energy Building under the Living Building Challenge, which is based on actual rather than anticipated performance. Grocoff calls the home "Mission Zero House" in honor of Ray Anderson, founder and chairman of Interface, Inc., who, in 1994, pledged that his multi-national carpet company would meet a "Mission Zero" goal to eliminate any negative impact it may have on the environment by the year 2020.

== Recognition ==
In 2012, Grocoff was awarded Michigan Green Leader by the Detroit Free Press. USA Today honored him with a Best Green Home of 2010. MyFORD Magazine selected Grocoff as the #1 Electric Innovator. Grocoff received the first Net Zero Hero Award from the Green Home Institute.
