= The Environment Report =

Radio program

- Genre: Daily Show
- Running time: 4 min
- Country of origin: United States
- Language: English
- Home station: Michigan Radio
- Syndicates: National Public Radio
- Hosted by: Lester Graham, Mark Brush, and Rebecca Williams
- Produced by: Mark Brush
- Recording studio: Ann Arbor, MI
- Original release: 1993 – 2009
- Audio format: Stereophonic
- Website: environmentreport.org

The Environment Report was a show produced and syndicated by Michigan Radio (WUOM) in Ann Arbor, Michigan.

== Show ==
=== Mission ===
The Environment Report's (TER) mission was to be a news service committed to revealing the relationship between the natural world and the everyday lives of people.

== History ==
=== 1993-2006: Great Lakes Radio Consortium ===
The Environment Report was established to increase environmental coverage by public radio stations. In 1993, a group of public radio outlets began planning a regional environmental news service that would redefine environmental reporting in the Upper Midwest. National Public Radio's Living on Earth, Michigan Public Radio, and the Superior Radio Network partnered together to develop the structure for a weekly news service. The goal was to establish a news feed of high-quality environmental features that could be inserted into the local news programming of public radio stations.

In September 1995, The Environment Report's predecessor, the Great Lakes Radio Consortium (GLRC), produced its first environmental news feed for public radio stations. At that time the news service was based at the studios of Michigan Public Radio in East Lansing, MI and was carried by 23 stations.

In April, 1996, the news service moved to the studios of Michigan Radio in Ann Arbor. By the end of 1996, 50 stations were carrying the service.

Beginning in 1996, The Environment Report's producers also provided training to more than 100 mid-career public radio producers. This training was led by Canadian Broadcasting Corporation veteran David Candow.

In 1997, the GLRC won eight national awards. These awards led to greater station carriage as well as more participation from station-based producers.

=== 2006-2016: The Environment Report ===
In the summer of 2006, the GLRC became known as The Environment Report. The name change reflected the organization's expanding list of participating stations as well as its expanded coverage of environmental issues.

Two years later, The Environment Report's producers embarked on a new effort - transitioning the weekly news service into a daily news service. As part of that effort, a daily four-minute show was developed with assistance from Jim Russell (creator of Marketplace) and public radio program directors and news directors around the country.

== Structure ==
The Environment Report was a syndicated public radio show hosted by Lester Graham. In addition to the daily show, The Environment Report produced a stand-alone feature and spot news reports every weekday. The service was carried by public stations across the country.

== Staff ==
=== Lester Graham ===
Lester Graham was Host and Senior Editor of The Environment Report. He has been a board member of the Public Radio News Directors Incorporated, a member of the Radio-Television News Directors, President of the Illinois News Broadcasters Association and Vice-President of the Saint Louis Chapter of the Society of Professional Journalists. He is also a member of the Society of Environmental Journalists.

=== Mark Brush ===
Mark Brush was The Environment Report's Senior Producer. He oversaw the overall editorial direction and day-to-day operations of the daily environmental news service. He's won several national awards for his environmental reporting and editing. Brush is a graduate of the University of Michigan ('00 MS in Environmental Policy and Planning & '91 BA in Political Science). He has worked in public radio since 1998.

=== Rebecca Williams ===
Rebecca Williams was a reporter and producer for The Environment Report. She also filled in as host. Rebecca has a natural science degree from the University of Michigan's School of Natural Resources & Environment. She has won several national awards for her work including a first place National Headliner Award at the network level for her stories on the emerald ash borer.

== Contributors ==
=== Matthew Grocoff ===
Graham worked with Greenovation.TV host Matt Grocoff on a series as Matt worked to make his own home the oldest net zero energy home in America and Michigan's first net-zero house.

== Stations That Played The Environment Report ==
At its peak, The Environment Report was played on over 100 stations nationwide.

== Awards ==
=== 1996 ===
Northwest Broadcast News Association, University of Minnesota, Minneapolis, MN, Best Series:

International Joint Commission Biennial Meeting

Michigan Associated Press, Best Investigative News Story:

Incinerator Sited in Minority Neighborhood

Sierra Club Environmental Journalism Awards:

Producer: Joan Silvi Michigan Public Radio - East Lansing, MI
Producer: Craig Fahle Michigan Public Radio - East Lansing, MI
Producer: Gretchen Millich WKAR - East Lansing, MI

=== 1997 ===
Gabriel Awards, UNDA-USA:

Girl’s Garden
Hunters Against Hunger

Heart of America Award, American Legion Auxiliary, Honorable Mention:

Girl’s Garden

Prindi Awards (Public Radio News Directors, Inc.), Best Commentary – Editorial:

Paving over Nature

National Headliner Awards, Press Club of Atlantic City, Best Feature or Human Interest Story – Second Place:

Club Prophylactive

Unity Awards in Media, Lincoln University of Missouri, Best Reporting of Economics:

Heartside Development

Unity Awards in Media, Lincoln University of Missouri, Best Reporting of Politics:

Operation Silver Shovel

American Women in Radio and Television, Gracie Allen Awards, Best News Feature:

Girl’s Garden

American Women in Radio and Television, Gracie Allen Awards, Best Work Produced by Women:

Infant Massage

American Women in Radio and Television, Gracie Allen Awards, Best Editorial:

Paving Over Nature

Northwest Broadcast News Association Awards, First Place, Best Audio, All Markets:

Return of the Trumpeter Swan

Northwest Broadcast News Association Awards, First Place, General Reporting, Large Market:

Toxic Train Blockage

Northwest Broadcast News Association Awards, Merit Award, Spot News, Large Market:

Civil Disobedience at Project Elf

Wisconsin Associated Press, First Place, best Audio, Large Market:

Return of the Trumpeter Swan

Wisconsin Associated Press, First Place, General Reporting, Large Market:

Toxic Train Blockage

Wisconsin Associated Press, First Place, Spot News, Large Market:

Civil Disobedience at Project Elf

Wisconsin Broadcasters Association, First Place, Best Audio, Large Market:

Return of the Trumpeter Swan

Michigan Association of Broadcasters, Broadcasting Excellence Awards, Best Use of Medium:

Girl’s Garden

Michigan Association of Broadcasters, Broadcasting Excellence Awards, Best Public Affairs Programming:

Great Lakes Radio Consortium

Michigan Association of Broadcasters, Broadcasting Excellence Awards, Merit Award for Feature:

Heartside Development

Michigan Associated Press, Best Individual Reporting:

Wendy Nelson

Michigan Associated Press, Best Natural Sound:

Three Brothers Shipwreck

Michigan Associated Press, Honorable Mention:

Snail Man

Illinois Associated Press Broadcaster's Association Journalistic Excellence, Best Reporter:

Rob Schober

Michigan Sportsmen Association, Environmental Journalism Award:

Hunter’s Against Hunger

=== 1998 ===
New York Festivals, Radio Production Awards, Finalist – Business/Consumer Issues:

Synthetic Wine Corks Popping Up All Over

Michigan Association of Broadcasters, Broadcast Excellence Awards, Merit Award for Environmental Reporting:

There Could Be an Oil Tank Buried in Your Yard
Fertility Drugs and Population Control
Synthetic Wine Corks Popping Up All Over
Football Trash Talking

Michigan Education Association, School Bell Awards, Best Radio Feature:

Digging Up the Region's Past

Michigan Associated Press Awards, Best use of Natural Sound:

Compost Man
Endangered Foghorns

Michigan Associated Press Awards, Best Individual Reporting:

Synthetic Wine Corks Popping Up All Over
Inland Shrimp Farmer Grows Up

Minnesota Chapter of the Society of Professional Journalists, Page One Awards, First Place, Feature Category:

Rare Plant Finder

Minnesota Chapter of the Society of Professional Journalists, Page One Awards, Third Place, In-Depth Reporting:

Reducing Mercury in Wastewater

=== 1999 ===
The New York Festivals, Radio Production Awards, Silver Medalist – Environmental Program:

Light Pollution – A “Glowing” Problem

Michigan Associated Press Awards, Best News Documentary:

A Mother’s Crusade
Federal Policy Spurs Clean-Up
Getting the Lead Out of Home Renovations
Unique Treatment Program Makes Progress

Michigan Associated Press Awards, Excellence in Individual Reporting:

Great Lakes CD-ROM
Global Worming

Michigan Associated Press Awards, best Sports Feature:

The Dare-Devil Sport of Luge

Michigan Associated Press Awards, Best Feature Story, Honorable Mention:

Light Pollution – A “Glowing” Problem

Michigan Education Association, School Bell Awards, Best Radio Feature:

Great Lakes CD-ROM
Floating Classroom Promotes Science

Michigan Association of Broadcasters, Broadcast Excellence Awards, Merit Award for Environmental Reporting:

Jet-Ski Controversy
Julia of the Jungle
A Mother’s Crusade
Federal Policy Spurs Clean-Up
The Horse Whisperer

=== 2000 ===
The Clarion Awards, Best Radio Feature Story – Public Radio:

Legacy Left by Cormorant Slaughter (Part 2)

The New York Festivals, Radio Production, Silver Medalist – Environmental Issues:

Legacy Left by Cormorant Slaughter (Part 2)

Association for Women Journalists, Finalist:

Polio Vaccine Under Fire

The New York Festivals, Radio Production Awards, Finalist – Education Issues:

The Road-Kill Lesson Plan

American Legion Auxiliary “Heart of America” Awards, Finalist:

Polio Vaccine Under Fire

National Headliner Award, First Place, Investigative Reporting:

Potato Farms Create ‘Super-Sized’ Problem (Part 1)
Potato Farms Create ‘Super-Sized’ Problem (Part 2)

Michigan Associated Press Awards, Best Feature Story:

The Road-Kill Lesson Plan

Michigan Associated Press Awards, Best Enterprise/Investigative Reporting:

Golf Course Erodes Support (Part 1)
Golf Course Drives Legislation (Part 2)

Michigan Associated Press Awards, Best Sports Feature Story:

The Tradition of Sturgeon Spearing

Minnesota Chapter of the Society of Journalists, Page One Awards, First Place, Investigative Reporting:

Potato Farms Create ‘Super-Sized’ Problem (Part 1)
Potato Farms Create ‘Super-Sized’ Problem (Part 2)

Minnesota Associated Press Broadcaster's Achievement Awards, Best Feature – Honorable Mention:

City Ignites Green Space

Ottawa County Farm Bureau, Ag Communicatory of the Year Award:

Wendy Nelson

=== 2001 ===
American Legion Auxiliary's Heart of American Awards, First Place:

Drug Courts Try to End Cycle of Abuse (Part 1)
Are Drug Courts the Best Approach? (Part 2)

American Legion Auxiliary's Heart of America Awards, Finalist:

Race Day for Women’s War Canoe
Combating Asthma with Education (Part 1)
Tracking Asthma in Urban Children (Part 2)
Activities May Ease Alzheimer’s Disease (Part 1)
Alzheimer’s Patients Take Up Gardening (Part 2)

Michigan Association of Broadcasters, Best Mini-Documentary/Series:

Drug Courts Try to End Cycle of Abuse (Part 1)
Are Drug Courts the Best Approach? (Part 2)

Michigan Association of Broadcasters, Best Special Interest Programming:

Trumpeter Swans on the Rebound
Treasure in Toronto Trash?
Meth Labs Put Environment At Risk (Part 2)

Michigan Associated Press, Best Feature Story:

Drug Courts Try to End Cycle of Abuse (Part 1)

Michigan Associated Press, Best Sports Feature Story:

Youth Rodeo on the Rise

Michigan Associated Press, Best Enterprise/Investigative Reporting:

Plutonium Shipment Outrages Activists

Michigan Education Association, School Bell Awards, Best Radio Features:

Helping Teens Kick the Habit
Operation Lice Be Gone
Kids Pluck Lessons from Business

=== 2002 ===
RTNDA Edward R. Murrow Award, Best Use of Sound:

Mallard Ducks on the Decline

New York Festivals, Finalist: Best New Analysis or Commentary:

No Such Thing as a just War

New York Festivals, Bronze Medalist: Best Sound:

Mallard Ducks on the Decline

Public Radio News Directors, Inc (PRNDI), First Place, Commentary:

Commentary – The Naked Truth

Public Radio News Directors, Inc (PRNDI), Second Place, Hard Feature:

Mallard Ducks on the Decline

Michigan Associated Press, Best Enterprise/Investigative Story:

Keeping Resources Safe from Terrorism

Michigan Associated Press:

Huck Finn Rides Again
Mallard Ducks on the Decline
Increasing Water Supply Safety

=== 2003 ===
American Institute of biological Sciences, Honorable Mention:

Unraveling Mystery of Birds’ Night Calls

Wisconsin Broadcasters Association, best Use of Audio:

Fishing Relics Fading Away

Society of Environmental Journalists, Third Place, Outstanding Beat Reporting – Radio:

Raging Grannies Take to the Streets
Environmental Cloak and Dagger
Bike Commuters Coast Through Winter Weather

=== 2004 ===
Michigan Association of Broadcaster Broadcast Excellence Awards Merit Award Feature/Use of Sound:

Apples Alone Not Enough for Many Orchard Owners

=== 2005 ===
National Headliner Awards:

Midwest Fertilizer use Causing Gulf Dead Zone?
Government Aims to remedy Gulf “Dead Zone”
Action Plan Not Enough to Shrink Gulf “Dead Zone”

Society of Environmental Journalists, Second Place – Outstanding Radio Reporting, Large Market:

How Long Do You Keep a Polluting Heap?
Containing Chronic Wasting Disease
Packrats Hooked on Freecycling

=== 2006 ===
National Headliner Awards, Breaking News or Continuing Coverage of a Single News Event:

Ten Threats; Hidden Costs of Invasives

National Headliner Awards, Feature, Human Interest Story or News Service:

Up Close and Personal with a Prairie Fire

PRNDI (Public Radio News Directors Inc) Division A:

How Long Do You Keep a Polluting Heap?

=== 2007 ===
National Headliner Award, First Place, Continuing Coverage:

States Struggle to Control Ash Borer
Ash Borer Devastates Nursery Industry
Easing the Ash Borer’s Financial Bite
Firewood Fuels Ash Borer Problem

Michigan Association of Broadcasters, Feature/Use of Medium:

Roots of the Great Lakes Fishery

=== 2008 ===
Society of Environmental Journalists, Outstanding Story, Radio – Third Place:

Frogs: A Love Story

Public Radio News Directors, Enterprise/Investigative – First Place:

Sex Toy Safety

=== 2009 ===
National Headliner Awards, News Series – Third Place:

Big Nuke Company Seeks CO_{2} Cuts
Part 1: Stuck with Old Nuke Plants
Part II: Stuck with Old Nuke Plants

Society of Environmental Journalists Awards, Outstanding Beat, In-Depth Radio – Third Place:

Big Nuke Company Seeks CO_{2} Cuts
Part 1: Stuck with Old Nuke Plants
Part II: Stuck with Old Nuke Plants
