= Energy neutral design =

Design philosophy

An Energy Neutral Design is a design of any type (Website, Multi-media, Architecture, Art, Music, Entertainment, etc.) that has the environment and low energy consumption practices in mind during all stages of planning and production.

Energy neutral design can also refer to environmentally powered electronics, where devices absorb or harvest energy from their immediate surroundings (ex. light, heat, radio waves, motion) and transform it to the electricity they require for their operation. One example of this is the batteryless radio. Research specifically in Wireless Sensor Networks (WSNs) and Internet of Things (IoT) devices targets energy neutral design by taking miniature technologies and using ideas like data compression and non-continuous data transmission to reduce energy consumption.

== Examples ==
- Zero-energy building
- Energy efficiency in British housing
- Carbon footprint
- Low-carbon economy
- Live Earth
- Reverb

== See also ==
- Energy Portal
