= Indira Paryavaran Bhawan =

Coordinates: 28.585°N 77.218°E

- Interactive map of the Indira Paryavaran Bhawan area

General information
- Type: Office
- Location: 166, Jor Bagh Road, Block 17, Lodhi Colony; New Delhi, Delhi 110003, India
- Construction started: January 25, 2011; 15 years ago
- Completed: October 31, 2013; 12 years ago
- Inaugurated: February 28, 2014; 12 years ago
- Cost: INR209 Cr
- Owner: Ministry of Environment, Forest and Climate Change

Technical details
- Floor count: G+7 (+3 basements floors)
- Floor area: 32,000 sq.m
- Lifts/elevators: 7

Design and construction
- Architecture firm: Central Public Works Department
- Awards: LEED India Platinum, GRIHA 5 Star

Other information
- Parking: 330 Cars

Indira Paryavaran Bhawan is India's first on-site net-zero building located in New Delhi, India. The building houses the Ministry of Environment, Forest and Climate Change (MoEFCC) accommodating three ministers and their offices along with about 600 officials. The building, designed and constructed by the Central Public Works Department (CPWD), was completed in 2013 at a cost of INR 209 Crore.

The inauguration of the building, 28 February 2014, was conducted by the then prime minister Dr. Manmohan Singh. The building is rated as a five-star GRIHA (Green Rating for Integrated Habitat Assessment) by MNRE and LEED India Platinum by Indian Green Building Council (IGBC) rating. The building has its own solar power plant, sewage treatment facility, fully automatic robotic multi-level car parking system facility & puzzle parking facility, and geothermal heat exchange system.

== Details ==
Indira Paryavaran Bhawan consists of two blocks within the premises connected through a corridor. Each block is a G+7 storey structure with 3 basements. The total floor area of the campus is 32,000 sq.metre. Each floor consists of office spaces, meeting rooms, conference rooms etc. The building consists of 7 elevators and a central atrium located in between the two blocks.

Indira Paryavaran Bhawan is located in a composite climate zone, a mix of hot, dry, humid, and cold climatic conditions, and the design involves multiple active, passive, and renewable strategies to achieve net zero goal. The building is divided into 5 sections: Vayu (Wind), Agni (Fire), Jal (Water), Prithvi (Earth), and Aakash (Space) depicting the 5 elements that all matters are composed of, as per Hinduism. Indira Paryavaran Bhawan is a set example that impinges on society's consciousness towards environmental awareness for adopting green building concepts in India.

The Union environment ministry is facing a challenge of a garden variety - bird droppings, soiling the courtyard of Indira Paryavaran Bhawan, which houses it, and is amongst the India's highest green-rated buildings. Individuals or organizations which will offer the best solution will be awarded an amount of ₹1 lakh.

== Design ==
=== Passive Design Strategies ===
==== Orientation ====
The orientation of the building is set towards north south direction, to accommodate natural daylight and air movement in the building, a central atrium and corridor provide cross ventilation within the building.

==== Landscaping and Horticulture ====
More than 50% of the area outside the building is covered with plantations, to conserve as many existing trees as possible, out of a total of 79 trees, only 19 trees are cut and 11 trees are transplanted. The pathways and circulation roads in the building are made with grass paver blocks for ground water percolation and ground water recharge. The 7th floor of building also consists of a terrace garden.

==== Daylighting and Ventilation ====
The building is designed to ensure daylight in more than 75% of the floor space and to reduce dependency on active lighting devices. The central atrium located between the two blocks allows natural movement of air due to stack effect. The provision of windows further enhances the process of cross ventilation.

==== Building Envelope and Fenestration ====
The building envelope construction comprises heavy weight construction. The external wall consists of 30 cm thick Autoclave Aerated Concrete (AAC) block, 7 cm thick mineral wool insulation, 12 cm thick air gap and 12 cm thick 'Fal-G' [proprietary blend of fly ash (Fa), lime (L) and gypsum (G)] block brick, and has a U-value of .221 W/m^{2}K. The external roof of the building consists of 2 cm thick clay tile, 6 cm thick cement mortar, 4 cm thick PUF insulation, 6 cm thick brick bat coba, 6 cm thick cement mortar,10 cm thick concrete. High reflectance terrace tiles are installed on the building roof for roof cool treatment - low heat ingress, high strength and hard wearing. Windows installed in the building with uPVC (Unplasticized Polyvinyl Chloride) frame are hermetically sealed double glazed with gas filling with a U-Value of 0.26 W/m^{2}K and SHGC of 0.32 and aluminium frame.

==== Material and Construction technique ====
Fly ash bricks and heat-insulating Autoclave Aerated Concrete blocks along with fly ash-based mortar and plaster are used for walls. Low energy materials and locally available stones are utilized for flooring. Bamboo jute composite that is rapidly renewable is used for door frames and shutters. Low VOC paints are used to improvise indoor air quality.

=== Active Design Strategies ===
==== Lighting Design ====
Energy efficient lights are provided in the interior and exterior lighting system of the building. To maximize energy efficiency in lighting, the artificial lighting in the building is regulated using a lux-level sensor. The lighting power density is kept close to 5 W/m^{2} which is 50% more efficient than the Energy Conservation Building Code 2007 requirement (Lighting Power Density = 11 W/m^{2}). The lighting load is supplied by the building integrated photovoltaic (BIPV) power plant.

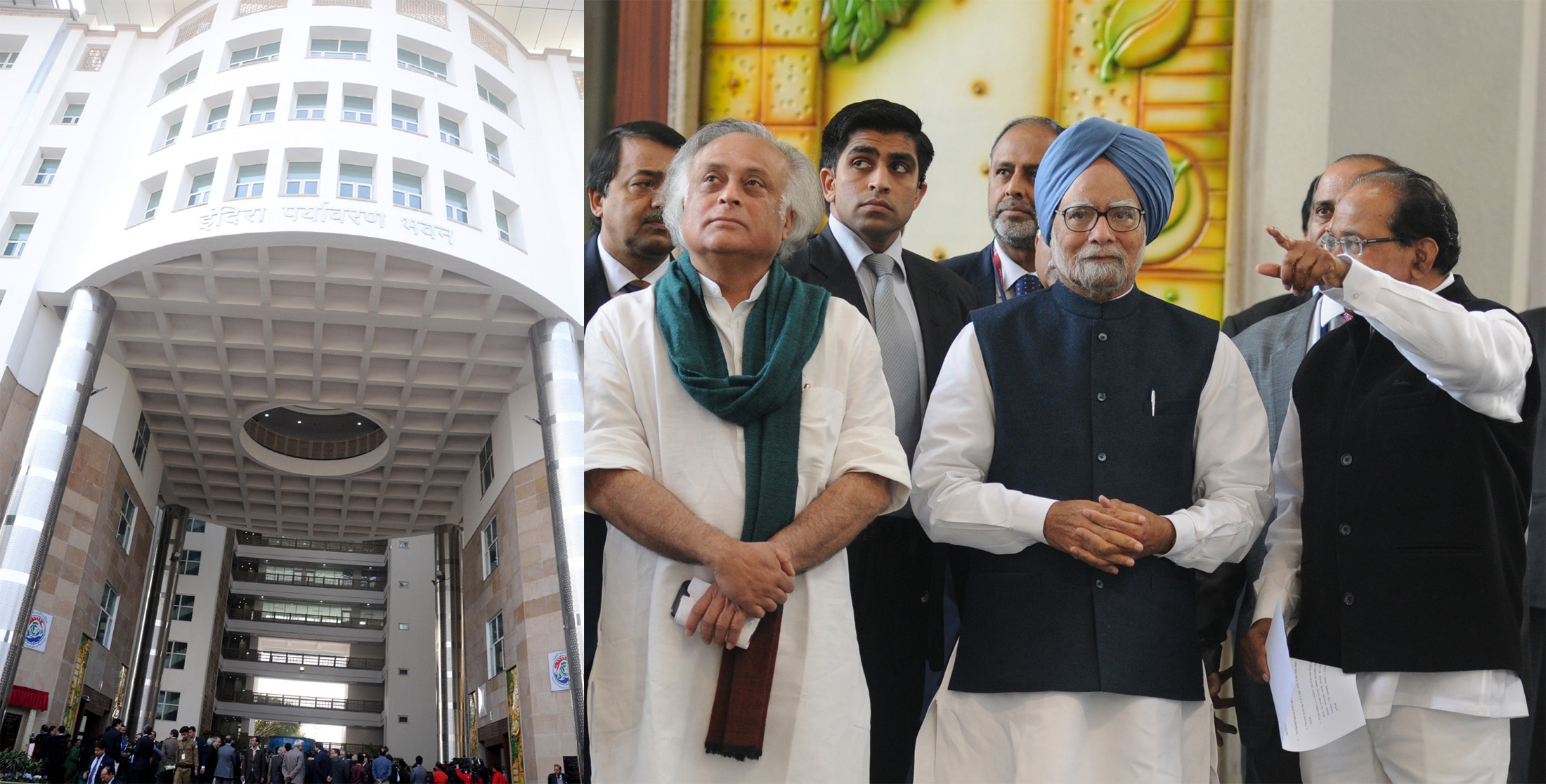
Manmohan Singh at the inauguration ceremony of Indira Paryavaran Bhawan in New Delhi.

==== Optimized HVAC System ====
The building is centrally air conditioned. Chilled beam system technology is used to meet 160 TR air conditioning load of the building. The process of air conditioning happens by convection currents rather than air supply by ducts. The chilled beams are used from second to sixth floor and this system has reduced energy utilization by up to 50% as compared to the conventional system. Integrated building management is utilized to control HVAC equipment and to monitor related systems. For energy efficiency, the room temperature is maintained at 26 ±1 °C.

=== Geothermal Heat Exchange System ===
To minimize the load on the HVAC system, a vertical closed loop system of geothermal heat exchange system is implemented. This is the first time it has been adopted on a large scale in a government building in India. The system takes advantage of the difference between the ambient temperature and the temperature below the ground level.

The vertical closed loop system consists of 180 vertical bores all over the premises to a depth of 80 meters. A minimum distance of 3 meters between any two bores is retained. Every bore has a 32mm outer diameter HDPE pipe U-loop and is connected in the central air conditioning plant room to the condenser water pipe system. A single U-Loop with a heat rejection capacity of 0.9TR results in a heat rejection capacity of 160TR from 180 vertical bores, resulting in reduction of cooling tower load and subsequent reduction in water consumption.

=== Renewable Energy Systems ===
A building integrated photovoltaic (BIPV) Power Plant has been installed on the entire roof surface of the building and court area. This clean and green renewable energy system has helped in meeting the energy demand of the building to achieve the target of net-zero energy.

Indira Paryavaran Bhawan Solar Photovoltaic Power Plant Specifications
Parameter	Quantity
Capacity of Power Generation	930 kW Peak
Annual Energy Requirement	14,00,000 Unit (kWh)
Annual Energy Generation	14,00,000 Unit (kWh)
Net Energy Consumption	ZERO
Total area	6000 m^{2}
Total area of Solar panels	4600 m^{2}
Type of Photovoltaic panel	Mono Crystalline 20% efficiency
Number of panels	2844
Nature of Power Generation	Grid Interactive

=== Robotic Car Parking ===
Automated parking system is used on all 3 levels of the basement. The first basement is designed for the lobby and puzzle parking system for car entry and exit. The second and third basement floors use robotic dolly parking systems. The capacity for the first basement is 49, the second basement is 126, and the third basement is 170.

=== Water Management ===
The landscape and horticulture design of planting native species along with efficient irrigation systems are utilized leading up to 50% reduction in water requirement. The remaining water demand is met by recycling and reusing wastewater, and by implementation of rainwater harvesting systems. Additionally, low discharge and efficient water fixtures are installed including sensor urinals and dual flow cisterns.

== Savings ==
Conservation Scenario of Conventional Design vs Indira Paryavaran Bhawan
Annual Consumption	Conventional Design	Indira Paryavaran Bhawan	Saving
Electricity	22,00,000 kWh	14,00,000 kWh	40%
Water	20,000 kL	9,000 kL	55%

== Awards ==
The building has received the following awards.

Month, Year	Award
February 2013	The Project received an award from Adarsh/GRIHA of MNRE for exemplary demonstration of Integration of Renewable Energy Technologies
January 2014	The Project was accorded 5-Star Green Building Certification by GRIHA under MNRE
