= Carbon profiling =

Calculation of annual carbon dioxide emissions from building space

Carbon profiling is a mathematical process that calculates how much carbon dioxide is put into the atmosphere per m^{2} of space in a building over one year. The analysis has two parts that are added together to produce an overall figure that is termed the 'carbon profile':

- Operational carbon emissions
- Embodied carbon emissions

== Embodied carbon emissions ==
Embodied carbon emissions relate to the amount of carbon dioxide emitted into the atmosphere from creating and maintaining the materials that form a building, e.g. the carbon dioxide released from the baking of bricks or smelting of iron. These emissions can also be considered to be Upfront Carbon Emissions, or UCE. “Embodied carbon refers to the carbon footprint associated with building materials, from cradle to grave," and can be quantified as a part of environmental impact using life-cycle assessment (LCA).

In the Carbon Profiling Model these emissions are measured as Embodied Carbon Efficiency (ECE), measured as kg of CO_{2}/m^{2}/year.

As of 2018, "Embodied carbon is responsible 11% of global GHG emissions and 28% of global building sector emissions ... Embodied carbon will be responsible for almost half of total new construction emissions between now and 2050." Zero-carbon architecture (similar to zero-energy building), incorporates design techniques that maximize embodied carbon.

Steve Webb, co-founder of Webb Yates Engineers, says: "We’ve known for a long time that aluminium, steel, concrete and ceramics have very high embodied energy ... High carbon frames should be taxed like cigarettes. There should be a presumption in favour of timber and stone."

== Occupational carbon emissions ==
Occupational carbon emissions relate to the amount of carbon dioxide emitted into the atmosphere from the direct use of energy to run the building e.g. the heating or electricity used by the building over the year. In the Carbon Profiling Model these emissions are measured in BER’s (Building Emission Rate) in kg of CO_{2}/m^{2}/year.

The BER is a United Kingdom government accepted unit of measurement that comes from an approved calculation process called sBEM (Simplified Building Emission Model)

The purpose of Carbon Profiling is to provide a method of analyzing and comparing both operational and embodied carbon emissions at the same time. With this information it is then possible to allocate a project's resources in such a way to minimize the total amount of Carbon Dioxide emitted into the atmosphere through the use of a given piece of space.

A secondary benefit is that having quantified the Carbon Profiling of different buildings it is then possible to make comparisons and rank buildings in term of their performance. This allows investors and occupiers to identify which building are good and bad carbon investments.

Simon Sturgis and Gareth Roberts of Sturgis Associates in the United Kingdom originally developed ‘Carbon Profiling’ in December 2007.
