= Executive Order 13514 =

Executive Order 13514 (or EO 13514) was an Executive Order, entitled Federal Leadership in Environmental, Energy, and Economic Performance, which U.S. President Barack Obama issued on October 5, 2009. EO 13514 was replaced by Executive Order 13693, titled Planning for Federal Sustainability in the Next Decade, issued by Obama on March 19, 2015. The Office of the Federal Environmental Executive, whose name was changed to the Office of Federal Sustainability by Executive Order 13693, is housed at the Council on Environmental Quality within the Executive Office of the President of the United States. Its role is to oversee policy, guidance, and implementation of the sustainability Executive Order.

Executive Order 13514 required the Federal agencies to measure and reduce greenhouse gas emissions resulting from Federal operations, improve energy efficiency, increase use of renewable energy, reduce water consumption, and purchase energy efficient and environmentally preferable goods and materials. The aggregate Federal government greenhouse gas emissions reduction goal resulting from EO 13514 totaled 28% by 2020, corresponding to a projected $8 - $11 billion reduction in the Federal government's energy bill.

The Executive Order also required Federal agencies to publish an annual Strategic Sustainability Plan, and called on the Office of Management and Budget to measure and report on Federal agent progress against goals in annual sustainability scorecards. Sustainability scorecard results are published by the Office of Federal Sustainability.

Executive Order 13514 further mandated that at least 15 percent of existing federal buildings and leases should meet the Guiding Principles for Federal Sustainable Buildings by 2015, and that annual progress be made toward 100 percent conformance of all federal buildings, with a goal of 100% of all new federal buildings achieving zero-net-energy by 2030. The U.S. government is the largest consumer of energy in America. It has more than 350,000 buildings, and many of these buildings are energy-inefficient. Fifteen percent of 500,000 buildings is 75,000 buildings.

The Executive Order states that "the Federal Government must lead by example ... increase energy efficiency; measure, report, and reduce their greenhouse gas emissions from direct and indirect activities ... design, construct, maintain, and operate high performance sustainable buildings in sustainable locations; strengthen the vitality and livability of the communities in which Federal facilities are located; and inform Federal employees about and involve them in the achievement of these goals."

"Zero-net-energy building" is defined in Executive Order 13514 as "a building that is designed, constructed, and operated to require a greatly reduced quantity of energy to operate, meet the balance of energy needs from sources of energy that do not produce greenhouse gases, and therefore result in no net emissions of greenhouse gases and be economically viable."

== Details and timeline ==
The implementation of Executive Order 13514 was overseen by the Office of the Federal Environmental Executive. The name of the Office was subsequently changed to the Office of Federal Sustainability by Executive Order 13693.

Furthering the goals of Executive Order 13514, President Obama issued four additional Presidential Memoranda to increase building efficiency and create jobs by requiring agencies to complete $2 billion in Energy Savings Performance Contracts, to purchase biobased and renewable products, to purchase green fleet vehicles and to launch an EV pilot, and to purchase at least 20% renewable energy. Comprehensive Federal agency guidance and implementing instructions can be found on FedCenter.gov, an interagency resource hosted by the US Army Corps of Engineers.

Presidential Executive Actions Related to Executive Order 13514
| Executive Order | Issued By | Date Issued |
|---|---|---|
| EO 13514 on Federal Leadership in Environmental, Energy, and Economic Performance | President Obama | October 5, 2009 |
| Presidential Memorandum on Implementation of Energy Savings Projects and Performance-Based Contracting for Energy Savings | President Obama | December 2, 2011 |
| Presidential Memorandum on Driving Innovation and Creating Jobs in Rural America through Biobased and Sustainable Product Procurement | President Obama | February 12, 2012 |
| Presidential Memorandum on Federal Fleet Performance | President Obama | May 24, 2011 |
| Presidential Memorandum on Federal Leadership on Energy Management | President Obama | December 4, 2013 |

These Executive Orders and Presidential Memoranda build on more than 20 years of Presidential Executive Orders and Federal leadership in sustainability, beginning in 1993 when former President Bill Clinton established the Federal sustainability agenda and the Office of the Federal Environmental Executive with Executive Order 12873 which focused on eliminating waste and expanding the use of recycled materials. Former President George W. Bush expanded the scope of the Federal sustainability agenda and the role of the Federal Environmental Executive through Executive Order 13423, which added sustainable building, renewable energy, environmental management systems, and electronic waste recycling to the agenda. EO 13423 also created Presidential Awards for agency achievement in meeting the President's sustainability goals. Executive Order 13514, and subsequent Executive Orders including EO 13693, built on these foundations.

== Federal Agency Sustainability Plans ==
Under EO 13514, each Federal department and agency was required to submit and publish an annual Sustainability Plan. Agencies were also subsequently required to include Adaptation plans that outlined how each department and agency would respond to the challenges of climate change to secure their missions.

== GreenGov Symposium ==
In 2011, the Obama Administration established an annual symposium in partnership with George Washington University. The purpose of the GreenGov Symposium was to share successes and lessons learned across the Federal community and to foster publish-private partnerships to learn from leading corporate sustainability practices.

== Federal Agency Sustainability Scorecards ==
During the George W. Bush Administration, the White House Office of Management and Budget was tasked with responsibility for measuring the performance of the Federal departments and agencies towards achieving Federal sustainability goals. These performance scorecards were advanced by the Obama Administration and continue under the Trump Administration. Assisted by the United States Department of Energy Federal Energy Management Program, the Office of Management and Budget conducts an extensive data call each year to collect information about Federal department and agency energy use, water use, and other metrics. The results of these scorecards are published by the Office of Federal Sustainability (formerly called the Office of the Federal Environmental Executive).

== GreenGov Presidential Leadership Awards ==
Originally established by Executive Order 13423 under President George W. Bush, the GreenGov Presidential Leadership Awards recognized exceptional agency and team achievements towards realizing Federal sustainability goals. Federal sustainability achievements recognized through these awards included net zero building, EV fleets, and species conservation. A historical list of GreenGov Presidential Award recipients can be found at FedCenter.gov.

== Federal Sustainable Buildings and Net-Zero Goals ==
Specifically as related to Federal sustainable buildings and achieving net-zero-energy, goals can be summarized as follows:

- Green roofs are explicitly recommended for government buildings.
- Zero-net-energy goals are to be incorporated into the process of buying or leasing new government properties.
- Beginning fiscal year 2020 and thereafter, all new Federal buildings greater than 5000 gross square feet must be designed to achieve Zero-Net-Energy.
- Large government buildings were to start showing progress by 2015. More specifically, at least 15 percent of any agency's existing buildings and building leases above 5,000 gross square feet must conform to Zero-Net-Energy by Fiscal Year 2015. Ongoing improvement is required.
- Historic buildings may be retrofit to comply with the order.

== Implementation ==
According to a White House report of March 30, 2011:

- Over the two preceding years, "federal agencies have invested $5.8 billion in energy efficiency projects for federal buildings".
- The National Aeronautics and Space Administration (NASA) began building its NASA Ames Sustainability Base, with groundbreaking in August 2009. The base is an office complex with special features.
- The Department of Energy's National Renewable Energy Laboratory’s (NREL) new Research Support Facility opened. It is among the first large net zero energy buildings in the world, at 220,000 square feet (18,580 m^{2}). The facility generates as much energy as it uses, and includes solar arrays atop its adjacent parking garage and a number of new technologies, such as NREL- developed transpired solar collectors.

== Repeal ==
Executive Order 13514 was replaced by Executive Order 13693, titled Planning for Federal Sustainability in the Next Decade, issued by Obama on March 19, 2015. On May 17, 2018, U.S. President Donald Trump signed an executive order repealing Executive Order 13693, including all requirements to reduce greenhouse gas pollution. The Trump Executive Order maintains the Federal government's commitment to energy efficiency and to meeting all statutory requirements to reduce energy use, to conserve water, and to increase the use of renewable energy. All previous Federal Environmental Executives and Federal Chief Sustainability officers including those serving under former Presidents Clinton, Bush, and Obama joined to call on the Trump Administration to maintain the Federal government's commitment to sustainability.

== See also ==
- Energy conservation
- Net metering
