= ISIAQ =

Nonprofit organization in Santa Cruz, United States

International Society of Indoor Air Quality and Climate
- International Society of Indoor Air Quality and Climate
- Abbreviation: ISIAQ
- Formation: 1992
- Type: Scientific society
- Tax ID no.: 30-0509700
- Legal status: 501(c)(3) nonprofit organization
- Headquarters: Herndon, VA
- Location: United States
- Region served: Worldwide
- Members: 850
- Official language: English
- President: Ying Xu
- Staff: 2
- Website: www.isiaq.org

The International Society of Indoor Air Quality and Climate (ISIAQ) is a non-profit scientific organization seeking to advance and support the creation of healthy and comfortable indoor building environments. In 1992, the institution of ISIAQ was decided by a group of 109 international scientists and other multidisciplinary practitioners following the 5th International Conference on Indoor Air Quality and Climate (also known as Indoor Air '90) in Toronto, 1990.

== Journal ==
The society owns a journal, Indoor Environments ISSN 2950-3620, which is published by Elsevier. It formerly had Indoor Air, owned by Wiley, as its official journal, but the society ended that relationship after Wiley decided to move the journal to an open access model effective October 11, 2022 and the journal's editors resigned in response.

== Academy of Fellows ==
In 1991, the International Academy of Indoor Air Sciences (IAIAS) was founded to promote the practice of research and outstanding service of the indoor air sciences. The IAIAS merged with ISIAQ and changed into the Academy of Fellows in 2005.

Its members are composed of multidisciplinary and interdisciplinary scientists involved in all aspects of indoor air quality, government and regulatory, environmental and occupational health professionals, medical practitioners, engineers in the fields of construction and air-conditioning, architects and building owners and managers.
