= Potato processing industry =

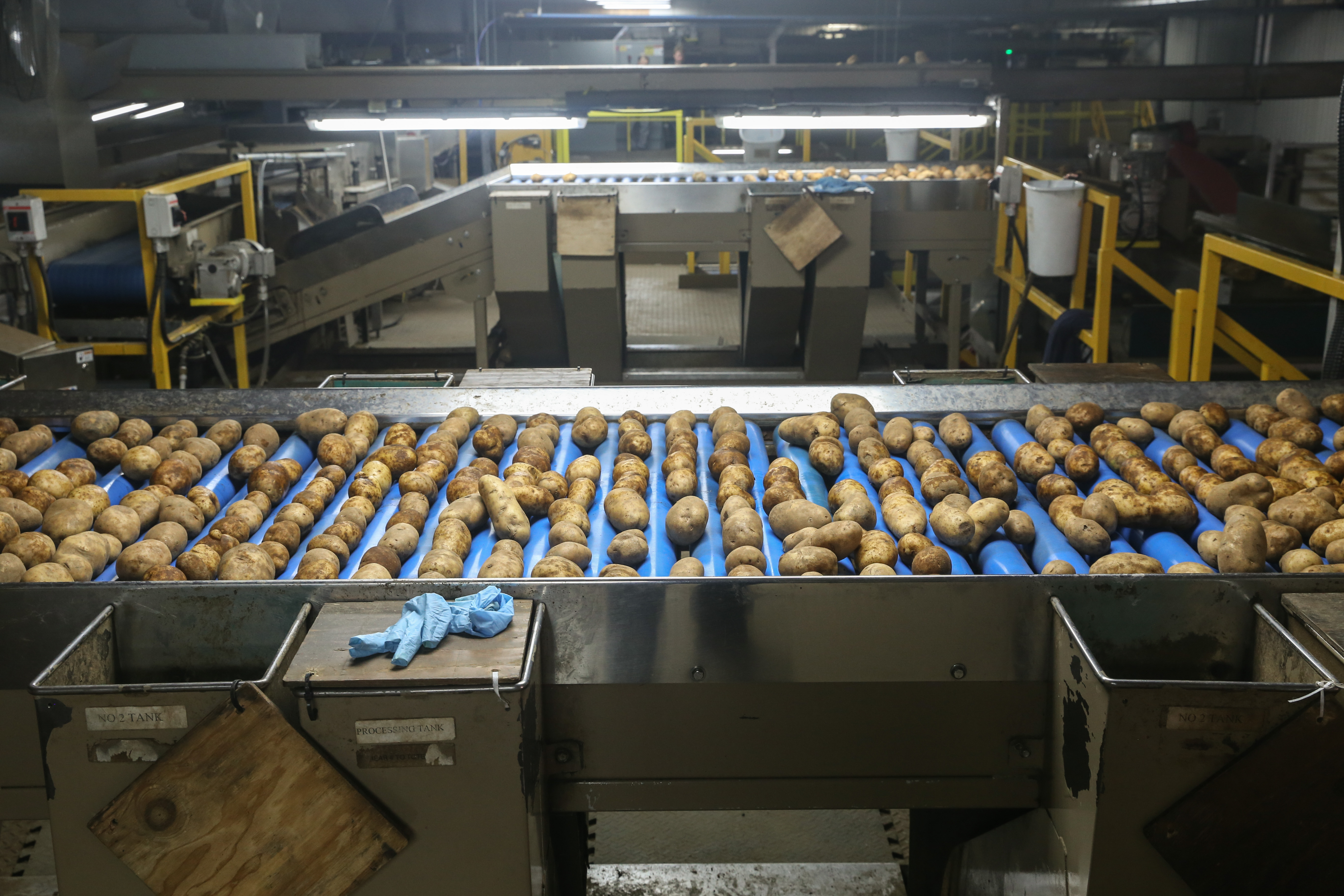
Potatoes being transported on a sorting line

The potato processing industry or potato processing market refers to the sector involved in transforming potatoes into various food products and by-products through different manufacturing processes. This industry plays a crucial role in meeting the global demand for potato-based foods, such as potato chips, french fries, mashed potatoes, and dehydrated potato products. The potato processing industry encompasses various activities, including cleaning, peeling, cutting, blanching, frying, freezing, and packaging. With its significant economic impact and contribution to the food industry, the potato processing industry serves as a vital link between potato growers, manufacturers, and consumers worldwide.

== History ==
Newsreel of 1 March 1969 in which Dutch subjects of a certain week are presented. The chips factory of Herman Megens in the industrial zone in Lomm. The potatoes are washed, peeled, sprayed clean, cut into sticks in cutting machines, pre-fried in ovens, dried, cooled and put into boxes. Also shots of a patatkraam (chips stand) in Venlo, where Megens started.

The origins of potato processing can be traced back to ancient times before Columbus arrived in the Americas. During this prehistoric period, Native Americans used drying techniques to preserve potatoes, reduce their size, and create flour and alcoholic beverages. As the potato became a widely consumed crop worldwide, processing methods were developed for various purposes. Initially, these methods were focused on providing sustenance for sailors and soldiers, but later expanded to meet the needs of aviation, convenience, and indulgence.

== Frozen potatoes ==
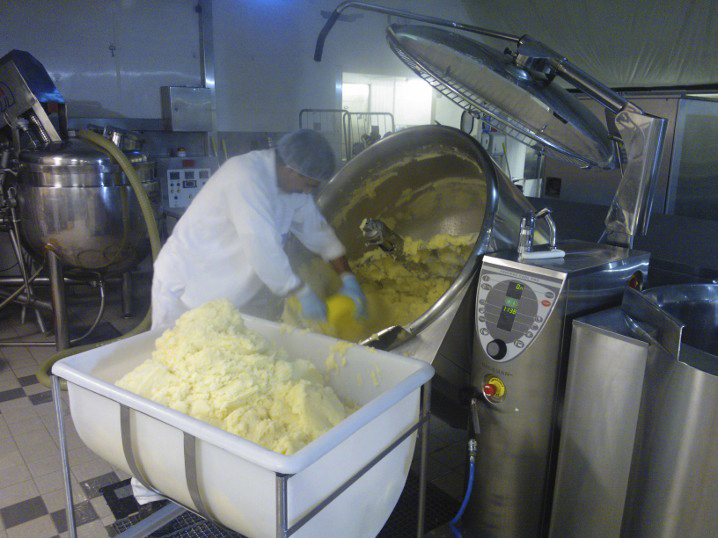
Industrial cooking of mashed potatoes in a steam-jacketed combi kettle

Frozen potatoes have been among the biggest types of processed potatoes which are consumed. This is due to the convenience they offer in terms of preparation time and flexibility. They have a long shelf life and the vitamins and other nutrients are preserved in them. Frozen potatoes, as well as the different products, are obtained by processing fresh potatoes with advanced equipment at very low temperatures. They are also available in different forms, such as hash brown, French fries, shapes and mashed potatoes and also in the form of topped or stuffed potatoes and other forms. The products are consumed either in fast-food restaurants or by individual customers who buy them in retail stores.

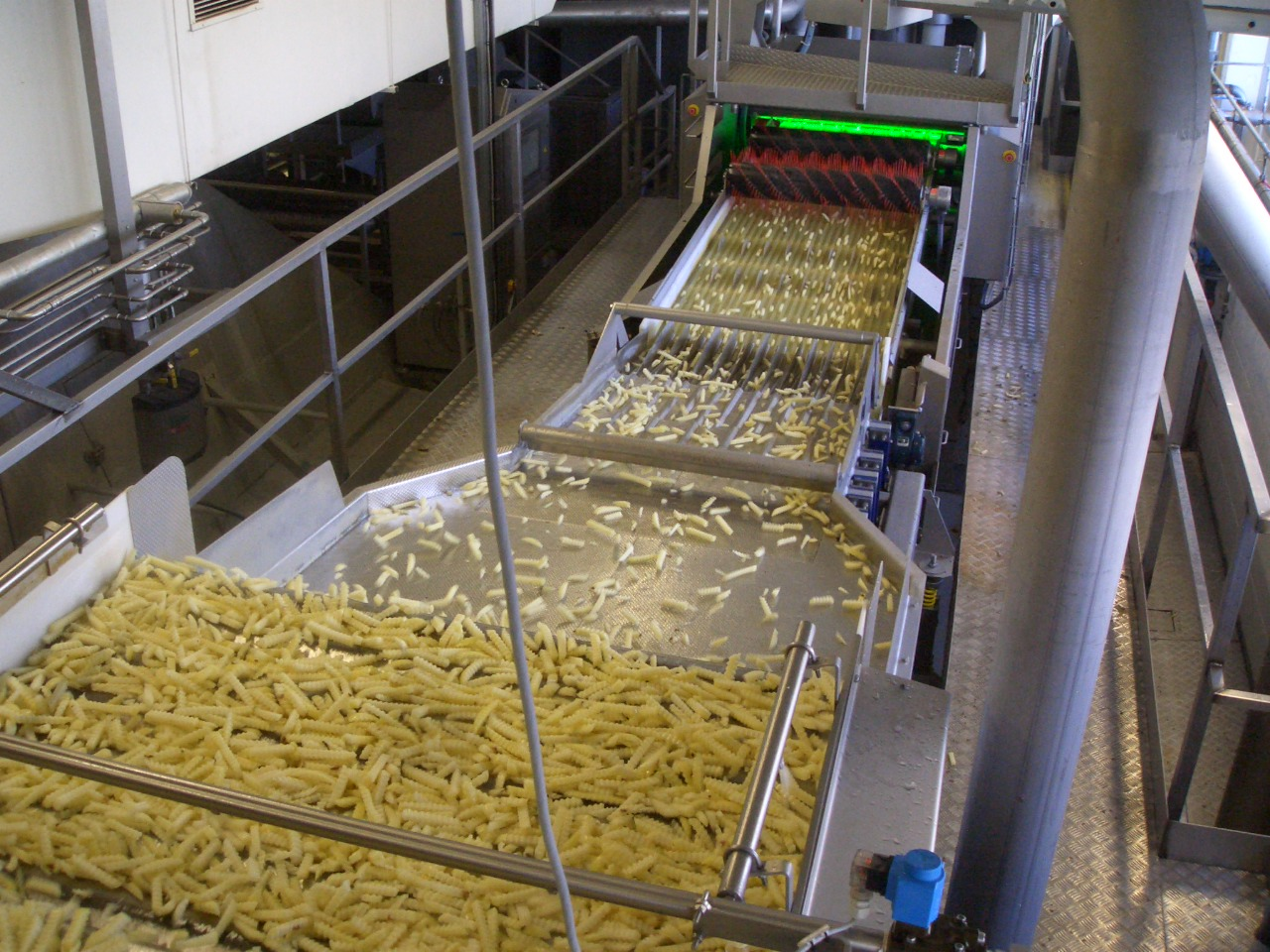
French fries sorting on a modern frozen potato manufacturing line

The Netherlands and Belgium are the two top producers of frozen potato products in Europe. Last year, Europe produced 3.8 billion euros worth of deep-frozen french fries. About one-third came from Dutch manufacturers (nearly 1.3 billion euros), which amounted to over 1.6 million tonnes, or a weekly supply of ten French fry cone holders of 175 grams per Dutch resident.

=== Largest frozen potato companies by production size and revenue ===
Company name	Founded	Production locations	Production size (tonnes)	Employees	Revenue
McCain Foods	1957	47 facilities		22,000 (2020)	▲$6.8 billion USD (2017)
Lamb Weston	1950	6 in Europe	0.8 million (by the 6 European plants)	7,200 (2018)	▲$3.4 billion USD (2018)
Aviko	1962				
Agrarfrost Holding GmbH & Co	1967				
Agristo NV	1985				
Globalfries	1966				
Simplot	1923				▲$6.0 billion USD (2020)
Cavendish	1980				
Ecofrost Inc.	2003				
Farm Frites International B.V.	1971	6	1.5 million	1,500	

=== Additional companies ===
- Kraft Heinz's Ore-Ida brand. The name "tater tot" is a registered trademark of the American frozen food company Ore-Ida, but is often used as a generic term.

== See also ==
- Food processing
- List of countries by potato production
- List of potato dishes
