= Energy Star =

US EPA program and certification

- Certification mark as used on various entities
- Founded: March 15, 1992; 34 years ago
- Founder: John S. Hoffman, U.S. EPA
- Area served: United States; Canada; Japan; Switzerland
- Parent: U.S. Department of Energy
- Website: energystar.gov

Energy Star (trademarked ENERGY STAR) is a voluntary energy-efficiency program established by the U.S. Environmental Protection Agency (EPA) in 1992.

The program is jointly administered by the EPA and the U.S. Department of Energy (DOE). In March 2026, the DOE was designated the lead federal agency, with the transfer of program responsibilities targeted for completion by July 2027.

Energy Star establishes energy efficiency specifications, and those that meet these specifications are eligible to display the Energy Star logo. More than 75 product categories are eligible for the Energy Star label, including appliances, electronics, lighting, heating and cooling systems, and commercial equipment such as food service products. In the United States, the Energy Star label often appears with the EnergyGuide label of eligible appliances to highlight energy-efficient products and compare energy use and operating costs.

The program has been one of the most successful voluntary initiatives introduced by the U.S. Federal Government. As of 2020 the program has saved 5 trillion kilowatt-hours of electricity, more than US$500 billion in energy costs, and prevented 4 billion metric tons of greenhouse gas emissions.

According to the EPA, more than 790,000 Americans were employed in manufacturing or installing Energy Star-certified products, based on employment estimates from the 2024 U.S. Energy and Employment Report. The 2026 report separately estimated that approximately 344,000 Americans worked in the broader energy-efficiency manufacturing sector in 2025.

Outside the United States, elements of the Energy Star program are implemented in Canada, Japan, and Switzerland. Previous international agreements, including those with the European Union and the European Free Trade Association, have expired.

== History ==
=== Establishment and early expansion (1992-2005) ===
The Energy Star program was established by the EPA in 1992 under Section 103(g) of the Clean Air Act (42 U.S.C. § 7403(g)). Initially a voluntary labeling initiative to promote energy-efficient products and help consumers identify them, the program first covered computers and displays. It has since expanded to include more than 75 product categories, as well as energy-efficient homes, commercial buildings, and industrial facilities.

As part of the program's early expansion, the EPA and the DOE signed a memorandum of cooperation in 1996 to coordinate efforts and expand the program's scope.

In 2000, the Consortium for Energy Efficiency (CEE) began conducting national household surveys to measure consumer awareness and understanding of the ENERGY STAR label and its influence on purchasing decisions.

In 2005, Congress formally authorized Energy Star through Section 131 of the Energy Policy Act of 2005, which added Section 324A to the Energy Policy and Conservation Act (42 U.S.C. § 6294a). The provision established the voluntary program within both the EPA and the DOE and required that responsibilities be divided according to applicable agreements between them.

The EPA develops and manages Energy Star Portfolio Manager, an online energy tracking and benchmarking tool for commercial buildings. The DOE manages Home Performance with Energy Star and provides technical support, including test procedure development for products and some verification testing of products.

=== Certification reforms (2009-2011) ===
Before 2011, Energy Star product qualification relied largely on manufacturers' self-reported data, a process that the Government Accountability Office (GAO) found to be vulnerable to fraud and abuse. In September 2009, the EPA and DOE signed a memorandum of understanding to strengthen Energy Star product qualification and verification procedures, including testing before qualification and expanded verification testing of certified products.

Later in 2010, the EPA established new third-party certification procedures, which took effect on January 1, 2011. Under these procedures, products seeking Energy Star qualification were required to undergo testing by EPA-recognized laboratories and certification by EPA-recognized certification bodies. Laboratories and certification bodies must meet EPA recognition requirements, including applicable accreditation and oversight criteria. In addition, a percentage of unique products in each category undergo annual post-market verification testing to confirm continued compliance with specifications. The EPA currently oversees more than twenty recognized certification bodies and more than 700 recognized laboratories. In 2023, 1,218 certified Energy Star product models completed verification testing, with an overall compliance rate of 94%.

=== Funding disputes and administrative transition (2017-2026) ===
In March 2017, the Trump Administration proposed eliminating federal funding for the Energy Star program as part of its fiscal year 2018 budget. The proposal drew opposition from environmental and energy-efficiency organizations, as well as businesses. In April 2017, more than 1,000 businesses and organizations signed a letter urging Congress to preserve and strengthen the program.

In May 2025, Trump administration officials reportedly announced plans to eliminate Energy Star as part of a broader reorganization of the EPA. The proposal drew opposition from environmental organizations, energy-efficiency advocates, and businesses, which highlighted the program's estimated annual energy cost savings of more than $40 billion compared with approximately $32 million in annual EPA funding.

In January 2026, Congress enacted bipartisan appropriations legislation providing at least $33 million for Energy Star for fiscal year 2026.

In March 2026, the administration announced plans to shift the program from the EPA to the DOE. A transition plan released on August 28, 2026, outlined the transfer of primary leadership to the DOE with the process targeted for completion by July 2027.

== Specifications ==
Energy Star specifications differ with each item and are set by the EPA.

=== Computers ===
Energy Star 4.0 specifications for computers became effective on July 20, 2007. The requirements are more stringent than the previous specification and existing equipment designs can no longer use the service mark unless re-qualified. They require the use of 80 Plus Bronze level or higher power supplies. Energy Star 5.0 became effective on July 1, 2009. Energy Star 6.1 became effective on September 10, 2014. Energy Star 7.1 became effective on November 16, 2018. The Version 8.0 specification for computers was finalized on October 15, 2019 and became effective on October 15, 2020.

=== Servers ===
The EPA released Version 1.0 of the Computer Server specifications on May 15, 2009. It covered standalone servers with one to four processor sockets. A second tier to the specification adding active state power and performance reporting for all qualified servers, as well as blade and multi-node server idle state requirements became effective December 16, 2013. The Version 2.0 Energy Star specification for Computer Servers came into effect on December 16, 2013. The Version 3.0 Energy Star specification for Enterprise Servers came into effect on June 17, 2019 .

=== Appliances ===
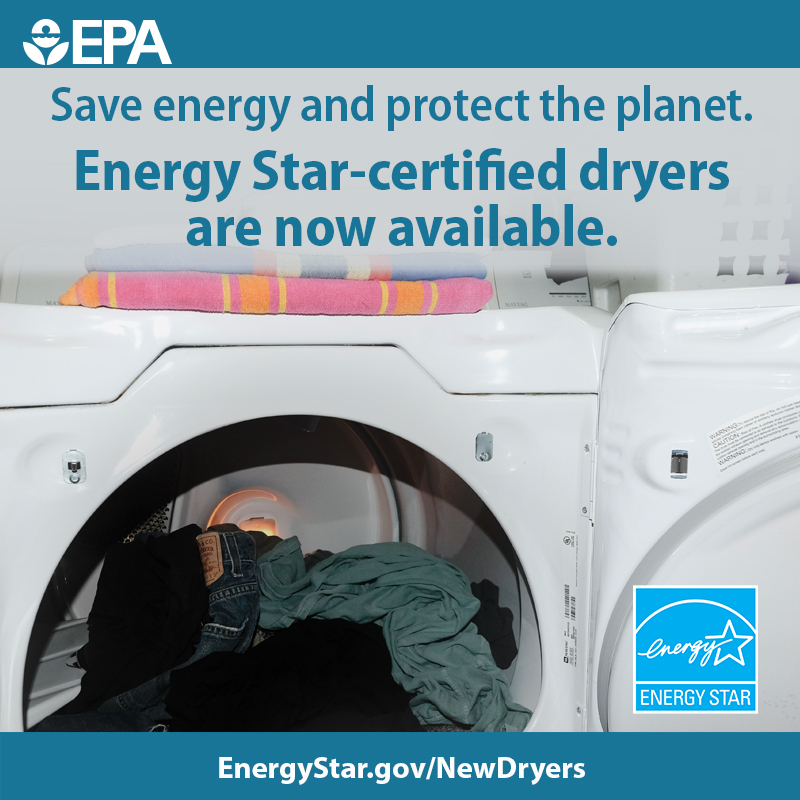
2015 advertisement promoting Energy Star-certified clothes dryers

As of early 2008, average refrigerators need 20% savings over the minimum standard. Dishwashers need at least 41% savings. Most appliances as well as heating and cooling systems have a yellow EnergyGuide label showing the annual cost of operation compared to other models. This label is created through the Federal Trade Commission and often shows if an appliance is Energy Star rated. While an Energy Star label indicates that the appliance is more energy efficient than the minimum guidelines, purchasing an Energy Star labeled product does not always mean one is getting the most energy efficient option available. For example, dehumidifiers that are rated under 25 US pints (12 L) per day of water extraction receive an Energy Star rating if they have an energy factor of 1.2 (higher is better), while those rated 25 US pints (12 L) to 35 US pints (17 L) per day receive an Energy Star rating for an energy factor of 1.4 or higher. Thus a higher-capacity but non-Energy Star rated dehumidifier may be a more energy efficient alternative than an Energy Star rated but lower-capacity model. The Energy Star program's savings calculator has also been criticized for unrealistic assumptions in its model that tend to magnify savings benefits to the average consumer.

Another factor yet to be considered by the EPA and DOE is the overall effect of energy-saving requirements on the durability and expected service life of a mass-market appliance built to a consumer-level cost standard. For example, a refrigerator may be made more efficient by the use of more insulative spacing and a smaller-capacity compressor using electronics to control operation and temperature. However, this may come at the cost of reduced interior storage (or increased exterior mass) or a reduced service life due to compressor or electronic failures. In particular, electronic controls used on new-generation appliances are subject to damage from shock, vibration, moisture, or power spikes on the electrical circuit to which they are attached. Critics have pointed out that even if a new appliance is energy efficient, any consumer appliance that does not provide customer satisfaction, or must be replaced twice as often as its predecessor contributes to landfill pollution and waste of natural resources used to construct its replacement.

=== Heating and cooling systems ===
Energy Star qualified heat pumps, boilers, air conditioning systems, and furnaces are available. In addition, cooling and heating bills can be significantly lowered with air sealing and duct sealing. Air sealing reduces the outdoor air that penetrates a building, and duct sealing prevents attic or basement air from entering ducts and lessening the heating/cooling system’s efficiency. Energy Star qualified room air conditioners are at least 10% more energy efficient than the minimum U.S. federal government standards.

=== Home electronics ===
Energy Star qualified televisions use 30% less energy than average. In November 2008, television specifications were improved to limit on-mode power use, in addition to standby power which is limited by the current specifications. Standby power consumption for televisions must be 3 watts or less. A wider range of Energy Star qualified televisions will be available. Energy Star recommends the use of IEEE 1621 human interface guidelines regarding power controls in televisions.

Other qualified home electronics include cordless phones, battery chargers, VCRs and external power adapters, most of which use 90% less energy.

=== Imaging equipment ===
The Energy Star Program Requirements for Imaging Products are focused on product families such as electrophotographic (EP) printers, inkjet printers (e.g., thermal), copiers, facsimile machines and other imaging equipment including MFD's (multifunctional devices). Typical Electrical Consumption (TEC) of a product family are measured and reported against an allowance set by the maximum throughput of the device. Operation modes (OM) are measured and reported for devices such as inkjet products against an allowance set by the functions present in the EUT (equipment under test). Devices that included "adders" such as Ethernet, on-board memory, wireless, etc. are mathematically "added" to increase the OM allowance. On February 1, 2011, the EPA/DOE added the requirement that all products registered under the Energy Star service mark, must be tested by an AB (Accredited Body) or CB (Certification Body) Laboratory.

=== Lighting ===
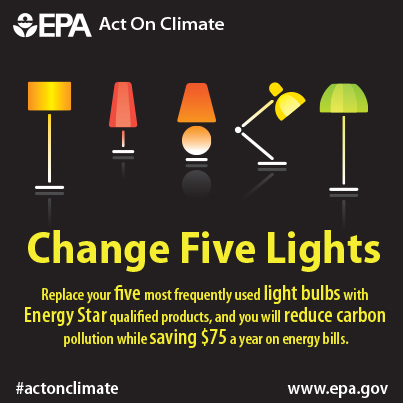
EPA graphic promoting light bulb replacement

The Energy Star is awarded to only certain bulbs that meet strict efficiency, quality, and lifetime criteria. Energy Star qualified fluorescent lighting uses 75% less energy and lasts up to ten times longer than normal incandescent lights.

Energy Star Qualified light-emitting diode (LED) Lighting:

- Reduces energy costs — uses only 20–25% of the electricity that incandescent bulbs use, and last as much as 25 times as long. LEDs use 25%-30% of the amount of energy as halogen incandescent bulbs, and last 8–25 times as long.
- Reduces cooling costs — LEDs produce very little heat.

To qualify for Energy Star certification, LED lighting products must pass a variety of tests to prove that the products will display the following characteristics:

- Brightness is equal to or greater than existing lighting technologies (incandescent or fluorescent) and light is well distributed over the area lighted by the fixture.
- Light output remains constant over time, only decreasing towards the end of the rated lifetime (at least 35,000 hours or 12 years based on use of 8 hours per day).
- Excellent color quality. The shade of white light appears clear and consistent over time.
- Efficiency is as good as or better than fluorescent lighting.
- Light comes on instantly when turned on.
- No flicker when dimmed.
- No off-state power draw. The fixture does not use power when it is turned off, with the exception of external controls, whose power should not exceed 0.5 watts in the off state.

=== New Homes ===
New homes or apartments that earn the Energy Star label have been verified to meet energy efficiency requirements set by U.S. EPA. Energy Star certified homes are at least 10% more efficient than homes built to code and achieve a 20% improvement on average, while providing homeowners with better quality, performance, and comfort. Nearly 1.9 million Energy Star certified homes and apartments have been certified to date. These high-performing homes can be found across the U.S. and include a complete thermal enclosure system, a high-efficiency heating, ventilation and cooling system, a comprehensive water management system, and energy-efficient lighting and appliances. Together, U.S. homeowners living in certified homes saved $360 million on their energy bills in 2016 alone. In 2020, Energy Star separated single-family and multifamily construction types into their own programs: Single-Family New Construction (SFNC) and Multifamily New Construction (MFNC).

A new tier of Energy Star certification, called the Energy Star NextGen Certified Homes and Apartments, would be launched in 2023. This new certification uses a baseline of the Energy Star Single-Family and Multifamily certification, with additional requirements such as heat pump water heaters and EV-ready charging capabilities.

== Energy performance ratings ==
The Energy Star program has developed energy performance rating systems for several commercial and institutional building types and manufacturing facilities. These ratings, on a scale of 1 to 100, provide a means for benchmarking the energy efficiency of specific buildings and industrial plants against the energy performance of similar facilities. The ratings are used by building and energy managers to evaluate the energy performance of existing buildings and industrial plants. The rating systems are also used by EPA to determine if a building or plant can qualify to earn Energy Star recognition. In 2020 Energy Star released an updated guide for verifying Energy Star certifications.

Energy Star ratings have been compared to other clean energy rating systems and green building certification systems such as those by independent firms like MiQ, or LEED certifications for office buildings.

=== Buildings ===
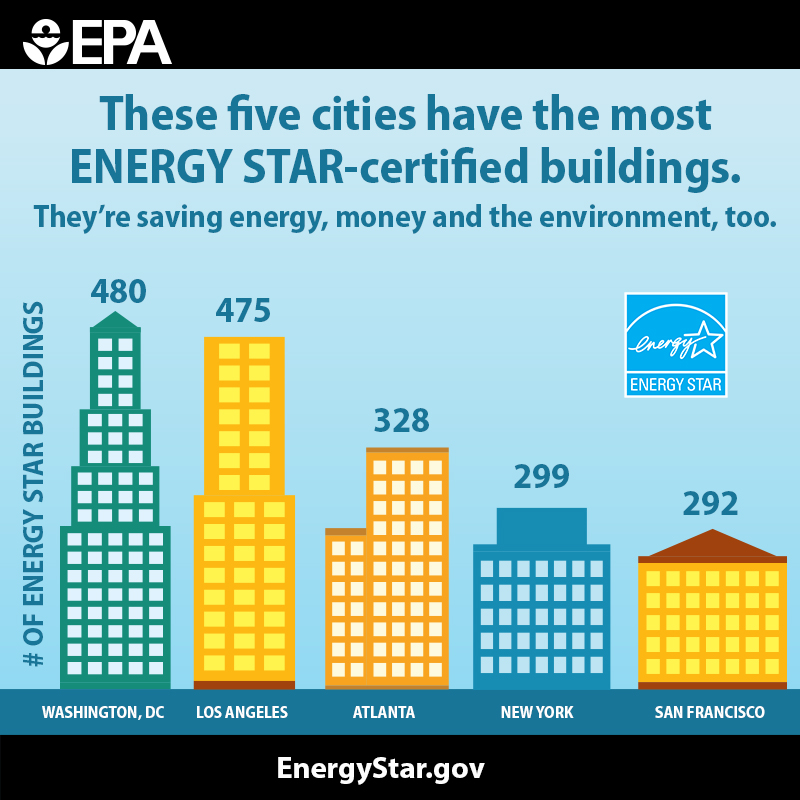
2015 graph showing cities with the most Energy Star-certified buildings

The number of space types that can receive the energy performance rating in Portfolio Manager is expanding and now includes housing, bank/financial institutions, courthouses, hospitals (acute care and children's), hotels and motels, houses of worship, K-12 schools, medical offices, offices, residence halls/dormitories, retail stores, supermarkets, warehouses (refrigerated and non-refrigerated), hotels, data centers, senior care facilities, and wastewater facilities.

Models used in the rating system provide detailed information on the methodologies used to create the energy performance ratings including details on rating objectives, regression techniques, and the steps applied to compute a rating. Energy Star maintains a 1–100 national benchmarking rating for buildings based on building attributes depending on the category, including floor area, occupancy and energy consumption data into a free online tool provided by Energy Star.

Energy Star energy performance ratings have been incorporated into some green buildings standards, such as LEED for Existing Buildings. In the U.S., builders of energy efficient homes are able to qualify for Federal Income tax credits and deductions.

Energy Star estimated in 2020 that energy use in commercial buildings accounts for 20% of greenhouse gas emissions, costing more than $100B per year.

=== Industrial facilities ===
Some examples of specialised industrial facilities which Energy Star has designed specific performance ratings for include:

- Automobile assembly plants
- Cement plants
- Corn mills
- Container glass manufacturing
- Flat glass manufacturing
- Potato processing plants
- Juice processing
- Petroleum refineries
- Pharmaceutical manufacturing plants

== Adoption in building codes ==
The current and projected status of energy codes and standards adoption is show in the maps at the link.

The following cities have mandatory reporting requirements:

- Atlanta, Georgia
- Austin, Texas
- Boston, Massachusetts
- Minneapolis, Minnesota
- New York, New York
- Philadelphia, Pennsylvania
- San Francisco, California
- Seattle, Washington
- Washington, DC

== See also ==
- ASUE (Germany)
- Bureau of Energy Efficiency (India)
- Energy performance certificate
- EnerWorks
- Ecodesign Directive
- European Union energy label
- Green computing
- Green energy
- Nationwide House Energy Rating Scheme (Australia)
- Miscellaneous electric load
- One Watt Initiative
- Plug load
- Power management
- Weatherization
