= ASUE =

ASUE, Asue, or Asué may refer to:

== People ==
- Asue Ighodalo, Nigerian lawyer
- Francisco Pascual Obama Asue, former prime minister of Equatorial Guinea
- Luís Asué (born 2001), Equatoguinean football forward

== Other uses ==
- ASUE (Germany) - Germany's Association for the Efficient and Environmentally Friendly Use of Energy
- Arizona State University's Eastern campus
- A Series of Unfortunate Events, a children's book series written by Lemony Snicket
- Sou-sou, or Esusu, a traditional method of saving money in Africa and the West Indies
