= ENERPOS =

Net-zero energy building in Réunion, France

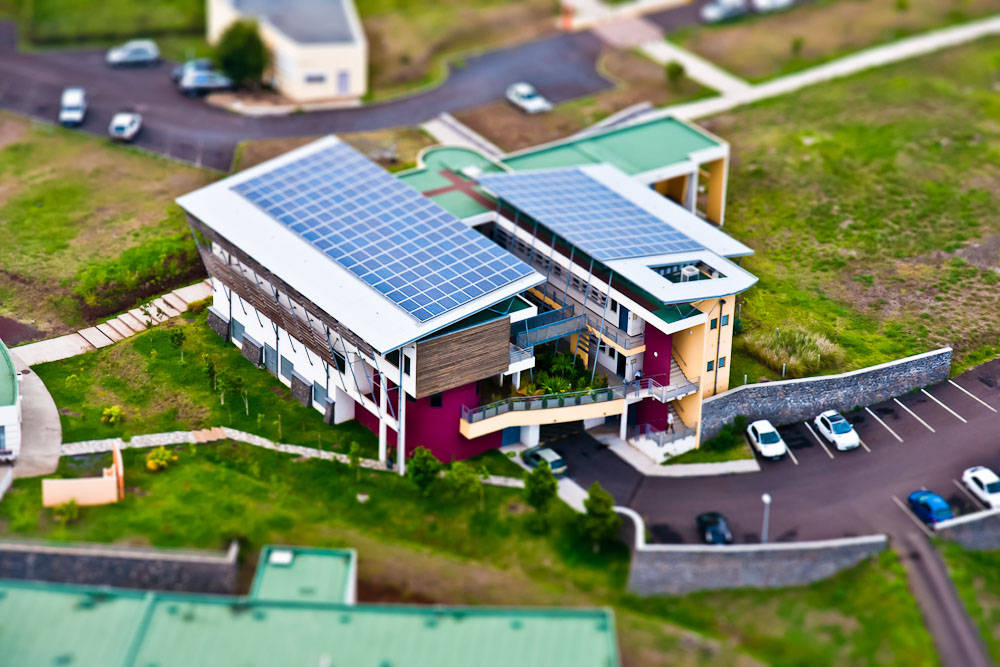

- Location within Réunion
- Etymology: French: Énergie positive

General information
- Type: Educational
- Location: Saint-Pierre, France
- Coordinates: 21.340846°S 55.490897°E
- Opened: 2008; 18 years ago
- Cost: $1.7 million
- Owner: University of Reunion Island

Technical details
- Floor area: 739 m^{2} (7,950 sq ft)

ENERPOS is the first educational net-zero energy building in the tropics and one of the 13 Net ZEBs in the tropics thanks to its bioclimatic design. Its name comes from the French "énergie positive" ("positive energy" in English). ENERPOS is located on Réunion Island, a French territory in the Indian Ocean. Building an energy-efficient building in such a climate is particularly challenging, but the energy expectations with regard to ENERPOS have been reached, even largely exceeded. ENERPOS is not only an energy-efficient building but also displays various passive methods to reduce energy consumption while providing a comfortable environment for its users. Classes are hosted for both undergraduate diploma and degree courses as well as for the Department of Construction and Energy at the Graduate Engineering School of Réunion Island.

== Location ==
ENERPOS is a university building located in Saint-Pierre on the French island of La Réunion. This island, whose climate is hot and humid, is located in the Indian Ocean, to the east of Madagascar. This area is also often struck by tropical cyclones, generating building difficulties.

== Context of Réunion Island ==
Over 800,000 inhabitants of Réunion Island rely on a limited supply of energy. In addition to that, electricity production on Réunion Island is one of the most polluting on earth, mainly generated from fossil fuels such as coal and fuel. The electricity produced is expensive and is one of the most polluting in the world with 820 grams (29 oz) of CO_{2} produced with every kilowatt hour (close to eight times more than in mainland France). Unfortunately, the ever-increasing demand for energy, due to significant demographic growth, sometimes exceeds the amount of energy available. As a consequence, shortages can occur certain times during austral summers when air conditioning is widely used.

As is the case in other parts of the world, the electricity consumption of buildings represents a significant percentage of the energy used on Réunion Island. Buildings in French Tropical zones, and especially on Réunion Island, have often been awkwardly designed, contrary to former Creole vernacular architecture, importing metropolitan building concepts. Indeed, it has been common practice to build as cheaply as possible for decades, without any consideration for the environment and the climate, making it uncomfortable to live in without air conditioning. Moreover, air conditioning and lighting are usually oversized by designers, this leads to wasteful energy consumption. The good news is that considerable improvements can be made in reducing energy consumption in the field of building on Réunion Island.

== Goal and achievements ==
Under the general context of energy supply and consumption on Réunion Island, this building was expected to be net-zero energy and to export at least as much energy as its consumption to the polluting electricity grid of the island. To achieve this goal, the first issue to be addressed is the energy consumption of the building and how to build without using air conditioning, a considerable consumer, while providing a comfortable environment for the users. Air conditioning is only used in one-third of the total surface area for computers and servers, the remaining two-thirds are cooled and ventilated naturally. Passive methods are used, requiring people to be active instead of being passive in an active building (François Garde, Ph.D., P.E. and ASHRAE member). At the beginning of the design of ENERPOS in 2005, the main aim was to demonstrate that the overall consumption of the building could be reduced by three times compared to that of a standard building. The result is that only one-seventh of the annual energy consumption of a standard building is used – 14 kilowatt-hours per square metre (4.7 MJ/sq ft) instead of 100 kWh/m^{2} (33 MJ/sq ft) in a year. To compensate for this, photovoltaic panels are implemented over the rooftops, enabling the production of 71,118 kilowatt-hours (256,020 MJ) in 2010 compared to an overall consumption of 9,824 kWh (35,370 MJ), making this building one of the 13 Net ZEBs in a tropical climate. Saint Pierre is usually sunny all year and receives a heavy amount of solar radiation with up to 1.2 kilowatts per square metre (0.15 hp/sq ft) in summer. Consequently, the building consumes 7 times less energy than its production, the extra production of electricity being released into the grid.

ENERPOS meets the requirements of the following two performance labels, HQE and PERENE. PERENE is a local label in Réunion Island guiding those wishing to abide by it on how to build in harmony with the corresponding climate (four different classifications are defined depending mainly on the altitude), Saint Pierre being in the hottest zone of the island.

== Principles and features ==
=== Natural cross ventilation ===
Human comfort depends on five criteria, two of which concern one’s clothing and metabolism, and three others which focus on air temperature, air humidity and airflow speed. The faster the airflow is on someone the cooler he feels. Moreover, natural ventilation brings sound fresh air into the building when well-designed. Thus, natural ventilation tends to increase comfort as well as health in tropical climates and aims to suppress air conditioning.

The building has been orientated to prevent strong East-South-East trade winds from entering the rooms in winter and still benefit from thermal breezes in summer. The main façades are then orientated North and South, reducing the heat gain on the Western and Southern façades (which are more exposed to solar radiation) at the same time.

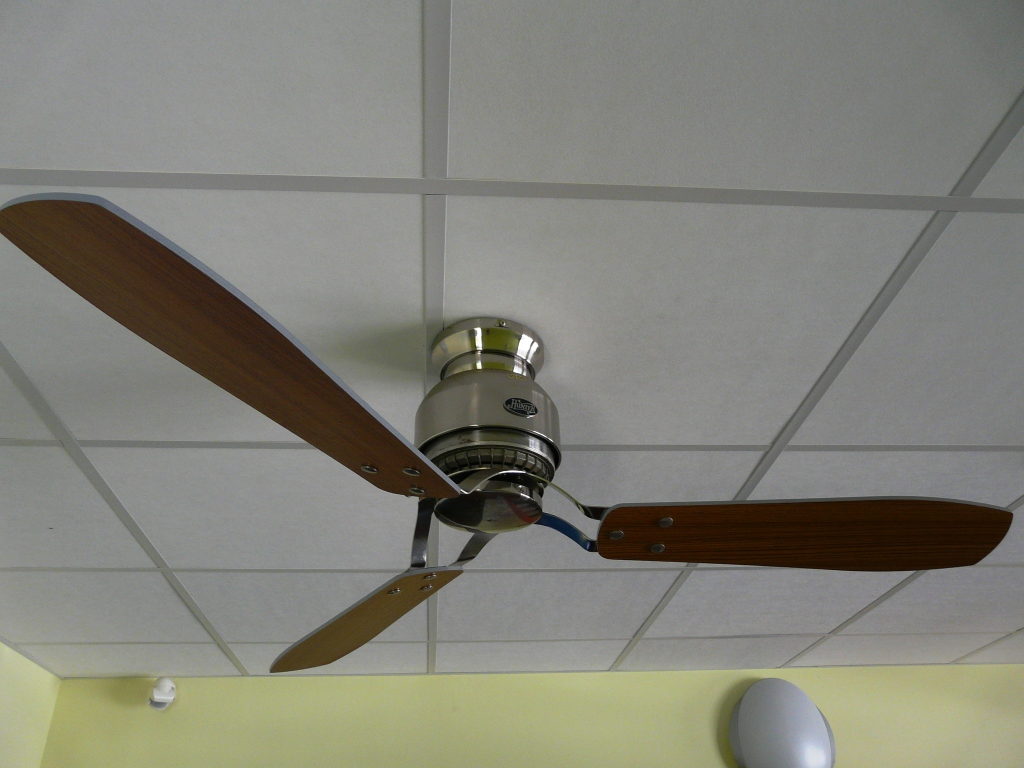
A ceiling fan used in ENERPOS

Successful ventilation has been obtained by creating a window to wall ratio of 30% using louvres on both opposite sides of the rooms. Louvres are not only useful to regulate the airflow but also to protect against cyclones and break-ins. In addition to that, the surroundings of the building have been well-thought-out to prevent the ground from heating before entering the rooms:

- Planting native plants and trees in the patio and around the building to create a microclimate which is as fresh as possible.
- Placing car parks under the building instead of next to it for the same reason. Furthermore, it increases soil permeability so that tropical rains do not cause floods but penetrate the ground.

Finally, large ceiling fans are installed in every room, even those using air conditioning. Ceiling fans ensure that even in the absence of the necessary breezes, the airflow needed to feel comfortable in the room is provided for the users. This solution significantly reduces the amount of energy consumed. The overall consumption of the ceiling fans and the split system (the latter used to cool the technical rooms) is only 3.7 kilowatt-hours per square metre (1.2 MJ/sq ft) per year compared to a classic air conditioning system in a standard building consuming 80 kWh/m (88 MJ/ft) per year.

=== Solar shading ===
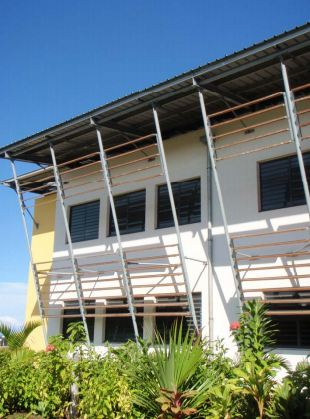
A shadow on the facade due to solar shading

Now that the airflow parameter has been dealt with, the next issue to be addressed is air temperature. Most of the heat gained in the rooms is due to solar radiation coming through the glazing.

Barely any glazing has been placed on the Western and Eastern small façades because they are the most likely to receive solar radiation. The two main façades, including the louvres, are protected against direct sun rays thanks to vertical solar shading composed of inclined wooden strips. To be as efficient as possible, solar shading has been simulated with 3-D software. This glazing protection has two main effects: to prevent glare on the desks, which can be very annoying for the students and the employees working in ENERPOS; and to decrease indoor temperature.

=== Materials ===
Concerning the envelope, the walls are made of concrete; the roofing is insulated with a 10-centimetre (3.9 in) layer of polystyrene and a ventilated BIPV (Building Integrated Photovoltaic) over-roof; the solar shading systems are made of wooden strips; the east and west gables are insulated with mineral wood and wooden cladding. The paint used is completely organic and the wooden components have not undergone any specific treatment. No insulation is required on the main facades as they are very efficient in terms of S-value due to the solar shading.

=== Lighting ===
Daylighting has also been simulated to ensure a Useful Daylight Index (UDI) of at least 90% in most places. Two classrooms facing the sea on the first floor of the building do not have any artificial lighting. Except for those two classrooms, all classrooms and offices are lit by low energy consumption lights producing an artificial lighting density inferior to that of a standard building, 7 watts per square metre (0.00087 hp/sq ft) in the classrooms with low energy T-5 lights and 3.7 W/m^{2} (0.00046 hp/sq ft) in the offices with personal LED desks lamps. These lighting densities are high enough to make these workplaces comfortable to work in and yet reduce both the energy consumption and the thermal heat gain produced by the lights in so far as is possible. There are multiple switches to control the lights and ceiling fans by the rows of tables in the classrooms since some people could feel hot or do not have enough light while others are comfortable. This avoids wasting electricity.

A Building Management System is used to control the active systems. In the event of people forgetting to turn off the light when leaving a room, a timer will turn off lights automatically after two hours.

=== Computing ===
This is similar to the lighting issue as computing systems can affect both energy consumption and thermal heat gain greatly. The main solution adopted in the offices is to use laptops rather than desktop computers since they usually consume less electricity. As for the computer rooms, they are only equipped with screens, mice and keyboards and all central units are located in the air-conditioned technical room. The thermal loads from the computers are thus kept outside the computing rooms.

=== Photovoltaic production ===
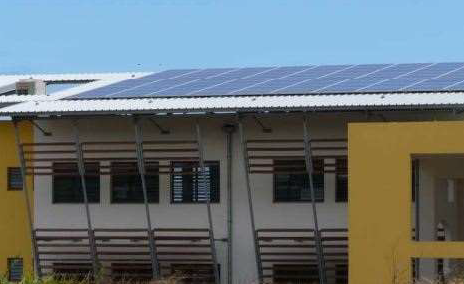
Photovoltaic panels on the roof

As previously explained is, the city of Saint Pierre receives a huge amount of solar radiation throughout the year. This natural source of energy has consequently been exploited. The target is to make ENERPOS a positive energy building thanks to solar panels, the PV production must be at least equal to the energy consumption of the building.

Since the photovoltaic panels have been used as an over-roof, the overall surface of the panels has been oversized compared to the energy needs to protect the whole roof from direct sun rays. The low energy consumption of ENERPOS is more than balanced by 365 square metres (3,930 sq ft) of these integrated solar panels, generating a total production of 71,118 kilowatt-hours (256,020 MJ) over one year. The resulting surplus of energy, not being consumed by the building but released into the grid instead, is then up to 61 kilowatt-hours (220 MJ) in a year.

Furthermore, all of the costs and risks of this installation are provided by the manufacturer, as agreed in the contract, and not by the owner of ENERPOS (that is to say the University of Réunion Island). In exchange, the University of Réunion Island rents the photovoltaic production to the manufacturer who receives the benefit of the electricity fed into the grid for 15 years. After that period, the owner of the building becomes the owner of the PV panels.

== Making the users active ==
The energy consumption of a building not only relies on the way it has been built but also mainly on occupant behaviour. This idea is all the more true for buildings being constructed based on passive designs. Indeed, making ENERPOS a passive building implies that people need to be active to use it to its full capacity.

For example, before turning on the ceiling fans of a classroom, the students have to open the louvres first. It seems to be common sense but as a matter of fact, people do not think about that most of the time. That is why signs are displayed in the rooms explaining how to use a classroom properly to avoid wasting energy. The purpose is to educate students (and teachers) about the way to behave and to make them realize the environmental issues at stake on Réunion Island.

== Post-occupancy evaluation ==
Since ENERPOS is a pioneer project on Réunion Island and in the tropics, it is essential to analyze the consumption distribution, the performance and how people feel in this building. Therefore, a post-occupancy evaluation has been carried out for three hot seasons to assess the comfort level in ENERPOS. Students and teachers were asked to fill in a questionnaire about how they feel in the building while environmental parameters, such as temperatures, humidity and air velocity, were collected.

The main conclusion is that out of 700 students surveyed, the vast majority feel comfortable in ENERPOS in the hot season without any air conditioning. The ultimate objective of this project has then been met.

== Results ==
Energy	Percentage
Plug loads	46%
Air conditioning, mechanical ventilation	15%
Interior lighting	14%
Ceiling fans	11%
Exterior lighting	7%
Elevator	7%

Among the annual 14.4 kilowatt-hours per square metre (4.8 MJ/sq ft) consumption of ENERPOS, the energy end uses are listed in the table.

The contribution of the plug loads to the overall energy consumption is abnormally high compared to a standard building because the air conditioning and lighting parts have been well reduced.

To conclude, the ENERPOS building shows that it is possible to build an educational Net ZEB in the tropics while providing a comfortable environment for people to work and study in. Moreover, the lessons learnt about the ENERPOS project can be applied to green building and Net ZEB projects in hot climates.

== See also ==
- Autonomous buildings
- Building-integrated photovoltaics
- Category:Low-energy building
- Energy conservation
- Green building
- Home energy monitor
- Plug load
- Sustainable design
- Net-zero energy building
