= Energy efficiency in Pennsylvania =

Energy efficiency, or efficient energy use, describes an optimization of the power requirements and environmental impacts of energy systems. This includes actions taken by a governing body to decrease power use over an entire power grid, or actions taken by individuals to make their energy use in their house less wasteful. It is also one of the easiest and most cost effective ways to fight climate change and air pollution.

Sustainable energy policy was first standardized in Pennsylvania in 1999, and since then 93 financial incentives and regulatory policies have been passed to refine energy efficiency in the state. Government-run incentive programs are used to encourage homeowners to save money and reduce their energy consumption. Pennsylvania passed the flagship energy efficiency bill Act 129 in 2008 that includes incorporating rebate programs for tune-ups of heating and cooling systems. As of 2019, Act 129 has helped save 8.8 million MWh (Mega Watt hours) of electricity, valued at $6.4 billion. Act 129 also created a commission on energy efficiency and conservation that would help implement and track progress made in accordance with the bill.

== History ==
Following a 1996 law on electricity systems in Pennsylvania, four Sustainable Energy Funds (SEFs) were created to advance clean, renewable, and efficient energy production and consumption.

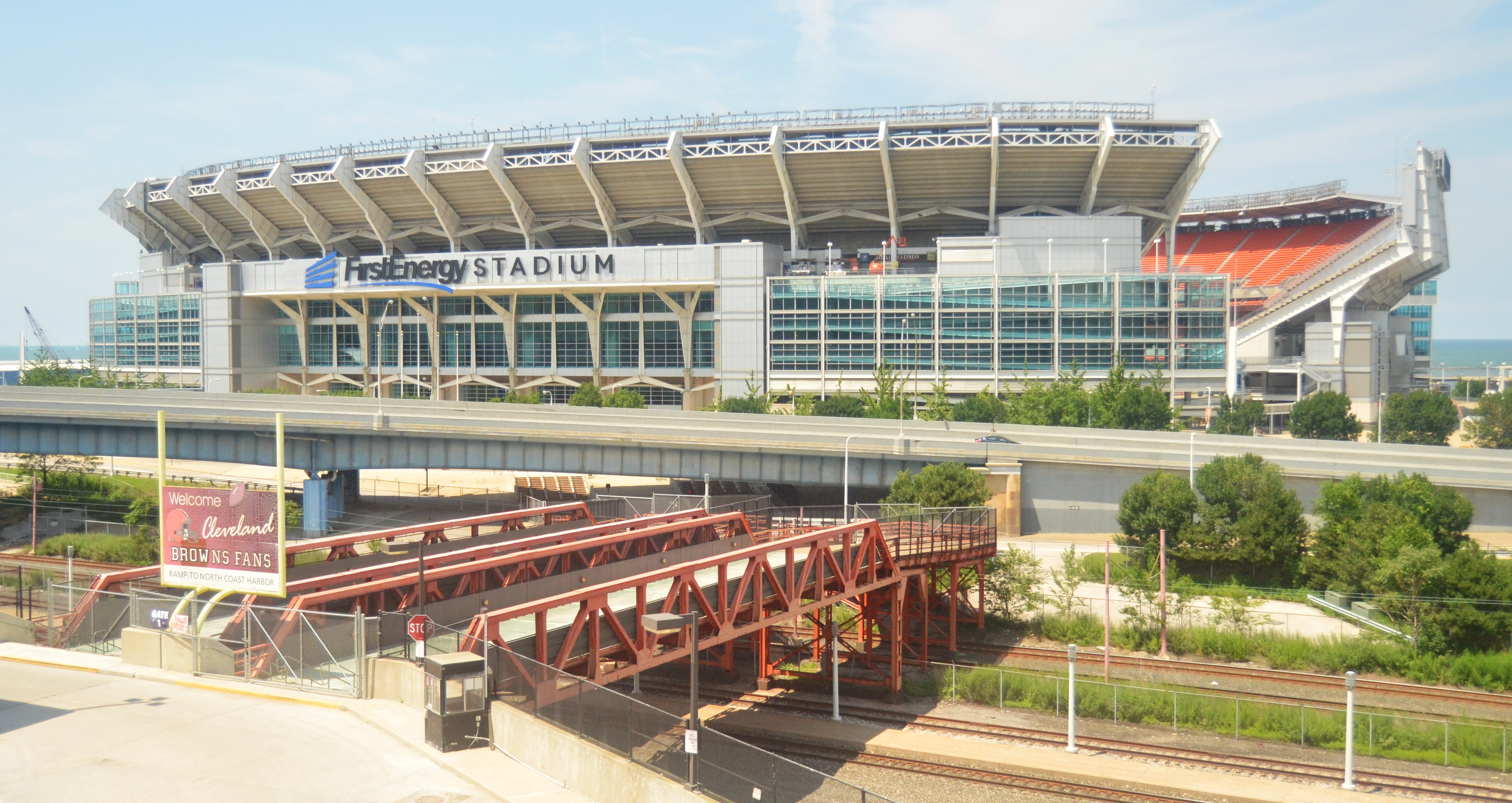
The FirstEnergy Stadium. The Metropolitan Edison Company, one of the Sustainable Energy Funds created in 1996, merged with FirstEnergy in 2001, alongside the Pennsylvania Power Company (image below). FirstEnergy is regulated by Act 129.

In 1999 the Pennsylvania Sustainability Energy Board was created to standardize policy and facilitate cooperation between Pennsylvania's energy agencies.

In 2002 Pennsylvania enacted a program permitting homeowners to take out additional mortgage loans on a property for the purpose of increasing energy efficiency twofold or less.

Between 2002 and 2006, 25 policies were passed with the function of providing financial incentives to improve clean and energy efficiency.

In 2005 the Pennsylvania Public Utility Commission (PUC) put into action a law on net metering, requiring all energy companies to offer forward credit on energy bills for homes with their own power generation. This policy mainly targeted home solar generation.

In late 2009, the most recent Uniform Construction Code (2009 UCC) established an enforceable benchmark on energy standards.

Between 2014 and 2017 FirstEnergy (previously the Metropolitan Edison Company), one of the four SEFs created in 1996, awarded 22 grants and loans for various energy efficiency improvements and audits. All but two of these actions were taken during 2015 and 2016. The most common energy efficiency upgrade was to LED lighting.

== Utility companies ==
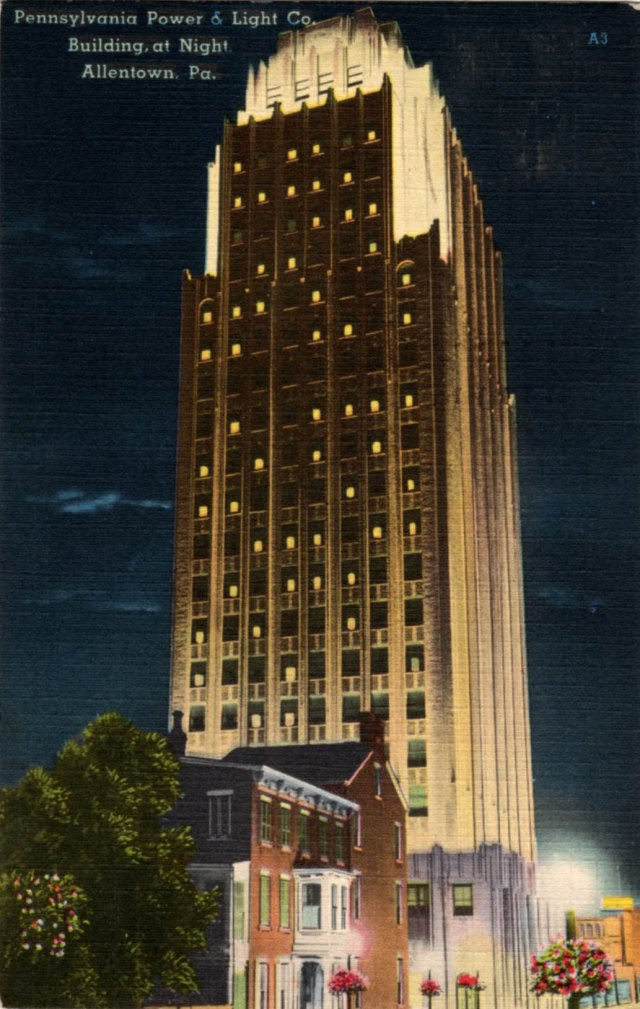
The Pennsylvania Power Company (PPC) tower in Allentown, image from 1935. PPC, now FirstEnergy, is one of the largest electrical distribution companies in Pennsylvania, and is one of many regulated companies subject to Act 129.

Home energy efficiency is the main focus of Act 129, but it also has implementation goals related directly to electricity distribution companies (ECDs).

It sets out goals for ECDs to meet, and requires ECDs to compile quarterly reports on the commissions directives, develop and file plans to increase efficiency and conservation, create a plan to upgrade the technology used to meter homes, and created a registry of conservation service providers to give management and advisory services to ECDs to help with energy efficiency implementation.

The directive also outlined ways for the commission to track ECDs progress towards their goals, releasing a long technical reference manual in 2009, which has been continually updated all the way through 2021.

Most ECDs are opting to meet these efficiency standards by updating their technology. Replacing heating pumps, giving more midstream delivery options, and installing smart meter technology throughout the state. By increasing efficiency at the energy plants and giving more data with smart meters to the ECDs, they have been able to increase efficiency.

With an estimated 8.8 million MWh saved from this policy alone, Act 129 is seen as a success by policy makers, and serves as a guide for other states on how to update their energy efficiency policy.

== Consumer and residential energy incentive programs ==
In Pennsylvania, there are many opportunities for homeowners, building owners, vehicle owners and business owners to receive incentives and rebates to improve their energy efficiency. It is estimated that 10,000 kWh ($2,000) of electricity is used every year by the average PA residential home, but that number can be lowered with efficiency upgrades.

Typically, simple steps can be taken to reduce energy consumption, but large renovations that will yield high savings are typically quite expensive. Government programs that provide financial assistance and other resources encourage them.

- The Pennsylvania Low-Income Usage Reduction Program (LIURP) is state mandated, and provides resources to low-income households to install energy efficient technologies for heating and electricity.
- The Homeowners Energy Efficiency Loan Program (HEELP) is a Pennsylvania state run program that provides fixed rate 1 percent interest loans to homeowners who need money to conduct energy efficiency renovations. Loans of up to $20,000 can be taken out.

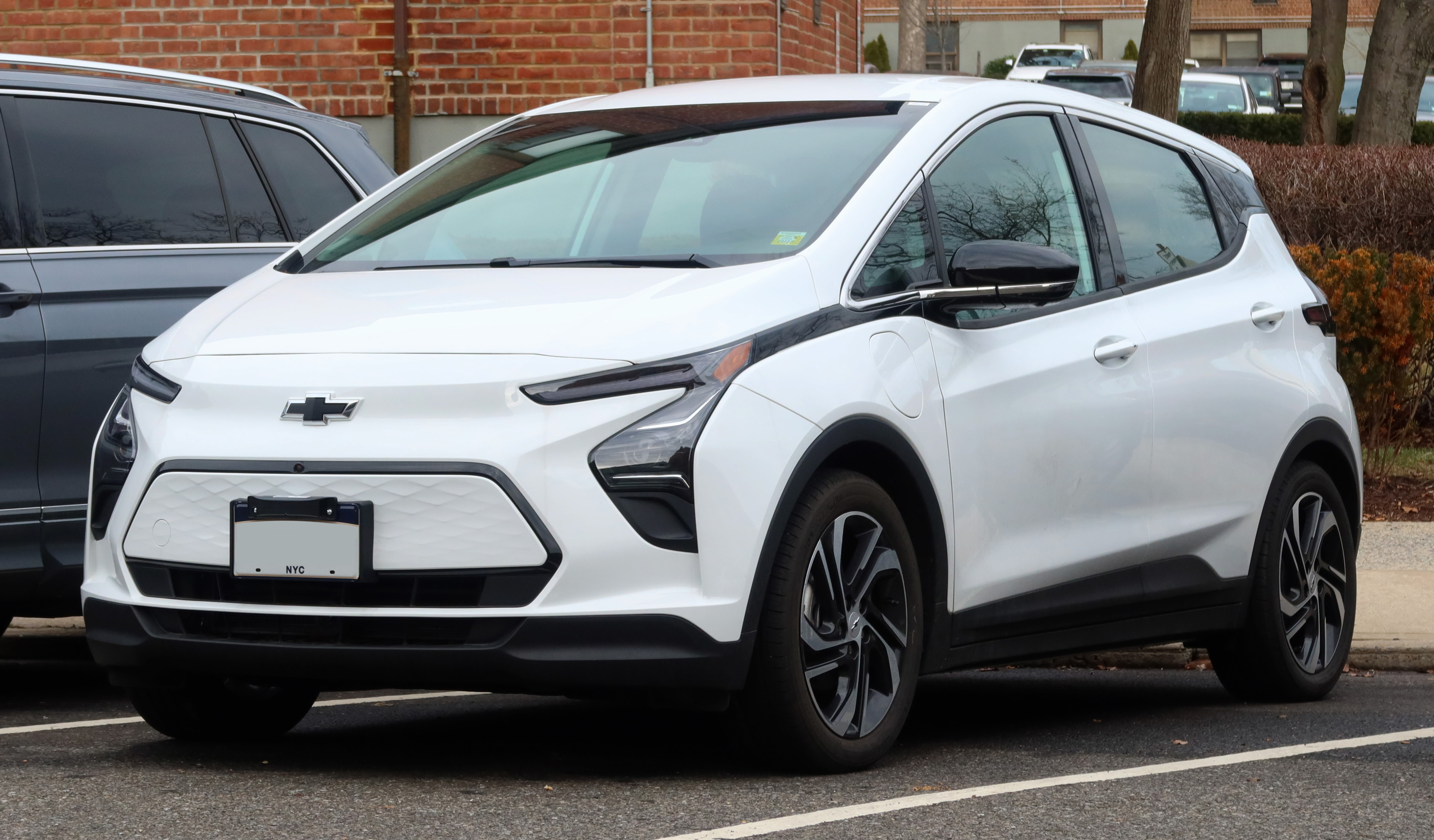
A Chevrolet Bolt EV 2LT, one of many alternative fuel vehicles consumers may get a rebate for in Pennsylvania.

- Pennsylvania has the Alternate Fuel Vehicle (AFV) rebate program for consumers who buy electric vehicles. The rebate is a cash incentive meant to lower the cost of entry into this emerging market.
- In addition to state level rebate programs, there are even more federal rebate programs available for similar energy efficiency upgrades.

== Business and non-residential energy efficiency incentive programs ==
Businesses and other non-residential buildings in Pennsylvania can also receive utility incentives to upgrade less energy efficient equipment. These incentives are offered by:

- PECO Energy Phase IV filing
- First Energy PA ( Met-Ed, Penn Power, West Penn Power and Penelec ) Phase IV filing
- Duquesne Light Phase IV filing
- PPL Electric Utilities Phase IV filing

Summary of non-residential programs and incentives in PA

The equipment covered by these incentives can include: Appliances, Agriculture, Building Envelope, Controls, Variable Frequency Drives, Lighting, HVAC, Fans, Computer, Motors, Compressed Air, Food Service, Plug Load, Refrigeration, Process, Retro-commissioning and Custom.

Incentives are offered through 2 general non-residential program designs in Pennsylvania. Downstream refers to incentive programs where the utilities customer applies for the incentive either before or after the upgrade and fills out an application and submits supporting document and then receives a financial award. Midstream refers to incentive programs where an intermediary, an electrical distributor or contractor, is authorized to offer a simplified incentive at the point of sale, collects a small amount of information about the customer and is reimbursed by the utility for offering the incentive.
