= Thermal efficiency =

Performance measure of a device that uses thermal energy

In thermodynamics, the thermal efficiency ($\eta_{\rm th}$) is a dimensionless performance measure of a device that uses thermal energy, such as an internal combustion engine, steam turbine, steam engine, boiler, furnace, refrigerator, ACs etc.

For a heat engine, thermal efficiency is the ratio of the net work output to the heat input; in the case of a heat pump, thermal efficiency (known as the coefficient of performance or COP) is the ratio of net heat output (for heating), or the net heat removed (for cooling) to the energy input (external work). The efficiency of a heat engine is fractional as the output is always less than the input while the COP of a heat pump is more than 1. These values are further restricted by the Carnot theorem.

== Overview ==
Output (mechanical) energy is always lower than input energy

In general, energy conversion efficiency is the ratio between the useful output of a device and the input, in energy terms. For thermal efficiency, the input, $Q_{\rm in}$, to the device is heat, or the heat-content of a fuel that is consumed. The desired output is mechanical work, $W_{\rm out}$, or heat, $Q_{\rm out}$, or possibly both. Because the input heat normally has a real financial cost, a memorable, generic definition of thermal efficiency is

$$\eta_{\rm  th} \equiv \frac{\text{benefit}}{\text{cost}}.$$

From the first law of thermodynamics, the energy output cannot exceed the input, and by the second law of thermodynamics it cannot be equal in a non-ideal process, so
$$0 \le \eta_{\rm th} < 1$$

When expressed as a percentage, the thermal efficiency must be between 0% and 100%. Efficiency must be less than 100% because there are inefficiencies such as friction and heat loss that convert the energy into alternative forms. For example, a typical gasoline automobile engine operates at around 25% efficiency, and a large coal-fuelled electrical generating plant peaks at about 46%. However, advances in Formula 1 motorsport regulations have pushed teams to develop highly efficient power units which peak around 45–50% thermal efficiency. The largest diesel engine in the world peaks at 51.7%. In a combined cycle plant, thermal efficiencies approach 60%. Such a real-world value may be used as a figure of merit for the device.

For engines where a fuel is burned, there are two types of thermal efficiency: indicated thermal efficiency and brake thermal efficiency. This form of efficiency is only appropriate when comparing similar types or similar devices.

For other systems, the specifics of the calculations of efficiency vary, but the non-dimensional input is still the same:
Efficiency = Output energy / input energy.

== Heat engines ==

Heat engines transform thermal energy, or heat, Q_{in} into mechanical energy, or work, W_{net}. They cannot do this task perfectly, so some of the input heat energy is not converted into work, but is dissipated as waste heat Q_{out} < 0 into the surroundings:

$$Q_{in} = |W_{\rm net}| + |Q_{\rm out}|$$

The thermal efficiency of a heat engine is the percentage of heat energy that is transformed into work. Thermal efficiency is defined as

$$\eta_{\rm th} \equiv \frac{|W_{\rm net}|}{Q_{\rm in}} = \frac{ {Q_{\rm in}} - |Q_{\rm out}|} {Q_{\rm in}} = 1 - \frac{|Q_{\rm out}|}{Q_{\rm in}}$$

The efficiency of even the best heat engines is low; usually below 50% and often far below. So the energy lost to the environment by heat engines is a major waste of energy resources. Since a large fraction of the fuels produced worldwide go to powering heat engines, perhaps up to half of the useful energy produced worldwide is wasted in engine inefficiency, although modern cogeneration, combined cycle and energy recycling schemes are beginning to use this heat for other purposes. This inefficiency can be attributed to three causes. There is an overall theoretical limit to the efficiency of any heat engine due to temperature, called the Carnot efficiency. Second, specific types of engines have lower limits on the ideal efficiency of the engine cycle they use. Thirdly, the nonideal behavior of real engines, such as mechanical friction and losses in the combustion process, causes further efficiency losses.

=== Carnot efficiency ===
The second law of thermodynamics puts a fundamental limit on the thermal efficiency of all heat engines. Even an ideal, frictionless engine can't convert anywhere near 100% of its input heat into work. The limiting factors are the temperature at which the heat enters the engine, $T_{\rm H}\,$, and the temperature of the environment into which the engine exhausts its waste heat, $T_{\rm C}\,$, measured in an absolute scale, such as the Kelvin or Rankine scale. From Carnot's theorem, for any engine working between these two temperatures:

$$\eta_{\rm  th} \le 1 - \frac{T_{\rm C}}{T_{\rm H}}$$

This limiting value is called the Carnot cycle efficiency because it is the efficiency of an unattainable, ideal, reversible engine cycle called the Carnot cycle. No device converting heat into mechanical energy, regardless of its construction, can exceed this efficiency.

Examples of $T_{\rm H}\,$ are the temperature of hot steam entering the turbine of a steam power plant, or the temperature at which the fuel burns in an internal combustion engine. $T_{\rm C}$ is usually the ambient temperature where the engine is located, or the temperature of a lake or river into which the waste heat is discharged. For example, if an automobile engine burns gasoline at a temperature of $T_{\rm H} = 816^\circ \text{C} = 1500^\circ \text{F} = 1089 \text{K}$ and the ambient temperature is $T_{\rm C} = 21^\circ \text{C} = 70^\circ \text{F} = 294 \text{K}$, then its maximum possible efficiency is:

$$\eta_{\rm  th} \le \left (1 -  \frac{294 K}{1089 K} \right ) 100\% = 73.0\%$$

Due to the other causes detailed below, practical engines have efficiencies far below the Carnot limit. For example, the average automobile engine is less than 35% efficient.

Carnot's theorem applies to thermodynamic cycles, where thermal energy is converted to mechanical work. Devices that convert a fuel's chemical energy directly into electrical work, such as fuel cells, can exceed the Carnot efficiency.

=== Engine cycle efficiency ===
The Carnot cycle is reversible and thus represents the upper limit on efficiency of an engine cycle. Practical engine cycles have inherently lower efficiency than the Carnot efficiency when operated between the same temperatures $T_{\rm H}$ and $T_{\rm C}$. One of the factors determining efficiency is how heat is added to the working fluid in the cycle, and how it is removed. The Carnot cycle achieves maximum efficiency because all the heat is added to the working fluid at the maximum temperature $T_{\rm H}$, and removed at the minimum temperature $T_{\rm C}$. In contrast, in an internal combustion engine, the temperature of the fuel-air mixture in the cylinder is nowhere near its peak temperature as the fuel starts to burn, and only reaches the peak temperature as all the fuel is consumed, so the average temperature at which heat is added is lower, reducing efficiency.

An important parameter in the efficiency of combustion engines is the specific heat ratio of the air-fuel mixture, γ. This varies somewhat with the fuel, but is generally close to the air value of 1.4. This standard value is usually used in the engine cycle equations below, and when this approximation is made the cycle is called an air-standard cycle.

- Otto cycle: automobiles The Otto cycle is the name for the cycle used in spark-ignition internal combustion engines such as gasoline and hydrogen fuelled automobile engines. Its theoretical efficiency depends on the compression ratio r of the engine and the specific heat ratio γ of the gas in the combustion chamber.
  $$\eta_{\rm th} = 1 - \frac{1}{r^{\gamma-1}}$$
  Thus, the efficiency increases with the compression ratio. However the compression ratio of Otto cycle engines is limited by the need to prevent the uncontrolled combustion known as knocking. Modern engines have compression ratios in the range 8 to 11, resulting in ideal cycle efficiencies of 56% to 61%.
- Diesel cycle: trucks and trains In the Diesel cycle used in diesel truck and train engines, the fuel is ignited by compression in the cylinder. The efficiency of the Diesel cycle is dependent on r and γ like the Otto cycle, and also by the cutoff ratio, r_{c}, which is the ratio of the cylinder volume at the beginning and end of the combustion process:
  $$\eta_{\rm th} = 1-\frac{r^{1-\gamma}(r_{\rm c}^\gamma - 1)}{\gamma(r_{\rm c} - 1)}$$
  The Diesel cycle is less efficient than the Otto cycle when using the same compression ratio. However, practical Diesel engines are 30% - 35% more efficient than gasoline engines. This is because, since the fuel is not introduced to the combustion chamber until it is required for ignition, the compression ratio is not limited by the need to avoid knocking, so higher ratios are used than in spark ignition engines.
- Rankine cycle: steam power plants The Rankine cycle is the cycle used in steam turbine power plants. The majority of the world's electric power is produced with this cycle. Since the cycle's working fluid, water, changes from liquid to vapor and back during the cycle, their efficiencies depend on the thermodynamic properties of water. The thermal efficiency of modern steam turbine plants with reheat cycles can reach 47%. Combined cycle plants, in which exhaust heat from a gas turbine is supplied to a steam plant, can approach, or even surpass, a thermal efficiency of 60%.
- Brayton cycle: gas turbines and jet engines The Brayton cycle is the cycle used in gas turbines and jet engines. It consists of a compressor that increases pressure of the incoming air, then fuel is continuously added to the flow and burned, and the hot exhaust gasses are expanded in a turbine. The ideal efficiency depends only on the ratio of the pressure inside the combustion chamber p_{2} to the pressure outside p_{1}
  $$\eta_{\rm th} = 1 - \left(\frac{p_2}{p_1}\right)^\frac{1-\gamma}{\gamma}$$

=== Other inefficiencies ===
One should not confuse thermal efficiency with other efficiencies that are used when discussing engines. The above efficiency formulas are based on simple idealized mathematical models of engines, with no friction and working fluids that obey simplified thermodynamic models. Real engines have many departures from ideal behavior that waste energy, reducing actual efficiencies below the theoretical values given above. Examples are:

- friction of moving parts
- inefficient combustion
- heat loss from the combustion chamber
- departure of the working fluid from the thermodynamic properties of an ideal gas
- aerodynamic drag of air moving through the engine
- energy used by auxiliary equipment like oil and water pumps.
- inefficient compressors and turbines
- imperfect valve timing

These factors may be accounted when analyzing thermodynamic cycles, however discussion of how to do so is outside the scope of this article.

== Energy conversion ==
For a device that converts energy from another form into thermal energy (such as an electric heater, boiler, or furnace), the thermal efficiency is

$$\eta_{\rm th} \equiv \frac{|Q_{\rm out}|}{Q_{\rm in}}$$

where the $Q$ quantities are heat-equivalent values.

So, for a boiler that produces 210 kW (or 700,000 BTU/h) output for each 300 kW (or 1,000,000 BTU/h) heat-equivalent input, its thermal efficiency is 210/300 = 0.70, or 70%. This means that 30% of the energy is lost to the environment.

An electric resistance heater has a thermal efficiency close to 100%. When comparing heating units, such as a highly efficient electric resistance heater to an 80% efficient natural gas-fuelled furnace, an economic analysis is needed to determine the most cost-effective choice.

=== Effects of fuel heating value ===
The heating value of a fuel is the amount of heat released during an exothermic reaction (e.g., combustion) and is a characteristic of each substance. It is measured in units of energy per unit of the substance, usually mass, such as: kJ/kg, J/mol.

The heating value for fuels is expressed as the HHV, LHV, or GHV to distinguish treatment of the heat of phase changes:

- Higher heating value (HHV) is determined by bringing all the products of combustion back to the original pre-combustion temperature, and in particular condensing any vapor produced. This is the same as the thermodynamic heat of combustion.
- Lower heating value (LHV) (or net calorific value) is determined by subtracting the heat of vaporization of the water vapor from the higher heating value. The energy required to vaporize the water therefore is not realized as heat.
- Gross heating value accounts for water in the exhaust leaving as vapor, and includes liquid water in the fuel prior to combustion. This value is important for fuels like wood or coal, which will usually contain some amount of water prior to burning.

Which definition of heating value is being used significantly affects any quoted efficiency. Not stating whether an efficiency is HHV or LHV renders such numbers very misleading.

== Heat pumps and refrigerators ==
Heat pumps, refrigerators and air conditioners use work to move heat from a colder to a warmer place, so their function is the opposite of a heat engine. The work energy (W_{in}) that is applied to them is converted into heat, and the sum of this energy and the heat energy that is taken up from the cold reservoir (Q_{C}) is equal to the magnitude of the total heat energy given off to the hot reservoir (|Q_{H}|)

$$|Q_{\rm H}| = Q_{\rm C} + W_{\rm in}$$

Their efficiency is measured by a coefficient of performance (COP). Heat pumps are measured by the efficiency with which they give off heat to the hot reservoir, COP_{heating}; refrigerators and air conditioners by the efficiency with which they take up heat from the cold space, COP_{cooling}:

$$\mathrm{COP}_{\mathrm{heating}} \equiv \frac{|Q_{\rm H}|}{W_{\rm in}} = \frac{Q_{\rm C} + W_{\rm in}}{W_{\rm in}} = \mathrm{COP}_{\mathrm{cooling}}+1\,$$

$$\mathrm{COP}_{\mathrm{cooling}} \equiv \frac{Q_{\rm C}}{W_{\rm in}}\,$$

The reason the term "coefficient of performance" is used instead of "efficiency" is that, since these devices are moving heat, not creating it, the amount of heat they move can be greater than the input work, so the COP can be greater than 1 (100%). Therefore, heat pumps can be a more efficient way of heating than simply converting the input work into heat, as in an electric heater or furnace.

Since they are heat engines, these devices are also limited by Carnot's theorem. The limiting value of the Carnot 'efficiency' for these processes, with the equality theoretically achievable only with an ideal 'reversible' cycle, is:

$$\mathrm{COP}_{\mathrm{heating}} \le \frac{T_{\rm H}}{T_{\rm H} - T_{\rm C}}=\mathrm{COP}_\mathrm{heating,Carnot}$$

$$\mathrm{COP}_{\mathrm{cooling}} \le \frac{T_{\rm C}}{T_{\rm H} - T_{\rm C}}=\mathrm{COP}_\mathrm{cooling,Carnot}$$

The same device used between the same temperatures is more efficient when considered as a heat pump than when considered as a refrigerator since

$$\mathrm{COP}_{\mathrm{heating}} = \mathrm{COP}_{\mathrm{cooling}} + 1$$

This is because when heating, the work used to run the device is converted to heat and adds to the desired effect, whereas if the desired effect is cooling the heat resulting from the input work is just an unwanted by-product. Sometimes, the term efficiency is used for the ratio of the achieved COP to the Carnot COP, which can not exceed 100%.

== Energy efficiency ==
The 'thermal efficiency' is sometimes called the energy efficiency. In the United States, in everyday usage the SEER is the more common measure of energy efficiency for cooling devices, as well as for heat pumps when in their heating mode. For energy-conversion heating devices their peak steady-state thermal efficiency is often stated, e.g., 'this furnace is 90% efficient', but a more detailed measure of seasonal energy effectiveness is the annual fuel use efficiency (AFUE).

=== Heat exchangers ===
The role of a heat exchanger is to transfer heat between two mediums, so the performance of the heat exchanger is closely related to energy or thermal efficiency. A counter flow heat exchanger is the most efficient type of heat exchanger in transferring heat energy from one circuit to the other. However, for a more complete picture of heat exchanger efficiency, exergetic considerations must be taken into account. Thermal efficiencies of an internal combustion engine are typically higher than that of external combustion engines.

== See also ==
- Kalina cycle
- Electrical efficiency
- Mechanical efficiency
- Heat engine
- Federal roofing tax credit for energy efficiency (US)
- Lower heating value
- Cost of electricity by source
- Higher heating value
- Energy conversion efficiency
