= Steenderen =

- Village
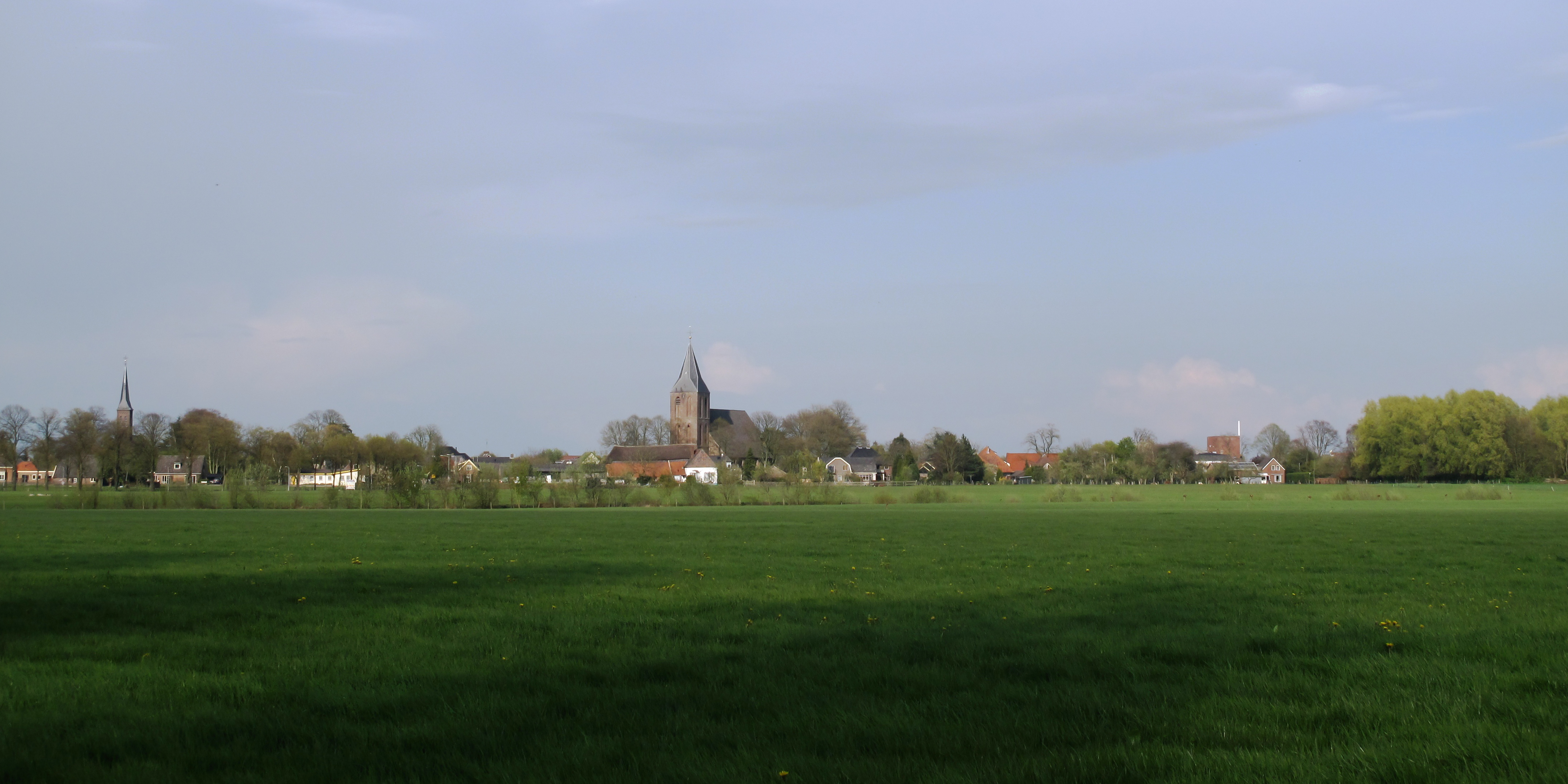
- Steenderen, view to the village with two church towers

- Flag Coat of arms

- Location in the province of Gelderland Steenderen (Netherlands)
- Coordinates: 52°3′52″N 6°11′12″E
- Country: Netherlands
- Province: Gelderland
- Municipality: Bronckhorst

Area
  - Total: 50.21 km^{2} (19.39 sq mi)
- Elevation: 10 m (33 ft)

Population (2021)
  - Total: 4,655
  - Density: 92.71/km^{2} (240.1/sq mi)
- Time zone: UTC+1 (CET)
  - Summer (DST): UTC+2 (CEST)
- Postal code: 7221-7229
- Dialing code: 0575

Steenderen is a former municipality and a village in the eastern Netherlands. It has been part of the new municipality of Bronckhorst since 2005.

== History ==
It was first mentioned in 1046 as Stenere, and means "stone buildings on a sandy ridge". In 1217, a parish church is established. The Dutch Reformed Church has elements dating from the 14th century. In 1782, it suffered a fire after a lightning strike, and was rebuilt. The church was restored between 1966 and 1972. In 1840, it was home to 486 people.

The grist mill Bronkhorstermolen dates from 1844 and was restored in 1960. The potato and chips factory Aviko was founded in Steenderen in 1962. In 2019, a 35 metres (115 ft) refrigerator tower was constructed, giving Steenderen three towers.

== Former population centres ==
- Baak
- Bronkhorst
- Olburgen
- Rha
- Steenderen
- Toldijk

== Gallery ==
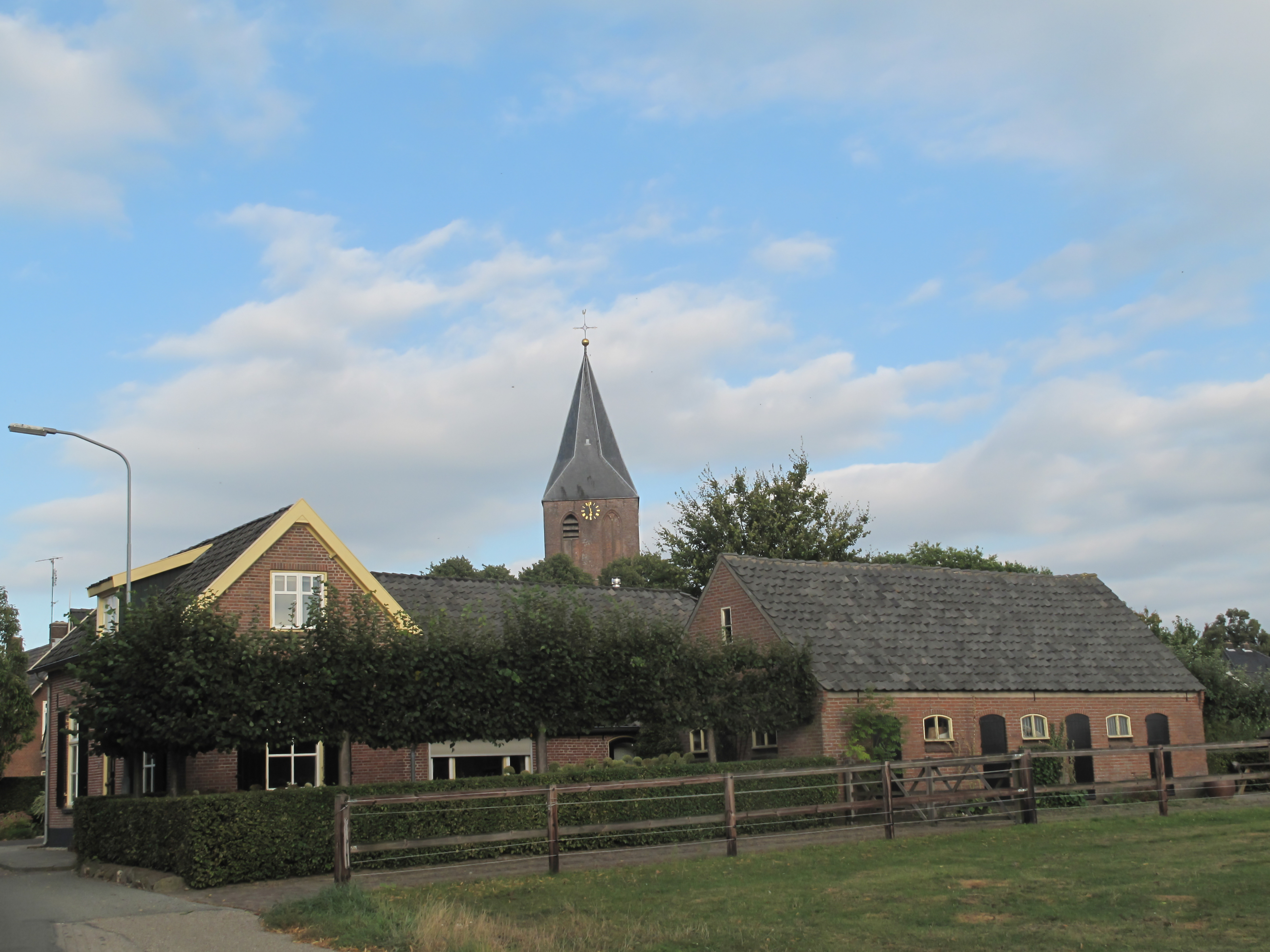
Steenderen, church (de Sint Remigiuskerk) in the street

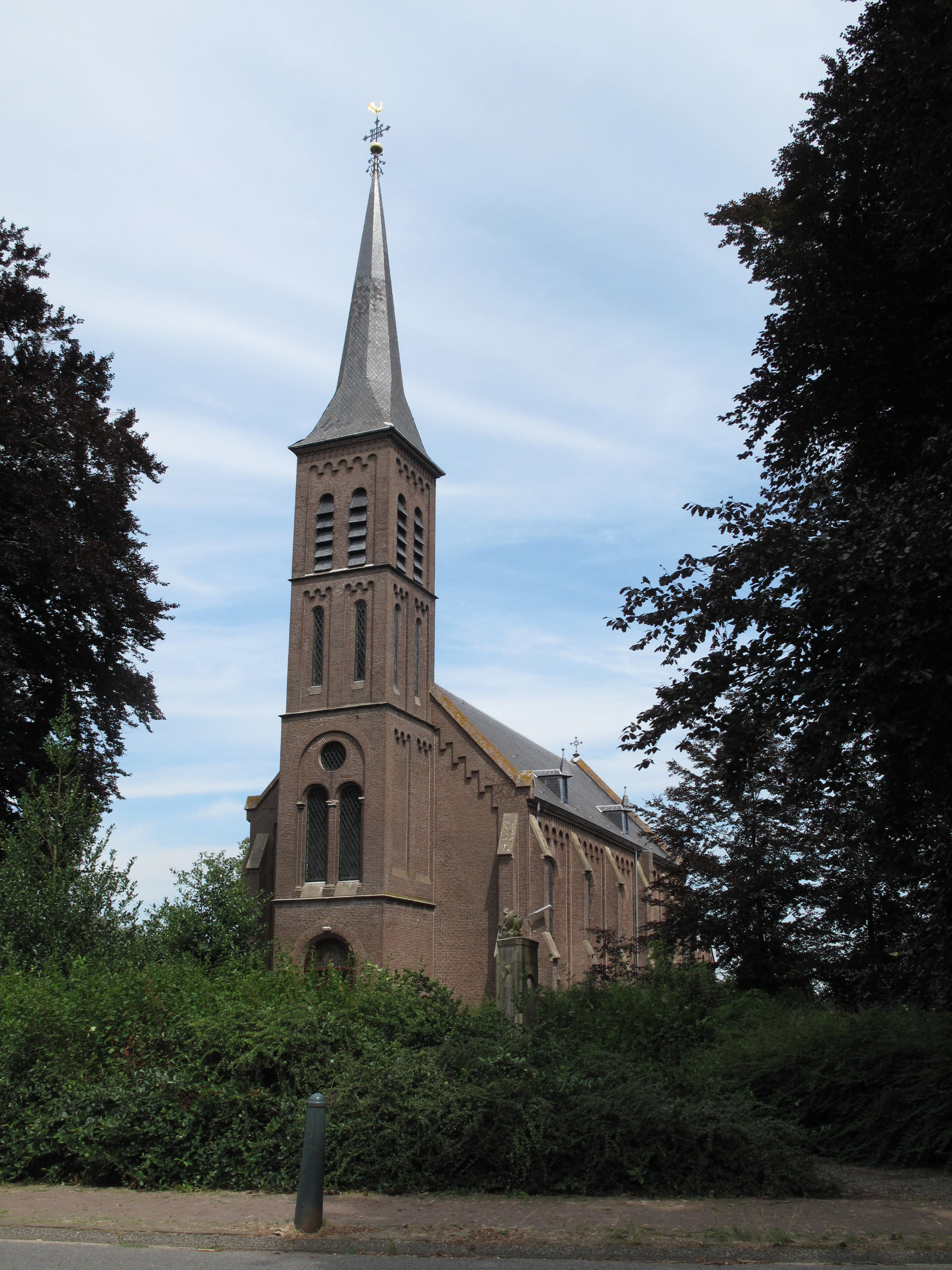
Steenderen, church: de Sint Willibrorduskerk

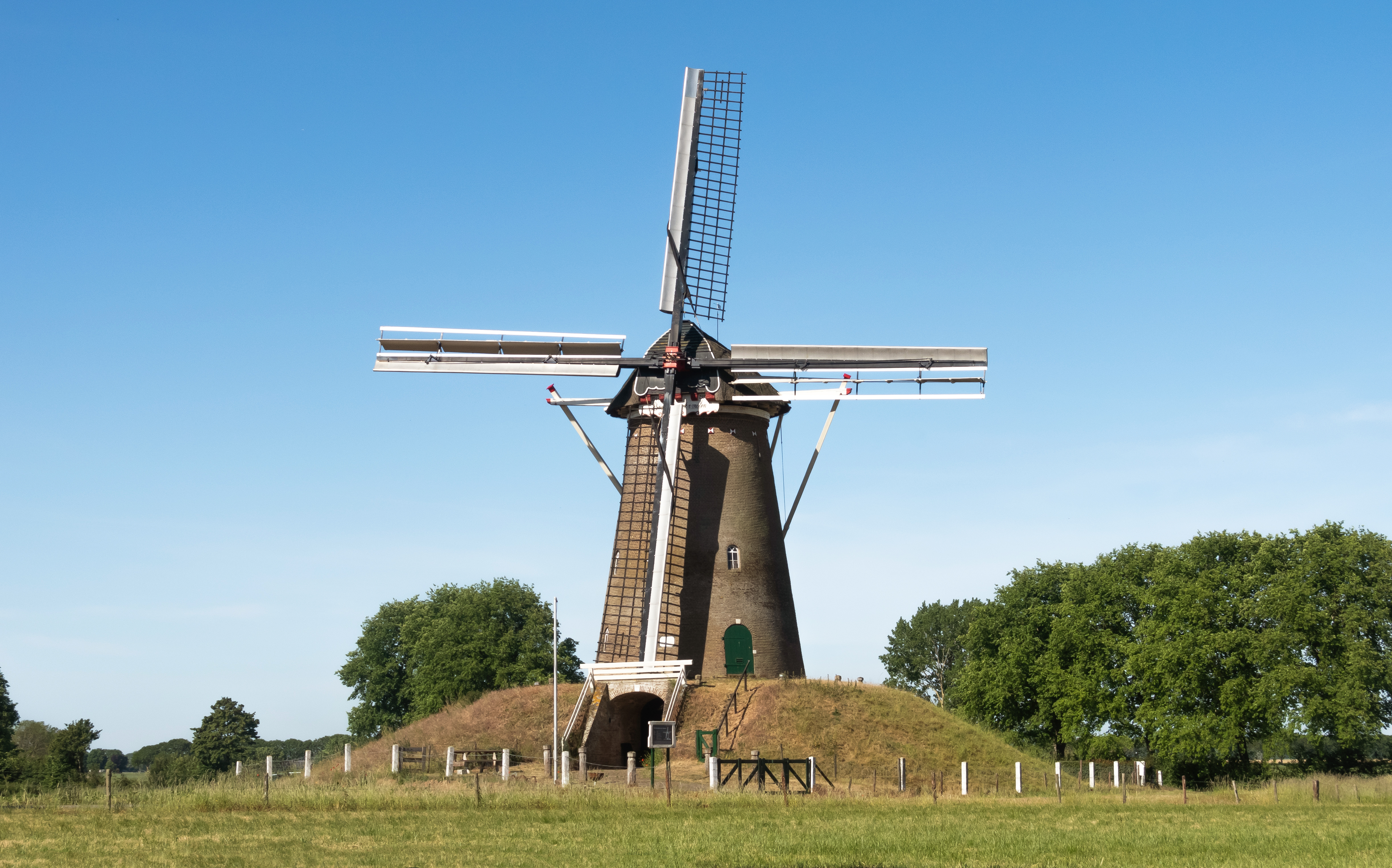
between Steenderen and Bronkhorst, Bronkhorstermolen
