= Aviko =

Dutch food company

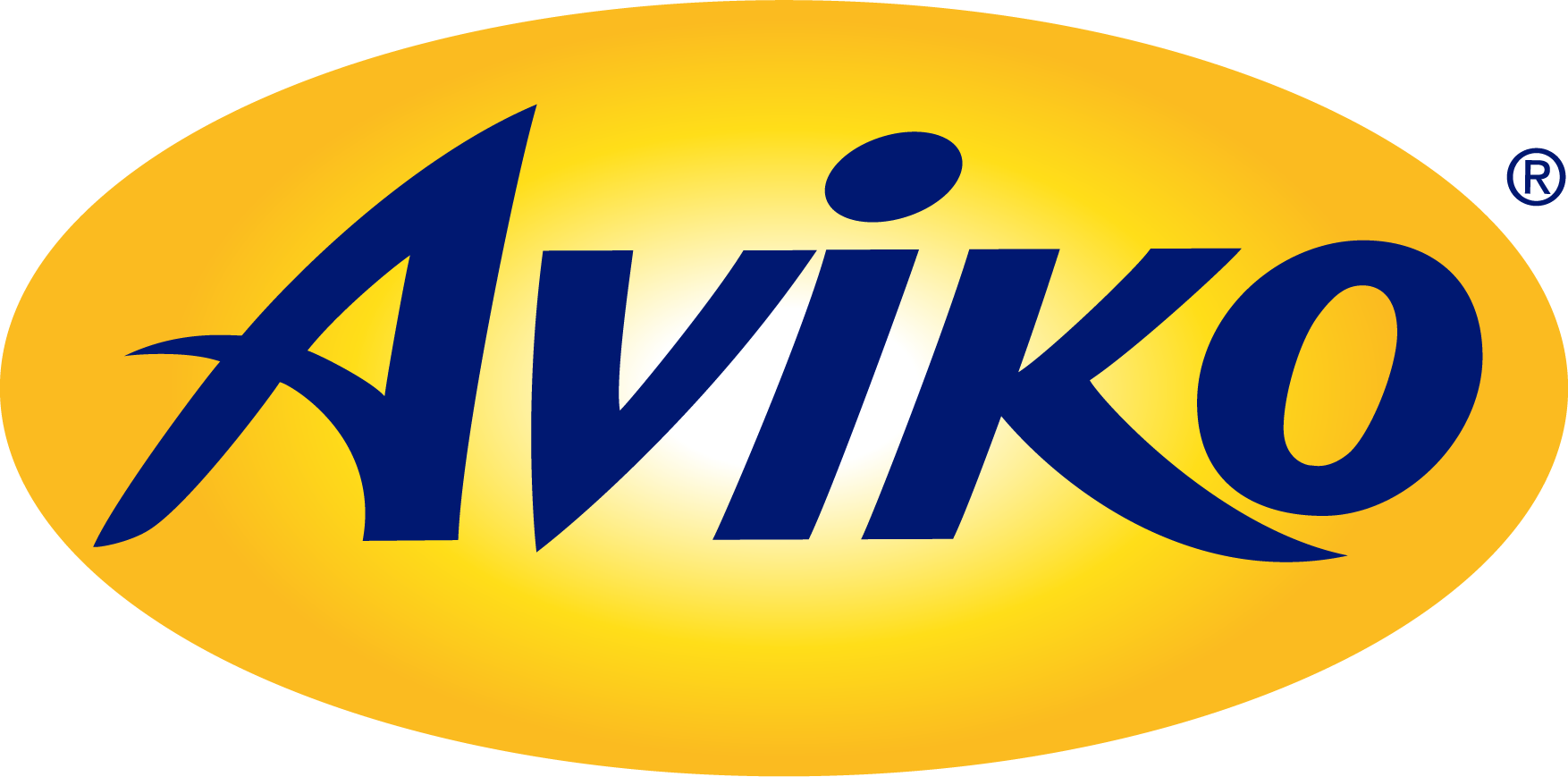

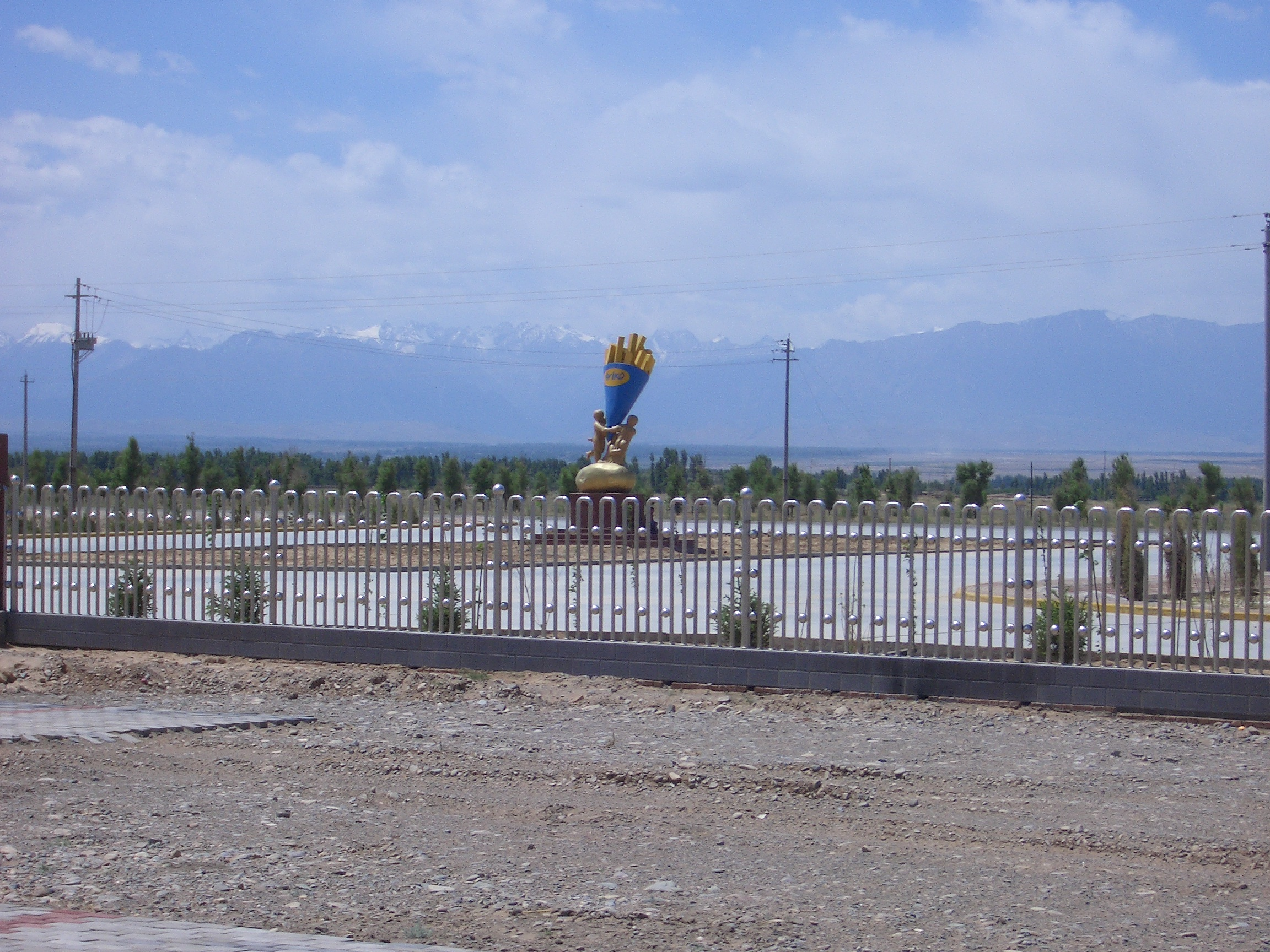
- Aviko symbol on a factory site in China
- Type: B.V.
- Industry: Food industry
- Founded: 1962; 64 years ago
- Founders: Arie de Rooij
- Headquarters: Steenderen, Netherlands
- Area served: Worldwide
- Key people: Piet Hein Merckens (CEO)
- Products: Potato products
- Revenue: € 757 million (2015)
- Net income: € 18 million (2015)
- Number of employees: 2055 (2015)
- Website: https://corporate.aviko.com/en

Aviko is a Dutch food company headquartered in the village of Steenderen, which is part of the municipality of Bronckhorst in the province of Gelderland. Potatoes are primarily processed into French fries, hash browns, potato ready meals and potato flakes. The name "Aviko" is an acronym from "Aardappel verwerkende industrie Keppel en omstreken" (Potato processing industry in Keppel and the surrounding area). Currently, the company is one of the four largest potato processors in the world, and its share in the production of chilled French fries is 50% worldwide.

== History ==
Aviko was founded in Hoog-Keppel in 1962. In 1970 the headquarters were moved to Steenderen. Aviko has been wholly owned by the Royal Cosun Group since 2002. Royal Cosun, then known as Suiker Unie, had held a 30% stake in the capital since 1990. The Royal Cosun Group is a cooperative owned primarily by farmers. Aviko B.V. has 12 subsidiaries and had a turnover of £279 million in 1999. On December 1, 2010, Aviko took over the French fry potato business from Agrico.

In Germany, Aviko has a subsidiary in Rain (Aviko Deutschland GmbH), in nearby Oberdolling Aviko B.V. has a subsidiary. In 2014, the Amberger family took over a majority stake in the Dolli factory (brands Dolli, Feldmühle, Helmer; sales 35 million euros, 220 employees). At the beginning of 2017, Dolli-Werk was completely taken over by Aviko. Until operations ceased on December 31, 2018, the plant was managed by Bert-Jan Loman as general manager. In Poland, Aviko has a stake in a potato processing factory in Lębork and in the People's Republic of China, Aviko has a majority stake in China's largest potato processing factory in Minle County, Gansu Province.

Aviko processes well over 1 million tons of potatoes every year. Aviko's value market share in frozen potato products in the Netherlands was 48% in 2006.

In September 2020, a strategic partnership with the food company Unilever was announced. In this context, the company takes over the production plant in Stavenhagen, Germany.

== Subsidiaries ==
- Rixona. B.V.: potato granules
- Aviko Precooked Potato Products in Cuijk, Netherlands (EPC B.V.): Fresh potato products
- De Fritesspecialist B.V. in Lomm, Netherlands
- Aviko Deutschland GmbH in Rain
- Duynie B.V. in Alphen a/d Rijn: Use of the potato peels resulting from potato processing as livestock feed
- Algen AB (Sweden): Pre-cooked potato products
- Aviko Potato B.V., Dronten (NL): Purchasing, logistics and quality monitoring for the Aviko Group factories
- Aviko USA L.L.C., Jamestown (USA)
- Aviko Sp. z o.o, Gdynia (Poland)
- Aviko (UK) Limited
- Aviko (Gansu) Potato Processing Co. Ltd., Minle (PR China)

== Notes and references ==
=== Note ===
This article is based (mostly) on Aviko article from the German Wikipedia.
