= Federal roofing tax credit for energy efficiency =

Energy Star Certified Logo

== Tax Credit Goals ==
The 2009 Federal Roofing Tax Credit is part of a twofold plan rolled out by the US federal government. The first goal was intended to stimulate the economy by motivating Americans to replace their roofs with more energy efficient roofs, thereby creating jobs by increasing the demand for labor in the roofing, manufacturing, and construction industries. The other goal of the 2009 federal roofing tax credit was to reduce carbon emissions to the environment by requiring consumers to install Energy Star products on their homes in order to receive the tax credit; the installation of energy star roofing products in homes would reduce the consumption of electricity needed to maintain the desired temperature within the residence.

== Tax Credit Coverage ==
To qualify for the tax credit, the new roofing materials were required to be metal with an appropriate pigmented coating or asphalt with cooling granules compliant with energy star requirements. The Environmental Protection Agency provided a list of some products which satisfy the tax credit's requirement, but consumers should also check with the manufacturer prior to purchase to ensure the materials qualify.

The government has placed a restriction on the tax credit dictating that the new roof must be installed at the principal residence of the tax payer between January 1, 2009, and December 31, 2010. Principal residence is defined as a home owned by the party filing for the credit and used as his principal place of residence. Principal residences can include houses, houseboats, mobile homes, cooperative apartments, condominiums, or manufactured homes.

== Tax Credit Amount ==
The federal roofing tax credit for energy efficiency is dependent on the cost of the materials used in the renovation. A consumer could only receive a tax credit of up to 30% of the material cost, up to a maximum of $1,500. This credit is for funds spent on the energy-star approved materials, not on installation or labor cost. For example, if the roofing materials cost $5,000 and the labor expense was $5,000, resulting in a total cost of $10,000, a tax filer would still only receive the maximum tax credit of $1,500.

== Energy Star ==
It is an advisable idea to utilize materials that will reduce the heat of a homeowner's residence to reduce their energy consumption and their impact on the environment. However, not all consumers will derive the same benefit from the use of a reflective heat-reducing roofs in reducing energy consumption.

Reflective heat reduction roofing or a cool roof is most beneficial in hot sunny climates. If a home's roof is partially or completely shaded, the homeowner may not benefit as much as someone with in direct sunlight. However even if a homeowner's roof is shaded, they will still receive the tax credit, receive benefit of heat reduction roofing, and enjoy a high-quality environmentally friendly roof.

== See also ==
Cool roof
Green roof
