= Domestic energy consumption =

Total energy consumption of single household

Domestic energy consumption refers to the total energy consumption of a single household. Globally, the amount of energy used per household may vary significantly, depending on factors such as the standard of living of the country, the climate, the age of the occupant of the home, and type of residence. Households in different parts of the world will have differing levels of consumption, based on latitude and technology. See here for a view of relative power consumption of different household appliances.

== United States ==
According to the US EIA as of 2022, the average annual amount of electricity sold to a U.S. residential electric-utility customer was 10,791 kilowatt-hours (kWh), or an average of about 899 kWh per month. The US state of Louisiana had the highest annual electricity purchases per residential customer at 14,774 kWh and the US state of Hawaii had the lowest at 6,178 kWh per residential customer.

As of 2008, in an average household in a temperate climate, the yearly use of household energy is comprised as follows:

Average domestic energy consumption per household in the United States
Heating	12000 kWh/yr (1400 watts)
Hot water	3000 kWh/yr (340 watts)
Cooling and refrigeration	1200 kWh/yr (140 watts)
Lighting	1200 kWh/yr (140 watts)
Washing and drying	1000 kWh/yr (110 watts)
Cooking	1000 kWh/yr (110 watts)
Miscellaneous electric load	600 kWh/yr (70 watts)

== European Union ==
According to eurostat as of 2021, households represented 27% of final energy consumption in the EU. The main use of energy by households was for heating their homes (64.4% of final energy consumption in the residential sector), with renewables accounting for more than a quarter (27%) of EU households space heating consumption.

== See also ==
- 2000-watt society
- Zero-energy building
