= Consortium for Energy Efficiency =

US nonprofit organization

- Abbreviation: CEE
- Headquarters: Boston, Massachusetts
- Region served: United States & Canada
- Members: 132 organizations (2016)
- Revenue: US$3,930,142 (2013)
- Website: cee1.org

The Consortium for Energy Efficiency (CEE) is a nonprofit 501(c)(3) organization that promotes the adoption of energy efficient products and services. CEE specifications are referenced by the United States Department of Energy and by the efficiency programs of many natural gas and electric utilities in the United States and Canada. The organization's Annual Industry Report documents the efficiency industry's US$8 billion in annual expenditures.

== Activities and funding ==
CEE influences the market for efficient products and services through 17 initiatives covering the residential, commercial and industrial sectors; Product examples include space heating, refrigeration lighting, and industrial water treatment. These initiatives are voluntarily adopted by CEE members—such as utility efficiency programs—to establish common levels for high efficiency equipment. Member organizations implement initiatives through rebates, technical assistance, or other efforts in their service territories, states, or provinces. CEE also publishes Qualified Product Lists of equipment meeting high levels of efficiency performance. Some equipment criteria are specifically cited by US law for energy-related federal tax credits.

Since 2000, CEE has conducted the Household ENERGY STAR Survey, identifying the ENERGY STAR program as one of the most recognized brands among US consumers.

According to the organization's 2013 IRS Form 990, membership dues represented US$2,533,118 (64%) of annual revenue. CEE received significant additional funding through its partnerships with the US Environmental Protection Agency, the US Department of Energy, and Natural Resources Canada. Founded in 1991, CEE members consist of more than 100 natural gas and electric utilities, 10 efficiency organizations and state agencies, and 4 DOE national laboratories.

== Annual Industry Report ==
The CEE Annual Industry Report provides funding information and program activities for natural gas and electric demand side management. The 2014 study identified US$7.6 billion in investment in the US and Canada, and detailed expenditures by customer class and state. The report indicated an increase in program budgets from US$4.4 billion in 2008 to US$7.3 billion in 2013.
