= List of countries by potato production =

Potato production

This is a list of countries by potato production from 2016 to 2022, based on data from the Food and Agriculture Organization Corporate Statistical Database. The estimated total world production for potatoes in 2022 was 374,777,763 tonnes, up 0.3% from 373,787,150 tonnes in 2021. China was the largest producer, accounting for 25.5% of world production, followed by India at 15.0%. Dependent territories are shown in italics.

== Production by country ==
Country	2022	2021	2020	2019	2018	2017	2016
China	95,570,055	94,300,000	92,800,000	89,500,000	90,259,155	88,481,500	84,928,500
India	56,176,000	54,230,000	48,562,000	50,190,000	51,310,000	48,605,000	43,417,000
Ukraine	20,899,210	21,356,320	20,837,990	20,269,190	22,503,970	22,208,220	21,750,290
Russia	18,887,679	18,295,535	19,607,361	22,074,874	22,394,960	21,707,645	22,463,487
United States	17,791,840	18,589,530	19,051,790	19,251,320	20,421,560	20,453,430	20,426,359
Germany	10,683,400	11,312,100	11,715,100	10,602,200	8,920,800	11,720,000	10,722,100
Bangladesh	10,144,835	9,887,242	9,606,000	9,655,082	9,744,412	10,215,957	9,474,099
France	8,067,380	8,987,220	8,822,180	8,560,410	7,860,380	8,547,354	6,954,983
Pakistan	7,936,884	5,872,960	4,552,656	4,869,312	4,591,776	3,852,897	3,977,595
Netherlands	6,915,900	6,675,590	7,020,060	6,961,230	6,025,370	7,391,881	6,534,338
Canada	6,248,376	6,372,183	5,286,792	5,364,169	5,204,548	5,419,238	5,345,626
Egypt	6,155,467	6,273,931	6,786,340	5,200,563	4,960,062	4,841,040	4,113,441
Poland	6,030,930	7,081,460	7,859,510	6,481,620	7,311,960	9,171,733	8,872,445
Peru	6,021,030	5,702,350	5,515,378	5,389,231	5,133,927	4,776,294	5,389,231
Turkey	5,200,000	5,100,000	5,200,000	4,979,824	4,550,000	4,800,000	4,750,000
United Kingdom	4,797,301	5,127,387	5,512,813	5,307,000	5,060,000	6,218,000	5,395,000
Algeria	4,299,817	4,360,880	4,659,482	5,020,249	4,653,322	4,606,402	4,759,677
Kazakhstan	4,080,473	4,031,582	4,006,780	3,912,103	3,806,992	3,551,114	3,545,695
Brazil	3,889,797	3,853,464	3,752,999	3,711,744	3,728,953	3,655,069	3,851,396
Belarus	3,857,256	3,405,055	3,707,899	4,354,700	4,347,600	5,009,400	4,896,600
Belgium	3,577,730	3,871,470	3,928,910	4,027,620	3,045,440	4,416,665	3,402,787
Uzbekistan	3,443,224	3,285,646	3,143,818	3,089,658	2,911,933	2,793,689	2,789,476
Nepal	3,410,829	3,325,231	3,131,830	3,112,947	3,088,000	2,691,037	2,805,582
Denmark	2,617,600	2,374,600	2,762,900	2,408,700	1,806,800	2,171,000	1,954,016
Iran	2,600,000	2,599,089	3,214,971	3,452,328	3,574,934	4,117,462	4,995,327
South Africa	2,528,946	2,595,280	2,669,147	2,673,768	2,467,724	2,456,990	2,150,811
Colombia	2,526,330	2,596,518	2,625,272	3,123,804	3,018,999	3,706,563	3,034,031
Argentina	2,223,409	2,949,947	2,884,000	2,600,000	2,483,769	2,459,310	2,430,866
Japan	2,106,363	2,175,000	2,205,000	2,399,000	2,260,000	2,395,000	2,199,000
Spain	1,881,920	2,081,110	2,051,830	2,259,320	2,010,930	2,239,470	2,246,204
Mexico	1,870,129	1,947,761	1,943,910	1,783,896	1,802,592	1,715,499	1,796,814
Morocco	1,768,362	1,641,853	1,707,068	1,956,711	1,869,149	1,924,871	1,743,617
Kenya	1,745,000	2,107,824	1,859,776	1,978,952	1,870,375	1,519,870	1,335,883
Indonesia	1,503,998	1,361,064	1,282,768	1,314,654	1,284,760	1,164,743	1,213,041
Malawi	1,465,202	1,419,527	1,318,236	1,113,077	1,125,874	1,226,603	1,043,338
Romania	1,345,780	1,397,840	1,601,240	2,626,790	3,022,760	3,116,912	2,689,733
Italy	1,332,980	1,362,130	1,434,650	1,338,430	1,307,600	1,346,936	1,368,920
Ethiopia	1,294,304	1,309,600	1,141,872	924,528	933,109	968,970	921,403
Kyrgyzstan	1,257,012	1,289,108	1,327,163	1,373,800	1,446,610	1,416,011	1,388,369
Bolivia	1,243,913	1,272,649	1,317,923	1,256,584	1,160,940	1,045,291	1,073,744
Nigeria	1,216,409	1,216,885	1,221,406	1,210,936	1,218,313	1,234,968	1,179,526
Australia	1,108,930	1,267,639	1,076,780	1,225,274	1,188,655	1,105,194	1,130,175
Azerbaijan	1,074,261	1,061,958	1,037,637	1,004,172	898,914	913,899	902,396
Chile	1,024,511	994,508	1,288,154	1,162,568	1,183,357	1,426,479	1,166,025
Tanzania	1,013,154	1,070,070	1,095,855	1,013,408	1,080,144	583,082	1,081,454
Rwanda	908,007	938,281	858,521	973,408	916,062	846,184	751,284
Tajikistan	903,117	903,000	916,000	994,433	964,644	782,892	898,116
Afghanistan	889,000	879,371	855,395	921,122	615,684	513,194	427,917
Sweden	852,200	826,000	877,200	846,900	723,000	852,500	862,500
Turkmenistan	698,749	535,908	490,606	382,382	359,747	354,743	351,971
Austria	686,220	769,690	885,890	751,260	697,930	653,400	767,261
Lebanon	676,470	659,480	628,410	572,110	645,900	651,922	631,973
Czech Republic	655,260	671,860	696,220	622,600	583,560	688,970	699,605
Saudi Arabia	605,000	578,108	562,310	474,065	482,350	476,418	466,402
South Korea	586,826	554,893	553,194	630,140	548,065	466,755	555,670
Guatemala	585,481	585,358	598,685	585,358	560,655	551,122	538,532
Finland	561,700	558,790	624,400	618,900	600,300	611,900	587,600
Syria	554,740	594,625	647,319	635,519	562,342	562,416	507,384
North Korea	535,093	645,998	661,092	684,587	570,807	425,047	587,642
Serbia	523,762	613,785	664,891	702,086	487,909	589,241	714,350
Sudan	520,102	504,267	493,882	465,927	439,554	418,622	415,300
Malaysia	520,000	55,000	-	-	-	-	-
Angola	502,204	485,371	480,560	455,249	458,217	461,186	670,456
Israel	487,753	522,925	527,965	524,394	511,163	522,424	597,677
Venezuela	476,796	473,517	451,334	427,319	379,472	421,006	452,673
Guinea	457,632	349,747	266,866	200,576	151,326	131,588	114,424
New Zealand	428,451	552,007	549,617	522,253	496,650	472,183	472,345
Myanmar	426,129	441,807	468,098	485,823	488,535	499,949	554,309
Tunisia	400,000	450,000	450,000	435,000	465,000	420,000	440,000
Greece	391,940	381,740	450,640	470,210	465,770	499,506	491,973
Switzerland	390,000	342,752	488,638	413,984	447,600	461,188	372,900
Norway	376,400	368,900	361,200	332,200	326,400	315,500	350,800
Cameroon	371,642	319,853	321,755	336,378	377,912	369,493	359,798
Ireland	367,950	407,500	300,150	382,370	273,010	412,425	352,000
Burundi	354,554	350,000	350,000	376,441	302,665	204,891	145,687
Armenia	351,339	364,557	437,226	404,057	415,050	547,420	606,314
Yemen	336,739	347,377	242,575	233,051	229,777	240,446	242,195
Vietnam	332,851	323,685	294,090	333,729	376,377	303,675	302,229
Libya	321,044	328,887	366,750	359,460	357,590	319,112	337,465
Portugal	319,830	413,320	409,640	424,290	431,690	515,030	451,041
Bosnia and Herzegovina	312,923	339,727	441,218	381,308	394,274	337,137	417,976
Niger	296,719	339,524	235,635	198,392	168,569	165,743	161,181
Mali	285,310	218,062	225,880	303,257	310,902	251,558	210,209
Iraq	270,591	466,127	674,840	392,348	165,589	266,794	190,702
Albania	262,673	258,862	254,886	260,661	254,543	249,804	238,345
Madagascar	252,408	250,155	247,021	250,000	257,379	250,160	244,412
Ecuador	251,433	244,749	408,313	275,346	269,201	377,243	422,589
Uganda	244,071	241,230	250,000	260,000	327,332	299,338	171,271
Lithuania	226,420	200,160	296,740	329,780	289,800	237,045	351,484
Mongolia	214,005	182,638	244,262	192,240	168,883	121,808	165,330
Hungary	199,210	239,840	270,090	343,540	327,580	402,853	429,435
Georgia	198,900	234,700	208,600	194,700	237,500	180,100	249,000
North Macedonia	196,886	179,815	193,426	190,527	181,931	178,951	198,529
Jordan	196,602	189,372	147,913	173,653	153,199	155,639	273,906
Bulgaria	172,210	195,640	192,330	197,410	261,690	227,815	127,182
Moldova	171,800	218,300	171,899	176,850	174,774	197,020	213,975
Senegal	140,500	143,640	147,985	140,000	118,783	67,485	67,485
Slovakia	130,630	151,100	166,200	182,420	169,950	149,705	177,145
Latvia	130,400	115,100	181,100	223,700	196,200	408,300	491,600
Lesotho	129,488	129,957	129,643	128,864	131,364	128,703	126,525
Thailand	110,860	119,897	126,864	127,935	108,291	107,103	119,778
Philippines	107,416	103,058	113,562	116,061	117,423	117,637	116,783
Democratic Republic of the Congo	106,743	105,457	104,157	102,932	101,694	100,468	100,136
Croatia	103,400	127,830	174,280	173,150	182,260	156,089	193,962
Cuba	92,942	97,292	115,385	129,500	135,147	147,044	95,663
Dominican Republic	92,425	90,802	89,125	94,056	88,557	84,162	84,127
Cyprus	90,000	98,980	91,880	82,100	105,330	109,923	122,803
Costa Rica	77,784	42,334	47,619	52,824	48,748	89,620	97,979
Mozambique	72,890	57,684	65,418	65,473	65,531	65,592	65,656
Estonia	72,620	66,270	88,390	80,130	58,030	91,182	89,842
Palestine	66,040	69,689	60,080	59,640	61,730	63,333	42,000
Taiwan	61,340	62,175	52,722	62,447	62,287	54,929	58,023
Slovenia	58,230	64,040	89,880	65,960	72,920	77,076	84,897
Nicaragua	56,416	77,710	68,817	66,858	66,169	59,699	39,919
Zambia	52,372	62,358	79,980	38,786	13,546	31,750	24,428
Sri Lanka	47,614	75,911	65,085	101,642	88,897	73,358	80,458
Uruguay	46,500	93,121	73,706	94,400	87,000	94,327	89,000
Chad	36,496	36,315	36,506	36,668	35,771	37,081	37,152
Kuwait	35,159	28,996	18,681	34,807	36,212	51,771	14,986
Haiti	35,040	35,032	34,807	35,280	35,010	34,131	36,700
Bhutan	31,146	38,573	45,500	43,560	44,278	57,223	58,820
Burkina Faso	28,855	27,376	35,274	37,000	29,000	32,000	13,000
Panama	27,001	27,256	32,310	23,302	24,424	21,039	31,180
Honduras	26,804	26,748	26,790	26,875	26,578	26,053	25,500
Montenegro	24,579	27,547	29,460	26,557	26,098	27,500	29,917
Jamaica	18,669	16,751	14,685	15,717	16,184	17,148	17,007
Luxembourg	14,610	16,220	16,370	15,330	16,210	21,284	18,714
Mauritius	14,495	12,910	14,192	14,822	17,033	14,124	16,326
Namibia	14,284	14,341	14,328	14,183	14,513	14,287	13,748
Oman	12,861	12,462	16,146	15,766	15,613	15,737	13,116
Zimbabwe	12,494	12,261	14,523	17,913	15,410	15,888	15,620
Eswatini	8,468	8,461	8,438	8,504	8,441	8,369	8,248
El Salvador	7,857	9,169	10,340	8,468	10,597	10,595	13,304
Iceland	7,200	6,355	7,379	8,200	6,020	9,000	9,930
Malta	7,120	7,120	7,990	8,990	9,360	8,740	6,825
Republic of the Congo	6,985	6,993	7,025	6,938	7,016	7,121	6,677
Paraguay	4,167	4,089	3,983	3,867	3,851	5,760	3,625
Cape Verde	4,031	2,400	2,550	2,666	2,200	4,041	2,000
Laos	3,957	4,007	3,770	2,200	2,160	1,585	34,320
Comoros	3,498	3,378	3,253	3,128	3,003	2,878	2,753
Botswana	3,394	2,307	2,461	1,800	12,335	8,765	
Mauritania	2,233	2,229	2,226	2,226	2,374	2,353	2,333
United Arab Emirates	1,920	1,853	1,051	4,193	451	359	4,862
Faroe Islands	1,539	1,534	1,529	1,520	1,518	1,522	1,562
Central African Republic	1,337	1,339	1,338	1,334	1,345	1,335	1,322
Papua New Guinea	1,248	1,245	1,251	1,247	1,237	1,267	1,236
East Timor	1,073	1,007	1,134	1,181	1,236	1,255	1,279
Belize	592	1,426	1,184	1,582	1,540	1,308	986
French Polynesia	540	542	546	533	547	559	563
Qatar	503	490	206	87	17	104	69
New Caledonia	358	2,264	2,616	2,485	2,510	1,841	1,379
Benin	276	156	63	95	60	108	103
Dominica	149	149	149	148	148	148	148
Eritrea	59	59	62	55	59	70	37
Bahrain	30	32	30	30	85	75	54
Fiji				44	24	270	266
