= Miscellaneous electric load =

Miscellaneous electric loads (MELs) in buildings are electric loads resulting from a multitude of devices (electronic and other) excluding main systems for space heating, cooling, water heating, or lighting. MELs are produced by hard-wired and “plug-in” electrical devices that draw power, including office equipment such as desktop computers and monitors, mobile electronics (laptops, tablets, mobile phones, and their charging units), printers, fans, task lighting, and home equipment such as home entertainment centers, kitchen electronics (microwaves, toaster ovens, cooking accessories), bath items (hair dryers, lighted mirrors, and electric hot tubs), and other devices such as security systems and ceiling fans. MELs are gaining greater importance in energy management as personal electronics proliferate and become standard across demographic groups. MELs demand has been rising as a percentage of total energy end-use and is expected to continue rising.

== Description ==
Miscellaneous electric load comes from the power used by a diverse collection of devices that include a wide array of electro-mechanical and electronic equipment that serve specific purposes within the building overall and for specific functions within the facility. Although each device may draw only a small amount of power, as more people use more personal powered devices at home, at work, and everywhere we go, MELs has disproportionately increased as a share of total electricity demand.

- Domestic/Residential Facility MELs: Powered devices found in most single-family homes and multi-family residences include a multitude of small hand-held or tabletop units—for example toasters, televisions, laptops, tablets, and internet routers, and fish tanks; equipment with higher power draws, such as pool pumps, well pumps, home workshops, are present in fewer residential properties. On average, home entertainment equipment, including televisions, audio equipment, and computers, make up about half of the total MELs in a United States home. About 13 percent of MELs come from devices in standby mode.
- Commercial/Institutional/Government Facility MELs: Powered devices frequently found in office buildings, cultural facilities (e.g. libraries, museums, entertainment venues), schools and higher education institutions, and hospitality venues are often similar to those found in homes but at greater size, scale and density.
- Industrial/Culinary/Technical/Laboratory/Healthcare Facility MELs: Powered devices and equipment in a range of specialized facilities are exceptionally diverse and often underestimated or unmeasured.

In the United States and Europe, MELs comprise nearly one quarter of residential energy use, larger than either heating or cooling energy end-use. In Passive Haus and other low-energy houses, this percentage increases due to dramatic whole-house energy efficiency improvements while MELs remain largely unaltered.

MELs are known by other terms elsewhere in the world, e.g. as "Small Power" in the United Kingdom and Ireland.

== Significance to zero-energy buildings ==
Reducing energy loads of main systems equipment providing heating, cooling and water heating can be achieved by upgrading physical equipment including replacing older equipment with newer, more energy-efficient units, upgrading the building envelope with insulation and higher-grade windows, creating more efficient zoning within heating/cooling air distribution ducts, and deployment of advanced operating technologies such as building automation systems (BAS) and building energy management systems (BEM). None of these options enable management or control of MELs. Thus, MELs have been a significant obstacle in the effort to create zero-energy buildings.

MELs are more difficult to quantify and manage due to their diversity, the limitations of conventional building energy metering, and the lack of energy management systems in the majority of existing building stock, especially older properties and small buildings.

It has been a generally accepted principle that, given these constraints, MELs could not be cost-effectively monitored or managed by means other than product selection decisions and occupant conservation methods. These include choosing more efficient electronics (for example, Energy Star appliances), using fewer electronic devices, managing standby power modes, and raising awareness of personal energy usage and energy peak cost periods to modify behavior.

However, recent advances in three technology areas is fostering next generation energy management solutions including a new pathway for cost-effective MELs monitoring and control solutions: 1) environmental and electrical sensor technologies, 2) cloud computing capacity and access to support AI and machine learning, and 3) wide acceptance of cloud-based software-as-a-service options by organizations of all types and sizes.

== Energy feedback devices ==
One reason MELs are difficult to reduce is because the use of small electric devices are controlled directly by a building's inhabitants. One way to reduce MELs is by the use of energy feedback devices which report real-time energy use to a house's occupants. The use of these devices has been tested in numerous studies which suggest whole-house savings of 5%-15%. With recent advances in technology, energy feedback devices can be purchased for less than $100. Feedback devices allow people to identify and reduce standby power and as well as cut back on unnecessary power draws. In addition, occupants can see the effects of running pool pumps/heaters, supplemental space heaters, air conditioners, etc. Energy feedback devices can further assist zero energy buildings, where it is desirable to align electric loads with photovoltaic panel output.

== See also ==
- The Energy Detective
- Energy Star
- Plug load
