= Lomm =

Lomm Lóm (Limburgish)
- Dorp
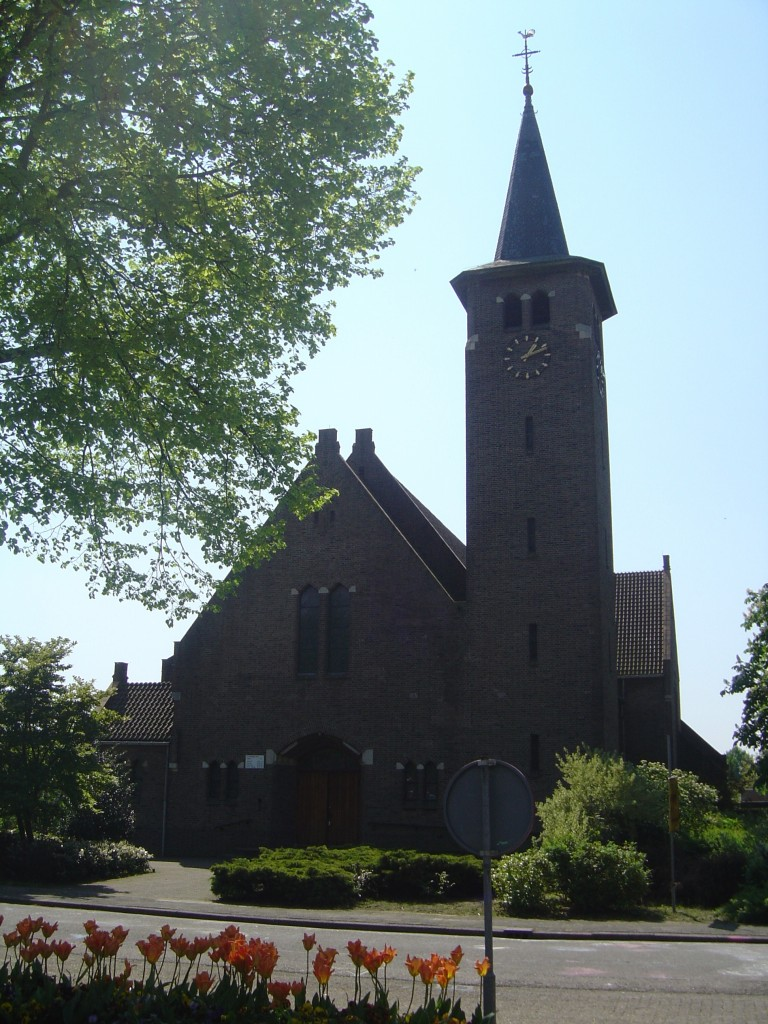

- Location within Netherlands
- Coordinates: 51°26′50″N 6°10′9″E
- Country: Netherlands
- Province: Limburg
- Municipality: Venlo

Area
  - Total: 8.07 km^{2} (3.12 sq mi)

Population (2011)
  - Total: 1,015
- Postal code: 5943
- Area code: 077

Lomm (Dutch: [ˈlɔm]; Limburgish: Lóm [ˈlʊm]) is a small village in the municipality of Venlo, the Netherlands, seven kilometres to the north of Venlo. There were 1,035 inhabitants in 2021.
