= ASUE (Germany) =

German environmental and energy organization

- Industry: Energy-saving Technologies
- Founded: 1977; 49 years ago
- Headquarters: Germany
- Key people: Jürgen Stefan Kukuk, Managing Director; Dr. Ludwig Möhring, President

ASUE (Arbeitsgemeinschaft für Sparsamen und Umweltfreundlichen Energieverbrauch e. V.) - The Association for the Efficient and Environmentally Friendly Use of Energy - is a German association founded in 1977.

The association's aim is to assist in the development and production of energy-saving and eco-friendly technologies. Its members include over 40 companies and corporations in the German gas industry.
