= List of botanical gardens and arboretums in Maine =

This list of botanical gardens and arboretums in Maine is intended to include all significant botanical gardens and arboretums in the U.S. state of Maine

Name	Image	Affiliation	City
Mount Desert Land & Garden Preserve: Abby Aldrich Rockefeller Garden; Asticou Azalea Garden; Thuya Garden; Little Long Pond & Natural Lands			Mount Desert Island, Maine
Carnegie Science Arboretum		Bates College	Lewiston
Coastal Maine Botanical Gardens			Boothbay
Ecotat Gardens and Arboretum			Hermon
Fay Hyland Botanical Plantation		University of Maine	Orono
Harvey Butler Memorial Rhododendron Sanctuary			Springvale
Lyle E. Littlefield Ornamentals Trial Garden		University of Maine	Orono
Longfellow Arboretum			Portland
Perkins Arboretum		Colby College	Waterville
Shoreway Arboretum		Southern Maine Community College	South Portland
Wild Gardens of Acadia		Acadia National Park	Mount Desert Island
Viles Arboretum			Augusta

== See also ==
- List of botanical gardens and arboretums in the United States
