= Bear Creek Forest =

Park in Gadsden County, Florida

Coordinates: 30.474°N 84.619°W

Bear Creek Educational Forest is a park in Gadsden County, Florida, part of Lake Talquin State Forest. It is located south of Quincy, Florida off SR 267, and is 30 minutes from Tallahassee. It has a classroom, picnic area, restrooms, and trails; educational programs are offered. Among its flora are mountain laurel, rhododendron, partridge berry, trillium, spruce pine, loblolly pine, beech, chestnut oak, sparkleberry, buckeye, and yaupon, as well as an ancient American holly.

Before 1990 it was a nature park. In 2015 a ten-year anniversary celebration was planned for Bear Creek Educational Forest.

== See also ==
- Lake Talquin State Forest
