= LEED =

Standard for green building design

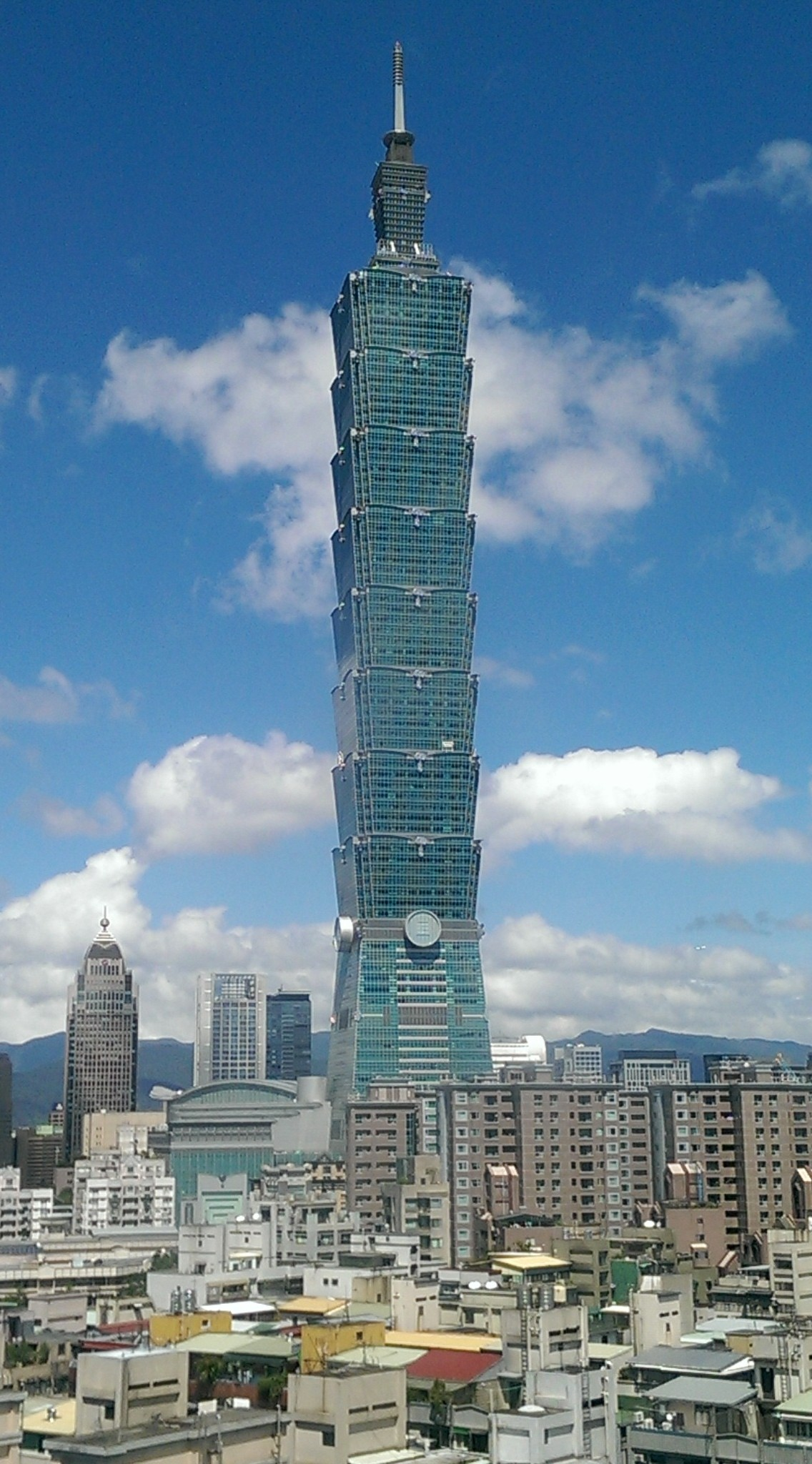
Taipei 101 has achieved LEED Platinum certification several times.

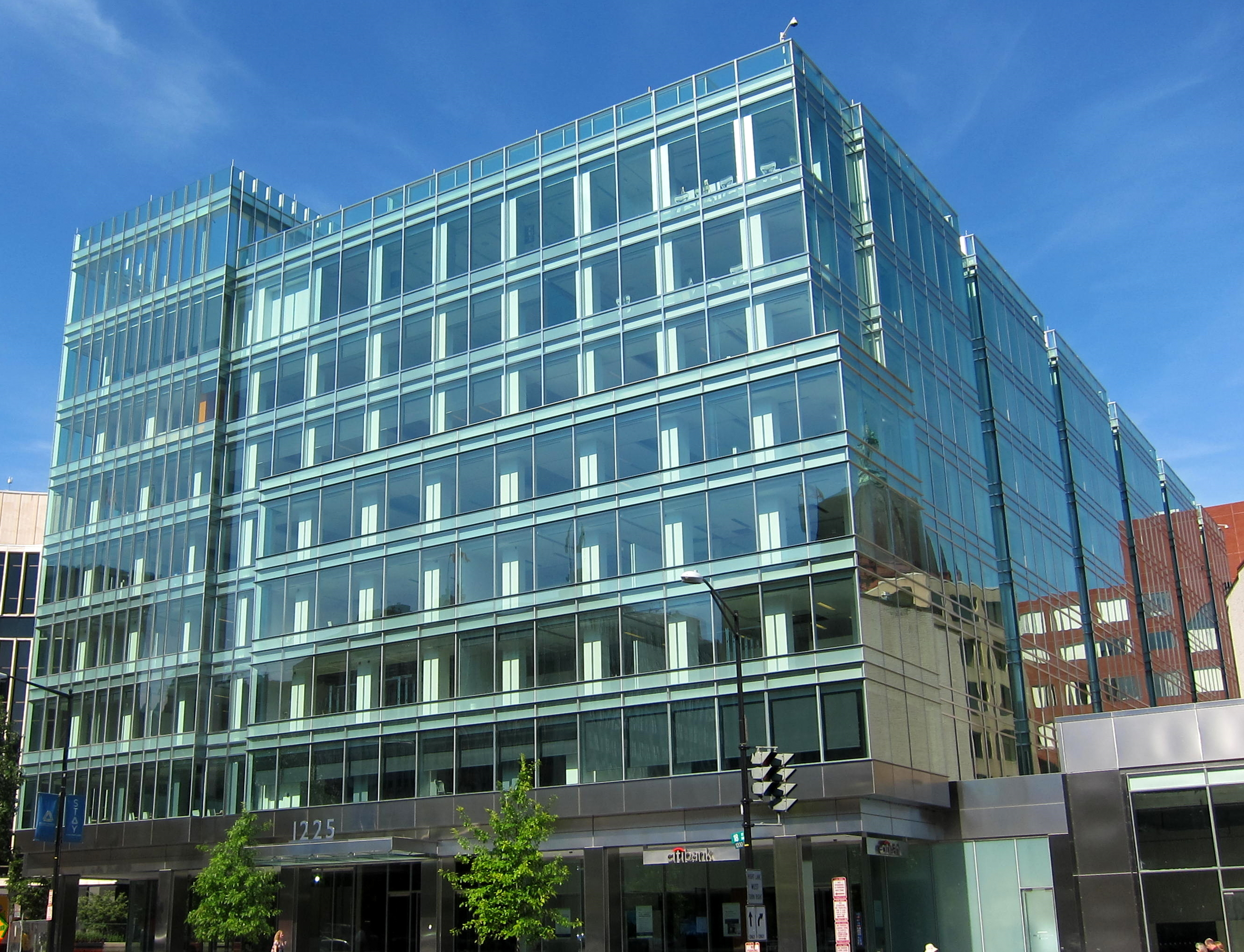
Washington, D.C., is the first LEED Platinum city in the world. Pictured is 1225 Connecticut Avenue, the first redeveloped office building on the U.S. East Coast to receive LEED Platinum status.

Leadership in Energy and Environmental Design (LEED) is a green building certification program used worldwide. Developed by the non-profit U.S. Green Building Council (USGBC), it includes a set of rating systems for the design, construction, operation, and maintenance of green buildings, homes, and neighborhoods, which aims to help building owners and operators be environmentally responsible and use resources efficiently.

As of 2024 there were over 195,000 LEED-certified buildings and over 205,000 LEED-accredited professionals in 186 countries worldwide. In the US, the District of Columbia consistently leads in LEED-certified square footage per capita, followed in 2022 by the top-ranking states of Massachusetts, Illinois, New York, California, and Maryland. Outside the United States, the top-ranking countries for 2022 were Mainland China, India, Canada, Brazil, and Sweden. LEED Canada has developed a separate rating system adapted to the Canadian climate and regulations.

Many U.S. federal agencies, state and local governments require or reward LEED certification. As of 2022, based on certified square feet per capita, the leading five states (after the District of Columbia) were Massachusetts, Illinois, New York, California, and Maryland. Incentives can include tax credits, zoning allowances, reduced fees, and expedited permitting. Offices, healthcare-, and education-related buildings are the most frequent LEED-certified buildings in the US (over 60%), followed by warehouses, distribution centers, retail projects and multifamily dwellings (another 20%). Studies have found that for-rent LEED office spaces generally have higher rents and occupancy rates and lower capitalization rates.

LEED is a design tool rather than a performance-measurement tool and has tended to focus on energy modeling rather than actual energy consumption. It has been criticized for a point system that can lead to inappropriate design choices and the prioritization of LEED certification points over actual energy conservation; for lacking climate specificity; for not sufficiently addressing issues of climate change and extreme weather; and for not incorporating principles of a circular economy. Draft versions of LEED v5 were released for public comment in 2024, and the final version of LEED v5 appeared in April 2025. It may address some of the previous criticisms.

Despite concerns, LEED has been described as a "transformative force in the design and construction industry". LEED is credited with providing a framework for green building, expanding the use of green practices and products in buildings, encouraging sustainable forestry, and helping professionals to consider buildings in terms of the well-being of their occupants and as part of larger systems.

== History ==
In April 1993, the U.S. Green Building Council (USGBC) was founded by Rick Fedrizzi, the head of environmental marketing at Carrier, real estate developer David Gottfried, and environmental lawyer Michael Italiano. Representatives from 60 firms and nonprofits met at the American Institute of Architects to discuss organizing within the building industry to support green building and develop a green building rating system. Also influential early on was architect Bob Berkebile.

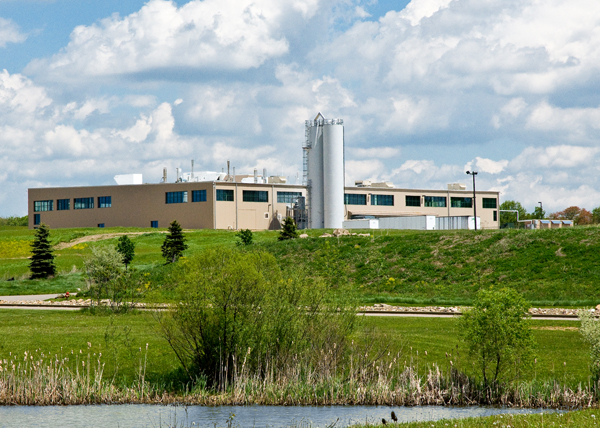
Shearer's Foods plant in Massillon, Ohio, was the first food manufacturing plant to receive LEED Platinum status in 2009.

Fedrizzi served as the volunteer founding chair of USGBC from 1993 to 2004, and became its CEO as of 2004. As of November 4, 2016, he was succeeded as president and CEO of USGBC by Mahesh Ramanujam. Ramanujam served as CEO until 2021. Peter Templeton became interim president and CEO of USGBC as of November 1, 2021.

A key player in developing the Leadership in Energy and Environmental Design (LEED) green certification program was Natural Resources Defense Council (NRDC) senior scientist Robert K. Watson. It was Watson, sometimes referred to as the "Founding Father of LEED", who created the acronym.

Over two decades, Watson led a broad-based consensus process, bringing together non-profit organizations, government agencies, architects, engineers, developers, builders, product manufacturers and other industry leaders. The original planning group consisted of Watson, Mike Italiano, architect Bill Reed (founding LEED Technical Committee co-chair 1994–2003), architect Sandy Mendler, builder Gerard Heiber and engineer Richard Bourne.

Tom Paladino and Lynne Barker (formerly King) co-chaired the LEED Pilot Committee from 1996–2001. Scot Horst chaired the LEED Steering Committee beginning in 2005 and was deeply involved in the development of LEED 2009. Joel Ann Todd took over as chair of the steering committee from 2009 to 2013, working to develop LEED v4, and introducing social equity credits. Other steering committee chairs include Chris Schaffner (2019) and Jennifer Sanguinetti (2020). Chairs of the USGBC's Energy and Atmosphere Technical Advisory Group for LEED technology have included Gregory Kats.

The LEED initiative has been strongly supported by the USGBC Board of Directors, including Chair of the Board of Directors Steven Winter (1999–2003). The current chair of the Board of Directors is Anyeley Hallová (2023).

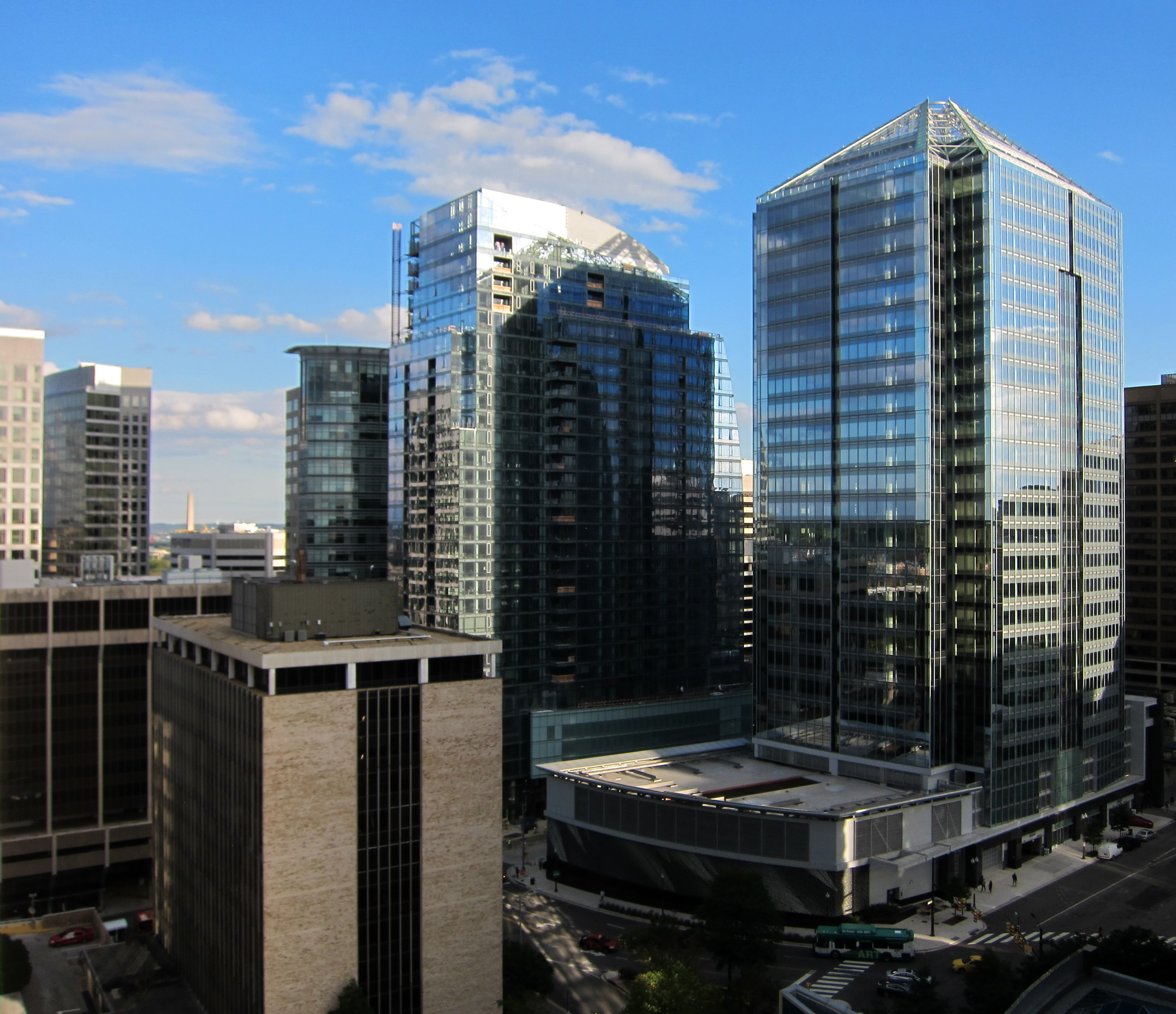
Arlington County, Virginia, was the first LEED Platinum community in the world in 2017. Pictured is 1812 N Moore, the tallest LEED Platinum building in the Washington metropolitan area as of 2013.

LEED has grown from one standard for new construction to a comprehensive system of interrelated standards covering aspects from the design and construction to the maintenance and operation of buildings. LEED has also grown from six committee volunteers to an organization of 122,626 volunteers, professionals and staff.

As of 2023, more than 185,000 LEED projects representing over 28 billion square feet (2.6×10^{9} m^{2}) have been proposed worldwide, and more than 105,000 projects representing over 12 billion square feet (1.1×10^{9} m^{2}) have been certified in 185 countries.

However, lumber, chemical and plastics trade groups have lobbied to weaken the application of LEED guidelines in several southern states. In 2013, the states of Alabama, Georgia and Mississippi effectively banned the use of LEED in new public buildings, in favor of other industry standards that the USGBC considers too lax. LEED is considered a target of a type of disinformation attack known as astroturfing, involving "fake grassroots organizations usually sponsored by large corporations".

Unlike model building codes, such as the International Building Code, only members of the USGBC and specific "in-house" committees may add to, subtract from, or edit the standard, subject to an internal review process. Proposals to modify the LEED standards are offered and publicly reviewed by USGBC's member organizations, of which there were 4551 as of October 2023.

== Rating systems ==
LEED has evolved since 1998 to more accurately represent and incorporate emerging green building technologies. LEED has developed building programs specific to new construction (NC), core and shell (CS), commercial interiors (CI), existing buildings (EB), neighborhood development (ND), homes (LEED for Homes), retail, schools, and healthcare.

The pilot version, LEED New Construction (NC) v1.0, led to LEED NCv2.0, LEED NCv2.2 in 2005, LEED 2009 (a.k.a. LEED v3) in 2009, and LEED v4 in November 2013. LEED 2009 was depreciated for new projects registered from October 31, 2016. LEED v4.1 was released on April 2, 2019.

Draft versions of LEED v5 were released and revised in response to public comment during 2024. The official final version of LEED v5 was released in April 2025. Future updates to the standard are planned to occur every five years.

LEED forms the basis for other sustainability rating systems such as the U.S. Environmental Protection Agency's (EPA) Labs21 and LEED Canada. The Australian Green Star is based on both LEED and the UK's Building Research Establishment Environmental Assessment Methodology (BREEAM).

=== LEED v3 (2009) ===
LEED 2009 encompasses ten rating systems for the design, construction and operation of buildings, homes and neighborhoods. Five overarching categories correspond to the specialties available under the LEED professional program. That suite consists of:

- Green building design and construction (BD+C) – for new construction, core and shell, (Note: Core and shell is a construction concept in which the building owner constructs the base building of trunk infrastructure (core) and exterior (shell) while fit-out works are left to the tenants.) schools, retail spaces (new constructions and major renovations), and healthcare facilities
- Green interior design and construction – for commercial and retail interiors
- Green building operations and maintenance
- Green neighborhood development
- Green home design and construction (Note: The LEED for Homes rating system is different from LEED v3, with different point categories and thresholds that reward efficient residential design. These Guidelines were also adopted by the Department of Energy's Net Zero Energy Homes Project which J. D. Polk brought to the DOE in 2005.)

LEED v3 aligned credits across all LEED rating systems, weighted by environmental priority. It reflects a continuous development process, with a revised third-party certification program and online resources.

Under LEED 2009, an evaluated project scores points to a possible maximum of 100 across six categories: sustainable sites (SS), water efficiency (WE), energy and atmosphere (EA), materials and resources (MR), indoor environment quality (IEQ) and design innovation (INNO). Each of these categories also includes mandatory requirements, which receive no points. Up to 10 additional points may be earned: 4 for regional priority credits and 6 for innovation in design. Additional performance categories for residences (LEED for Homes) recognize the importance of transportation access, open space, and outdoor physical activity, and the need for buildings and settlements to educate occupants. (Note: The LEED for Homes guidelines were also adopted by the DOE Net Zero Energy Homes Project.)

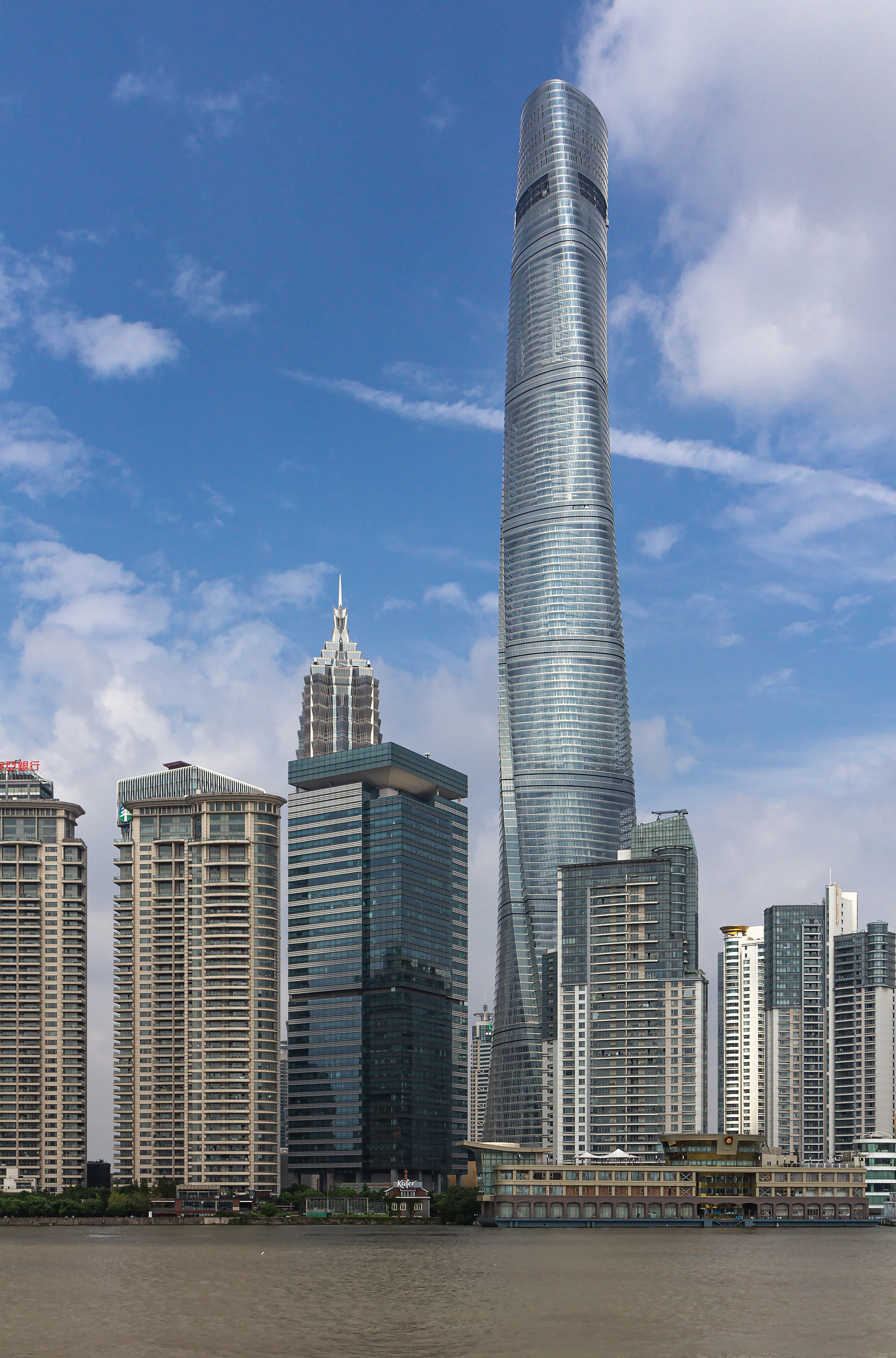
Shanghai Tower, the tallest and largest LEED Platinum certified building in the world since 2015.

Buildings can qualify for four levels of certification:

- Certified: 40–49 points
- Silver: 50–59 points
- Gold: 60–79 points
- Platinum: 80 points and above

The aim of LEED 2009 is to allocate points "based on the potential environmental impacts and human benefits of each credit". These are weighed using the environmental impact categories of the EPA's Tools for the Reduction and Assessment of Chemical and Other Environmental Impacts (TRACI) and the environmental-impact weighting scheme developed by the National Institute of Standards and Technology (NIST).

Prior to LEED 2009 evaluation and certification, a building must comply with minimum requirements including environmental laws and regulations, occupancy scenarios, building permanence and pre-rating completion, site boundaries and area-to-site ratios. Its owner must share data on the building's energy and water use for five years after occupancy (for new construction) or date of certification (for existing buildings).

The credit weighting process has the following steps: First, a collection of reference buildings are assessed to estimate the environmental impacts of similar buildings. NIST weightings are then applied to judge the relative importance of these impacts in each category. Data regarding actual impacts on environmental and human health are then used to assign points to individual categories and measures. This system results in a weighted average for each rating scheme based upon actual impacts and the relative importance of those impacts to human health and environmental quality.

The LEED council also appears to have assigned credit and measured weighting based upon the market implications of point allocation.

From 2010, buildings can use carbon offsets to achieve green power credits for LEED-NC (new construction certification).

=== LEED v4 (2014) ===
For LEED BD+C v4 credit, the IEQ category addresses thermal, visual, and acoustic comfort as well as indoor air quality. Laboratory and field research have directly linked occupants' satisfaction and performance to the building's thermal conditions. Energy reduction goals can be supported while improving thermal satisfaction. For example, providing occupants control over the thermostat or operable windows allows for comfort across a wider range of temperatures.

=== LEED v4.1 (2019) ===
On April 2, 2019, the USGBC released LEED v4.1, a new version of the LEED green building program, designed for use with cities, communities and homes. However, LEED v4.1 was never officially balloted.

An update to v4, proposed as of November 22, 2022, took effect on March 1, 2024. Any projects that register under LEED v4 after March 1, 2024 must meet these updated guidelines.

=== LEED v5 (2025) ===
As of January 2023, USGBC began to develop LEED v5. LEED v5 is the first version of the LEED rating system to be based on the June 2022 Future of LEED principles. The LEED v5 rating system covers both new construction and existing buildings.

An initial draft version was discussed at Greenbuild 2023. The beta draft of LEED v5 was released for an initial period of public comment on April 3, 2024. Changes were made in response to nearly 6,000 comments. A second public comment period was opened for the revised version, from September 27 to October 28, 2024. LEED v5 was officially released in 2025. Future updates of the certification system are planned to occur every five years.

LEED v5 reorganizes the credit system and prerequisites and has a greater focus on the decarbonization of buildings. The scorecard expresses three global goals of climate action (worth 50% of the certification points), quality of life (25%) and conservation and ecological restoration (25%) in terms of five principles: decarbonization, ecosystems, equity, health and resilience. One of the responses to public comments was to emphasize a data-driven approach to Operations and Maintenance by more clearly identifying performance-based credits (80% of points) and decoupling them from strategic credits (20%).

Dozens of bird advocacy organizations and experts criticized USGBC for watering down protections for birds against bird building collisions in LEED v5. As primary feedback to USGBC, they argued that USGBC should not certify any building as "green" or "sustainable" if it does not adhere to bird-friendly design and could kill birds. Signatories to a public letter addressed to USGBC asked for the new Bird-friendly Glass credit in LEED v5 to be worth at least 3 points, not just 1 point, because of the significant toll that building collisions take on bird populations. While a "listening session" was convened between USGBC and some leading bird collision experts in June 2025, no subsequent changes were made to LEED v5 to address advocates' concerns.

=== LEED Canada ===
In 2003, the Canada Green Building Council (CAGBC) received permission to create LEED Canada-NC v1.0, which was based upon LEED-NC 2.0. As of 2021, Canada ranked second in the world (not including the USA) in its number of LEED-certified projects and square feet of space. Buildings in Canada such as Winnipeg's Canadian Museum for Human Rights are LEED certified due to practices including the use of rainwater harvesting, green roofs, and natural lighting.

As of March 18, 2022, the Canada Green Building Council took over direct oversight for LEED™ green building certification of projects in Canada, formerly done by GBCI Canada. CAGBC will continue to work with Green Business Certification Inc. (GBCI) and USGBC while consolidating certification and credentialing for CAGBC's Zero Carbon Building Standards, LEED, TRUE, and Investor Ready Energy Efficiency (IREE). IREE is a model supported by CAGBC and the Canada Infrastructure Bank (CIB) for the verification of proposed retrofit projects.

=== Certification process ===
LEED certification is granted by the Green Building Certification Institute (GBCI), which arranges third-party verification of a project's compliance with the LEED requirements. The certification process for design teams consists of the design application, under the purview of the architect and the engineer and documented in the official construction drawings, and the construction application, under the purview of the building contractor and documented during the construction and commissioning of the building.

A fee is required to register the building, and to submit the design and construction applications. Total fees are assessed based on building area, ranging from a minimum of $2,900 to over $1 million for a large project. "Soft" costs – i.e., added costs to the building project to qualify for LEED certification – may range from 1% to 6% of the total project cost. The average cost increase was about 2%, or an extra $3–$5 per square foot.

The application review and certification process is conducted through LEED Online, USGBC's web-based service. The GBCI also utilizes LEED Online to conduct their reviews.

=== LEED energy modeling ===
Applicants have the option of achieving credit points by building energy models. (Note: The Optimize Energy Performance credit energy models must follow the methodologies outlined in Appendix G of the ASHRAE 90.1 building energy standard.) One model represents the building as designed, and a second model represents a baseline building in the same location, with the same geometry and occupancy. Depending on location (climate) and building size, the standard provides requirements for heating, ventilation and air-conditioning (HVAC) system type, and wall and window definitions. This allows for a comparison with emphasis on factors that heavily influence energy consumption when considering design decisions.

=== LEED for Homes rating system ===
The LEED for Homes rating system was first piloted in 2005. It has been available in countries including the U.S., Canada, Sweden, and India. LEED for Homes projects are low-rise residential.

The process of the LEED for Homes rating system differs significantly from the LEED rating system for new construction. Unlike LEED, LEED for Homes requires an on-site inspection. LEED for Homes projects are required to work with either an American or a Canadian provider organization and a green rater. The provider organization helps the project through the process while overseeing the green raters, individuals who conduct two mandatory site inspections: the thermal bypass inspection and the final inspection. The provider and rater assist in the certification process but do not themselves certify the project.

=== Professional accreditation ===
In addition to certifying projects pursuing LEED, the Green Business Certification Inc. (GBCI) offers various accreditations to people who demonstrate knowledge of the LEED rating system, including LEED Accredited Professional (LEED AP), LEED Green Associate, and LEED Fellow.

The Green Business Certification Inc. (GBCI) describes its LEED professional accreditation as "demonstrat[ing] current knowledge of green building technologies, best practices" and the LEED rating system to assure the holder's competency as one of "the most qualified, educated, and influential green building professionals in the marketplace."

== Criticism ==
Critics of LEED certification such as Auden Schendler and Randy Udall have pointed out that the process is slow, complicated, and expensive. In 2005, they published an article titled "LEED is Broken; Let's Fix It", in which they argued that the certification process "makes green building more difficult than it needs to be" and called for changes "to make LEED easier to use and more popular" to better accelerate the transition to green building.

Schendler and Udall also identified a pattern which they call "LEED brain", in which participants may become focused on "point mongering" and pick and choose design elements that do not actually go well together or do not fit local conditions, to gain points. The public relations value of LEED certification begins to drive the development of buildings rather than focusing on design. They give the example of debating whether to add a reflective roof, which can counter "heat island" effects in urban areas, to a building high in the Rocky Mountains. A 2012 USA Today review of 7,100 LEED-certified commercial buildings found that designers tended to choose easier points such as using recycled materials, rather than more challenging ones that could increase the energy efficiency of a building.

Critics such as David Owen and Jeff Speck also point out that LEED certification focuses on the building itself, and does not take into account factors such as the location in which the building stands, or how employee commutes may be affected by a relocation. In Green Metropolis (2009), Owen discusses an environmentally-friendly building in San Bruno, California, built by Gap Inc., which was located 16 miles (26 km) from the company's corporate headquarters in downtown San Francisco, and 15 miles (24 km) from Gap's corporate campus in Mission Bay. Although the company added shuttle buses between buildings, "no bus is as green as an elevator". Similarly, in Walkable City (2013), Jeff Speck describes the relocation of the Environmental Protection Agency's Region 7 Headquarters from downtown Kansas City, Missouri, to a LEED-certified building 20 miles (32 km) away in the suburb of Lenexa, Kansas. Kaid Benfield of the Natural Resources Defense Council estimated that the carbon emissions associated with the additional miles driven were almost three times higher than before, a change from 0.39 metric tons per person per month to 1.08 metric tons of carbon dioxide per person per month. Speck writes that "The carbon saved by the new building's LEED status, if any, will be a small fraction of the carbon wasted by its location". Both Speck and Owen make the point that a building-centric standard that does not consider location will inevitably undervalue the benefits of people living closer together in cities, compared to the costs of automobile-oriented suburban sprawl.

== Assessment ==
LEED is a design tool and as such has focused on energy modeling, rather than being a performance-measurement tool that measures actual energy consumption. LEED uses modeling software to predict future energy use based on intended use. Buildings certified under LEED do not have to prove energy or water efficiency in practice to receive LEED certification points. This has led to criticism of LEED's ability to accurately determine the efficiency of buildings, and concerns about the accuracy of its predictive models.

Research papers provide most of what is known about the performance and effectiveness of LEED models and buildings. Much of the available research predates 2014, and therefore applies to buildings that were designed under early versions of the LEED rating and certification systems, LEED v3 (2009) or earlier. Research papers have tended to address performance and effectiveness of LEED in two credit category areas: energy (EA) and indoor environment quality (IEQ).

Many early analyses should be considered as at best preliminary. Studies should be repeated with longer data history and larger building samples, include newer LEED certified buildings, and clearly identify green-building rating schemes and certification levels of individual buildings. Buildings may also need to be grouped according to location, since local conditions and regulation may influence building design and confound assessment results.

=== Modelling assessment ===
In 2018, Pushkar examined LEED-NC 2009 (v3) Certified-level certified projects from countries in northern (Finland, Sweden) and southern (Turkey, Spain) regions of Europe to see how different types of credits are understood and applied. Pushkar found that credit achievements were similar within regions and countries for Indoor Environmental Quality (EQ), Materials and Resources (MR), Sustainable Sites (SS), and Water Efficiency (WE), but differed for Energy and Atmosphere (EA). Sustainable Sites (SS) and Water Efficiency (WE) were high achievement areas, scoring 80–100% and 70–75%; Indoor Environmental Quality was intermediate (40–60%); and Materials and Resources (MR) was low (20–40%). Energy and Atmosphere (EA) was intermediate (60–65%) in northern Europe, and low (40%) in southern Europe. These results examine the extent to which different credits have been chosen by modellers.

=== Energy performance research (EA) ===
Because LEED focuses on the design of the building and not on its actual energy consumption, it has been suggested that LEED buildings should be tracked to discover whether the potential energy savings from the design are being used in practice.

In 2009, architectural scientist Guy Newsham (et al.) of the National Research Council of Canada (NRC) re-analyzed a dataset of 100 LEED certified (v3 or earlier version) buildings. The data included only "medium use" buildings, and did not include 21 laboratories, data centers and supermarkets which were expected to have higher energy activity. Researchers further attempted to match each building with a conventional building within the Commercial Building Energy Consumption Survey (CBECS) database according to building type and occupancy. On average, the LEED buildings consumed 18 to 39% less energy by floor area than the conventional buildings. However, 28 to 35% of LEED-certified buildings used more energy. The paper found no correlation between the number of energy points achieved or LEED certification level and measured building performance.

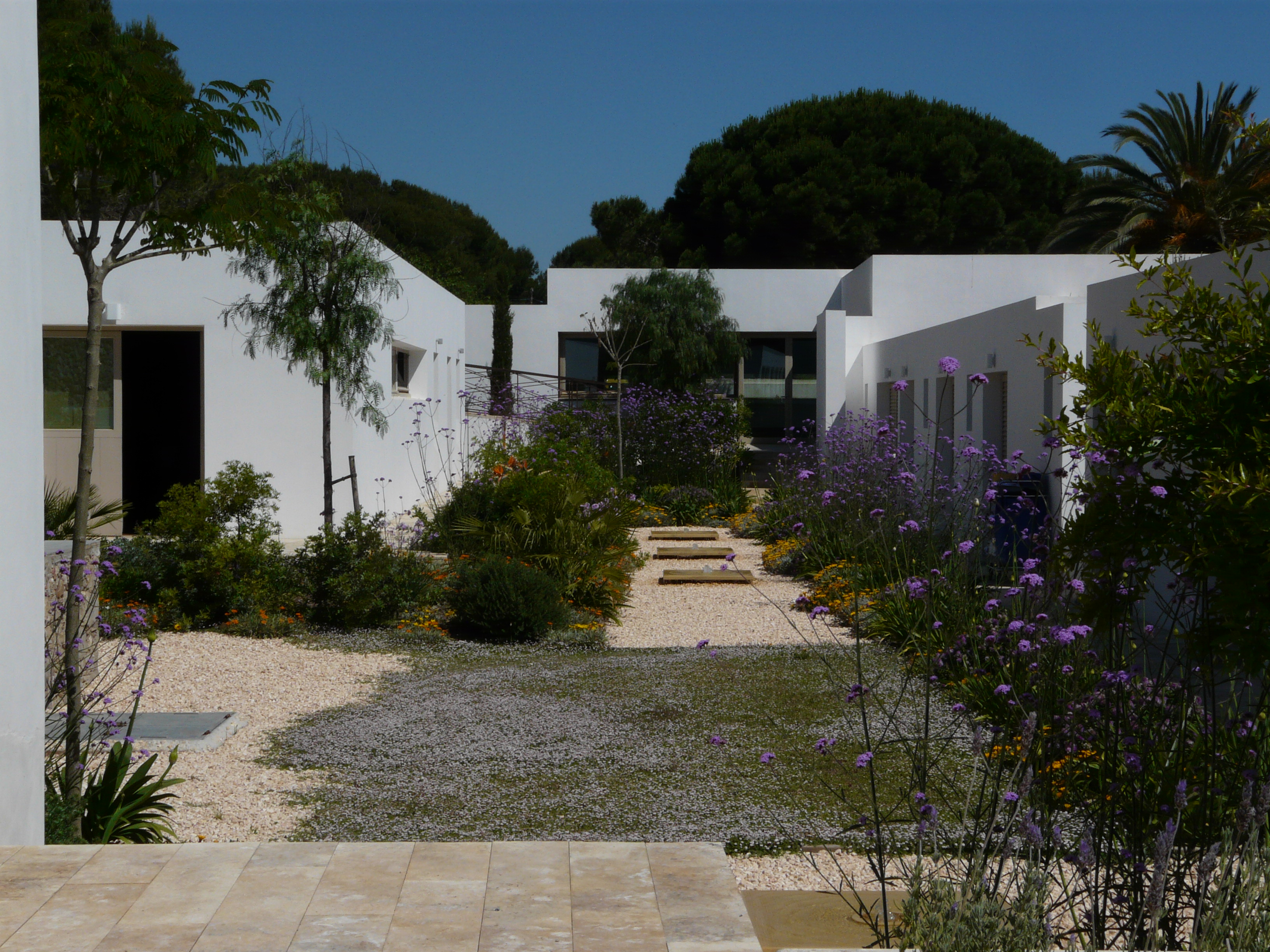
The Hostal Empúries was the first LEED (LEED Gold) certified hotel in Europe

In 2009 physicist John Scofield published an article in response to Newsham et al., analyzing the same database of LEED buildings and arriving at different conclusions. Scofield criticized the earlier analysis for focusing on energy per floor area instead of a total energy consumption. Scofield considered source energy (accounting for energy losses during generation and transmission) as well as site energy, and used area-weighted energy use intensities (EUIs) (energy per unit area per year), when comparing buildings to account for the fact that larger buildings tend to have larger EUIs. Scofield concluded that, collectively, the LEED-certified buildings showed no significant source energy consumption savings or greenhouse gas emission reductions when compared to non-LEED buildings, although they did consume 10–17% less site energy.

Scofield notes the difficulties of building analysis, given both the lack of a randomly selected sample of LEED buildings, and the diversity of factors involved when selecting a comparison group of non-LEED buildings. In 2013 Scofield identified 21 LEED-certified New York City office buildings with publicly available energy performance data for 2011, out of 953 office buildings in New York City with such data. Results differed with certification level. LEED-Gold buildings were found to use 20% less source energy than conventional buildings. However, buildings at the Silver and Certified levels used 11 to 15% more source energy, on average, than conventional buildings. (Data was not available for Platinum-level buildings.)

An analysis of 132 LEED buildings based on municipal energy benchmarking data from Chicago in 2015 showed that LEED-certified buildings used about 10% less energy on site than comparable conventional buildings. However, the study did not show differences in use of source energy.

In 2014, architect Gwen Fuertes and engineer Stefano Schiavon developed the first study that analyzes plug loads using LEED-documented data from certified projects. The study compared plug load assumptions made by 92 energy modeling practitioners against ASHRAE and Title 24 requirements, and the evaluation of the plug load calculation methodology used by 660 LEED-CI and 429 LEED-NC certified projects. They found that energy modelers only considered the energy consumption of predictable plug loads, such as refrigerators, computers and monitors. Overall the results suggested a disconnection between assumptions in the models and the actual performance of buildings.

Energy modeling might be a source of error during the LEED design phase. Engineers Christopher Stoppel and Fernanda Leite evaluated the predicted and actual energy consumption of two twin buildings using the energy model during the LEED design phase and the utility meter data after one year of occupancy. The study's results suggest that mechanical systems turnover and occupancy assumptions significantly differ from predicted to actual values.

In a 2019 review, Amiri et al. suggest that judging energy efficiency based on source energy may not be appropriate where the availability of energy types depends on city council or government policies. If some types of source energy are not supported locally, there is no opportunity to choose the types of energy promoted by the LEED scoring system. Amiri emphasizes that many studies have weaknesses due to the lack of randomly selected samples of LEED buildings, and the difficulty of selecting comparison groups of non-LEED buildings. Amiri also notes that the standards for building design have changed significantly over time. For example, newer non-LEED buildings may routinely use features such as high-quality windows which were rarely used in older buildings. Comparisons of LEED and non-LEED buildings therefore need to consider age as well as size, use, occupant behavior, and location aspects such as climate zone.

Zhang et al. (2019) examined renewable energy assessment methods and different assessment systems, and noted that LEED-US addresses management problems at the pre-occupancy phase. Interest in Post‐occupancy evaluation (POE), the process of evaluating building performance after occupation, is increasing. This is due in part to concerns about differences between energy models in the design phase and actual use of buildings. POE research emphasizes the need to collect and analyze actual occupancy data from existing buildings, to better understand how people are using spaces and resources.

Asensio and Delmas (2017) carefully matched and compared buildings that did and did not participate in LEED, Energy Star, and Better Buildings Challenge programs in Los Angeles, California. They examined data for monthly energy consumption between 2005–2012, for more than 175,000 commercial buildings. Buildings from all three programs displayed "high magnitude" energy savings, ranging from 18–19% for Better Buildings and Energy Star to 30% for LEED-rated buildings. The three programs saved 210 million kilowatt-hours, equal to 145 kilotons of CO_{2} equivalent emissions per year.

=== IEQ performance research (IEQ) ===
The Centers for Disease Control and Prevention (CDC) defines indoor environmental quality (IEQ) as "the quality of a building's environment in relation to the health and wellbeing of those who occupy space within it." The USGBC includes the following considerations for attaining IEQ credits: indoor air quality, the level of volatile organic compounds (VOC), lighting, thermal comfort, and daylighting and views. In consideration of a building's indoor environmental quality, published studies have also included factors such as: acoustics, building cleanliness and maintenance, colors and textures, workstation size, ceiling height, window access and shading, surface finishes, furniture adaptability and comfort.

The most widely used method for post-occupancy evaluation (POE) in IEQ-related studies is occupant surveys. In 2013, architectural physicist Sergio Altamonte and Stefano Schiavon used occupant surveys from the Center for the Built Environment at Berkeley's database to study IEQ occupant satisfaction in 65 LEED buildings and 79 non-LEED buildings. They analyzed 15 IEQ-related factors including the ease of interaction, building cleanliness, the comfort of furnishing, the amount of light, building maintenance, colors and textures, workplace cleanliness, the amount of space, furniture adjustability, visual comfort, air quality, visual privacy, noise, temperature, and sound privacy. Occupants reported being slightly more satisfied in LEED buildings for the air quality and slightly more dissatisfied with the amount of light. Overall, occupants of both LEED and non-LEED buildings had equal satisfaction with the building overall and with the workspace. The authors noted that the data may not be representative of the entire building stock and a randomized approach was not used in the data assessment.

Newsham et al (2013) carried out an evaluation using both occupant interviews and physical site measurements. Field studies and post-occupancy evaluations (POE) were performed in 12 "green" and 12 conventional buildings across Canada and the northern United States. Most but not all of the "green" buildings were LEED-certified. 2545 occupants completed a questionnaire. On-site, 974 randomly selected workstations were measured for thermal conditions, air quality, acoustics, lighting, workstation size, ceiling height, window access and shading, and surface finishes. Responses were positive in the areas of environmental satisfaction, satisfaction with thermal conditions, satisfaction with outside views, aesthetic appearance, reduced disturbance from HVAC noise, workplace image, night-time sleep quality, mood, physical symptoms, and reduced number of airborne particulates. The green buildings were rated more highly and in the case of airborne particulates exhibited superior performance than the conventional buildings.

Schiavon and Altomonte (2014) found that occupants have equivalent satisfaction levels in LEED and non-LEED buildings when evaluated independently from the following factors: office type, spatial layout, distance from windows, building size, gender, age, type of work, time at workspace, and weekly working hours. LEED certified buildings may provide higher satisfaction in open spaces than in enclosed offices, in smaller buildings than in larger buildings, and to occupants having spent less than one year in their workspaces rather than to those who have used their workspace longer. This study suggests that the positive value of LEED certification as measured by occupant satisfaction may decrease with time.

In 2015, environmental health scientist Joseph Allen (et al.) reviewed studies of indoor environmental quality and the potential health benefits of green-certified buildings. He concluded that green buildings provide better indoor environmental quality with direct benefits to the human health of occupants, compared to non-green buildings. Statistically significant measures from different studies included decreased symptoms of sick building syndrome, decreased sick days, decreased respiratory symptoms during the daytime and asthma symptoms at night, and lowered levels of PM_{2.5}, NO_{2}, and nicotine. However, Allen noted that the frequent use of subjective health performance indicators was a limitations of many of the studies reviewed. He proposed a framework to encourage the use of direct, objective, and leading "Health Performance Indicators" in building assessment.

The daylight credit was updated in LEED v4 to include a simulation option for daylight analysis that uses spatial daylight autonomy (SDA) and annual sunlight exposure (ASE) metrics to evaluate daylight quality in LEED projects. SDA is a metric that measures the annual sufficiency of daylight levels in interior spaces and ASE describes the potential for visual discomfort by direct sunlight and glare. These metrics are approved by the Illuminating Engineering Society of North America (IES) and codified in the LM-83-12 standard. LEED recommends a minimum of 300 lux for at least 50% of total occupied hours of the year for at least 55% of the occupied floor area. The threshold recommended by LEED for ASE is that no more than 10% of regularly occupied floor area can be exposed to more than 1000 lux of direct sunlight for more than 250 hours per year. Additionally, LEED requires window shades to be closed when more than 2% of a space is subject to direct sunlight above 1000 lux. According to building scientist Christopher Reinhart, the direct sunlight requirement is a very stringent approach that can discourage good daylight design. Reinhart proposed the application of the direct sunlight criterion only in spaces that require stringent control of sunlight (e.g. desks, white boards, etc.).

In 2024, Kent et al. compared satisfaction of people in buildings that had received either WELL certification or LEED certification. Ratings of buildings certified with WELL and LEED were matched on six dimensions: award level, years in building, time in workspace, type of workspace, proximity to a window, and floor height. Satisfaction with the overall building and one's workspace were high under both rating systems. However, satisfaction with LEED‑certified buildings (73% and 71%) tended to be lower than that for WELL‑certified buildings (94% and 87%). This may be because WELL is a human-centered standard for building design that focuses primarily on comfort, health, and well-being. In contrast, only 10% of the credits in LEED certification relate to indoor environmental quality (IEQ). Differences may also reflect age of buildings, which were not matched for in the design.

=== Water Efficiency (WE) ===
Water systems involve both water and energy as resources. Outside buildings, the acquisition, treatment, and transportation of water is involved. Inside building, onsite water treatment, heating, and wastewater treatment are issues. Data on the energy use of specific water and wastewater systems is becoming increasingly available. Energy use can sometimes be estimated from public sources. LEED v4 includes a number of credits related to Water Efficiency (WE). Points are awarded for Outdoor Water Use Reduction, Indoor Water Use Reduction and Building-level Water Metering based on predetermined percentage reductions in water or energy use.

There has been criticism that the LEED rating system is not sensitive and does not vary enough with regard to local environmental conditions. For example, there are 16 climate zones in California, with unique weather and temperature patterns. The availability of electricity, water and other resources differs widely in different regions, making it important to consider interconnected systems and supply chain issues. Greer et al. (2019) reviewed renewable energy assessment methods and examined the effectiveness of LEED v4 buildings in California. They examined relationships between the climate mitigation points given for water efficiency (WE) and energy efficiency (EA) and used baseline energy and water budgets to calculate the avoided GHG emissions of buildings. Their calculations both demonstrate mitigation of expected climate change and also indicate high variability in environmental outcomes within the state.

While LEED v4 introduced "Impact Categories" as system goals, Greer suggests that closer linkages are needed between design points and outcomes, and that issues like supply chains, infrastructure, and regionalized variability should be considered. They report that impacts like the mitigation of expected climate change pollution can be calculated, and while "LEED points do not equally reward equal impact mitigation", such differences could be reconciled to better align LEED credits and goals.

=== Innovation in design research (ID) ===
The rise in LEED certification also brought forth a new era of construction and building research and ideation. Architects and designers have begun stressing the importance of occupancy health over high efficiency within new construction and have been trying to engage in more conversations with health professionals. Along with this, they also create buildings to perform better and analyze performance data to upkeep the process. Another way LEED has affected research is that designers and architects focus on creating spaces that are modular and flexible to ensure a longer lifespan while simultaneously sourcing products that are resilient through consistent use.

Innovation in LEED architecture is linked with new designs and high-quality construction. One example is use of nanoparticle technology for consolidation and conservation effects in cultural heritage buildings. This practice began with the use of calcium hydroxide nano-particles in porous structures to improve mechanical strength. Titanium, silica, and aluminum-based compounds may also be used.

Material technology and construction techniques could be among first issues to consider in building design. For the facade of high-rise buildings, such as the Empire State Building, the surface area provides opportunities for design innovation. VOC released from construction materials into the air is another challenge to address.

In Milan, a university-corporate partnership sought to produce semi-transparent solar panels to take the place of ordinary windows in glass-facade high-rise buildings. Similar concepts are under development elsewhere, with considerable market potential.

The Manzara Adalar skyscraper project in Istanbul, designed by Zaha Hadid, saw considerable innovation through the use of communal rooms, outdoor spaces, and natural lighting as part of the Urban Transformation Project of the Kartal port region.

=== Remaining credit areas ===
Other credit areas include: Materials and Resources (MR), and Regional Priority (RP).

=== Financial considerations ===
When a LEED rating is pursued, the cost of initial design and construction may rise. There may be a lack of abundant availability of manufactured building components that meet LEED specifications. There are also added costs in USGBC correspondence, LEED design-aide consultants, and the hiring of the required Commissioning Authority, which are not in themselves necessary for an environmentally responsible project unless seeking LEED certification.

Proponents argue that these higher initial costs can be mitigated by the savings incurred over time due to projected lower-than-industry-standard operational costs typical of a LEED certified building. This life cycle costing is a method for assessing the total cost of ownership, taking into account all costs of acquiring, owning and operating, and the eventual disposal of a building. Additional economic payback may come in the form of employee productivity gains incurred as a result of working in a healthier environment. Studies suggest that an initial up-front investment of 2% extra yields over ten times that initial investment over the life cycle of the building.

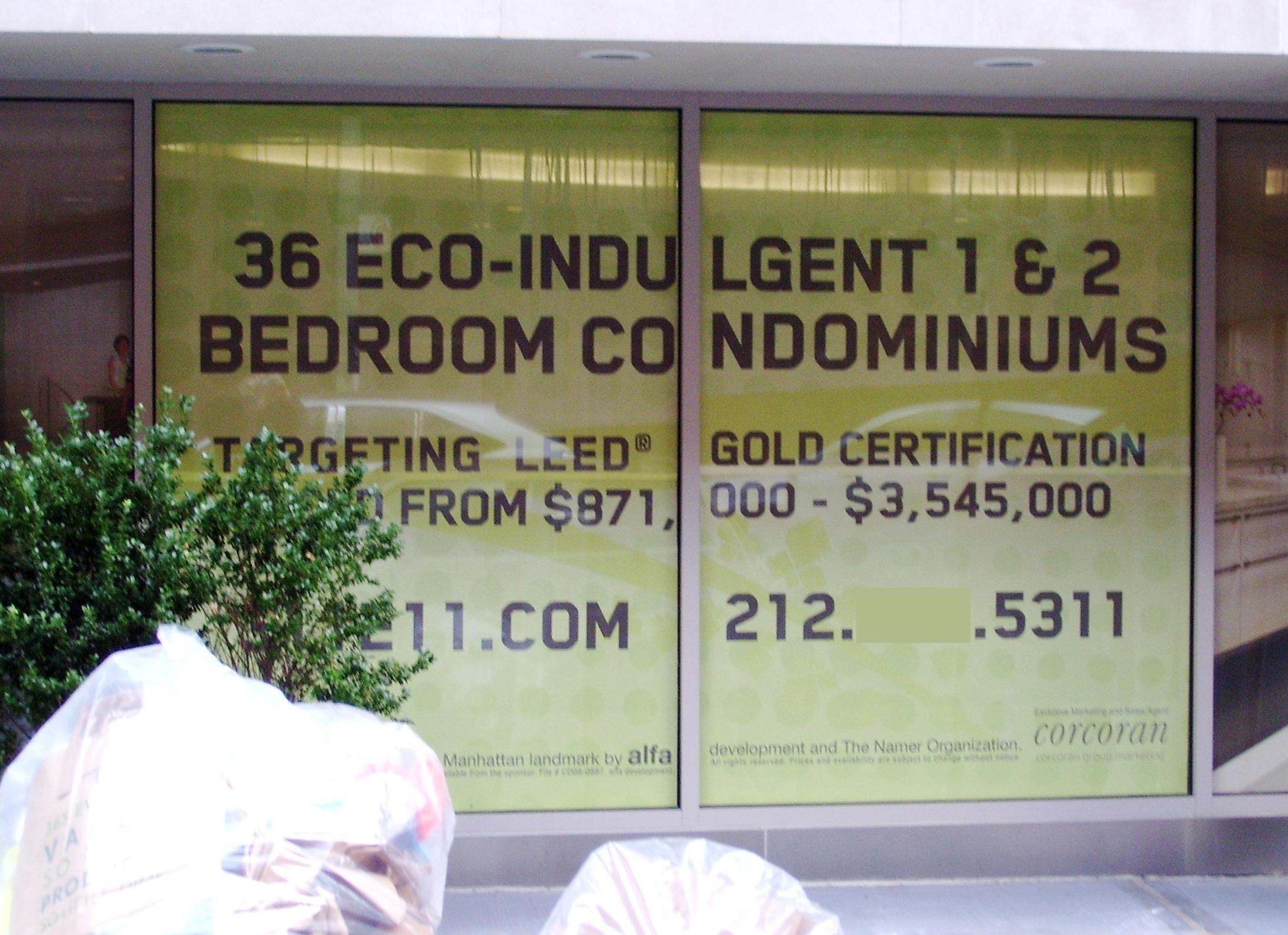
Real estate developers have begun to use LEED certification and a building's green status as selling points.

LEED has been developed and continuously modified by workers in the green building industry, especially in the ten largest metro areas in the U.S.; however, LEED certified buildings have been slower to penetrate small and middle markets.

From a financial perspective, studies from 2008 and 2009 found that LEED for-rent office spaces generally charged higher rent and had higher occupancy rates. Analysis of CoStar Group property data estimated the extra cost for the minimum benefit at 3%, with an additional 2.5% for silver-certified buildings. More recent studies have confirmed earlier findings that certified buildings achieve significantly higher rents, sale prices and occupancy rates as well as lower capitalization rates, potentially reflecting lower investment risk.

== Incentive programs ==
Many federal, state, and local governments and school districts have adopted various types of LEED initiatives and incentives. LEED incentive programs can include tax credits, tax breaks, density zoning bonuses, reduced fees, priority or expedited permitting, free or reduced-cost technical assistance, grants and low-interest loans.

In the United States, states that have provided incentives include California, New York, Delaware, Hawaii, Illinois, Maryland, Nevada, New Mexico, North Carolina, Pennsylvania, and Virginia. Cincinnati, Ohio, provides property tax abatements for newly constructed or rehabilitated commercial or residential properties that earn are LEED certified.

Beginning in June 2013, USGBC has offered free LEED certification to the first LEED-certified project in a country that does not have one.

== Notable certifications ==
=== Directories of LEED-certified projects ===
The USGBC and Canada Green Building Council maintain online directories of U.S. LEED-certified and LEED Canada-certified projects. In 2012 the USGBC launched the Green Building Information Gateway (GBIG) to connect green building efforts and projects worldwide. It provides searchable access to a database of activities, buildings, places and collections of green building-related information from many sources and programs, including LEED projects. A number of sites including the Canada Green Building Council (CaGBC) Project Database list resources relating to LEED buildings in Canada.

=== Platinum certification ===
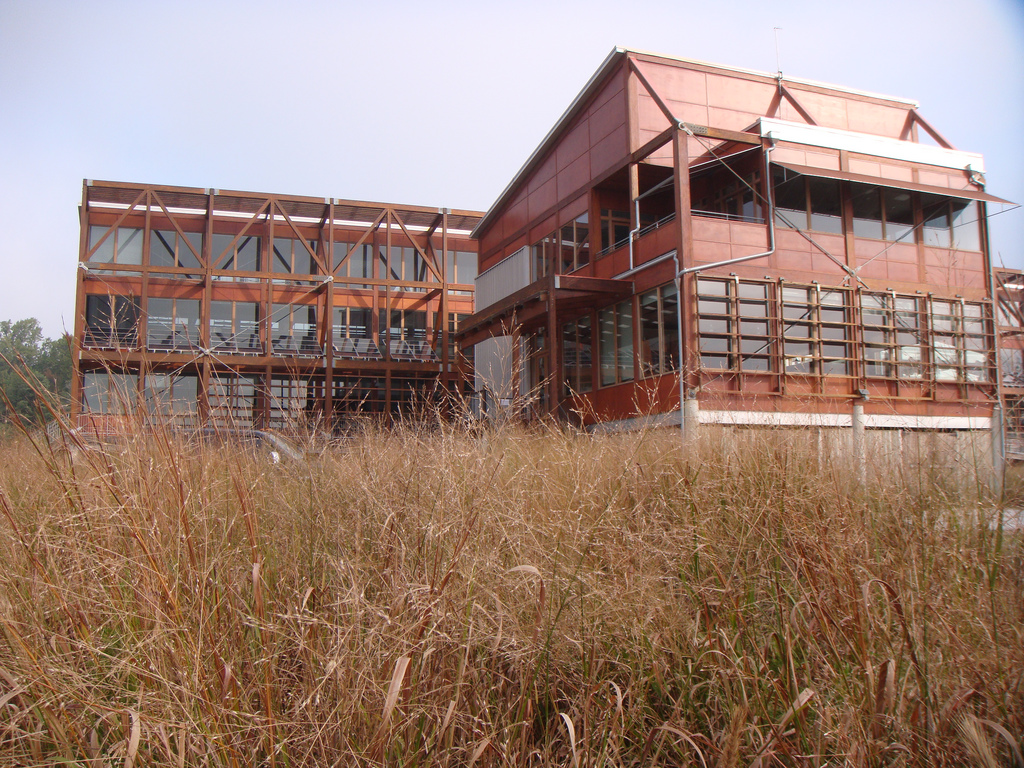
The Philip Merrill Environmental Center

The Philip Merrill Environmental Center in Annapolis, Maryland was the first building to receive a LEED-Platinum rating, version 1.0. It was recognized as one of the "greenest" buildings constructed in the U.S. in 2001 at the time it was built. Sustainability issues ranging from energy use to material selection were given serious consideration throughout design and construction of this facility.

The first LEED platinum-rated building outside the U.S. is the CII Sohrabji Godrej Green Business Centre (CII GBC) in Hyderabad, India, certified in 2003 under LEED version 2.0.

The Coastal Maine Botanical Gardens Bosarge Family Education Center, completed in 2011, achieved LEED Platinum certification and became known as "Maine's greenest building".

In October 2011 Apogee Stadium at the University of North Texas became the first newly built stadium in the country to achieve Platinum-level certification.

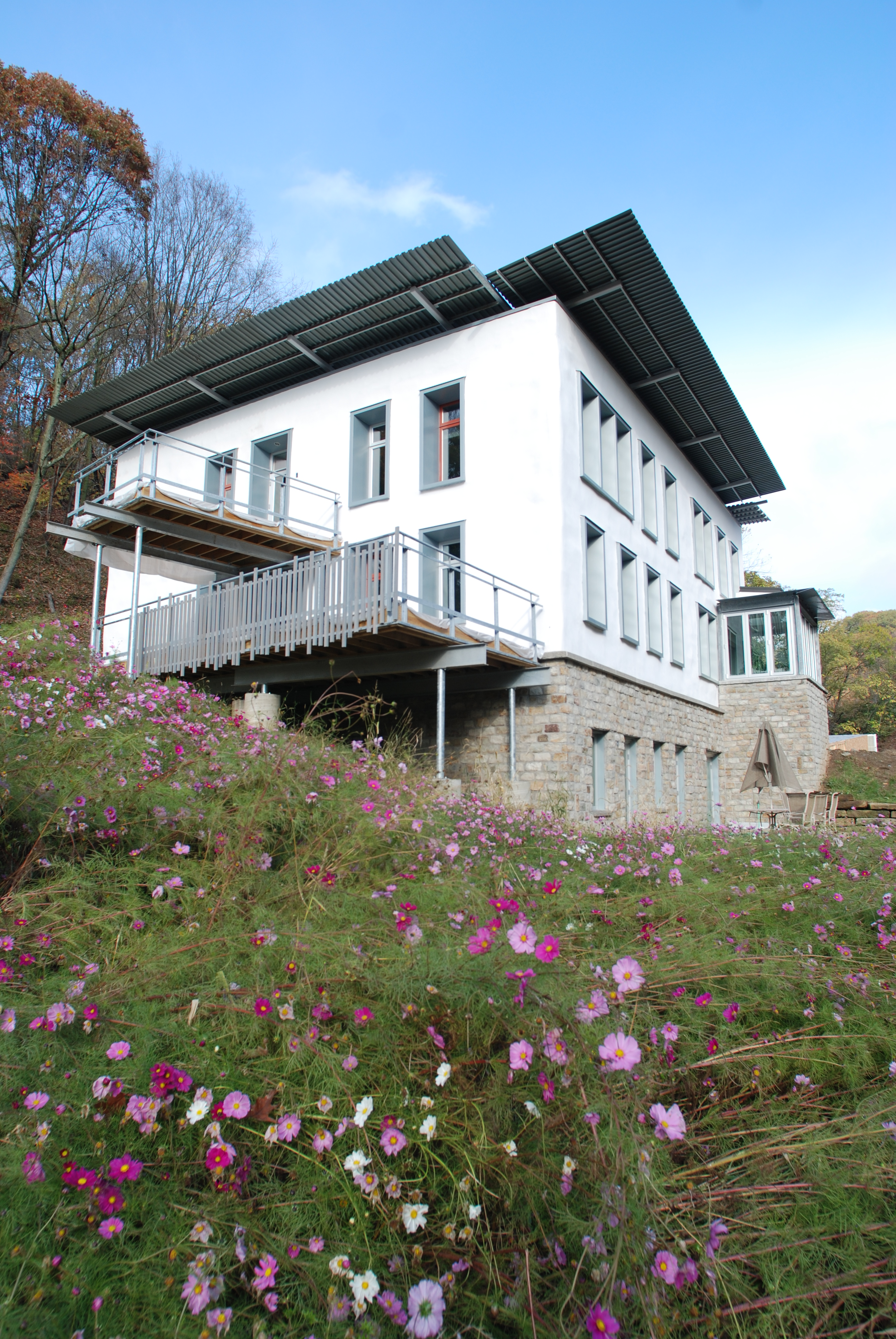
Sota Construction Corporate Headquarters in Pittsburgh earned LEED Platinum in 2012.

In Pittsburgh, Sota Construction Services' corporate headquarters earned a LEED Platinum rating in 2012 with one of the highest scores by percentage of total points earned in any LEED category, making it one of the top ten greenest buildings in the world. It featured a super-efficient thermal envelope using cob walls, a geothermal well, radiant heat flooring, a roof-mounted solar panel array, and daylighting features.

When it received LEED Platinum in 2012, Manitoba Hydro Place in downtown Winnipeg was the most energy-efficient office tower in North America and the only office tower in Canada with a Platinum rating. The office tower employs south-facing winter gardens to capture solar energy during the harsh Manitoba winters and uses glass extensively to maximize natural light.

=== Gold certification ===
Pittsburgh's 1,500,000-square-foot (140,000 m^{2}) David L. Lawrence Convention Center was the first Gold LEED-certified convention center and largest "green" building in the world when it opened in 2003. It earned Platinum certification in 2012, becoming the only convention center with certifications for both the original building and new construction.

The Cashman Equipment building in Henderson, Nevada became the first construction equipment dealership to receive LEED gold certification in 2009. The headquarters of the Caterpillar brand, it is the largest LEED industrial complex in Nevada.

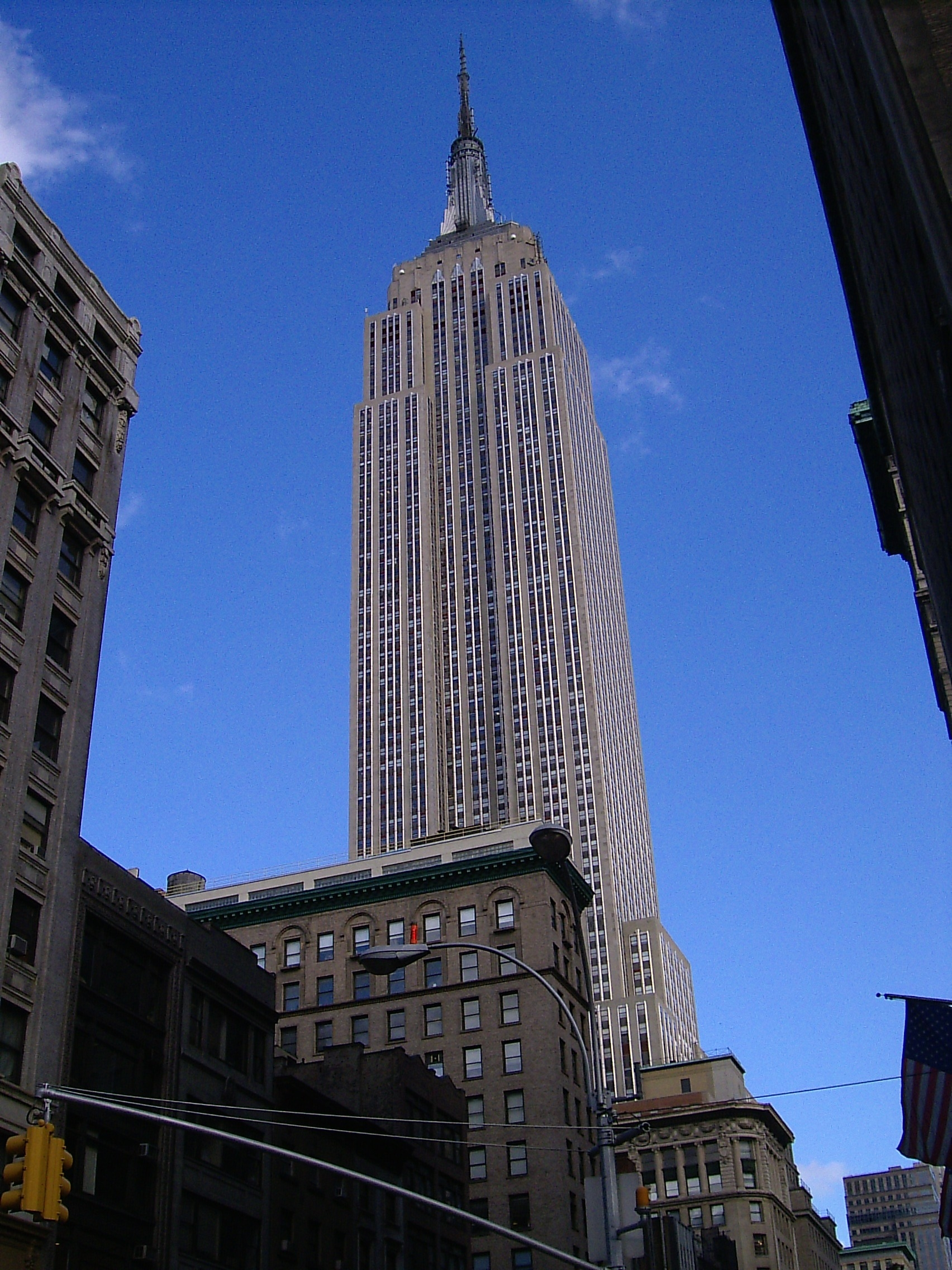
The Empire State Building in New York City is one of the tallest and most well-known LEED-certified buildings, certified as an LEED Gold existing building.

Around 2010, the Empire State Building underwent a $550 million renovation, including $120 million towards energy efficiency and eco-friendliness. It received a gold LEED rating in 2011, and at the time was the tallest LEED-certified building in the United States.

In July 2014, the San Francisco 49ers' Levi's Stadium became the first NFL venue to earn a LEED Gold certification. The Minnesota Vikings' U.S. Bank Stadium equaled this feat with a Gold certification in Building Design and Construction in 2017 as well as a Platinum certification in Operations and Maintenance in 2019, a first for any professional sports stadium.

In San Francisco's Presidio, the Letterman Digital Arts Center earned a Gold certification in 2013. It was built almost entirely from the recycled remains of the Letterman Army Hospital, which previously occupied the site.

Although originally constructed in 1973, Willis Tower a commercial office building located in Chicago, adopted and implemented a new set of sustainable practices in 2018, earning the property LEED Gold certification under the LEED for Existing Buildings: O&M™ rating system. This adoption earned Willis Tower the ranking of the tallest LEED-certified building in the United States.

=== Multiple certifications ===
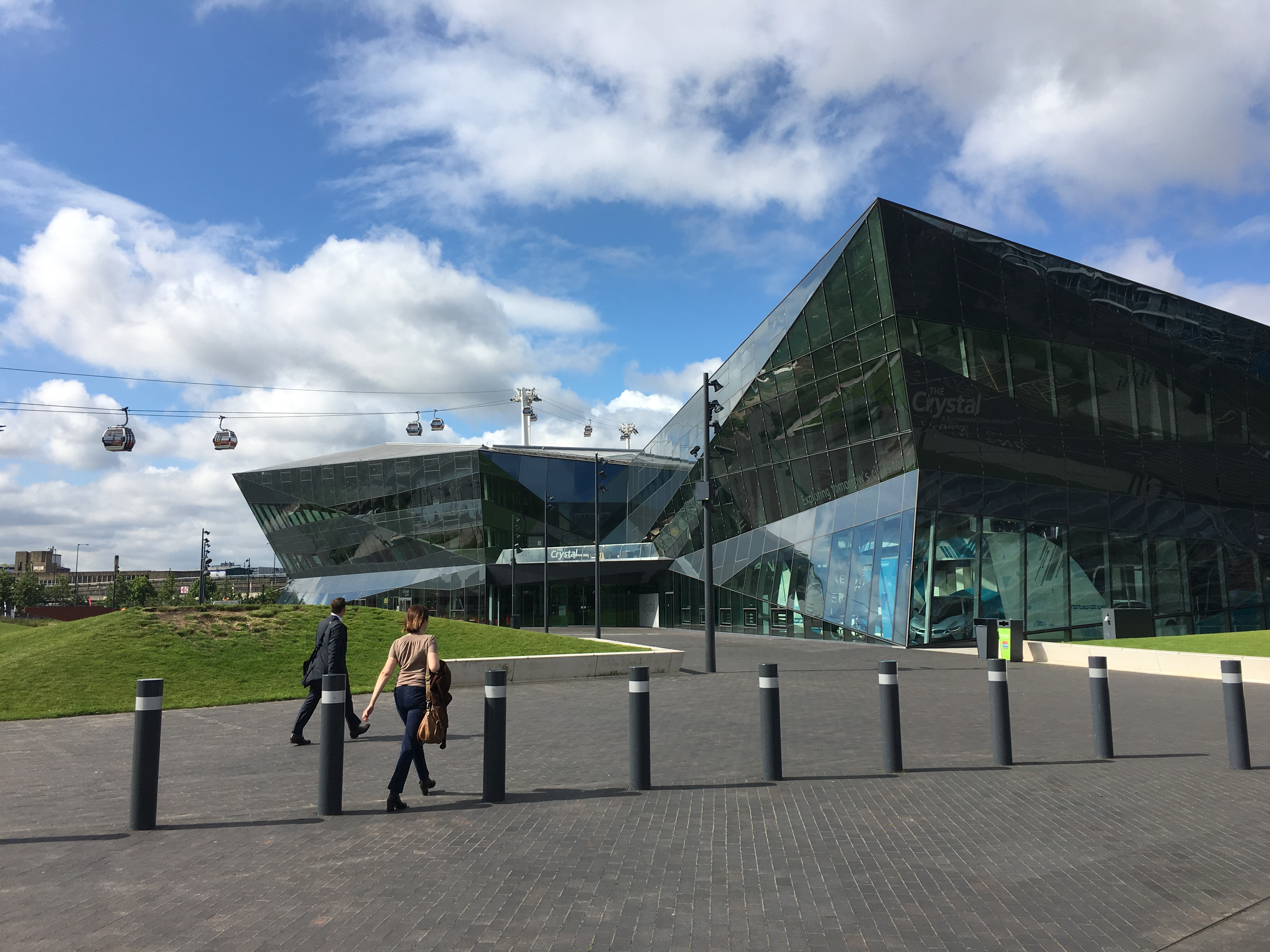
The Crystal, London

In September 2012, The Crystal in London became the world's first building awarded LEED Platinum and BREEAM Outstanding status. It generates its own energy using solar power and ground-source heat pumps and utilizes extensive KNX technologies to automate the building's environmental controls.

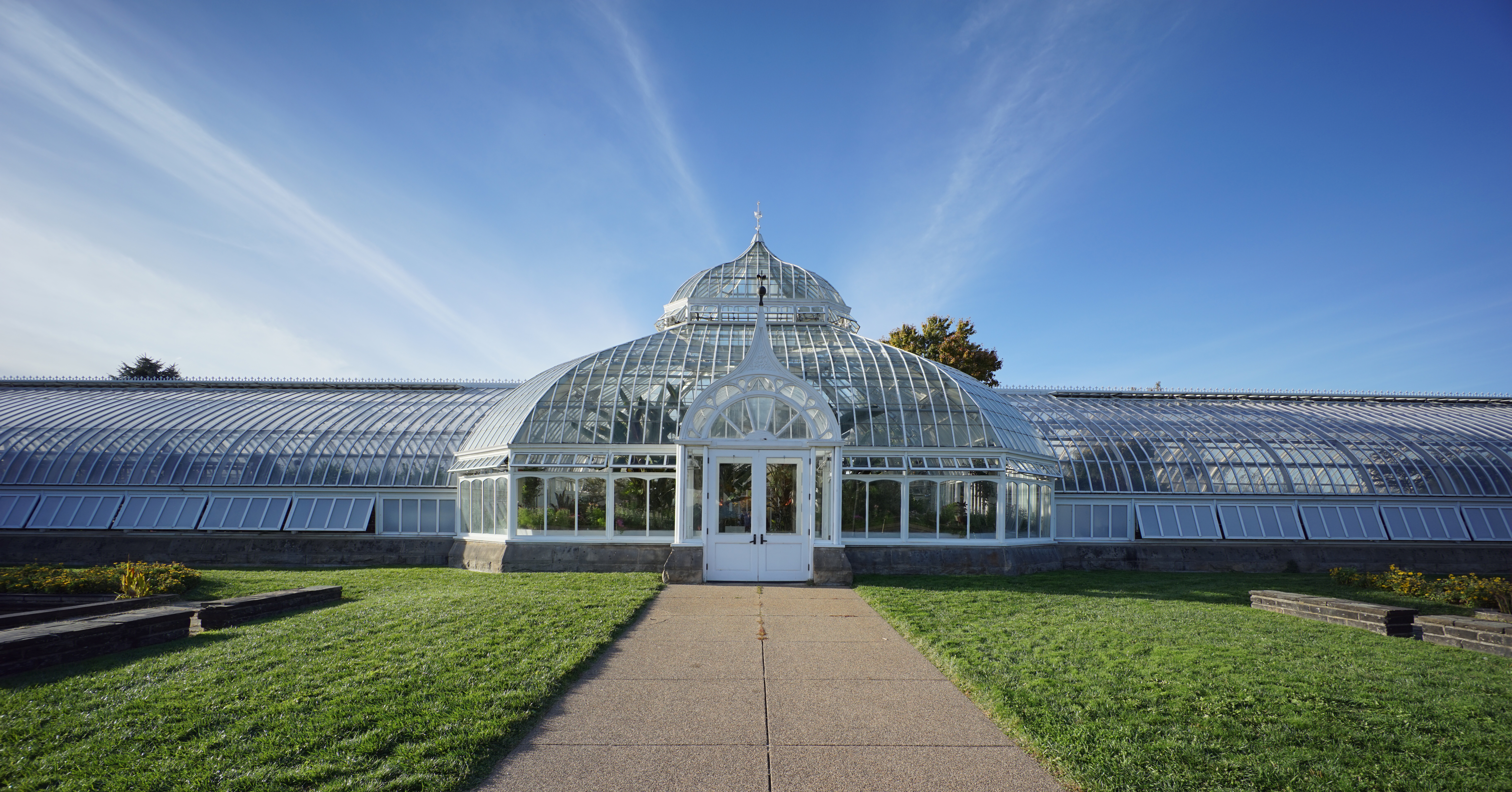
Phipps Conservatory, Pittsburgh

In Pittsburgh, the visitor center of Phipps Conservatory & Botanical Gardens received Silver certification, its Center for Sustainable Landscapes received a Platinum certification and fulfilled the Living Building Challenge for net-zero energy, and its greenhouse facility received Platinum certification. It may be the only greenhouse in the world to have achieved such a rating.

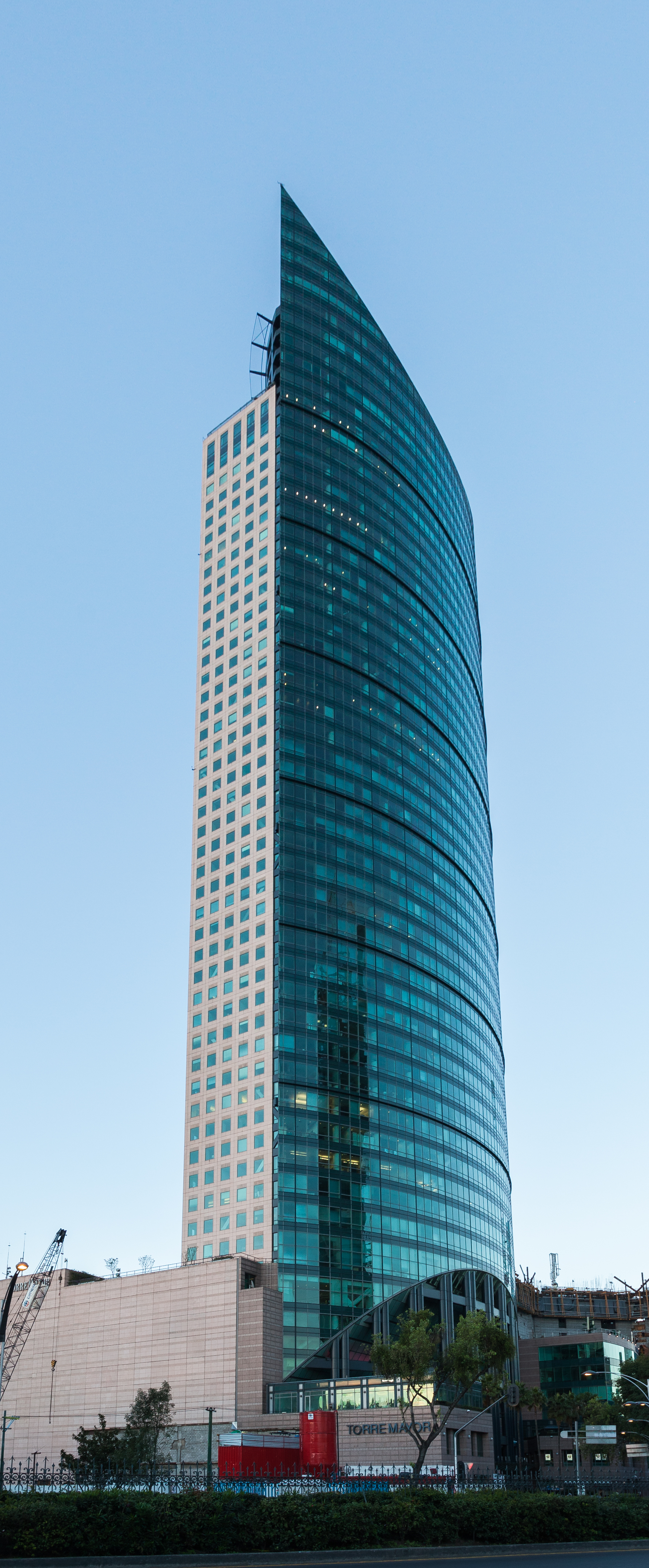
Torre Mayor, Mexico

Torre Mayor, at one time the tallest building in Mexico, achieved LEED Gold certification for an existing building and eventually reached Platinum certification under LEED v4.1. The building is designed to withstand 8.5-magnitude earthquakes, and has enhanced many of its systems including air handling and water treatment.

In 2017, Kaiser Permanente, the largest integrated health system in the United States, opened California's first LEED Platinum certified hospital, the Kaiser Permanente San Diego Medical Center. By 2020, Kaiser Permanente owned 40 LEED certified buildings. Its construction of LEED buildings was one of multiple initiatives that enabled Kaiser Permanente to report net-zero carbon emissions in 2020.

As of 2022, University of California, Irvine had 32 LEED-certified buildings across the campus. 21 were LEED Platinum certified, and 11 were LEED Gold.

=== Extreme structures ===
Extreme structures that have received LEED certification include: Amorepacific Headquarters in Seoul by David Chipperfield Architects; Project: Brave New World: SFMOMA by Snøhetta in San Francisco, California; Project: UFO in a Sequinned Dress: Centro Botín in Santander by Renzo Piano; Building Workshop in Zusammenarbeit with Luis Vidal + Architects, in Santander, Spain; and Project: Vertical factory: Office building in London by Allford Hall Monaghan Morris in London.

== See also ==
- Building enclosure commissioning
- BREEAM
- Center for the Built Environment
- Center for Environmental Innovation in Roofing
- Code for Sustainable Homes
- Design Impact Measures
- Ecological footprint
- Energy conservation
- Estidama
- Environmental design
- Green Globes
- High-Performance Green Buildings
- Home energy rating
- Living Building Challenge
- NAHBGreen
- Passive house
- QSAS
- Renewable energy
- SmartCode
- Sustainable architecture
- Sustainable refurbishment
- U.S. Green Building Council
- WELL Building Standard
