= Senator Perkins =

Senator Perkins may refer to:

== Members of the United States Senate ==
- Bishop W. Perkins (1841–1894), U.S. Senator from Kansas from 1892 to 1893
- George C. Perkins (1839–1923), U.S. Senator from California from 1893 to 1915
- Neptune Perkins, fictional U.S. Senator in the D.C. Comics universe

== United States state senate members ==
- Bill Perkins (politician) (1950–2023), New York State Senate
- Colonel Simon Perkins (1805–1887), Ohio State Senate
- Drew Perkins (born 1956), Wyoming State Senate
- Elias Perkins (1767–1845), Connecticut State Senate
- George B. Perkins (1874–1955), Iowa State Senate
- George D. Perkins (1840–1914), Iowa State Senate
- Ralph Perkins (Maine politician) (1888–1967), Maine State Senate
- Stephen W. Perkins (1809–after 1869), Texas State Senate
- Thomas Perkins (politician) (1931–2024), Maine State Senate
- Thomas Clap Perkins (1798–1870), Connecticut State Senate

== See also ==
- Rebecca Perkins Kwoka (born 1982), New Hampshire State Senate
