= Bosarge Family Education Center =

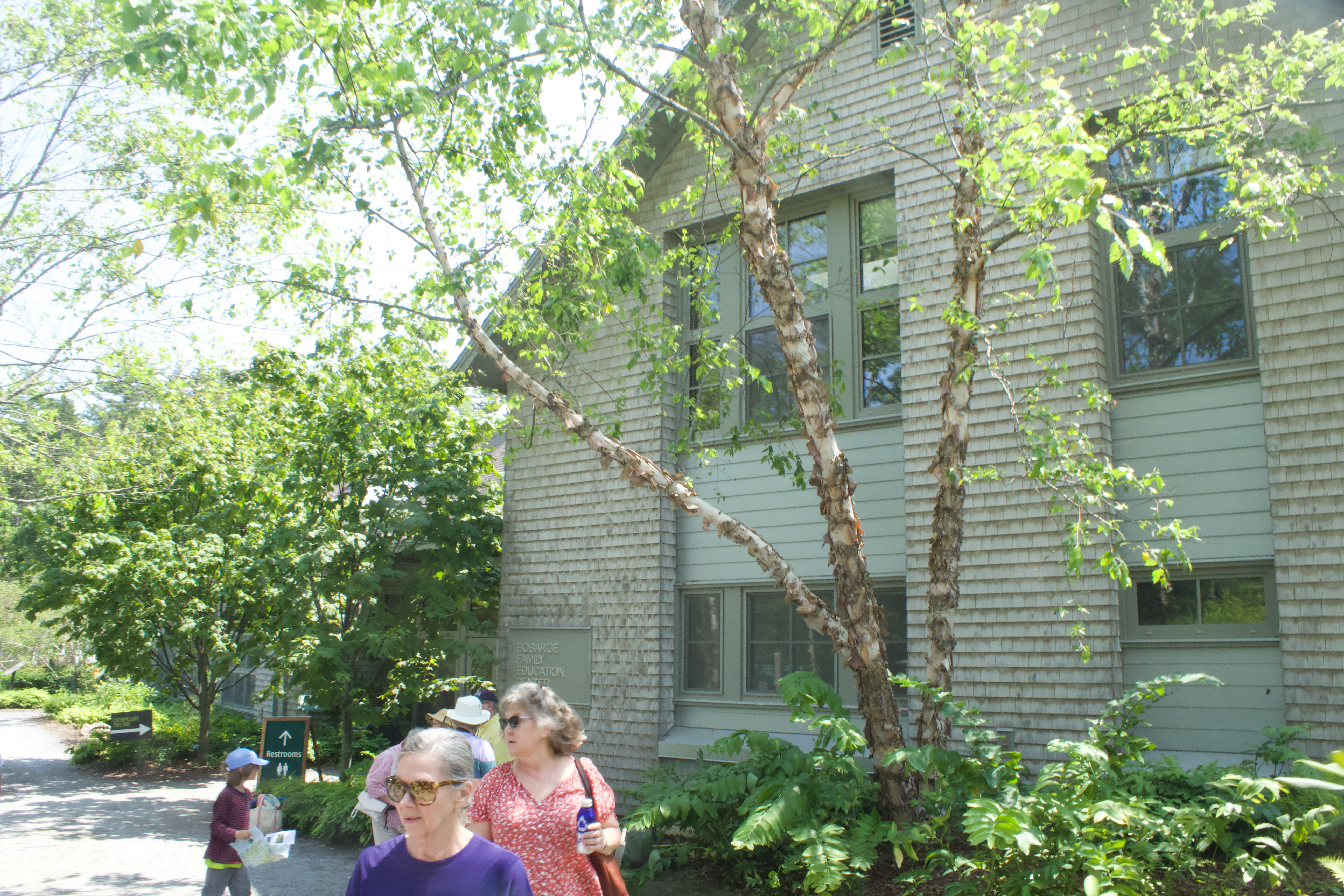

General information
- Location: Coastal Maine Botanical Gardens, Boothbay, Maine
- Coordinates: 43°52′26″N 69°39′41″W

Technical details
- Size: 8,200 sq ft

The Bosarge Family Education Center in Boothbay, Maine, United States is an 8,200-square-foot facility at the Coastal Maine Botanical Gardens built in 2011. It has attained LEED Platinum certification, the highest level that USGBC offers, and has become known as Maine's "greenest building." A 45 kW photovoltaic panel array provides 100% of the energy required to run the building. The Northeast Sustainable Energy Association's (NESEA) awarded it the 2013 Net Zero Energy Building Award. The building was designed by Scott Simons Architects of Portland, Maine and Mclay Architects of Waitsfield, Vermont.

The center is named after benefactors Marie and Ed Bosarge.

Energy usage can be tracked publicly online.

== Awards ==
- 2013 AIA Maine Institutional/Commercial Citation Award
- 2013 NESEA Zero Net Energy Award
- 2012 AIA Vermont Award for Design Excellence
