= Orono, Maine =

- Town
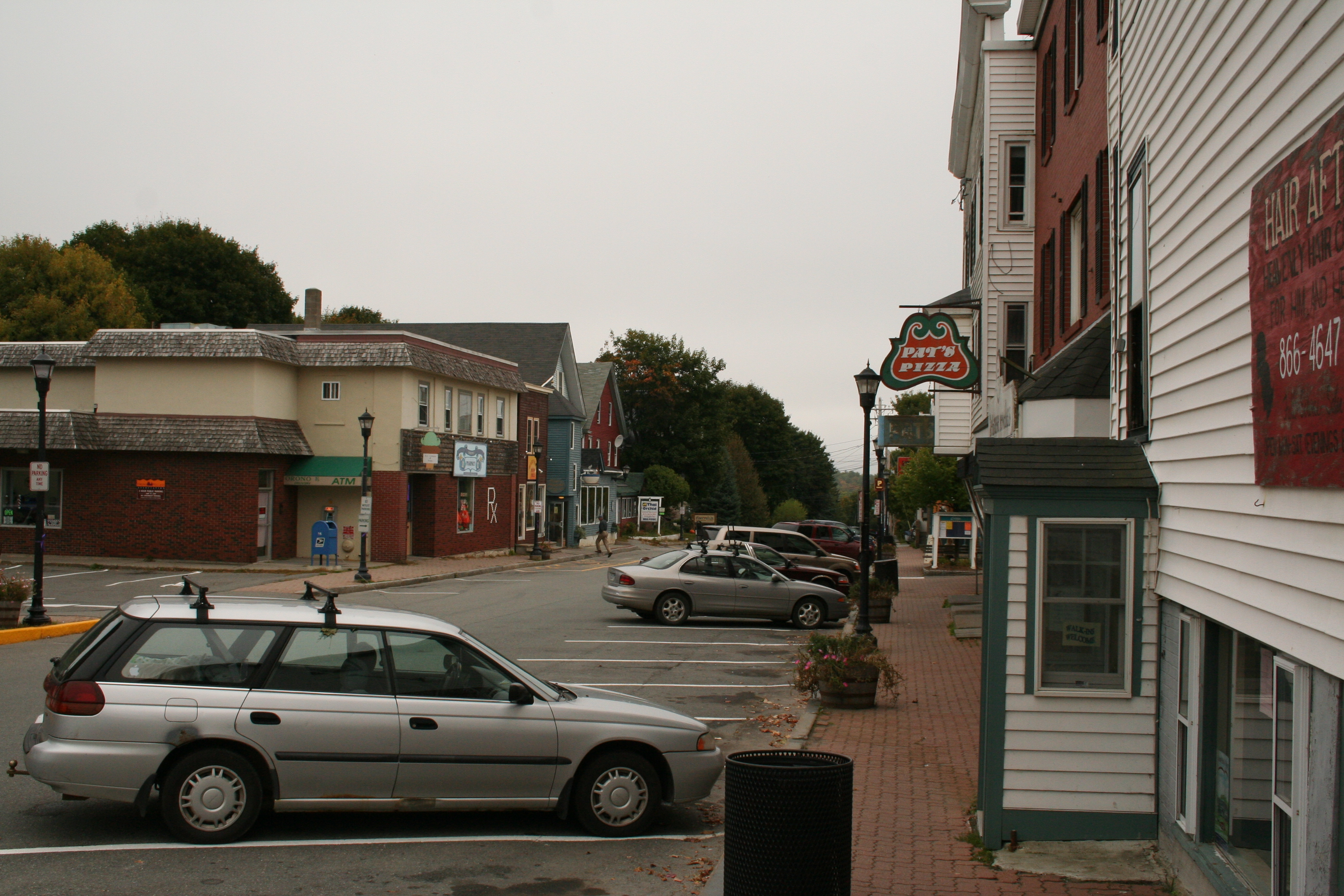
- Mill Street business in downtown Orono

- Seal
- Motto: "Home of the University of Maine"
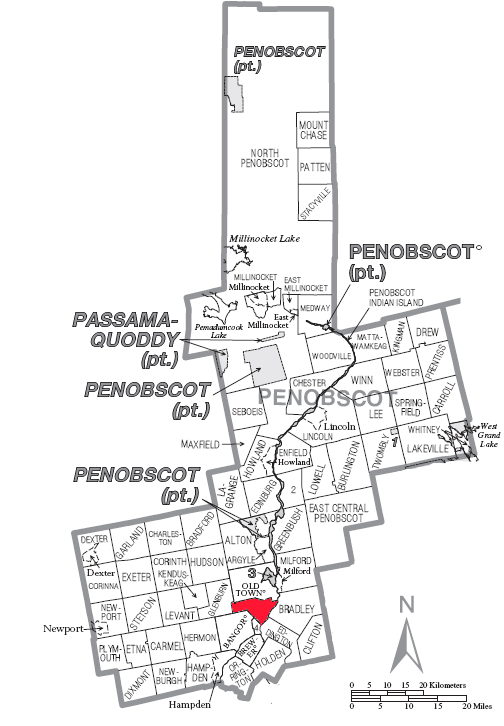

- Location within Maine Location within the United States
- Coordinates: 44°53′00″N 68°40′20″W
- Country: United States
- State: Maine
- County: Penobscot
- Settled: 1774
- Incorporated: March 12, 1806
- Chartered: 1969

Government
  - Type: Council/Manager

Area
  - Total: 19.60 sq mi (50.76 km^{2})
  - Land: 18.19 sq mi (47.11 km^{2})
  - Water: 1.41 sq mi (3.65 km^{2}) 7.19%
- Elevation: 249 ft (76 m)

Population (2020)
  - Total: 11,183
  - Density: 615/sq mi (237.4/km^{2})
- Time zone: UTC-5 (EST)
  - Summer (DST): UTC-4 (EDT)
- ZIP Codes: 04473-Town, 04469-UMaine
- Area code: 207
- GNIS feature ID: 582651
- Website: www.orono.org

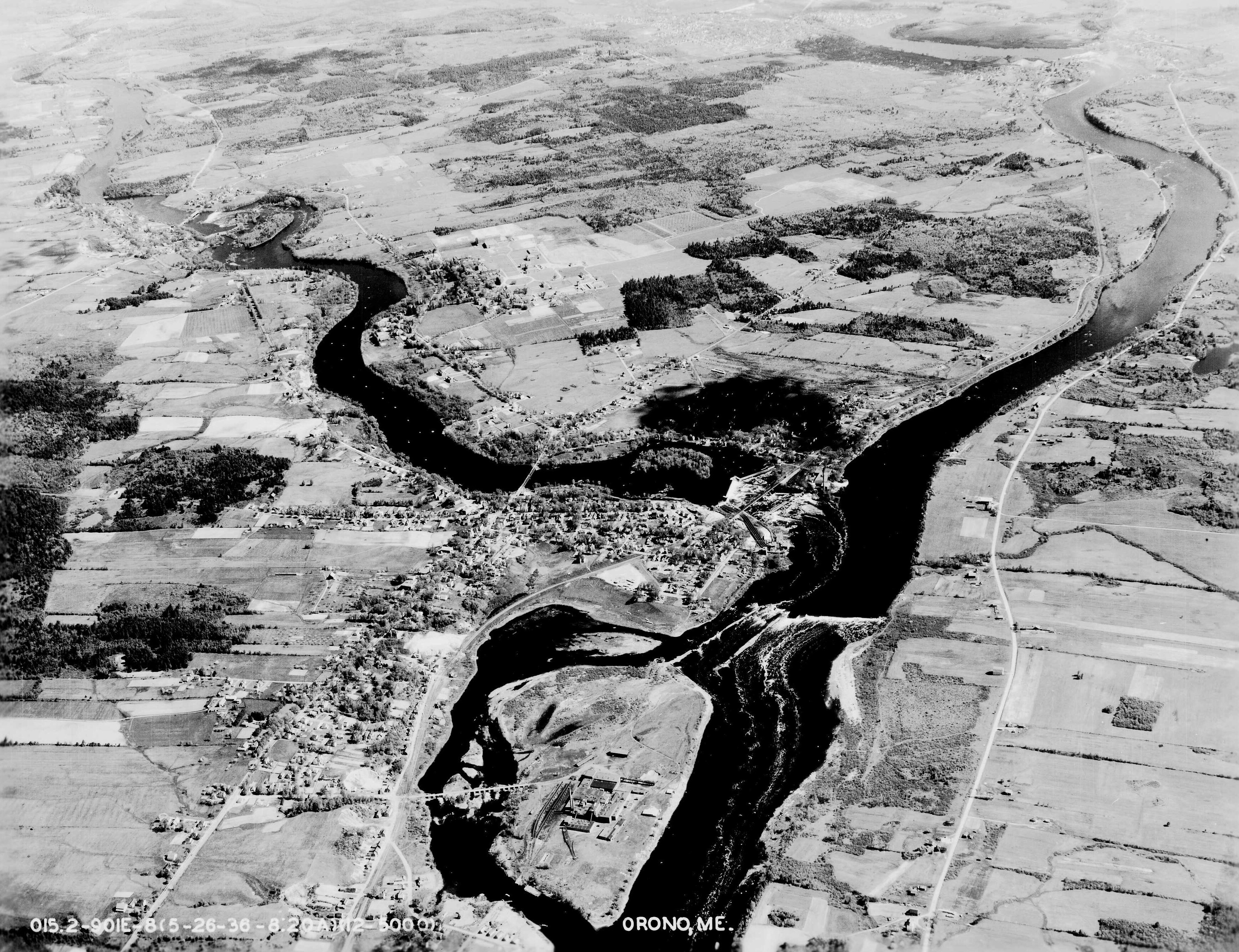
Orono in 1936, Ayers Island and the Basin Mills Complex are visible in the center front.

Orono (/ˈɒrənoʊ/ ORR-ə-noh) is a town in Penobscot County, Maine, United States. Located on the Penobscot and Stillwater rivers, it was first settled by American colonists in 1774. They named it in honor of Chief Joseph Orono, a sachem of the indigenous Penobscot nation who long occupied this territory.

In the 19th century, the town became a center of the lumber industry. Sawmills on the rivers were powered by the water, and logs were floated downriver on the Penobscot for shipping and export from coastal ports. Orono was home to a large pulp and paper mill. A defunct railroad spur extending from downtown to the Stillwater Community of Old Town is now the Stillwater River Trail. There has been a bridge over the Stillwater River since the 1830s; the current one was constructed in the early 1990s. Between 1895 and 1940 a trolley service ran through town including over the Stillwater River. A Penobscot River crossing ferry operated in the 19th century.

Since 1865, it has been the location of the University of Maine, established as a land-grant institution and the state's flagship educational institution. In the fall of 2018, the university enrolled 11,404 students at Orono. Not including university residents, the town's population was 11,183 at the 2020 census. It contains the census-designated place of the same name.

== Geography ==
According to the United States Census Bureau, the town has a total area of 19.60 square miles (50.76 km^{2}), of which 18.19 square miles (47.11 km^{2}) is land and 1.41 square miles (3.65 km^{2}) is water. The town is divided by the Stillwater River, a branch of the Penobscot River. It occupies the southern part of Marsh Island, surrounded by the Penobscot and the Stillwater rivers, where the University of Maine campus is located. Orono also occupies Ayers Island, the site of a demolished paper mill, Browns Island, a small protected natural area upstream of the Orono Dam, and part of Moose Island on Pushaw Lake. The remainder of the town is on the mainland. The Orono Dam impounds the Stillwater River at its confluence with the Penobscot River near downtown Orono. The seasonal Johnny Mack Brook flows through the town into the Penobscot River.

Orono is located along U.S. Route 2 (Route 15 in the now-obsolete New England road marking system). Orono marks the eastern terminus of Maine State Route 16, which intersects with U.S. Route 2 in Monument Square in downtown. Orono is located at milepost 145 of the Maine Central Railroad, the railroad bridge in town was built in 1885.

Orono shares land boundaries with Bangor, Veazie, Glenburn, and Old Town, and the Penobscot River forms the boundary with Bradley and Eddington to the east.

=== Climate ===
This climatic region is typified by large seasonal temperature differences, with warm to hot (and often humid) summers and cold (sometimes severely cold) winters. Orono has a warm-summer humid continental climate, according to the Köppen Climate Classification system is "Dfb", thus abbreviated ed in on climate maps.

Climate data for Orono (University of Maine), elevation: 47 m or 154 ft, 1981–2010 normals, extremes and average extremes 1893–2005 (Note: The 30-year period (normal) is for WRCC data only.)
Month	Jan	Feb	Mar	Apr	May	Jun	Jul	Aug	Sep	Oct	Nov	Dec	Year
Record high °F (°C)	65 (18)	63 (17)	83 (28)	89 (32)	99 (37)	100 (38)	102 (39)	104 (40)	97 (36)	90 (32)	78 (26)	64 (18)	104 (40)
Mean maximum °F (°C)	46.2 (7.9)	46.7 (8.2)	58.2 (14.6)	72.2 (22.3)	83.8 (28.8)	89.5 (31.9)	92.0 (33.3)	90.1 (32.3)	84.3 (29.1)	73.7 (23.2)	60.8 (16.0)	49.5 (9.7)	92.0 (33.3)
Mean daily maximum °F (°C)	28.7 (−1.8)	33.6 (0.9)	41.5 (5.3)	54.5 (12.5)	67.3 (19.6)	76.0 (24.4)	81.0 (27.2)	79.6 (26.4)	70.3 (21.3)	56.9 (13.8)	44.8 (7.1)	33.5 (0.8)	55.6 (13.1)
Daily mean °F (°C)	19.9 (−6.7)	24.2 (−4.3)	32.4 (0.2)	44.5 (6.9)	55.9 (13.3)	64.5 (18.1)	70.0 (21.1)	68.8 (20.4)	59.8 (15.4)	48.0 (8.9)	38.1 (3.4)	26.4 (−3.1)	46.0 (7.8)
Mean daily minimum °F (°C)	11.1 (−11.6)	14.8 (−9.6)	23.3 (−4.8)	34.5 (1.4)	44.4 (6.9)	53.0 (11.7)	59.0 (15.0)	57.9 (14.4)	49.3 (9.6)	39.2 (4.0)	31.4 (−0.3)	19.4 (−7.0)	36.4 (2.5)
Mean minimum °F (°C)	−14.8 (−26.0)	−12.9 (−24.9)	−1.18 (−18.43)	19.1 (−7.2)	29.1 (−1.6)	37.7 (3.2)	45.4 (7.4)	41.3 (5.2)	31.0 (−0.6)	23.0 (−5.0)	10.9 (−11.7)	−8 (−22)	−14.8 (−26.0)
Record low °F (°C)	−40 (−40)	−32 (−36)	−25 (−32)	3 (−16)	19 (−7)	29 (−2)	34 (1)	30 (−1)	22 (−6)	13 (−11)	−8 (−22)	−31 (−35)	−40 (−40)
Average precipitation inches (mm)	2.98 (76)	2.48 (63)	3.15 (80)	3.13 (80)	3.41 (87)	3.52 (89)	3.01 (76)	3.27 (83)	3.56 (90)	3.64 (92)	4.03 (102)	4.21 (107)	40.39 (1,025)
Average snowfall inches (cm)	18.7 (47.5)	17.8 (45.2)	11.3 (28.7)	3.9 (9.9)	0.2 (0.5)	0.0 (0.0)	0.0 (0.0)	0.0 (0.0)	0.0 (0.0)	0.4 (1)	4.6 (11.7)	14.9 (37.8)	71.8 (182.3)
Average precipitation days	10	8	9	9	10	10	9	9	9	9	10	9	111
Average snowy days	6.3	4.5	4.3	1.2	trace	0.0	0.0	0.0	0.0	0.1	1.4	4.6	22.4
Average relative humidity (%)	70	68	65	61	65	70	71	71	74	72	72	75	70
Mean daily sunshine hours	6.2	4.1	5.5	5.4	6.5	5.9	7.5	9.4	9.8	9.0	6.5	6.9	6.9
Source: WRCC, Weatherbase (snowfall, precipitation and snow days), Meteoblue (sun days) and timeanddate.com (humidity)

Climate data for Orono (University of Maine), elevation: 47 m or 154 ft, 1961–1990 normals and average extremes
Month	Jan	Feb	Mar	Apr	May	Jun	Jul	Aug	Sep	Oct	Nov	Dec	Year
Mean maximum °F (°C)	34.8 (1.6)	42.2 (5.7)	47.2 (8.4)	56.4 (13.6)	72.3 (22.4)	79.3 (26.3)	85.7 (29.8)	81.2 (27.3)	75.1 (23.9)	61.8 (16.6)	48.5 (9.2)	40.3 (4.6)	85.7 (29.8)
Mean daily maximum °F (°C)	27.0 (−2.8)	29.1 (−1.6)	38.8 (3.8)	50.7 (10.4)	64.2 (17.9)	73.6 (23.1)	79.2 (26.2)	76.3 (24.6)	66.4 (19.1)	54.9 (12.7)	41.9 (5.5)	30.4 (−0.9)	52.7 (11.5)
Daily mean °F (°C)	17.2 (−8.2)	19.2 (−7.1)	29.8 (−1.2)	40.8 (4.9)	52.3 (11.3)	61.7 (16.5)	67.5 (19.7)	64.9 (18.3)	55.8 (13.2)	45.3 (7.4)	34.7 (1.5)	21.9 (−5.6)	42.6 (5.9)
Mean daily minimum °F (°C)	7.5 (−13.6)	9.3 (−12.6)	20.8 (−6.2)	30.9 (−0.6)	40.6 (4.8)	49.6 (9.8)	55.6 (13.1)	53.8 (12.1)	45.0 (7.2)	36.0 (2.2)	27.5 (−2.5)	13.6 (−10.2)	32.5 (0.3)
Mean minimum °F (°C)	−1.5 (−18.6)	−0.4 (−18.0)	12.9 (−10.6)	27.2 (−2.7)	34.6 (1.4)	46.6 (8.1)	49.2 (9.6)	46.3 (7.9)	37.9 (3.3)	32.3 (0.2)	21.9 (−5.6)	−2.1 (−18.9)	−2.1 (−18.9)
Average precipitation inches (mm)	2.87 (72.9)	2.63 (66.8)	2.74 (69.6)	3.00 (76.2)	3.43 (87.1)	3.41 (86.6)	3.52 (89.4)	3.48 (88.4)	3.56 (90.4)	3.28 (83.3)	4.05 (102.9)	3.82 (97.0)	39.79 (1,010.6)
Source: NOAA and WRCC (average extremes)

== Conservation ==
The Orono Land Trust operates a number of protected areas in Orono. Piney Knoll Conservation Area, situated alongside the Penobscot River, is known for its walking trails and bird-watching. The University of Maine also owns a considerable amount of protected land in the town. Prominent parcels include Dwight B. Demeritt Forest.

== Demographics ==
Historical population
Census	Pop.	Note	%±
1810	351		—
1820	415		18.2%
1830	1,472		254.7%
1840	1,521		3.3%
1850	2,785		83.1%
1860	2,533		−9.0%
1870	2,888		14.0%
1880	2,245		−22.3%
1890	2,790		24.3%
1900	3,257		16.7%
1910	3,555		9.1%
1920	3,133		−11.9%
1930	3,338		6.5%
1940	3,702		10.9%
1950	7,504		102.7%
1960	8,341		11.2%
1970	9,989		19.8%
1980	10,578		5.9%
1990	10,573		0.0%
2000	9,112		−13.8%
2010	10,362		13.7%
2020	11,183		7.9%
U.S. Decennial Census

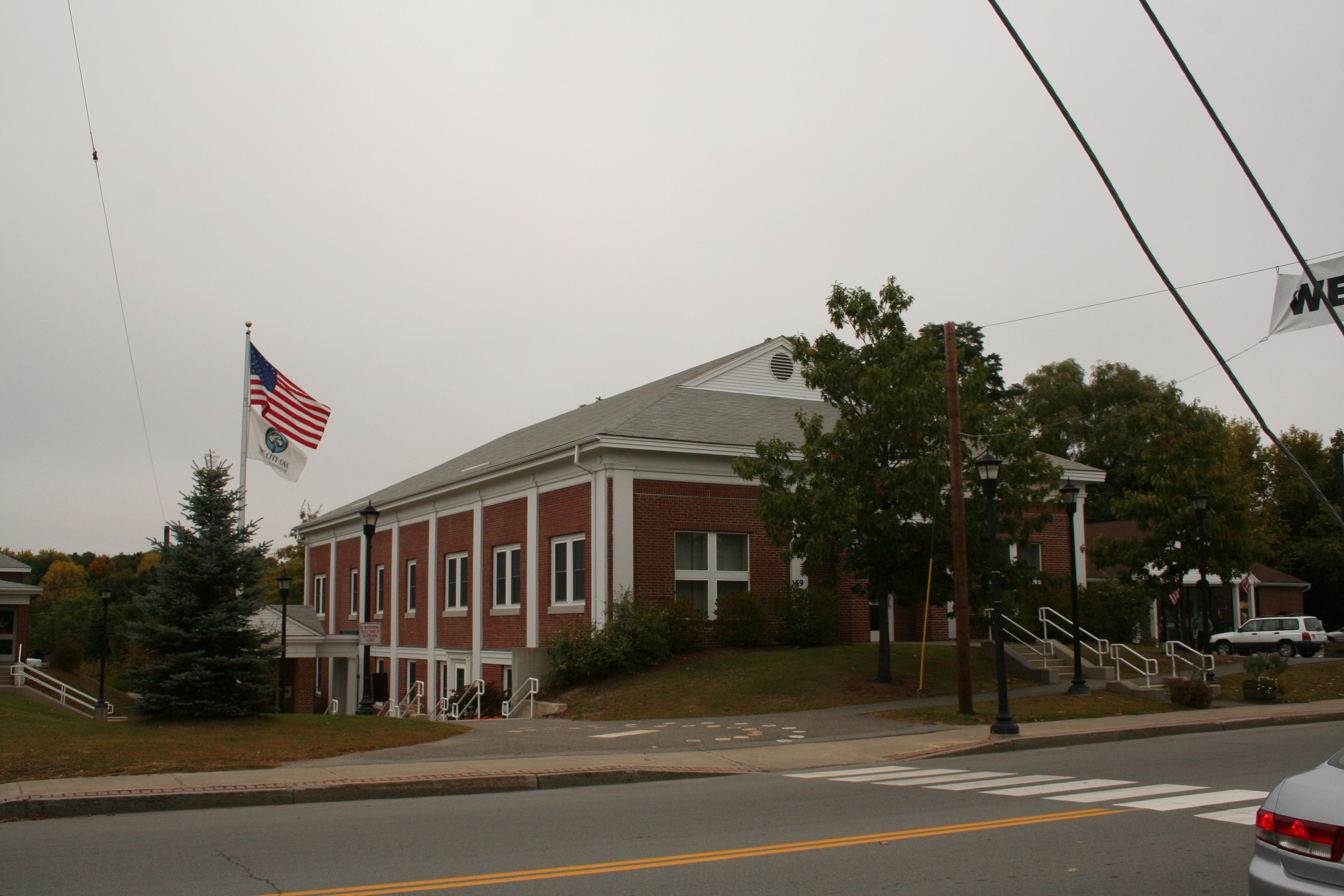
Orono town offices

=== 2010 census ===
As of the census of 2010, there were 10,363 people, 2,831 households, and 1,229 families living in the town. The population density was 569.7 inhabitants per square mile (220.0/km^{2}). There were 3,089 housing units at an average density of 169.8 units per square mile (65.6 units/km^{2}). The racial makeup of the town was 93.7% White, 1.2% African American, 1.1% Native American, 1.9% Asian, 0.4% from other races, and 1.7% from two or more races. Hispanic or Latino of any race were 1.5% of the population.

There were 2,831 households, of which 17.8% had children under the age of 18 living with them, 32.9% were married couples living together, 7.0% had a female householder with no husband present, 3.5% had a male householder with no wife present, and 56.6% were non-families. 30.6% of all households were made up of individuals, and 11.9% had someone living alone who was 65 years of age or older. The average household size was 2.29 and the average family size was 2.77.

The median age in the town was 21.8 years. 8.6% of residents were under the age of 18; 55.9% were between the ages of 18 and 24; 12.2% were from 25 to 44; 13.1% were from 45 to 64; and 10.4% were 65 years of age or older. The gender makeup of the town was 51.8% male and 48.2% female.

== Notable people ==
- Charles J. Dunn, Chief Justice of the Maine Supreme Judicial Court
- Wallace Rider Farrington, territorial governor of Hawaii
- Merritt Lyndon Fernald (1873–1950), botanist
- Constance Hunting, poet, publisher
- Frances Laughton Mace, poet
- Jonathan Norcross, inventor, 4th mayor of Atlanta
- Ralph Perkins, state legislator
- Elizabeth Schneider, state senator
- Joseph B. Treat, Wisconsin politician
- Nathaniel Treat, Maine politician
- Nathaniel B. Treat, Wisconsin politician
- Eva Valesh (1866–1956), labor journalist
- Israel Washburn Jr., US congressman and 29th governor of Maine
- George Henry Weeks, Quartermaster General of the United States Army
- Dorothy Clarke Wilson, novelist, playwright

== Points of interest ==
- University of Maine
- Fay Hyland Botanical Plantation
- Lyle E. Littlefield Ornamentals Trial Garden
- Old Fire Engine House
- Orono Main Street Historic District
- Pat's Pizza

== Education ==
It is in Regional School Unit 26. The district operates Orono High School, Orono Middle School, and Asa C. Adams Elementary School.

The University of Maine is in Orono.
