= Coastal Maine Botanical Gardens =

Botanical gardens in Boothbay, Maine, United States

Coordinates: 43°52.5′N 69°39.7′W

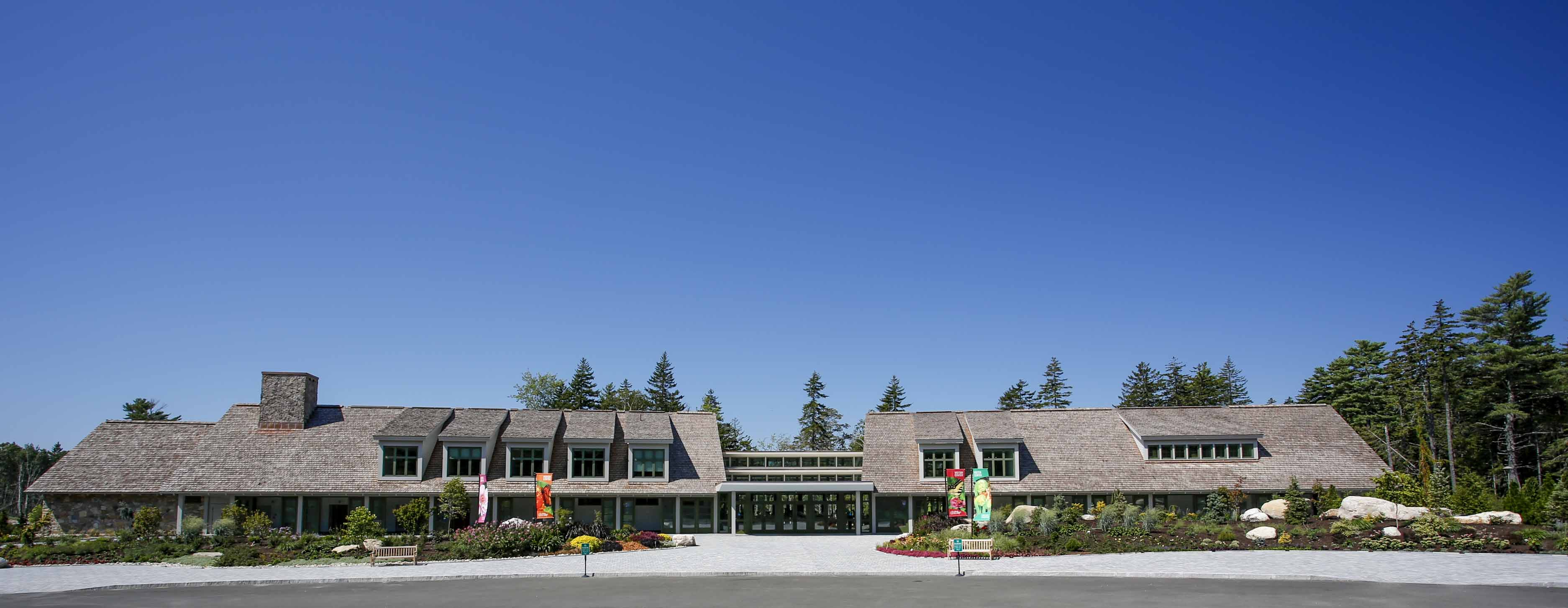
- The Gardens' visitor center opened during the 2018 season
- Interactive map of Coastal Maine Botanical Gardens
- Location: 105 Botanical Gardens Drive, Boothbay, Maine 04537
- Nearest town: Boothbay Harbor
- Area: 300+ acres
- Established: June 13, 2007 (19 years ago)
- Visitors: 200,000+
- Parking: Free, on-site
- Website: MaineGardens.org

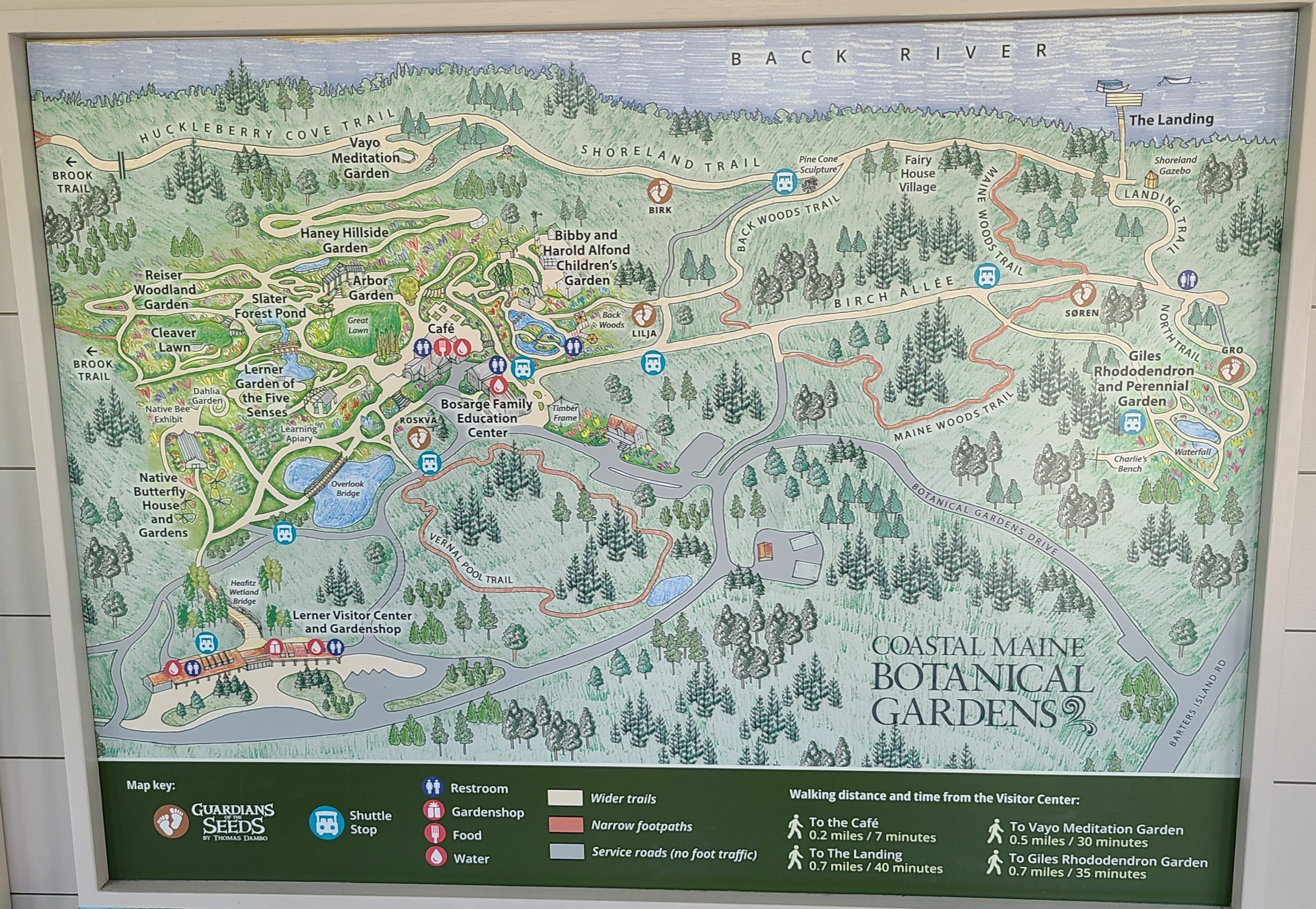
Map of the Coastal Maine Botanical Gardens, 2023

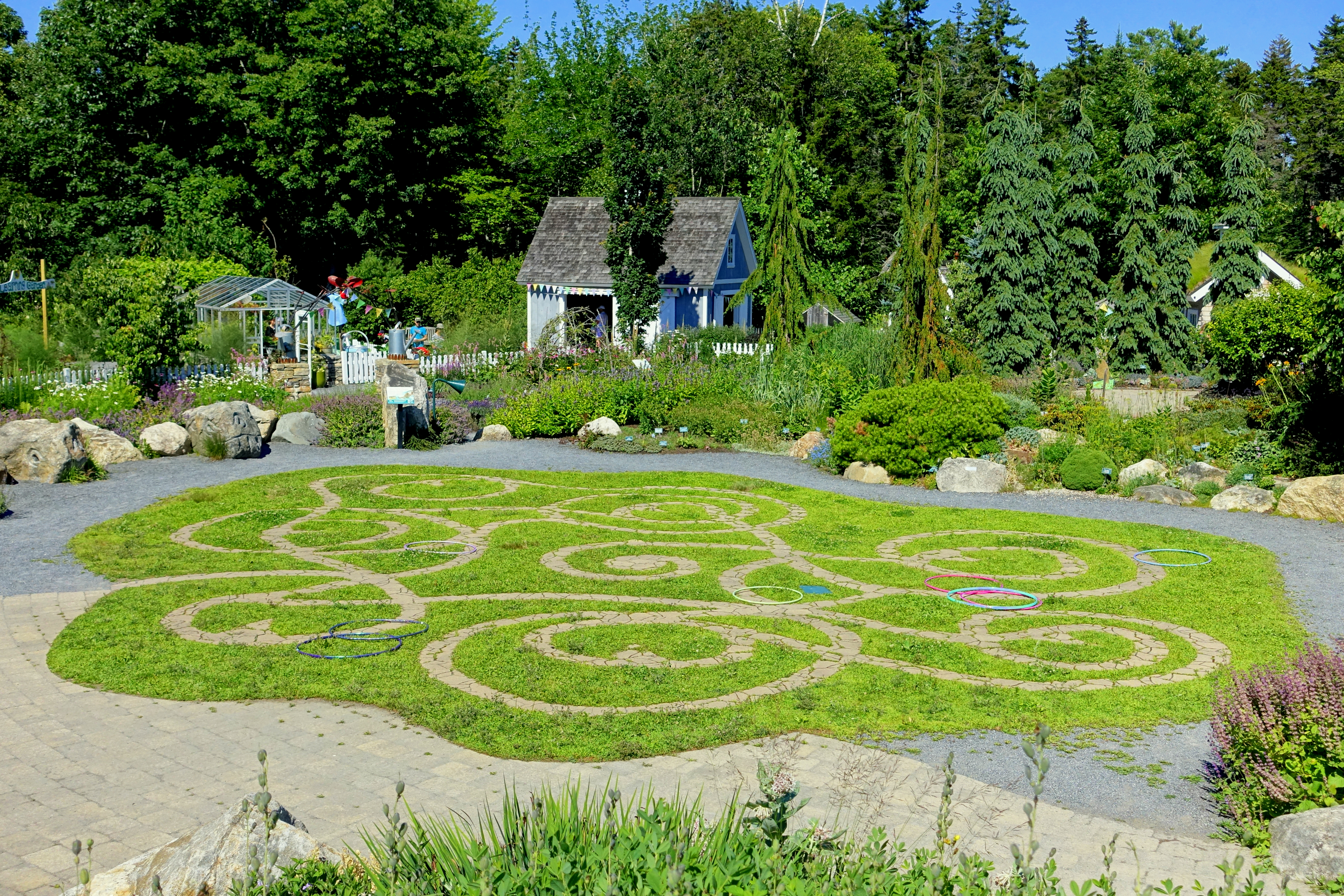
The Bibby and Harold Alfond Children's Garden at Coastal Maine Botanical Gardens.

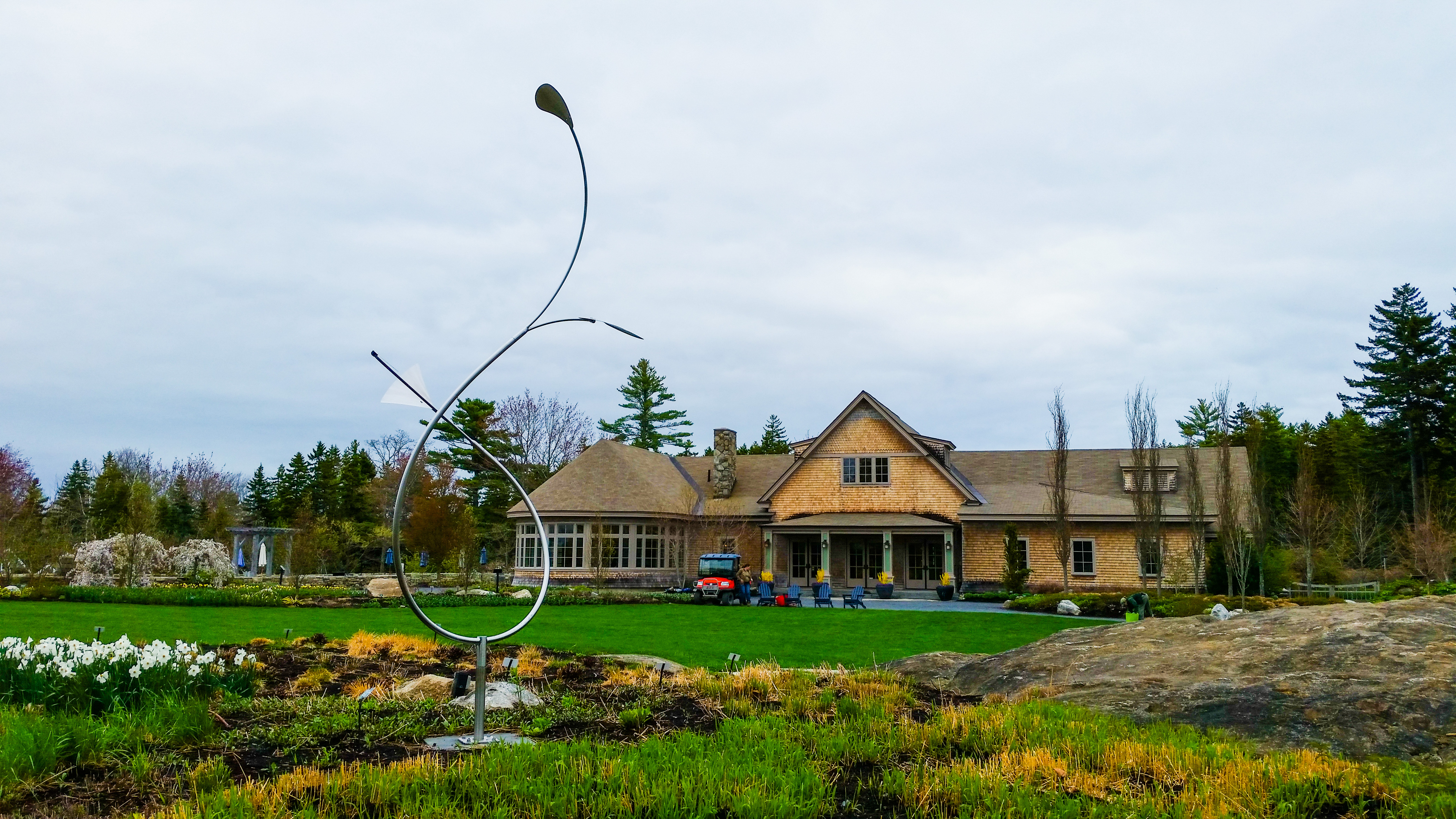
Coastal Maine Botanical Gardens, May 2015

Coastal Maine Botanical Gardens is a botanical garden in Boothbay, Maine. It was opened in 2007.

The gardens have been named one of Maine's top attractions. Its gardens and landscape include nearly a mile of tidewater shoreline.

After 16 years of planning, planting, and building, the Coastal Maine Botanical Gardens opened on June 13, 2007. This project began in 1991 when a group of Maine residents founded the grassroots organization. In 1996, after a thorough search for an appropriate site, Coastal Maine Botanical Gardens purchased 128 acres (52 ha) of land with 3,600 feet (1,100 m) of tidal shore frontage in Boothbay.

Today, as the largest botanical garden in New England, the gardens comprise 295 acres (119 ha), 17 of which are gardens featuring native plants of Maine and other plants suited to northern coastal conditions. Yearly, the gardens see on average 200,000 guests from throughout the United States and (in 2018) 63 foreign countries.

== Gardens and grounds ==
The Giles Rhododendron Garden is located a third of a mile from the central gardens and features more than a thousand rhododendrons and related shrubs as well as a spring bulb display. Garden designed by landscape architect Bruce John Riddell.

The Haney Hillside Garden opened in 2006, but the Patriot's Day Storm of 2007 brought down dozens of mature evergreens. The garden was completely renovated in 2010–11. Six thousand native plants were installed in the upper areas while the lower areas near the shoreline rely primarily on editing of the natural vegetation. Haney Hillside Garden was designed by landscape architect Bruce John Riddell and features three terraces linking 1,000 feet of switchback paths. A water terrace is followed by a moss terrace, and a final terrace featuring a glass orb by New York sculptor Henry Richardson.

The Lerner Garden of the Five Senses opened in 2009. Designed by landscape architect Herb Schaal, it's less than an acre in size with winding paths and changing elevation. The paths circle around and through five distinct regions designed to emphasize each of the senses. The garden also features several designs to facilitate its use by physically challenged guests, including brick paving with continuous striker stone bordering the path to help the visually impaired navigate the garden, while providing a smooth, hard surface and gentle slope for wheeled mobility aids.

In July 2010, the Bibby and Harold Alfond Children's Garden opened. It encompasses two acres of woods, ponds, and theme gardens inspired by well-known children's books by Maine authors, including Down to the Sea with Mr. Magee (Chris Van Dusen), Burt Dow, Deep-Water Man and Blueberries for Sal (Robert McCloskey), Charlotte’s Web (E.B. White), and The Stone Wall Dragon (Rochelle Draper), among others. Designed by landscape architect Herb Schall, the garden is divided into a series of separate spaces, each with its own identity and focus. Attractions include a learning garden, chicken coop, old-fashioned hand pump for water, a terrace planted with a rainbow of flowers, story barn, play cottage, small pond, treehouse, and maze lawn inspired by an English design. The area down the Back Woods, below the treehouse, where children will find a Bear Cave, an art table, a mud kitchen, and musical instruments inspires nature play.

July, 2011, the Bosarge Family Education Center opened – a LEED Platinum, net zero energy structure and was one of the greenest public buildings in Maine at the time it was built. This building was awarded the 2013 Zero Net Energy Building Award by the Northeast Sustainable Energy Association (NESEA). Thornton Tomasetti, the international engineering firm, served as the project's green building consultant. Designed by Maclay Architects of Waitsfield, Vermont, and Scott Simons Architects of Portland, Maine.

The Great Lawn was inspired by the nineteenth-century landscape parks. One of its most distinctive features is Whale Rock, a massive formation of Bucksport schist that rises out of the grass at the southern edge of the lawn. This area also features Founders Grove, a planting of seven narrow pin oaks, blueberries, and grasses commissioned to honor the founders of the Gardens. The Lawn, organically maintained, is for visitors to walk, play, and picnic on.

The Arbor Garden is an informal twist on formal rose gardens of European botanical gardens. The focal point of the garden is a large post-and-beam arbor made from Douglas fir. Climbing roses, native wisteria, clematis, ornamental grapes, and honeysuckle drape the structure in foliage and flowers. Vigorous, disease-resistant shrub roses suited to the cool, coastal climate surround the arbor.

The Vayo Meditation Garden is a meditative garden. A large basin carved by Plymouth, Maine, sculptor David Holmes from a soapstone-like rock called Ellsworth schist, is the focal point of the garden.

Cleaver Event Lawn & Garden was designed to help build a research collection of certain plants, including kousa dogwood (Benthamidia japonica) and dawn redwood (Metasequoia glyptostroboides ‘Ogon’). Adjacent is a smaller oval of turf featuring a fieldstone terrace bordering moss-covered outcrops. The woodland area to its north showcases a dozen species of native mosses and companion plants.

The Native Butterfly and Moth House opened June 1, 2018. The 2,160 square-foot hoop house features a planting scheme dedicated to supporting the entire life cycle of moths and butterflies native to Maine and New England.

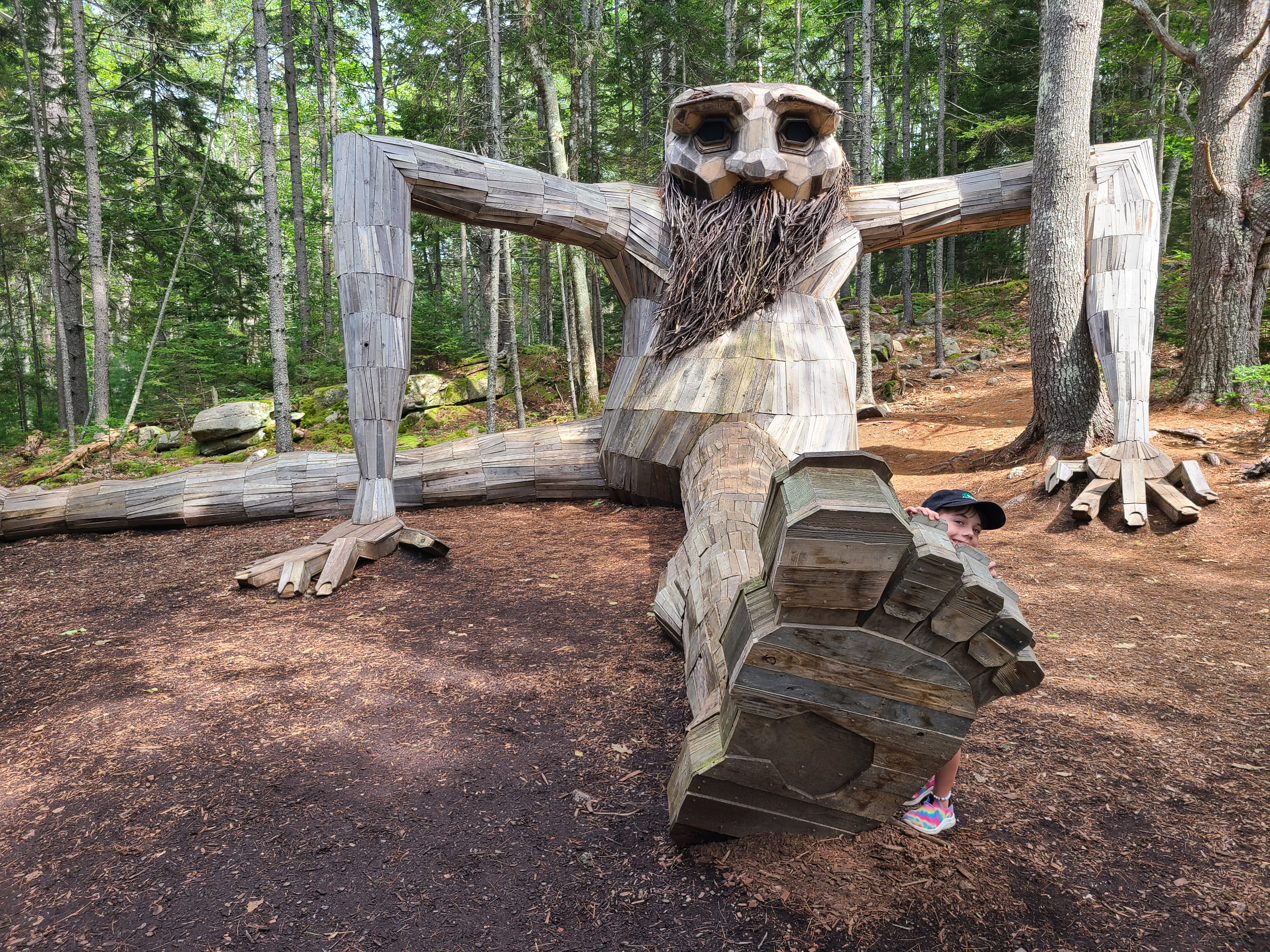
Birk, one of the five trolls found at the Coastal Maine Botanical Gardens

Slater Forest Pond was built in a naturally low-lying area well-suited to a small pond. The pond, excavated, lined, and replanted with native shrubs, trees, and pond plants in 2006, is filled with frogs and aquatic insects.

=== Notable exhibits ===
In 2021, Guardians of the Seeds, by Thomas Dambo, Danish "recycle art activist", opened to the public. It is the first Dambo exhibit to open in New England, and features five trolls with a theme of biodiversity and sustainability. Each troll has its own Danish name — Roskva, Birk, Gro, Lilja, Søren — and represents a different part of a tree. The tallest of the group is about 28 feet high. These trolls continue the story from Thomas Dambo's trolls around the world, from China to Puerto Rico.

== Expansion controversy ==
In February 2017, the Gardens were warned of violations found the previous month at the site during a $30-million expansion — plans for which were made public in April 2016. In July 2017, the State of Maine issued a formal Notice of Violation of four federal environmental laws: the Natural Resources Protection Act, the Erosion and Sedimentation Control Law, the Protection and Improvement of Waters Act and the Site Location of Development Act. On at least four occasions, a third-party inspector witnessed "instances of unclean water in protected wetlands and significant vernal pools", as well as "inadequate steps being taken to prevent erosion; and the unlicensed construction of a 'plunge pool' in a freshwater wetland area". By the end of June 2017, erosion-control measures were in place, and a restoration plan for a wetland area was in progress. The Department of Environmental Protection notice stated that sets of the contractor's construction plans for the project were never approved by the State. The constructor was Wright-Ryan Construction.

The expansion included a new visitor center with gift shop along with formal gardens and trails. Parking was also expanded, with the loss of a large number of white pine trees. To make the expansion possible, large areas of wetlands (including 6.2 acres (2.5 ha) of "critical terrestrial habitat of eight significant vernal pools") were permanently altered. Executive Director William Cullina clarified that, in some cases, "permanently altered" meant "improved". The Boothbay Region Water District and a neighboring family filed separate appeals of the project. The former dropped its opposition after the Gardens revised its plans to move its septic system.

== See also ==
- List of botanical gardens and arboretums in Maine
