= Dwight B. Demeritt Forest =

Protected area in Maine, United States

- Interactive map of Dwight B. Demeritt Forest
- Type: Forest
- Location: Old Town, Maine / Orono, Maine, United States
- Coordinates: 44.915°N 68.657°W
- Area: 1,478 acres (598 ha)
- Created: 1939
- Operator: University of Maine
- Visitors: 35,000 to 50,000

The Dwight B. Demeritt Forest is a protected area of Penobscot County, Maine owned by the University of Maine. It is located in the adjacent municipalities of Old Town and Orono, Maine. Totaling 1,478-acre (598 ha), the Forest is used for education, demonstrations, research, and recreation, including hiking and cross-country skiing. According to the New England Mountain Biking Association, 35,000 to 50,000 people visit the space each year. It contains over 15 miles of trails.

In 1939, forested land adjacent to the campus was leased by the university which was purchased by university outright in 1955. In 1971, the parcel was named for Dwight B. Demeritt, who, as head of the university's Forest Department, had helped procure the land.
