= Perkins Arboretum =

Plant collection in Maine, United States

Coordinates: 44°34′N 69°39′W

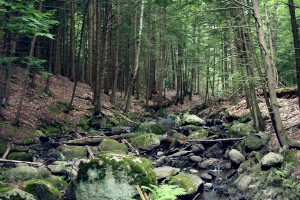
- Interactive map of Perkins Arboretum
- Website: Official website

The Perkins Arboretum (128 acres; 51.2 hectares) is the Colby College arboretum, located at 5600 Mayflower Hill Drive in Waterville, Maine, United States. It is used for teaching and research, but its trails are also open to the public.

The arboretum was established in 1946, and later dedicated to the memory of Professor and Mrs. Edward Henry Perkins; it expanded to its current size in 1969. The Colby Board of Trustees has mandated that the arboretum "be preserved and protected in its natural state without cutting or changes in the growth and natural habitat as time proceeds".

Arboretum trees include Apples, White Ash, Quaking Aspen, Gray Birch, Paper Birch, Yellow Birch, American Beech, Black Cherry, Dogwood, Eastern Hemlock, Hop-hornbeam, Red Maple, Sugar Maple, Northern Red Oak, White Oak, and Eastern White Pine. Other plants include Speckled Alder, Cattails, Sensitive Fern, Christmas Fern, Bracken, Clubmoss, Partridge Berry, Trillium, and Wintergreen.

== See also ==
- List of botanical gardens in the United States
