= Center for Environmental Innovation in Roofing =

American non-profit organization

Established	2008
Chairman	John Geary
President	Craig Silvertooth
Headquarters	Washington, D.C., USA
Homepage	roofingcenter.org

The Center for Environmental Innovation in Roofing is a nonprofit organization headquartered in Washington, D.C., focused on "the intersection between roofing, energy, and environmental performance".

== History ==
In February 2008, a group of industry leaders established the Center for Environmental Innovation in Roofing, a 501(c)(6) organization designed to promote the knowledge base, development, and use of environmentally responsible, high-performance roof systems. The Center was created with specific objectives:

- Serve as a repository for information pertaining to energy, the environment and roofing
- Coordinate and encourage objective research
- Serve as a research link between academia and industry, providing a forum for ongoing peer review of such research
- Safeguard jurisdiction to ensure new roofing products, systems and services remain within the sphere of the roofing industry
- Expand market opportunities
- Develop science-based advocacy on behalf of the industry
- Coordinate standards and codes, both in the U.S. and abroad

The Center commenced operations on March 4, 2008.

== Roof Point ==
Roof Point is a voluntary, consensus-based document developed by the Research Committee of the Center for Environmental Innovation in Roofing with input from roofing contractors, roof consultants, roofing material manufacturers, roofing research organizations, and other stakeholder groups. Roof Point is designed to evaluate both new and replacement roofs for commercial and institutional low-slope buildings. Much like the LEED building rating system does for the overall environmental impact of buildings, Roof Point offers a way to evaluate roof system environmental performance throughout a building's life cycle, providing a useful measure for what constitutes a sustainable roof in design, construction, operation, and decommissioning.

Roof Point is organized into five functional and weighted areas, representing the primary environmental contributions of modern roofing systems:

- Energy management
- Durability/Life cycle management
- Materials management
- Water management
- Environmental innovation in roofing

== Roof Point Excellence in Design Award ==
The Excellence in Design Award was established in 2003 by the National Roofing Contractors Association to recognize those who design long-lasting, energy-efficient, environmentally friendly roof systems according to accepted industry practices. In 2008, the Center took ownership of the Excellence in Design Award. The Award names an overall winner and category winners for best vegetated roof, the best solar roof, and best roof recycling. In 2011, the award was renamed the Roof Point Excellence in Design Award.

The Center named Nation's Roof, Lithia Springs, Georgia, the overall winner of its Excellence in Design Award competition during the International Roofing Expo 2009. The best vegetated roof was awarded to the William J. Clinton Presidential Library, built by Tremco, Inc. The best solar roof was awarded to the Fresh & Easy Warehouse in Riverside, California, built by Sika Sarnafil. The best roof recycling was awarded to Duke University Hospital.

== See also ==
- Environmental and Energy Study Institute
- Energy conservation
- Sustainability
