= Lyle E. Littlefield Ornamentals Trial Garden =

Gardens and research center at the University of Maine

Coordinates: 44°54′10″N 68°39′38″W

- Interactive map of Lyle E. Littlefield Ornamentals Trial Garden
- Website: Official website

The Lyle E. Littlefield Ornamentals Trial Garden (6.5 ha) is located on the University of Maine campus in Orono, Maine, United States. It consists of two parts: the Littlefield Garden, housing the permanent collection of woody and herbaceous ornamentals; and the Research Center dedicated to research. The Littlefield Garden is open to the public every day of the year.

Littlefield Garden was founded in the early 1960s by Lyle E. Littlefield, then Professor of Horticulture. Since then the Garden has collected over 2,500 woody and herbaceous plants, with special emphasis as follows: 210 crabapple varieties, 180 lilacs, 150 rhododendrons, and 35 magnolias.

The 15,000 square feet Roger Clapp Greenhouses are also located on the University of Maine campus. The greenhouses contain over 200 species of tropical and desert plant species from throughout the world.

== Gallery ==
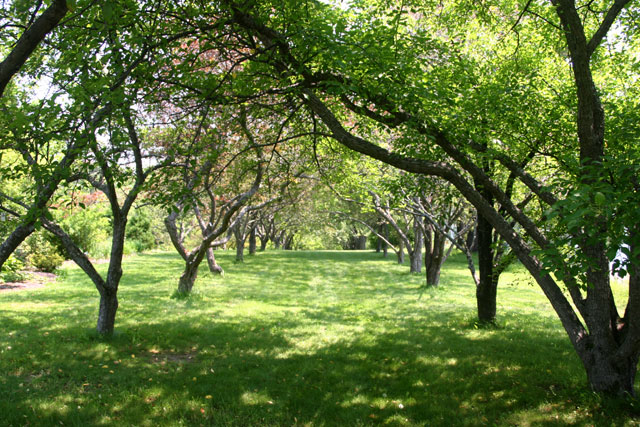

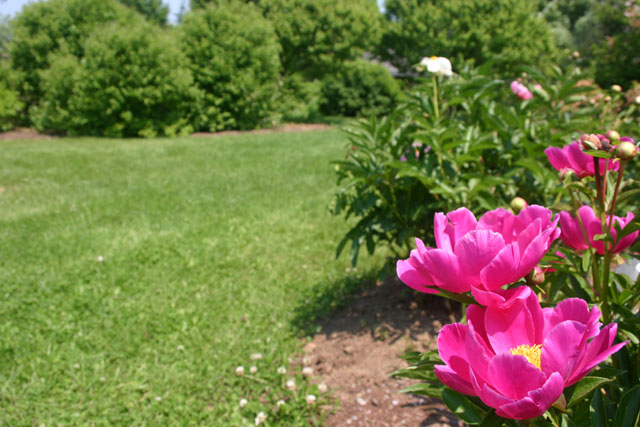

== See also ==
- List of botanical gardens in the United States
