= Partridge berry =

The name partridgeberry is commonly applied to a number of plant species including:

- Mitchella repens
- Gaultheria procumbens
- Vaccinium vitis-idaea (in Newfoundland and Labrador), better known as lingonberry
