= Ralph Perkins (Maine politician) =

American politician

Ralph Linwood Perkins Sr. (1888–1967) was an American farmer and politician from Maine. Perkins, a Republican, served in the Maine House of Representatives from 1919–20 and the Maine Senate from 1927-28.

In June 1928, Ku Klux Klan Grand Dragon DeForest H. Perkins of Portland resigned following the defeat of Klan-backed candidates Ralph Owen Brewster for U.S. Senate and John Smith for governor. Ralph Perkins (no relation) was mentioned as possible replacement as Grand Dragon.

In 1941, Perkins was a vocal proponent of the Townsend Plan.
