= Green building certification systems =

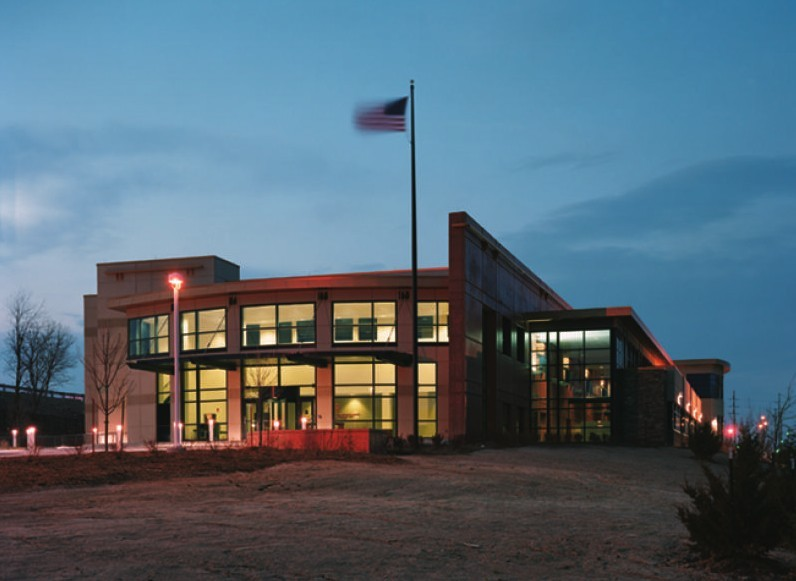
US EPA Kansas City Science & Technology Center. LEED Gold certified building

Green building certification systems are a set of rating systems and tools that are used to assess a building or a construction project's performance from a sustainability and environmental perspective. Such ratings aim to improve the overall quality of buildings and infrastructures, integrate a life cycle approach in its design and construction, and promote the fulfillment of the United Nations Sustainable Development Goals by the construction industry. Buildings that have been assessed and are deemed to meet a certain level of performance and quality, receive a certificate proving this achievement.

According to the Global Status Report 2017 published by United Nations Environment Programme (UNEP) in coordination with the International Energy Agency (IEA), buildings and construction activities together contribute to 36% of the global energy use and 39% of carbon dioxide (CO_{2}) emissions. Through certification, the associated environmental impacts during the lifecycle of buildings and other infrastructures (typically design, construction, operation and maintenance) could be better understood and mitigated. Currently, more than 100 building certifications systems exist around the world. The most popular building certification models today are BREEAM (UK), LEED (US), and DGNB (Germany).

== History ==
In the mid-1980s, environmental issues were in the news and public attention due to different international disasters such as the Bhopal disaster (1984), Chernobyl nuclear explosion (1986) and the Exxon Valdez tanker spill (1989). Lifecycle assessments (LCAs) were starting to gain traction from its initial stages in the 1970s to the 1980s and it was in 1991 that the term was first coined. With increasing cognizance of environmental impacts due to human activities, a more comprehensive assessment of buildings utilizing the principles of LCA was much sought after. In 1990, the first Sustainability Assessment Method for buildings, BREEAM was released. In 1993, Rick Fedrizzi, David Gottfried and Mike Italiano formed the world's first Green Building Council (GBC) with the U.S. Green Building Council. Their mission was to promote sustainability-focused practices in the building and construction industry and advance sustainable building principles. USGBC was further responsible for the creation of the Leadership in Energy and Environmental Design (LEED) green building rating system in 1998. The integration of energy usage, materials performance and other building-related environmental issues, along with an aim towards standardizing the comparison of assessments led to more comprehensive building assessment methods.

With the principles of green building gaining momentum, several more GBCs were established across the world. In 2002, the World Green Building Council was officially formed to bring all the GBCs under one roof. GBCs from Australia, Brazil, Canada, India, Japan, Mexico, Spain, and USA were the founding members. As of 2018–19, there are 69 Green Building Councils under the World Green Building Council organization.

== Goals and benefits of building certification ==
The goal of all certification rating systems is to provide tools and methods to assess the environmental and resource-efficient performance of a building. The main objectives of such tools are:

1. optimize building performance and minimize environmental impacts
2. provide a way to quantify a building's environmental effects
3. set standards and benchmarks to assess buildings objectively

Furthermore, the result of such an assessment is to provide a certificate verifying the achievement of the desired performance and quality of the building. Some benefits of certifying a building or a property include:

1. the negative impacts of a building on the environment can be better understood and this knowledge can be utilized to reduce such impacts.
2. holistic sustainability considerations will be made for the fulfillment of technical, economic, social and functional requirements of the building.
3. promotes sustainable design and construction principles throughout the building lifecycle.
4. increases the monetary value of a building or a property in the real estate market.

== Building certification systems used around the world ==
=== Germany ===
The German Sustainable Building Council (Deutsche Gesellschaft für nachhaltiges Bauen e.V., DGNB in German) introduced its own green building certification in 2009 together with the German Federal Ministry of Traffic, Construction and Urban Development (Bundesministerium für Verkehr, Bau und Stadtentwicklung in German). The DGNB certification is voluntary and is based on German codes and standards (DIN and VDI). It is generally regarded as more comprehensive than BREEAM and LEED. The DGNB System is based on the three main paradigms of:

1. Life-cycle assessment
2. Holistic sustainability (environment, economy and society)
3. Performance-based approach.

It also takes into consideration the economic aspects and as such, also assesses the associated Life Cycle Costs and Value Creation of the building. It has six assessment categories and further assigns different weights to each category indicator.

DGNB assessment categories and Weightages
Category	Weightage in %
Ecological quality	22.5
Economical quality	22.5
Sociocultural and functional quality	22.5
Technical quality	22.5
Process quality	10
Site quality	(Separate assessment)

The assessment is done by an auditor who is appointed by the project contractor. The auditor supports the contractor and supervises the construction process from the initial registration up to the certification and the project conclusion.

DGNB rating levels and percentage scores
Rating level	Percentage score
Platinum	≥80%
Gold	≥65%
Silver	≥50%
Bronze	≥35% (only for existing buildings)

=== New Zealand ===
The New Zealand Green Building Council promulgates a Homestar standard.

=== Sweden ===
The Sweden Green Building Council introduced its own certification system in 2011 with Miljöbyggnad which is based on Swedish standards and legislations. It is currently in its 3rd iteration with Miljöbyggnad 3.1 released in April 2020. Miljöbyggnad has three levels of certification: Bronze, Silver and Gold. It is used to certify both new and existing constructions. It assesses 3 categories, namely:

1. Energy consumption
2. Indoor environment
3. Materials and chemicals.

Among these categories, there are 15 further sub-categories which have its own set of requirements for each certification levels. For example, for the "Energy use" sub-category, Bronze level requires energy use to be less than 65% of the requirements of the BBR, the Swedish Building Code. After 3 years, another follow-up inspection is conducted to see that everything is in the correct order and the standards are still being met.

Besides Miljöbyggnad, the Sweden Green Building Council also administers the Swedish version of the British BREEAM adapted for the Swedish construction practices and standards, called BREEAM-SE. It was first introduced in Sweden in 2013 and is used to certify new constructions.

=== Taiwan ===
EEWH is Taiwan's Green Building Label. EEWH is the abbreviation of "Ecology, Energy Saving, Waste Reduction, and Health" and is established in 1999 as the fourth green building label certification in the world. It is currently the only green building evaluation system independently developed in tropical and subtropical climates, and most especially for high-temperature and high-humidity climates. Apart from operating in Taiwan, there is also an international version of the EEWH certification for buildings abroad.

There are six types of EEWH, which are divided into "basic type, accommodation type, factory building type, old building improvement type, community type, and overseas version". Each type is based on the four major axes of "ecology, energy saving, waste reduction, and health". According to the standards of the nine indicators of "biodiversity, greening amount, base water conservation, daily energy saving, carbon dioxide reduction, waste reduction, indoor environment, water resources, sewage and waste improvement", to determine the "qualified grade, bronze grade, silver grade Level, Gold Level, Diamond Level" five certification levels, generally audit rewards if qualified level can get 2% volume, bronze level 4%, silver level 6%, gold level 8%, diamond level 10%.

=== United Kingdom ===
The Building Research Establishment Environmental Assessment Method (BREEAM) is recognized as the first Sustainability Assessment Method for buildings. It was launched in 1990 by the UK-based organization Building Research Establishment (BRE).

BREEAM logo

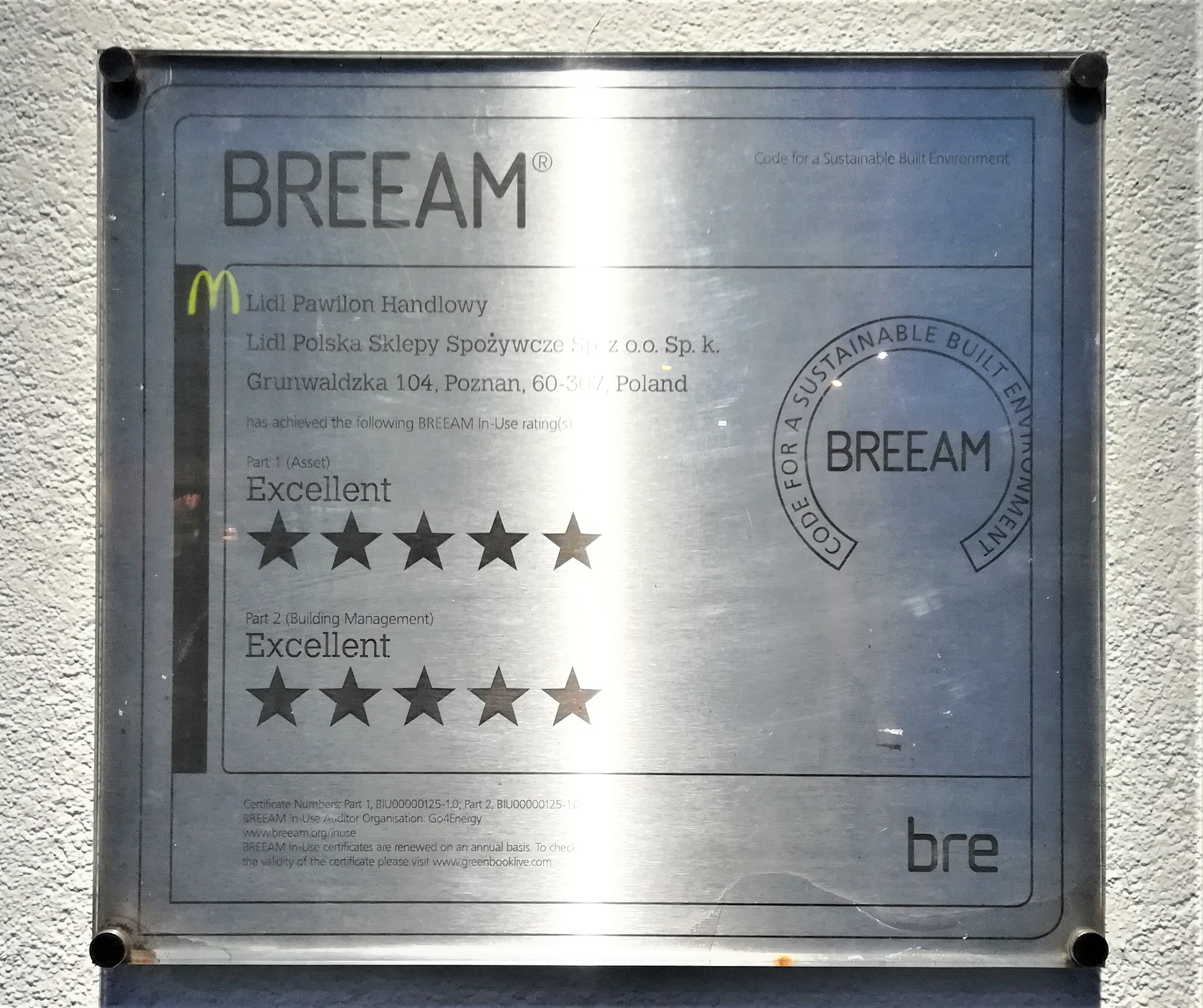
A BREEAM certification plaque in Poznan, Poland

BREEAM certification is carried out on the basis of a scoring system where projects are assessed on the basis of 10 categories (with individual weightings differing by project type) as follows:

1. Management
2. Health and well-being
3. Hazards
4. Energy
5. Transport
6. Water
7. Materials
8. Waste
9. Land use and ecology
10. Pollution
11. Surface water run-off

Each category is sub-divided into a range of assessment indicators, each having its own aim, target and benchmarks. When a target or benchmark is reached, the asset is given credits (or points) by a qualified BREEAM assessor. The category score is calculated according to the number of credits attained and the category weightings. Once the development has been fully assessed, the final performance rating is determined by the sum of the weighted category scores. The final performance rating is specified as:

BREEAM rating levels and percentage scores
Rating Level	Percentage score
Outstanding	≥85%
Excellent	≥70%
Very Good	≥55%
Good	≥45%
Pass	≥30%
Unclassified	<30%

A qualified assessor evaluates a building or project and ensures that it meets the quality and performance standards of the selected scheme. In some countries such as Netherlands, Germany and Sweden, there are national operators that officially certify for BREEAM adapted to that country's standards, processes and construction methods.

BREEAM certification has also been made mandatory for governmental construction projects in the UK. According to the Common Minimum Standards for governmental construction, an environmental assessment is required on all public projects and further states that, "where BREEAM is used, all new projects are to achieve an 'excellent' rating and all refurbishment projects are to achieve at least 'very good' rating."

=== United States ===
In 1998, the US Green Building Council devised its own building certification system through the Leadership in Energy and Environmental Design (LEED) certification. It has its own set of criteria for assessment and utilizes the ASHRAE codes and standards. Due to its simplicity and ease-of-use, the LEED quickly gained international recognition within a short period. Over the years, LEED has undergone many changes and is now currently in its fourth iteration, which was launched in late 2013.

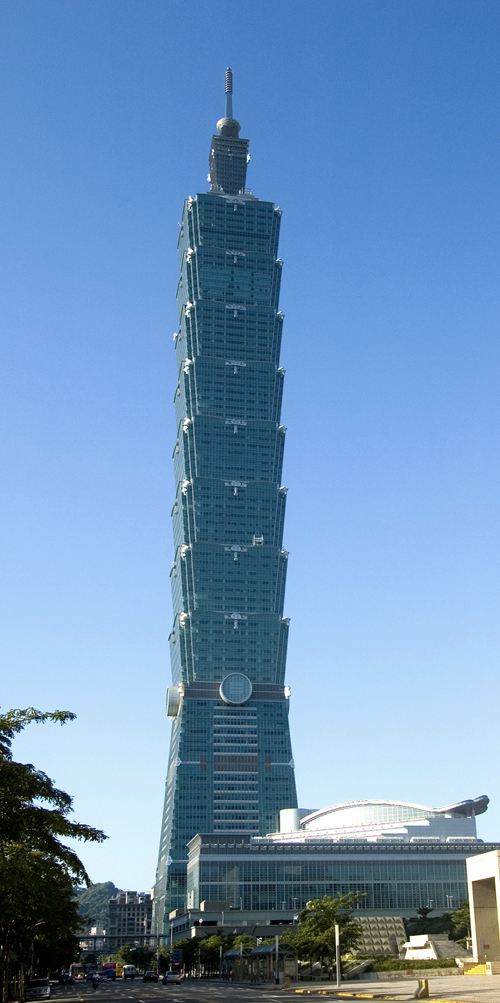
Taipei 101, the tallest and largest LEED Platinum certified building in the world since 2011.

LEED rating systems differ according to the type of the project. The different types of rating systems fall under:

1. Building Design and Construction: For new construction or major renovations
2. Interior Design and Construction: For commercial interior fit-out projects
3. Building Operations and Maintenance: For existing buildings undergoing improvement but with little construction work
4. Neighborhood Development: For new land development projects or redevelopment projects
5. Homes: For single family, low-rise multi-family or mid-rise multi-family homes
6. Cities and Communities: For entire cities or sub-sections of a city. Assessment of a city's water consumption, energy use, waste, transportation etc.
7. LEED Recertification: For occupied and currently-in-use projects that have already received LEED certification but aiming to maintain and improve the building.
8. LEED Zero: For projects with net-zero goals in carbon emissions and resource use.

LEED certification is voluntary and a qualified assessor evaluates the projects on the basis of various established categories. These categories are as follows:

1. Integrative process
2. Location and transportation
3. Sustainable sites
4. Water efficiency
5. Energy and atmosphere
6. Materials and resources
7. Indoor environmental quality
8. Innovation in design
9. Regional priority

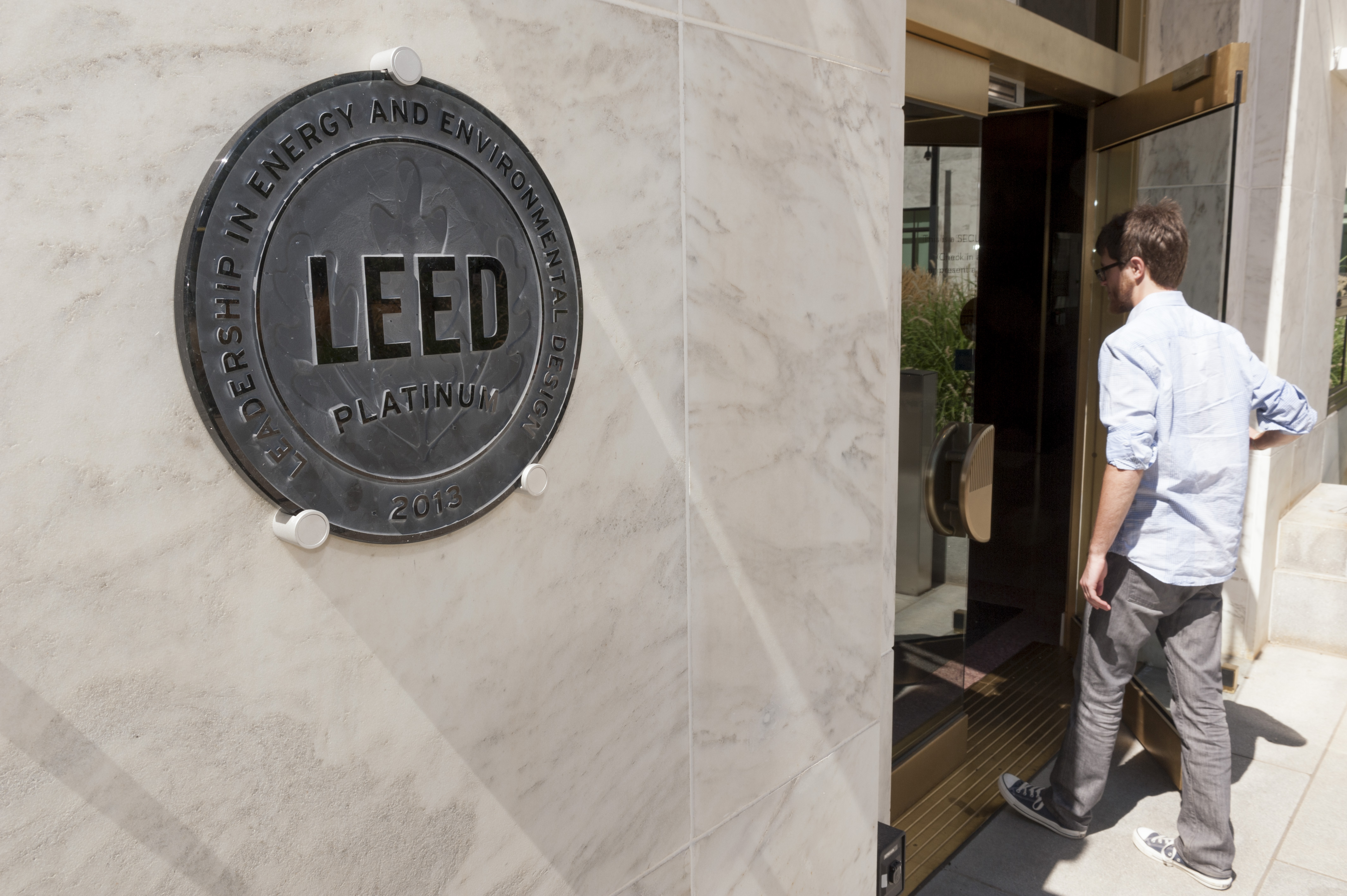
A plaque of LEED Platinum certification.

The four levels of LEED certification are: Platinum, Gold, Silver and Certified.

LEED rating levels and points required
Rating level	Points required
Platinum	80+ points
Gold	60–79 points
Silver	50–59 points
Certified	40–49 points

=== Malaysia ===
Green Building Index (GBI) is Malaysia's leading green building certification system and certification tool developed to promote sustainability in the built environment and raise awareness of environmental issues. Established in 2009, Green Building Index (GBI) provides an objective and independent framework to assess the environmental performance of buildings across various typologies and life cycles.

GBI was launched by Pertubuhan Akitek Malaysia (PAM) and the Association of Consulting Engineers Malaysia (ACEM) and is governed by a panel of independent professionals.

The Green Building Index (GBI) is a sustainability rating tool specifically developed for Malaysia's built environment, aligning closely with national regulations and standards. It is fully harmonised with key local frameworks such as Malaysian Standard MS 1525:2019 – Energy Efficiency and Use of Renewable Energy for Non-Residential Buildings and the Uniform Building By-Laws (UBBL) 1984 (Amendment 2021), ensuring relevance, compliance, and applicability within the Malaysian context.

Green Building Index is support by the Malaysia Green Building Council (malaysiaGBC) under the auspices of the World Green Building Council (WGBC)

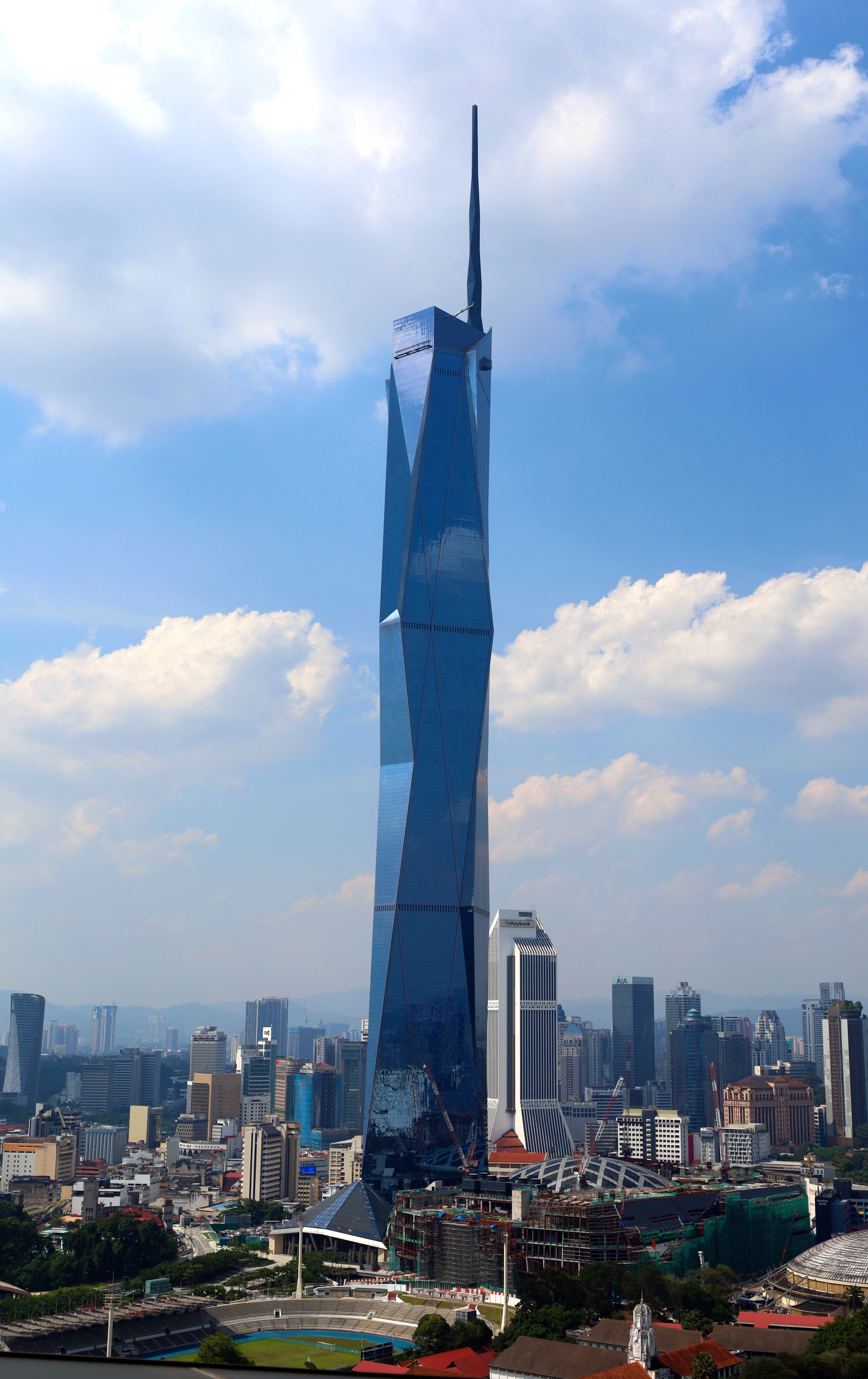
Merdeka 118 the second tallest skyscraper in the world is rated GBI Platinum

GBI certification is a voluntary initiative that recognises excellence in sustainable design and environmental performance. Each project is independently assessed by a qualified GBI Certifier based on a comprehensive set of established criteria. These criteria are as follows:

1. Energy Efficiency (EE)
2. Indoor Environmental Quality (IEQ)
3. Sustainable Site Planning & Management (SSPM)
4. Materials & Resources (MR)
5. Water Efficiency (WE)
6. Innovation (IN)

The four levels of GBI certification are: Platinum, Gold, Silver and Certified.

GBI rating levels and points required
Rating level	Points required
Platinum	86+ points
Gold	76 - 85 points
Silver	66 - 75 points
Certified	50 - 65 points
