= Green building in New Zealand =

This article is intended to give an overview of green building in New Zealand.

== Green Building Council ==

The New Zealand Green Building Council formed in July 2005. An establishment board was formed later in 2005 and with formal organisational status granted on 1 February 2006. That month Jane Henley was appointed as the CEO and activity to gain membership of the World Green Building Council began. In July 2006, the first full board was appointed with 12 members reflecting wide industry involvement. The several major milestones were achieved in 2006/2007; becoming a member of the international green building council, the launch of the Green Star NZ — Office Design Tool, and welcoming of member companies.

=== Green Star ===
The Green Star rating system is a tool implemented by the NZGBC to measure the environmental attributes and performance of buildings. The system is voluntary and similar to that of other countries.

=== Notable Green Star buildings ===
- The University of Auckland's Building 201 (B201) located at 10 Symonds Street is a 6 Green Star certified building. The building received a 93 point design rating from the New Zealand Green Building Council.

== See also ==
- Sustainability in New Zealand
- Environment of New Zealand
- Energy Efficiency and Conservation Authority
