= Seven/NEO =

Skyscraper in Bonifacio Global City, Philippines

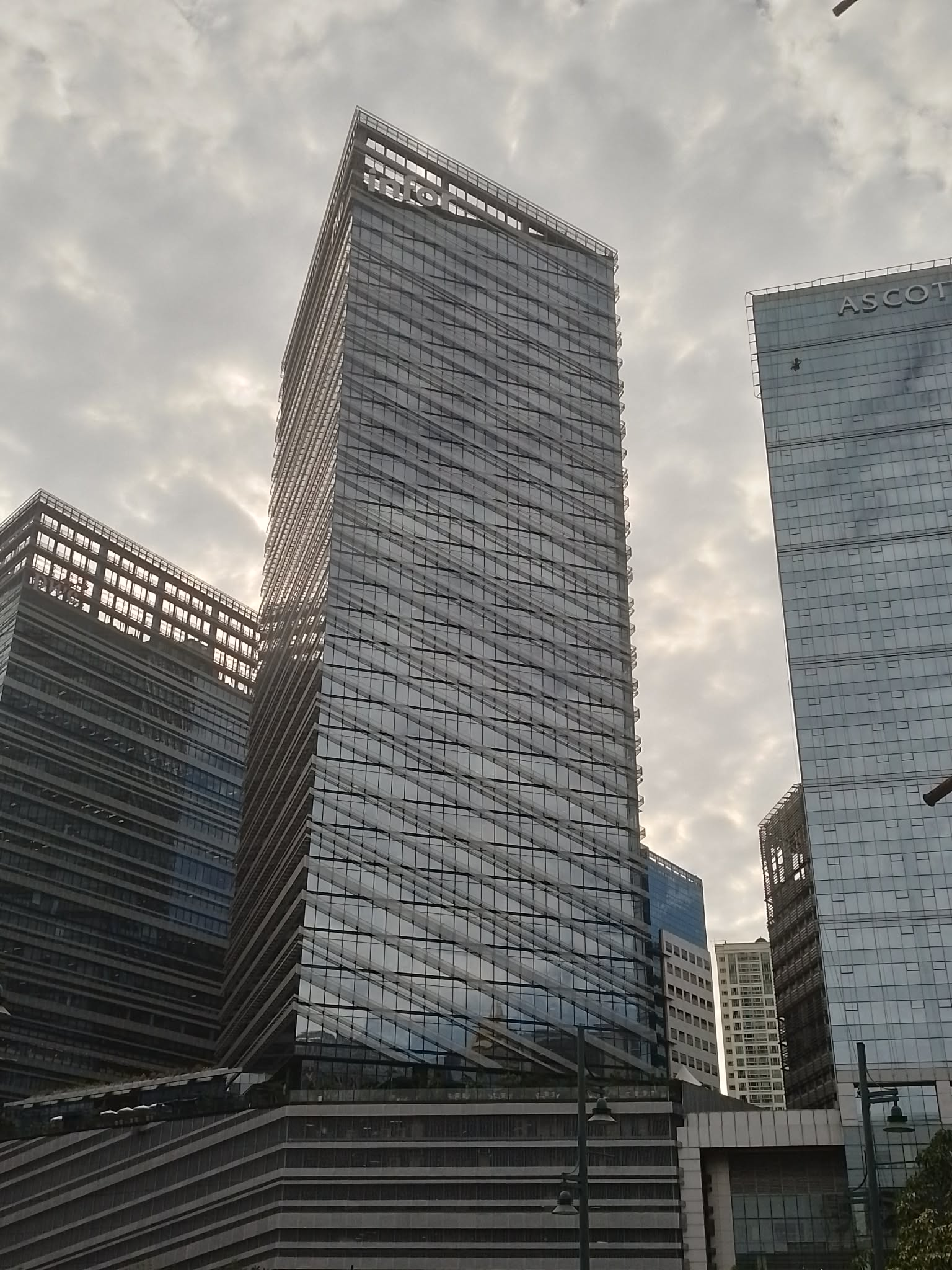

General information
- Status: Completed
- Location: 5th Avenue, Bonifacio Global City, Taguig, Philippines
- Completed: 2016

Height
- Roof: 162 m (531.50 ft)

Technical details
- Floor count: 38
- Floor area: 62,000 square meters (670,000 sq ft)

Design and construction
- Architect: Chad Oppenheim
- Developer: Charlie Rufino

Seven/NEO, formerly known as Net Park, is a 38-story green and sustainable corporate tower located in Bonifacio Global City, Metro Manila, Philippines. It is part of the office space portfolio of the NEO Group, a developer who pioneered the concept of IT office building in the Philippines. The building is part of the Net Metropolis, 5th Ave, a mixed-use development considered as the nation’s first certified green project, located in Taguig.

The Seven/NEO is the second tower to rise in the Net Metropolis, 5th Avenue, as the twin of Six/NEO (formerly Net Lima). The property was developed by Charlie Rufino of the Rufino family and designed by Chad Oppenheim, a Miami-based architect who specializes in green architecture. It was built with Ascott Bonifacio Global City, the second Ascott Residences in the Philippines and was expected to reach completion in 2015, but was completed in 2016.

== Features ==
The Seven/NEO has over 62,000 sqm. of office space with an estimated height of 38 floors. It has grade A office floor plates with a full retail ground level, podium, and park. Seven/NEO received a BERDE (Building for Ecologically Responsive Design Excellence Program) certification from the Philippine Green Building Council.

== Design ==
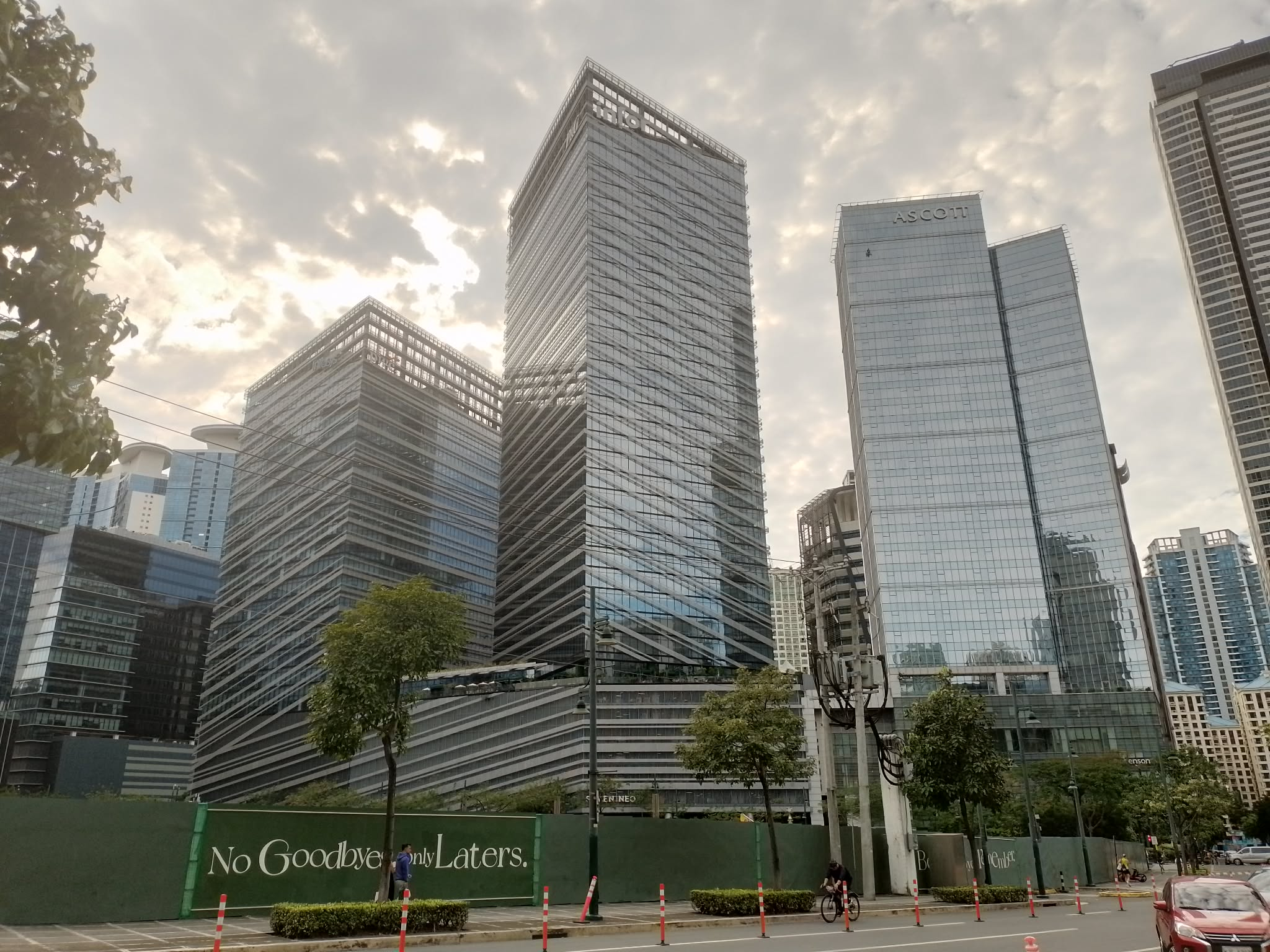
The Net Metropolis, 5th Avenue.

Together with the other buildings in the Net Metropolis, Seven/NEO is designed for sustainability. The skyscraper has passive external shading devices, roof mounted vertical access wind turbines, and a graywater reuse system designed to irrigate all on site landscaping. The towers are orientated to rotate of the other axis to allow natural light into the building and harness maximum sunlight penetration. Interior columns are also minimized to provide floor efficiency and every floor plate is flexible to accommodate differing tenant demands.

== See also ==
- List of tallest buildings in Metro Manila
