= BCI Asia Top 10 Awards =

Annual architecture and construction award across seven Asian markets

- Awarded for: Excellence in the building and design industry
- Location: Hong Kong; Indonesia; Malaysia; Philippines; Singapore; Thailand; Vietnam
- Country: Asia
- Presented by: BCI Asia (now Hubexo)
- Reward: Recognition as Top 10 developer or architecture firm in Asia
- First award: 2005; 21 years ago
- Final award: present
- Website: www.bcicentral.com

The BCI Asia Top 10 Awards (Building and Construction Information), rebranded as the Hubexo Asia Awards in 2025, is an annual awards program presented across seven Asian markets to developers and architectural firms, based primarily on the total value of their active construction projects. Established in 2005, the awards ceremonies are held in Hong Kong, Indonesia, Malaysia, the Philippines, Singapore, Thailand, and Vietnam. The program recognizes developers, contractors, and architectural firms that have made notable contributions to the built environment in the region.

== Overview ==
The awards are presented each year to the ten developers and architectural firms with the highest total construction value of projects under development in the preceding calendar year. Reported construction values are adjusted for sustainability criteria, including verified green-building certifications recognized by the World Green Building Council.

BCI Asia's evaluation methodology gives greater weight to industrial, office, and hospitality projects. The criteria also include pre-tender projects, acknowledging early-stage green design initiatives and a firm's environmental commitment from the project's inception. A single project may receive recognition twice during its lifespan: once at the tender stage and again when the main contract is awarded in a subsequent year.

The awards comprise four main categories: Top 10 Architects, Top 10 Developers, the FuturArc Prize, and the BCI Asia Interior Design Awards. The annual ceremony is held as an invitation-only event and includes networking opportunities for architects, developers, manufacturers, and service providers across Asia.

== History ==
In 2025, to mark the programme's 20th anniversary, BCI Asia rebranded the awards as the Hubexo Asia Awards, aligning the event with its parent company, Hubexo.

The 2025 ceremonies were held in person across most markets, including at the Ocean Park Marriott Hotel in Hong Kong (June 2025), the JW Marriott in Kuala Lumpur (August 2025), Raffles Jakarta (August 2025), and Shangri-La The Fort in Manila (September 2025).

== See also ==
- World Green Building Council
- Green building
- Architecture awards
