= Generation Zero =

Generation Zero may refer to:

- Generation Zero (film), a 2010 American documentary film
- Generation Zero (organisation), a New-Zealand youth-led environmental organisation
- Generation Zero (video game), a first person shooter video game
