= Green building on college campuses =

Green building on college campuses is the purposeful construction of buildings on college campuses that decreases resource usage in both the building process and also the future use of the building. The goal is to reduce CO_{2} emissions, energy use, and water use, while creating an atmosphere where students can be healthy and learn.

Universities across the country are building to green standards set forth by the USGBC, United States Green Building Council. The USGBC is a non-profit organization that promotes sustainability in how buildings are designed and built. This organization created the Leadership in Energy and Environmental Design (LEED) rating system, which is a certification process that provides verification that a building is environmentally sustainable. In the United States, commercial and residential buildings account for 70 percent of the electricity use and over 38 percent of CO_{2} emissions. Because of these huge statistics regarding resource usage and emissions, the room for more efficient building practices is dramatic. Since college campuses are where the world's future leaders are being taught, colleges are choosing to construct new buildings to green standards in order to promote environmental stewardship to their students. Colleges across the United States have taken leading roles in the construction of green building in order to reduce resource consumption, save money in the long run, and instill the importance on environmental sustainability on their students. It is a better way to motivate new generation to live a sustainable life.

== Benefits of Green Building on Campuses ==
Green buildings on college campuses provide benefits to the campus in several different ways. Campuses can benefit from the short and long-term economic benefits. Initially, federal and state governments will sometimes provide tax incentives for buildings constructed that surpass the standards set by the government. There are also long term savings. According to the USGBC, with an upfront investment of 2% in green building design, the resulting life savings is 20% of the total construction costs. With many universities lacking funding, this kind of savings could dramatically help the yearly budget. Along with this increase in monetary savings, green building and architecture has been proven to make the occupants more productive. Studies have shown a link between improved lighting design and a 27% reduction in the incidence of headaches. Also, students with the most daylighting in their classrooms progressed 20% faster on math tests and 26% faster on reading tests in one year than those with less daylighting. Both of these studies show that better lighting conditions, which are one of the main features of green buildings, can increase the productivity of its occupants. Students at colleges where green buildings are being used will benefit by increasing their potential to gain knowledge. The last important benefit of green buildings on college campuses is having the university seen as environmentally sustainable. Students are becoming increasingly aware of the issues the Earth faces with carbon emissions and increased consumption. These students want to attend universities that are striving to reduce their environmental impact. Universities participating in sustainable initiatives, like constructing green buildings, will attract more highly qualified students. Green buildings on campuses benefit both the school as well as the students.

== LEED Rating System ==
Many institutions in the United States are administering the LEED (Leadership in Energy and Environmental Design) Green Building Rating System. The development of the LEED Rating System has been nationally recognized as the leading method to construct green buildings. The rating system incorporates the design, construction, and maintenance of the building. LEED promotes a cradle-to-cradle approach in regards to construction and design materials. The rating system is composed of six sections: Site Planning, Water Management, Energy Management, Material Use, Indoor air quality, and the Innovation & Design Process. Each section is composed of credits and points, which ultimately determine how "green" the building is constructed, designed, and maintained.

=== LEED Certification Levels ===
LEED has four different levels of certification. All depending on how many credits and points were obtained through the LEED Rating System. There are 100 possible base points plus an additional 6 points for Innovation in Design and 4 points for Regional Priority.

Buildings can qualify for 4 types of certification:

- Certified: 40-49 Points
- Silver: 50-59 Points
- Gold: 60-79 Points
- Platinum: 80 points and above

=== LEED - NC Application Guide for Multiple Buildings and On-Campus Building Projects (AGMBC) ===
The USGBC has issued an application guide for administration of LEED Rating System on college, corporate, or government installations that include multiple buildings. This application is designed for projects where several buildings will be constructed at once, in phases, or a single building is constructed in a setting of existing buildings with common ownership. Note, however, that the AGMBC applies to LEED Rating System Versions 2.1 and 2.2. The methods described still apply to new construction on campuses.

==== Issues with AGMBC ====
The sustainable sites category is the most challenging category, and it is the most detailed section in the AGMBC.

- Campus settings sometimes have established property lines through campus, but share a common infrastructure between areas. (Examples include street lighting may encroach on another building, storm water routes may go into same retention areas)
- One overall sign for LEED certification, may not appeal to college trying to market LEED dedication.

==== Multi-Building Certification Methods ====
1. Certifying a new building within a setting of existing buildings that are considered a campus, i.e. there is one owner or common property management and control. Use of a retention pond not on "site" but on campus, would still qualify for LEED credit.
2. Certifying a group of new buildings as a package where the entire building set will be rated as a package and only one rating received. These buildings may constitute the entire campus or be a subset of an existing campus.
3. Certifying new buildings where each new building is constructed to a set of standards but will receive an independent rating based on achievement of credits beyond the standards specific to that building. These buildings may constitute the entire campus or be subset of an existing campus.

=== Required LEED Levels for Select Colleges ===
These are 10 colleges all around the US determined to build for a sustainable future. Each college outlines their commitment in Campus Sustainability Initiatives and Mission statements.

United States Green Building Council LEED Rating System

- Brown University - Requires a minimum of all new construction be at least "Silver"
- California Polytechnic State University - Requires a minimum of all new construction be at least "Certified."
- Georgia Institute of Technology - Requires a minimum of all new construction be at least "Certified."
- Harvard University - Requires a minimum of all new construction be at least "Silver."
- Massachusetts Institute of Technology - Requires a minimum of all new construction be at least "Silver."
- Northwestern University - Requires a minimum of all new construction be at least "Certified."
- Princeton University - Requires a minimum of all new construction be at least "Silver."
- University of Florida - Requires a minimum of all new construction be at least "Gold."
- University of North Texas - Requires a minimum of all new construction be at least "Silver."
- University of Oregon - Requires a minimum of all new construction be at least "Certified."
- University of Vermont - Requires a minimum of all new construction be at least "Silver."
- University of Florida is only college committed to a minimum of LEED "Gold" Certification

== Campus Green Building Techniques ==
The following methods are becoming more prevalent on campuses around the nation. Because of the large scale of college campuses, the impact of these methods are truly praise for energy savings and enhanced occupants' comfort.

- Green roofs - Living, vegetative roofing alternatives; a solution to the heat island effect associated with buildings.
- Low-VOC paints - Drastically limits any odorous, harmful, or irritating emissions and enhance the occupants' comfort.
- Compact fluorescent bulbs - Uses less energy and give off less heat; will save energy used to cool the building.
- Using recycled content
- Buying and using local materials - Local materials have lower transportation costs because of the lower amount of energy needed to move materials.
- Tree preservation and relocation
- Low flow plumbing fixtures - Uses less water per flush.
- Alternative transportation - Campuses use bike transportation, rapid bus transit, and safe pedestrian walkways. Zipcar is also becoming popular on many college campuses.

== Sustainable Materials used in Green Building ==
The following are some examples of sustainable products used in green building. These materials are less harmful to the environment. Now-a-days many materials have a "green" substitute.

=== Division 3: Concrete ===
- PS 4000 Flat Wall Form:
  - Improved tongue-and-groove design simplifies installation on the job and minimizes the problems associated with concrete spillage at the top of the wall.
  - The unique design provides strength, fire resistance, and dimensional stability
  - Provides you with a superior construction technology that delivers cost-effect, high-performance structures that are safer, quieter, comfortable, energy efficient, and more structurally secure and environmentally responsible building system available on the market today.
- Fly Ash
  - Because fly ash use displaces Portland cement use, it also reduces the need for cement production, which is a major energy user and a leading source of "greenhouse gas" emissions.
  - Better performance without increase in cost.
  - It can replace up to 30% by mass of Portland cement, and can add to the concrete's final strength and increase its chemical resistance and durability.

=== Division 4: Masonry ===
- Cavclear Masonry Mat
  - A fluid-conducting, non-absorbent polymer mesh made from 100% recycled plastic that is installed full-height in the airspace.
  - It prevents mortar from bridging the airspace and results in a continuous area for drainage and ventilation.
  - Ensures water management.
  - Reduces building's life-cycle costs.
- Sealtech Block
  - Certified "Green" with 10% recycled high-strength plastic powder.
  - Non-porous surface means decreased permeability, making it water-resistant.
  - Stronger than standard concrete block yet 10% lighter, translating into reduced shipping and labor costs.

=== Division 5: Metals ===
- Maze nails
  - Made from recycled steel.
  - The scrap steel generated while making nail heads goes right back to the steel mill for re-melting.
  - Nails are galvanized with a dual Zinc coating for durability assurance.
- Cold-formed metal framing
  - Lightweight, and dimensionally stable.
  - Contains 20-25% recycled material (10-15% post-consumer content, though some manufactures have in excess of 90% of recycled content.)
  - Steel studs can even be recycled at end of building's life.

=== Division 6: Woods, Plastics, and Composites ===
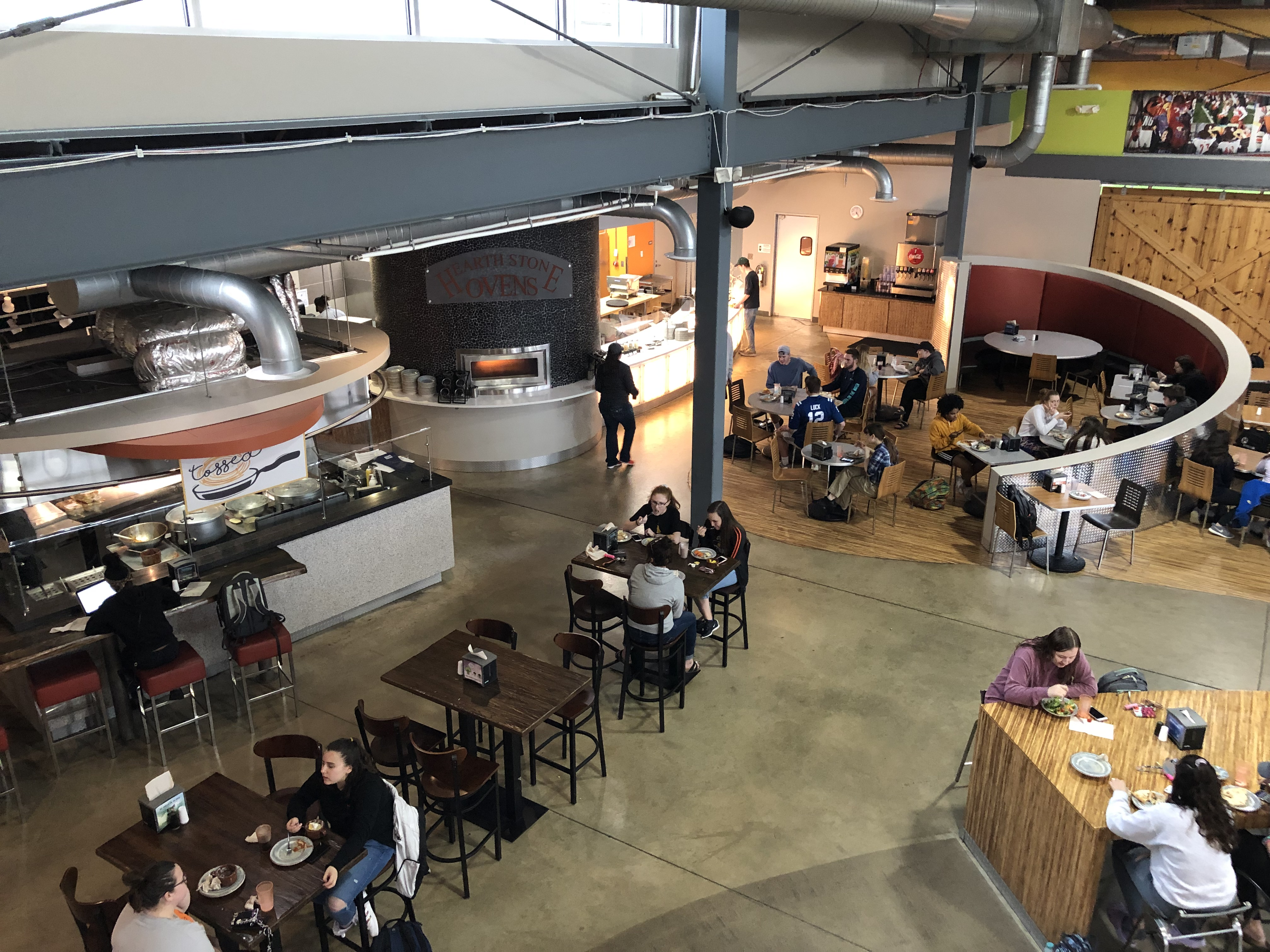
This dining hall uses wood recycled from local barns.

- Ecosurfaces
  - Made from recycled tires.
  - Slip-resistant.
  - Weather resistant, able to withstand extreme temperatures
- Reclaimed lumber
  - If not reused, wood would be burned or chipped
  - Old growth forests are protected
  - Durable and aesthetically pleasing.
  - The wood has become stabilized over time, which prevents changes due to humidity.
- Engineered wood, Gluecam
  - Provide a significant environmental advantage over solid wood by using fast-growing, small diameter trees effectively.
- Plastic lumber
  - Makes use of recycled plastic and is an effective replacement for pressure-treated lumber, which also protects timber resources.
  - Will not rot, absorb water, splinter, or crack
  - Resistant to oil, salt, and chemicals

=== Division 7: Thermal and Moisture Protection ===
- Concrete roof tiles
  - Made from an approximate mix of 3 parts sand to 1 part cement and 10% water.
  - Limited maintenance is necessary.
  - Concrete tiles are wind resistant.
  - Can last up to 100 years.

=== Division 8: Openings ===
- Greenscreen PVC-free fabrics
  - PVC-Free construction of polyurethane and specially designed, pre-stretched polyester core.
  - 5 different levels of visibility: 3%, 5%, 10%, and 25%.
  - Elimination of PVC content in production of GreenScreen fabrics mean shades contain no VOC's and does not "offgas" during the life of the product.
  - PVC-content makes it easier and quicker to recycle GreenScreen fabrics and divert them from landfills.

=== Division 9: Finishes ===
- Marmoleum Flooring
  - Raw materials and energy are used efficiently, waste is recycled wherever possible, and emissions are kept to an absolute minimum.
  - Life-cycle analysis shows that these linoleum products are ecologically preferred floor covering.
  - Linoleum is produced from renewable materials: linseed oil, wood flour, jute and ecologically responsible pigments.
  - Organic product.
- Cork floating floor
  - Highly compressible and resilient.
  - Excellent sound and thermal insulator.
  - Lightweight and buoyant.
  - Natural fire retardant, hypoallergenic, and insect resistant.
- Australian Chestnut flooring
  - LEED Qualification: MR 7-Certified Wood
  - Product is certified according to the principles & criteria of the Forest Stewardship Council (FSC), adhering to strict environmental and social standards
  - Easily meets E-1 Standard for Indoor Air Quality
- Bamboo flooring
  - Bamboo is not wood, but rather a type of grass.
  - Quick renewable resource, can be harvested in as little as 5 years.
  - Very strong and stable, more so than many hardwoods
  - Less likely to swell or shrink

=== Division 12: Furnishings ===
- Climatex upholstery fabrics used for climate control seating
  - Climatex is a mixture of three fibers to provide seating comfort.
    - Pure wool, which is excellent for heat conservation and great for moisture absorption.
    - Polyester, which allows for a fast humidity transport.
    - Ramie, which offers a cooling effect and great moisture transport.

=== Division 26- Electrical ===
- Evergreen solar panels
  - A rigid, double walled, deep frame with integrated water drainage holes.
  - Low energy - an energy payback time as rapid as 18 months.
  - Low carbon and low lead used.

== International Campus Sustainability ==
=== Organizations ===
==== International Sustainable Campus Network ====
Universities have a leadership role in advancing knowledge, technology and tools to create a sustainable future. To fulfill this role effectively and with high credibility, they need to include a focus on sustainability also in their own operations and facilities. Campus projects, be they educational or corporate campus developments, present interesting sustainability challenges and opportunities. Firstly, their size is at the borderline between single building projects and small towns, a fruitful scale for innovative energy and transport solutions. And secondly, they are to a certain degree one-purpose neighborhoods focused on education, research, development or distribution of new ideas, products or services.

- Goal 1: sustainable construction, renovation, and operation
- Goal 2. sustainable master planning and development, mobility, and community integration
- Goal 3. linking facilities, research and education for sustainable development

Partners: Technische Universität Darmstadt, Australian National University, University of California, Berkeley, City of Zurich, Dundalk Institute of Technology, Swiss Federal Institute of Technology in Lausanne (EPFL), Swiss Federal Institute of Technology in Zurich (ETH Zurich), Harvard University, HEEPI, Hosei University, KTH Royal Institute of Technology, Los Angeles Community College District, National University of Singapore, Pontifical Catholic University of Peru, Stanford University, The Sustainability Forum, Tongji University, University of Applied Sciences of Trier-Birkenfeld, University of Copenhagen, University of Zurich – CCRS, University of Gothenburg, University of Luxembourg and Yale University.

==== International Green Construction Code ====
The International Green Construction Code is a part of the International Code Council (ICC). As part of its commitment to green and sustainable safety concepts, the Code Council is excited to develop a new set of green codes under the multi-year initiative called "IGCC: Safe and Sustainable by the Book." This initiative will include collaboration from the council's closest allies and pre-eminent thought leaders in green building, as well as outreach and feedback from our members and the general public. The International Green Construction Code is committed to developing an effective and efficient code that will continue our long tradition of international code guidance.

==== World Green Building Council ====
The World Green Building Council is an international organization that facilitates the green building councils of many developed and developing nations. The Council started in 1999 with its first meeting in California. Eight members attended the first meeting: U.S. Green Building Council, Green Building Council of Australia, Spain Green Building Council, United Kingdom Green Building Council, Japan Green Building Council, United Arab Emirates, Russia and Canada. THE WorldGBC incorporated in 2002 and operates from Toronto, Canada. There are currently over 15 established GBCs and 35 emerging and prospective countries with GBCs.

== Campus Green Building Case Studies ==
=== United States ===
==== Stanford University: Knight Management Center ====
Stanford is a leading university in the green movement and the school is striving to achieve a LEED Platinum certification for their new graduate school of business, the Knight Management Center. The goal for this building is to open in the winter of 2011. The center will have eight buildings around three quadrangles with 360,000 square feet (33,000 m^{2}) of interior space. According to the principal architect, Stan Boles of Boora Architects in Portland, Oregon, "The orientation of the buildings is narrow in the north-south dimension. They are designed for optimum daylighting, ventilation, and for shading of one another. The exterior walls are designed so that areas of glass are created but shaded by exterior screens to prevent excessive heat gain." This project aims to:

- Reduce overall water usage by at least 40%.
- Exceed current energy efficiency standards by at least 40%.
- Generate at least 12% electricity on site through solar energy.
- Use rainwater or re-circulated gray water to reduce potable water use for building sewage conveyance by 80%.
- Recycle or salvage 50% to 70% of non-hazardous construction debris.
- Use low- or non-volatile organic compound-emitting materials to ensure exceptional indoor air quality.

Stanford's president, John L. Hennessy, said, "One of the biggest global challenges facing us today is the sustainable use of our planets natural resources. The Graduate School of Business will play a key role in helping us address these challenges by leading the way in its sustainable development of this new campus." Stanford University is taking an active role in constructing green buildings on their campus and the Knight Management Center will be a great example of how a building can be sustainable.

==== University of California at Santa Barbara: Donald Bren School of Environmental Science & Management ====
The Donald Bren School of Environmental Science & Management is located at the University of California, Santa Barbara, California. The academic laboratory and classroom facility demonstrates cost-effective, energy-efficient technologies and operations. The concrete and steel frame structure was complete in 2002 and cost approximately $27,500,000. Donald Bren Hall was the first laboratory to receive LEED Platinum accreditation, the highest rating achievable through the US Green Building Council's national rating system, with the following building design features:

- Site Protection: Since Donald Bren Hall is located adjacent to the ocean, a strict site protection plan was developed and implemented to ensure all storm water is retained onsite to prevent contamination of local waterways.
- Water Efficiency: A separate reclaimed water system was installed to furnish greywater to flush toilets and irrigate the landscape. Waterless urinals were also installed and it is estimated that each waterless urinal will save approximately 45,000 gallons of water per year.
- Energy Efficiency: Design includes a 40 KW rooftop photovoltaic system, natural ventilation linked with a window interlock system for heating, daylighting controls, energy-efficient lighting, high efficiency boiler, and chiller integrated into a virtual chilled water loop. These energy efficiency measures assisted the building to exceed Title 24 (1998 Standards) by 31%.
- Materials Efficiency: 93% of the construction waste generated onsite was diverted from the landfill. Recycled-content products include 12-20% flyash in the concrete, glass tiles and countertops, 100% postconsumer recycled content carpet, and tire-derived rubber flooring. Other environmentally preferable products for the interior surface materials included linoleum and natural cork flooring, bamboo cabinetry, and stained concrete flooring.

According to Great Buildings, "The Donald Bren School at the University of California, Santa Barbara takes advantage of a beautiful setting near the Pacific Ocean to become a green building that embraces its environment not only for efficiency, but for experience. With a striking open courtyard, it provides ample opportunity for social interaction that makes the transition between indoors and outdoors much smoother and ephemeral than most buildings. Building Bren Hall with sustainable materials and methods is estimated to have added only 2% to the building cost, which will easily be offset over time by energy savings."

==== University of North Carolina at Chapel Hill: Botanical Gardens Education Center ====
The 29,656-square-foot (2,755.1 m^{2}) Education Center is located at the University of North Carolina at Chapel Hill. The building consists of three major sections connected by covered breezeways. The central wing welcomes visitors to the education center as they enter the garden through a large breezeway. The east wing offers classrooms for students enrolled in workshops and classrooms, and the west wing features the Reeves Auditorium. This large multipurpose space is used for lectures, conferences, and special events. The Education Center plans to achieve a LEED Platinum rating, most likely the first ever in North Carolina, with these features:

- Site Selection and Design: The Education center was located with an efficient solar orientation. Also, during the construction process, there was minimal disturbance to grade, and existing vegetation was well protected.
- Water Efficiency: The building uses water-efficient native landscaping and low-flow plumbing. Stormwater is conserved and re-used. Rainwater cisterns, gardens, and retention swales are also methods being used.
- Energy Efficiency: Geothermal wells for efficient heating and air-conditioning are used. Photovoltaic and solar cells have been installed on the building, and natural lighting is used very effectively along with day sensors that automatically dim lights when daylight is too strong.
- Materials Efficiency: To minimize transportation costs and carbon dioxide emissions, and to stimulate local economies, all materials were locally and sustainably produced. No wood came from old-growth trees; all the wood came from certified sustainable forests. At least 75% of the construction waste was recycled, and there was no non-toxic or off-gassing.

The new Education Center expresses a sense of place and celebrates relationships between humans and nature through the integration of indoor and outdoor spaces. Open breezeways, comfortable porches, natural light in every room, beautiful native plant landscaping, and educational exhibits inform, delight, and invite visitors to the Conservation Garden. Most of all, the building is a center of learning, teaching both the science and the enjoyment of plants and nature.

==== University of Florida: James W. Heavener Football Complex ====
The University of Florida's new football complex, the James W. Heavener Football Complex, was completed in 2008 and received LEED Platinum rating for the environmental sustainability of the building. The facility contractor was PPI Construction Management and the architect was RDG Planning and Design. The building includes offices, conference rooms, an atrium to display the football teams accomplishments, and a weight training facility. The LEED rated the complex 52 out of the 69 available points for the certification, which gave the building the Platinum rating. This facility is the first platinum athletic facility in the United States as well as the first platinum rated building in the state of Florida. The $28 million building exceeded the original goal of obtaining a LEED Silver rating.

This building has many features that helped it to achieve the Platinum level. The features dealing with water usage reduce the buildings indoor water use by 40 percent. Due to all of the facility's energy saving features the building has exceeded the state and national energy requirements by 35 percent. Another interesting fact about the construction of this building is that most of the material used in the construction came from within 500 miles of the University of Florida, which reduce the emissions created form transporting the material. Also 78 percent of the building debris was recycled. The assistant director of LEED at UF, Bahar Armaghani, said, "Green Buildings are not exclusively concerned with saving money through more efficient technology. They are also investments for the well-being of the people and environment." The University of Florida has taken on an initiative to have all new construction be LEED Gold certified or higher and with the construction of this facility the school has surpassed their own requirements by achieving the Platinum rating.

Key Features of the Heavener Football Complex:

- Occupancy sensors to control lighting
- Organic carpet
- Paint and flooring made out of recycled materials
- Low-flow water fixture and water saving shower heads
- Dual-flush toilets
- Low-e glazing, insulation, and reflective material on glass
- Green roof on weight room
- 100% reclaimed water for irrigation

==== High Point University School of Education ====
High Point University, located in High Point, North Carolina, has a LEED-Certified building that houses the School of Education. The 31,000-square-foot building houses the education and psychology departments in technologically advanced classrooms, computer labs and offices. It features high-tech educational equipment, such as smart boards, a children's book library, math and science touch screen games, a methods lab designed to look and feel like a real elementary school classroom, a Mac lab and psychology research booths. The School of Education building is setting an example for modern-day energy conservation with things like floor to ceiling windows for natural lighting and light sensors in the rooms.

Key Statistics:

- Water usage is cut by 30 percent inside the building and by 50 percent in its irrigation system
- Energy usage is decreased by 24 percent.

=== International ===
==== Charles Hostler Student Center ====
The Charles Hostler Student Center on the campus of the American University of Beirut provides a model for environmentally responsive design that meets the social needs of the campus and the larger region. Situated on Beirut's seafront and main public thoroughfare, the new 204,000 sq ft (19,000 m^{2}). facility houses competitive and recreational athletic facilities for swimming, basketball, handball, volleyball, squash, exercise and weight training. The space also includes an auditorium with associated meeting rooms, cafeteria with study space, and underground parking for 200 cars.

Green Building methods:

- Organized as building clusters as opposed to a single building. Allowing the building forms themselves to redistribute air, activity and shade.
- The east–west orientation of the building forms helps to shade exterior courtyards, reducing the amount of southern exposure.
- The orientation also directs nighttime breezes and daytime sea breezes to cool outdoor spaces.
- Green spaces on the rooftops allow for a more pleasing physical and visual integration with the upper campus, providing usable rooftop areas for activities and reducing the amount of exposure to the sun.
- Usable program area on the site is increased through shading and ventilation of outdoor spaces

==== Dubai International Academic City Phase-III ====
Dubai International Academic City Phase-III (DIAC phase-III) comprises four academic buildings and a food court spread over a total built up area of 600,000 square feet (56,000 m^{2}). It has received the Silver LEED certification, and is expected to save approximately AED2.3 million per year from reduced energy costs, district cooling demand changes, irrigation water costs, sewage tanker and domestic water costs.

Green Building component Features:

- Heat recovery wheels
- Enhanced levels of insulation
- Optimization of fresh air through variable speed drives on air handling units
- Recessed windows
- Significantly low lighting power densities

These features will make this cluster 21.7% more energy efficient than the American Society of Heating, Refrigerating and Air-Conditioning Engineers (ASHRAE) 90.1 - 2004 standards. will also consume 30% less water than the standards set by U.S. Environmental Protection Agency (EPA) as well as 40% less irrigation water. These savings have been achieved by the installation of ultra-low flow water restrictors in wash basins and dual-flush tanks in wash rooms, as well as additives in the soil for the landscape areas.

== See also ==
1. "LEED For New Construction". USGBC. Retrieved 2009-11-13.
