= Green building council =

Logo of the World Green Building Council, which acts as an umbrella organization for existing, emerging and developing GBCs around the world

A Green Building Council (GBC) is any national non-profit, non-government organization that is part of a global network recognized by the World Green Building Council. A green building council's goal is to promote a transformation of the built environment towards one that is sustainable (buildings and cities that are environmentally sensitive, economically viable, socially just and culturally significant).

== List of recognised GBCs ==
As of December 2022, there were at least 41 nations with established GBCs, 10 recognized as "emerging" members, 26 countries in the prospective category and 2 in the affiliate category.

The Green Building Council Russia formed in 2009 and is seeking Emerging Status. Growth in the CIS countries accompanies growth in the number of green construction projects in those countries, that is, those certified to LEED or BREEAM standard.

List of the 41 Established Green Building Councils

- Argentina Green Building Council
- Green Building Council of Australia
- Austrian Sustainable Building Council
- Green Building Council Brasil
- Canada Green Building Council
- Chile Green Building Council
- China Green Building Council
- Colombia Green Building Council
- Green Building Council Costa Rica
- Croatia Green Building Council
- Dutch Green Building Council
- Emirates Green Building Council
- Green Building Council Finland
- France Green Building Council (this NGO merged with the French HQE Association in 2016 to form the HQE Association-France GBC, which brought together more than 200 members)
- German Sustainable Building Council
- Guatemala Green Building Council
- Hong Kong Green Building Council
- Indian Green Building Council
- Green Building Council Indonesia
- Irish Green Building Council
- Italy Green Building Council
- Jordan Green Building Council
- Japan Green Building Consortium
- Korea Green Building Council
- Malaysia Green Building Council
- Mexico Green Building Council
- New Zealand Green Building Council
- Pakistan Green Building Council
- Panama Green Building Council
- Peru Green Building Council
- Philippine Green Building Council
- Polish Green Building Council
- Singapore Green Building Council
- Green Building Council of South Africa
- Green Building Council España
- Sweden Green Building Council
- Taiwan Green Building Council
- Turkish Green Building Council
- Romania Green Building Council
- UK Green Building Council
- U.S. Green Building Council

List of Emerging Green Building Councils

- Bulgarian Green Building Council
- Swiss Sustainable Building Council
- Egypt Green Building Council
- Sustainable Building Council Greece
- Kuwait Green Building Council
- Kazakhstan Green Building Council
- Lebanon Green Building Council
- Paraguay Green Building Council
- El Salvador Green Building Council

List of Prospective Green Building Councils

- Bahrain Green Building Council
- Green Building Council Bolivia
- Botswana Green Building Council
- Green Building Council Cameroon
- CEES Ecuador Green Building Council
- Ghana Green Building Council
- Green Building Council Iceland
- Cambodia Green Building Council
- Green Building Council of Sri Lanka
- Luxembourg Green Building Council
- Morocco Green Building Council
- Green Building Council Mauritius
- Green Building Council Namibia
- Green Building Council Nigeria
- Panama Green Building Council
- Palestine Green Building Council
- Serbia Green Building Council
- Rwanda Green Building Organization
- Green Building Council Slovenia
- Tunisia Green Building Council
- Tanzania Green Building Council
- Uganda Green Building Council
- Uruguay Green Building Council
- Venezuela Green Building Council
- Vietnam Green Building Council
- Green Building Council Zimbabwe

As of the mid-2025, there were over 80 GBCs at various stages of development.

== See also ==
- Sustainable architecture
- Sustainable city
