= Ten Museum Park =

Residential skyscraper in Miami

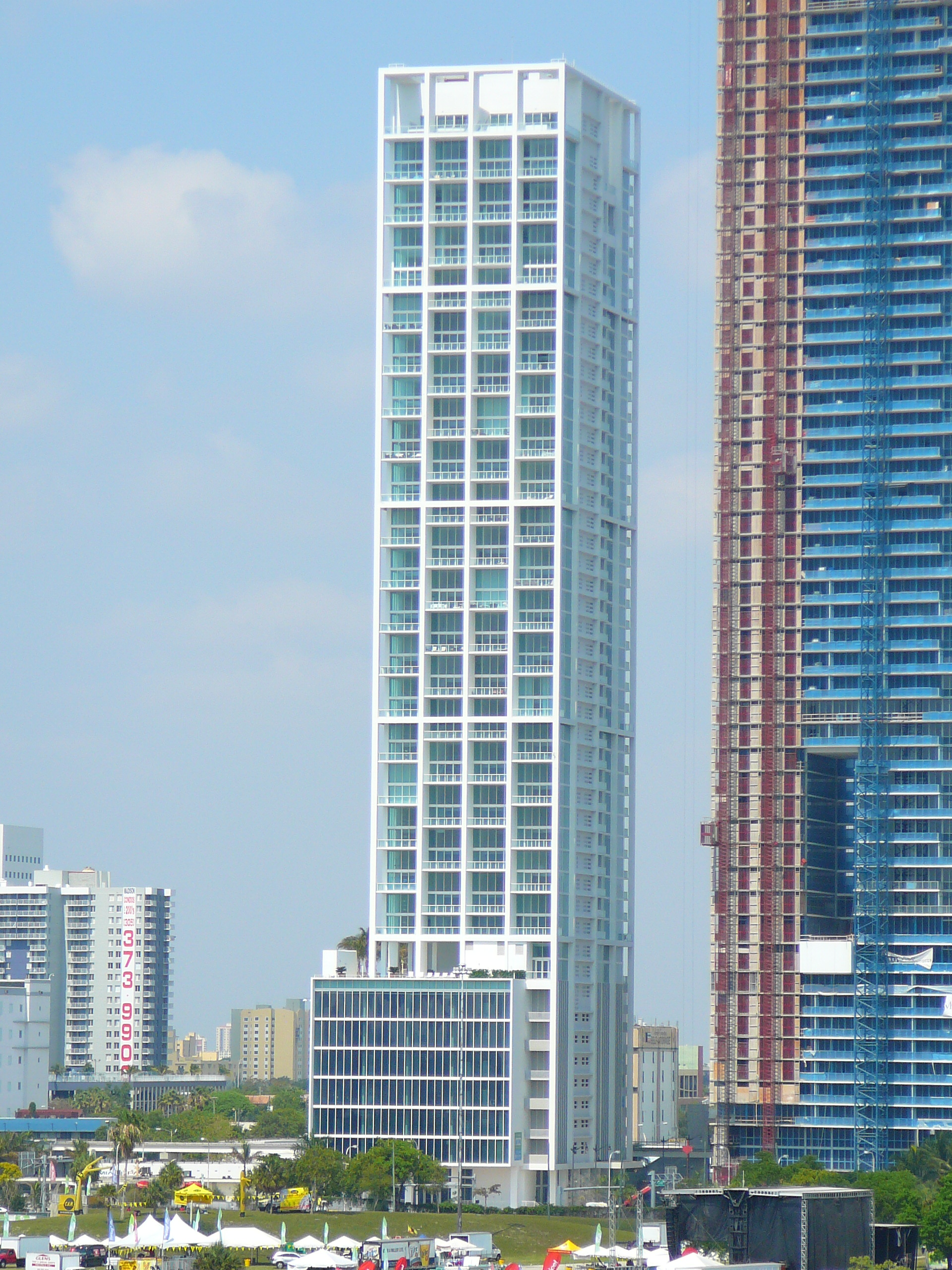
- Ten Museum Park in May 2008
- Interactive map of the Ten Museum Park area

General information
- Location: 1040 Biscayne Boulevard, Miami, Florida
- Coordinates: 25.7846°N 80.1900°W
- Construction started: 2005
- Completed: 2007
- Opening: 2007

Height
- Roof: 585 ft (178.3 m)

Technical details
- Floor count: 50

Design and construction
- Architect: Oppenheim Architecture + Design
- Developer: Gregg Covin Development

Ten Museum Park is a residential skyscraper in Miami, Florida. It is located in northeastern Downtown, on Biscayne Bay along the west side of Biscayne Boulevard. It was designed by Chad Oppenheim of Oppenheim Architecture + Design. Completed in early 2007, it opened for residential occupancy in mid-2007. The building is 585 feet (178 m) tall, and has 50 floors with 200 units. The building itself is designed to reflect the heat from the sun while still keeping warmth, and designed to withstand 140 mph winds. As of June 2020, it stood as the 22nd-tallest building in Miami.

Ten Museum Park contains 20,000 square feet (1,858 m^{2}) of Class A office space, retail space on the lower floors, and residential condominium units, which occupy most of the space on the upper floors.

== See also ==
- List of tallest buildings in Miami
- Downtown Miami
- List of tallest buildings in Florida
