= Oppenheim Architecture =

- Type: Private company
- Industry: Architecture
- Founded: 1999
- Founder: Chad Oppenheim
- Services: Architecture, interior design, planning
- Website: www.oppenoffice.com

Oppenheim Architecture is an architecture, planning, and interior practice based in Miami, New York City, and Basel founded in 1999 by Chad Oppenheim. The firm has received multiple distinctions, including over 45 AIA Awards. Projects range between hospitality, commercial mixed-use, retail, and residential buildings in over 25 countries. The firm is notable for designing L.A. Villa, film director Michael Bay's residence. In 2018, the practice received the National Design Award for Interior Design by Cooper Hewitt, Smithsonian Design Museum.

== History ==
Oppenheim Architecture was established in 1999 by Chad Oppenheim. Oppenheim earned his B.Arch from Cornell University in 1994. Upon graduating, he worked at the Miami-based architecture and design firm Arquitectonica until 1999, when he departed to establish his own practice. Together with Beat Huesler, Chad Oppenheim opened the Basel office in 2009. Oppenheim Architecture New York opened in 2015.

== Selected projects ==
- 2024 Desert Rock Resort, Hanak, Saudi Arabia
- 2021 Escondido, Malibu
- 2020 Star Metals Residences, Atlanta
- 2018 Ayla Golf Clubhouse, Aqaba, Jordan
- 2018 Emiliano Hotel, Rio de Janeiro
- 2017 GLF Headquarters, Miami
- 2016 Villa Allegra, Miami
  - Chad Oppenheim's private residences
- 2015 Net Metropolis, Manila
  - First certified green building in the Philippines
- 2015 AIA Miami Silver Award for Design
- 2014 L.A.Villa, Los Angeles
  - Michael Bay's private residences
- 2013 House on a Dune, Bahamas
- 2012 La Muna, Red Mountain, Aspen, Colorado
- 2012 Kirchplatz Office, Basel, Switzerland
- 2009 Simpson Park Hammock Pavilion, Miami
- 2007 Ten Museum Park, Miami
  - Ranks among the 20 tallest buildings in Miami

== Selected awards ==
- 2018 National Design Award for Interior Design by Cooper Hewitt, Smithsonian Design Museum
- 2016 AIA Florida/Caribbean, Honor Award of Excellence (L.A. Villa)
- 2016 AIA Miami, Honor Award of Excellence (Bal Harbour House; South Beach Penthouse)
- 2015 AIA Miami Merit Award of Excellence (L.A. Villa)
- 2014 AIA Miami Design Awards (House on a Dune)
- 2013 AIA Miami Firm of the Year
- 2013 Chicago Athenaeum International Architecture Award (Wharf Road, Australia)
- 2012 Design Center of the Americas Stars of Design Annual Award for Architecture
- 2011 World Architecture Festival (Wadi Rum Desert Resort)
- 2008 AIA Miami Design Awards (Ten Museum Park)
- 2006 AIA Miami Design Awards (Park Avenue, Cube, COR)

== Publications ==
- Four Florida Moderns, by Saxon Henry, Norton, 2010. ISBN 978-0-393-73274-0.
- Spirit of Place, published by Tra Publishing, 2018. ISBN 978-0-9986931-1-8.
- LAIR: Radical Homes and Hideouts of Movie Villains, published by Tra Publishing, 2019. ISBN 978-1-7322978-6-9.
