= Govt3 =

New Zealand government sustainability programme

Govt^{3} was a sustainability programme operated by the New Zealand government. It was managed by the Ministry for the Environment. "Govt" stands for government and "3" stands for the three pillars of sustainability: environmental, social and economic.

The programme was set up under a Labour led government in 2003 to encourage government departments to minimise waste and adopt sustainable practices. By July 2007 48 central government agencies had joined the programme and by 2009 the programme was saving the Government over $4 million each year through reduced travel demand (internal and international flights and taxis), double sided printing and other initiatives to reduce the amount of office consumables being used, lowered buildings operating costs through smart design of new buildings and energy efficiency retrofitting of existing buildings, reduced amount of waste going to landfill, improved procurement practices and other initiatives . The National led government, which came into power in October 2008, ended the scheme in March 2009.

The programmes work areas were sustainable building, transport, office consumables and waste. The sustainable building work stream built the financial case (The Value Case for sustainable building in New Zealand) for setting best practice performance targets for new and existing Government buildings. The sustainable building team worked with the industry to develop New Zealand specific performance targets and benchmarks (funded the industry adopt of the Green Star NZ rating scheme) to raise the overall environment and economic performance of Government buildings (all new buildings were to be 5 Star Green Star NZ by 2012). The team also developed an innovative sustainable building management tool (Build360) as a way of ensuring sustainable building practices were considered throughout the life-cycle of a building.

== See also ==
- Sustainability in New Zealand
- Environment of New Zealand
