= Jordan Green Building Council =

Environmental organisation

- المجلس الاردني للابنية الخضراء
- Founded: 2012
- Location: Amman
- Region served: Jordan
- Key people: En. Abdullah Bdeir (Chairman)
- Website: https://www.jordangbc.org/

Jordan Green Building Council (Arabic: المجلس الأردني للأبنية الخضراء) is a Jordanian member-based organization established in 2009. It received its "Established Member" status after the formal acceptance from World Green Building Council in April 2012. Its mission is to promote and advocate for the adoption of Green Building Practices in all phases of the building process leading towards making Green Buildings a widespread reality in Jordan. The Council is part of a global network of more than 80 GBCs worldwide and holds the authority to represent the World Green Building Council (WGBC) in Jordan.
