= Sustainability in New Zealand =

sustainability.govt.nz was a website promoting sustainability, operated by the Ministry for the Environment.

Recognition of sustainability in New Zealand has grown over the years.

== History ==
New Zealand government responses to environmental issues, at both the central and local levels, were largely ad hoc until the 1960s, when the environmental movement arose as a social and political force. In 1972, the Values Party was formed and became the first national-level Green party.

The New Zealand government has since incorporated sustainability principles into law, most notably with the Resource Management Act 1991. This legislation was the first to explicitly adopt the principle of sustainability. In 2003, the government announced its Sustainable Development Programme of Action. That same year, the Govt^{3} programme was launched; it was later discontinued in March 2009.

Support has also grown for the concept of green growth, a model of economic development that uses natural resources in a sustainable way. The Ministry of Economic Development established the Green Growth Advisory Group, and the lobby group Pure Advantage was formed in July 2011 to advocate for sustainable economic policies. In 2012, Pure Advantage released a report stating that New Zealand should improve its environmental performance as well as its image.

Some environmental rankings, such as Yale University's Environmental Performance Index, have suggested that New Zealand was not improving its overall sustainability.

As in many other countries, demand among consumers for sustainable products and services grew, and some companies began to target this market. In March 2007, Westpac became the first New Zealand bank to offer a "green" home loan.

== Strengths ==
International business adviser, author and speaker Paul Gilding believes New Zealand dairy farmers have a significant advantage over those in other countries because they use pasture-fed systems, rather than grain-fed systems as in the US. Another advantage is New Zealand's reputation as a clean and green country, at least compared with most other countries. "As the demand rises for clean and green food, the better off New Zealand dairy is," Gilding said.

== Measuring progress ==
In 2002, a range of recommendations were made regarding indicators of sustainability. It was suggested that the ecological footprint be used as a cost-effective and easily understood indicator, accessible to the general public.

== Sectors ==
=== Waste ===
Supermarket shopping bags have been targeted as a means of reducing waste.

=== Energy efficiency and conservation ===
EECA Cycling Public transport

== Sustainability in agricultural practices ==
Although agriculture accounts for only 7% of New Zealand's GDP, agricultural products remain one of the country's biggest exports. While New Zealand is striving to become more sustainable, intensified cattle farming and monoculture systems have contributed to water quality degradation, greenhouse gas emissions, and biodiversity loss. González-Orozco's (2020) study supports this viewpoint, arguing that the stability of New Zealand's agriculture depends on its ability to adapt to shifting environmental conditions.

Some sheep farmers have adopted rotational grazing systems, which allow pastures to regenerate and sequester carbon. Another strategy involves investing in genetic improvements for sheep breeds to improve efficiency while reducing resource use.

== See also ==
- Conservation in New Zealand
- Energy Efficiency and Conservation Authority
- Environment of New Zealand
- Generation Zero (organisation)
- Green building in New Zealand
- New Zealand Centre for Sustainable Cities
