= Energy Efficiency and Conservation Act 2000 =

Act of Parliament in New Zealand

Energy Efficiency and Conservation Act

New Zealand Parliament
- Long title: to promote, in New Zealand, energy efficiency, energy conservation, and the use of renewable sources of energy.
- Royal assent: 15 May 2000
- Commenced: 1 July 2000
- Administered by: Energy Efficiency and Conservation Authority

Legislative history
- Introduced by: Jeanette Fitzsimons
- Passed: 2000
- Status: Current legislation

The Energy Efficiency and Conservation Act is an act of parliament in New Zealand. It is administered by the Ministry for the Environment.

The act established the Energy Efficiency and Conservation Authority.

The act requires the Energy Efficiency and Conservation Authority to prepare a national energy efficiency and conservation strategy for approval by the administering Minister.

The minister is required to have a national energy efficiency and conservation strategy in force at all times.

== See also ==
- Energy in New Zealand
