= David Gottfried =

American real estate developer, author and green building activist

David Gottfried is an American author and green building activist. As the co-founder of the U.S. Green Building Council (USGBC) and the founder of the World Green Building Council, he is widely recognized as the father of the global green building movement.

== Career ==
=== Green Building Councils ===
In April 1993, Gottfried, at the time a construction manager and real estate developer, along with Michael Italiano, an environmental lawyer, and Rick Fedrizzi, head of environmental marketing at Carrier at the time, founded the nonprofit U.S. Green Building Council (USGBC), in order to promote sustainable practices in the building and construction industry with the aim of defining green building and improving building performance.

USGBC created the LEED building certification system in 2000. Through the USGBC, LEED has grown into the most widely used and well recognized green building rating system in the world with 197,000 LEED projects in 186 countries and territories and covering over 29 billion square feet as of 2024.

Gottfried created and managed the formation of the “United Nations of the Green Building Councils” with the founding meeting of the World Green Building Council held in California, US in 1999. In 2002, the WorldGBC was officially formed with the countries: Australia, Brazil, Canada, India, Japan, Mexico, Spain, and US. There are now Green Building Councils in 85 countries.

=== Other work ===
Gottfried currently serves as Founder & CEO of Regen360, providing strategic advisory to leading organizations across decarbonization, sustainability, and regeneration. He is also an active keynote speaker, having delivered keynotes in more than 15 countries, hosts the Regen360 podcast with over 80 episodes, and has lectured at Stanford University for three decades.

Previously, Gottfried led Regenerative Ventures and its RegenNetwork for two decades, advising hundreds of organizations on sustainable building strategy.

He also previously served as the chief commercial officer for Blue Planet Systems, which creates Synthetic Limestone aggregate with a potential to permanently store gigatons of carbon dioxide in carbon negative concrete.

He founded WorldBuild Technologies Inc, a San Francisco sustainable development consultant firm, with clients such as Yahoo, Starbucks, DreamWorks SKG, Stanford University, Williams-Sonoma, Genentech, the State of California and San Diego Gas & Electric. He has also held senior positions at Thomas Properties Group, SIGAL Construction Corporation, Intertech Development Company, and Sigal/Zuckerman Company.

Gottfried has received numerous leadership awards, including WorldGBC’s Global Green Building Entrepreneurship Award, USGBC’s Leadership Award, the 2025 NetZero/Metropolis Magazine Trailblazer Award, and the USGBC Northern California Chapter “Super Hero” Award. He was inducted into the Green Industry Hall of Fame and named to the Purpose Economy 100.

He serves on the advisory boards of USGBC California, the Smart Surfaces Coalition, My Superhuman Race (India) and Verdant Building Products.

== Personal life ==
Gottfried graduated from Stanford University with a degree in Engineering and Resource Management.

He is a father to one daughter, modern art painter, martial artist, fly fisherman, cyclist and five-time finisher of the Death Ride. He was previously married to Dr. Sara Szal, a scientist, researcher, MD, and author.

His prior residence was a LEED Platinum home recognized as the highest-rated in the world. He lives in the East Bay Area of Northern California.

== Books ==
- Greed to Green: the Transformation of an Industry and a Life (2004) ISBN 978-0974432601
- Greening My Life: A Green Building Pioneer Takes on His Most Challenging Project (2010) ISBN 978-0692008898
- Explosion Green: One Man's Journey to Green the World's Largest Industry (2014) — Indie Book Awards winner ISBN 978-1630470227
- Regen360: An Operating System for a Regenerative Earth (2026) ISBN 979-8-89574-136-8
