= Philippine Green Building Council =

- Formation: 2007
- Type: non-profit
- Purpose: Green building
- Location: Bonifacio Global City, Taguig, Philippines
- Website: philgbc.org

The Philippine Green Building Council (PHILGBC) is a national non-stock, non-profit organization that promotes the sharing of knowledge on green practices to the property industry to ensure a sustainable environment. It was organized to serve as a single voice in the promotion of holistic and market-based green building practices, to facilitate the sharing of green building information and practices in the building industry, and to serve as a non-partisan venue for the development of the BERDE Green Building Rating System.

In early 2006, a group of environmental advocates and business leaders convened to form PHILGBC with the realization that an organization is needed to promote greener buildings and coordinate efforts to sustainability. Incorporated in 2007, PHILGBC has been campaigning for the transformation of design, construction and management methods of the industry into practices that are environmentally and socially responsible, safe and healthy, and a prosperous environment that improves the quality of life.

PHILGBC is an Established Member of the World Green Building Council (WorldGBC) and a member of the WorldGBC - Asia Pacific Regional Network.

== Building for Ecologically Responsive Design Excellence ==
The Building for Ecologically Responsive Design Excellence (BERDE) Program was developed by PHILGBC as an appropriate response to the Philippine building industry’s need to proactively address the negative impacts of climate change in the property sector.

The BERDE Green Building Rating System is developed under the BERDE Program. It is a tool to measure, verify and monitor performance of buildings above and beyond existing mandatory building and environmental regulations and standards. The rating tool is consensus driven and is achieved through a multi-stakeholder consultation and collaboration process. BERDE Assessment and Certification is credible, unbiased, balanced and impartial and is achieved through a third party certification process conforming with international standards.

BERDE is recognized as the National Voluntary Green Building Rating System of the Philippines through the Philippine Energy Efficiency Project: Efficient Building Initiative (PEEP-EBI) of the Department of Energy.

== Building Green ==
Started in 2007, Building Green is the series of conferences of the Philippine Green Building Council that highlights the current green practices of the industry. It features the latest innovative trends in building products, architecture, engineering and construction as initiated by the industry's best and brightest minds. The conference series was started as a venue for green building dialogue and to further develop and promote BERDE, as the National Green Building Rating System.

== See also ==
- World Green Building Council
- Green Building Council of Australia
- UK Green Building Council
- U.S. Green Building Council
- Sustainable architecture
- BRE Environmental Assessment Method
- Tropical green building
