= Energy Efficiency and Conservation Authority =

New Zealand crown agency

Energy Efficiency and Conservation Authority (EECA; Māori: Te Tari Tiaki Pūngao) is a New Zealand government/Crown agency responsible for promoting energy efficiency and conservation.

The EECA was set up by the Fourth National Government of New Zealand in 1992 to encourage, support and promote energy efficiency, energy conservation, and the use of renewable sources of energy. The EECA, by promoting energy efficiency, helps to reduce climate change and GHG emissions through energy efficiency measures.

== History ==
In 2000 EECA became a Crown entity, established under the Energy Efficiency and Conservation Act 2000. It is subject to the Crown Entities Act 2004.

The passing of the Energy Efficiency and Conservation Act meant that for the first time, New Zealand had a legislative basis for promoting energy efficiency, energy conservation, and renewable energy.

The Energy Efficiency and Conservation Authority is responsible for preparing a national energy efficiency and conservation strategy for approval by the administering Minister.

== Home grants ==
In 2004, EECA launched the Energywise Home Grants Programme to provide insulation retrofits to low-income owners of homes built before 1978. That year, minimum insulation standards were introduced to the New Zealand building code, and the majority of homes built prior to this had no insulation at all. The Energywise Programme had a target of insulating 6000 homes.

In 2009 the New Zealand Government allocated an extra $247.7 million to EECA for home insulation grants. The programme was called Warm Up New Zealand: Heat Smart and insulated more than 235,000 homes.

In 2013, the Government allocated $100 million of operating funding over three years to the Warm Up New Zealand: Healthy Homes programme, targeting low-income households for home insulation, particularly households occupied by children and/or the elderly.

== Leadership ==
As at 2013 Tom Campbell is the chair of the EECA Board. The Chief Executive is Andrew Caseley. The employees remuneration statement in the 2014 annual report reveals that he receives remuneration and benefits of over $280,000.

In April 2017, the EECA said that they would retire the Energy Star label at the end of 2017, as it is becoming less relevant.

== See also ==
- Sustainability in New Zealand
- Energy in New Zealand
