= Generation Zero (organisation) =

New Zealand climate change organisation

- Formation: 2011
- Type: Advocacy group
- Purpose: Climate change mitigation
- Region served: New Zealand
- Fields: Environmental movement
- Website: www.generationzero.org

Generation Zero is a youth-led organisation in New Zealand focused on transitioning society away from its dependency on fossil fuels and combating climate change.

Generation Zero "was founded in 2011 with the central purpose of providing solutions for New Zealand to cut carbon pollution through smarter transport, liveable cities & independence from fossil fuels." The group believes that young people must be at the forefront of tackling climate change, and that "young people are the inheritors of humanity’s response".

== Campaigns ==
=== Power Shift conference ===
In December 2012, the first New Zealand Power Shift conference was held at Auckland University, attracting over 700 people. Modelled off an international phenomenon, over 40 workshops, speakers, and participants combined to produce a festive atmosphere for the three days of learning and upskilling about climate change. The flash mob dancing at the end of the conference attracted media attention.

=== 50/50 campaign ===
Generation Zero's 50/50 campaign is calling for the Government to allocate a greater share of its transport spending to "smart transport" options such as public transport and cycleways. In 2012, 40 young people stripped down to their underwear on city trains to "expose the Government’s unbalanced transport budget". The group say they 'exposed' themselves in order to 'expose' the Government's lack of interest in public transport.

In June 2013, John Key confirmed the Government will back Auckland's rail link, but will delay the start of construction by five years to 2020. Generation Zero welcomed the move but expressed concern at the impact of the delay.

Generation Zero developed an online form to help collect feedback on the Auckland city plan.

=== 100% Possible campaign ===
The 100% Possible campaign was a joint effort with 350.org Aotearoa and the WWF, and involved a week of awareness in late February and early March centred on possible ways to move towards cleaner energy and transport. In February 2013, 500 commuters in Wellington donned ribbons in support.

In June 2013, Generation Zero called on the Government to "show it takes climate change seriously and stop subsidising fossil fuels", following the release of a report from WWF-New Zealand revealing oil and gas subsidies to the tune of $46 million per year. The report showed that the National Government's support for the oil and gas industry through tax breaks and gifting of free exploration data and research had risen from $6 million in 2009 to $46 million. Consumption subsidies for off-road fuel use added a further $39 million. Spokesperson Paul Young said: "John Key’s Government has ramped up its financial and political support for fossil fuel industries in spite of the growing urgency to transition to clean energy."

=== Elect Who? ===
Generation Zero launched a website to assist New Zealanders to find out what their politicians and parties think about various issues. The website also indexed what local candidates' positions via an electoral map and a list.

=== Lignite mining ===
Generation Zero has expressed concern that converting lignite to diesel produces almost double the emissions produced by burning diesel refined from oil. The group has argued that if New Zealand goes ahead with its planned lignite mining the country risks overshooting its Kyoto Protocol commitment to reduce emissions by 20% by 2020. "If we want to go to a zero carbon emission plan, and we have no more coming out than is going back into the system, then we can’t be burning coal. It is also not very necessary in terms of power, 70% of NZ’s power is renewable already."

=== Other campaigns ===
In April 2013, Generation Zero welcomed the focus on the electricity industry by the Green Party and Labour Party, and called for a National Party policy response.

In May 2013, the group expressed concern that the Government was acting undemocratically by rushing through legislation that would undermine local council control over housing.

In July 2014, in the run up to the 2014 general election, the group released their report titled "The Big Ask". The report called on political parties after the election to set up an independent climate change commission and introduce carbon budgets.

The organisation's young membership uses a diversity of social media. It has made news headlines with innovative ways of creating public awareness. For instance, a 2011 funeral march in Dunedin was held for old ways of running an economy that don't take climate change into account. Protest chalking around Nelson was received positively and supported by the mayor of Nelson.

== Reception ==
Various environmentally oriented organisations work with Generation Zero including the WWF, Greenpeace Aotearoa New Zealand, and 350.org Aotearoa.

In an analysis of the 50/50 campaign, academic S. Noronha commented:

While Generation Zero has utilised a diverse range of media, a stronger focus on the preliminary stages of the participatory communication model will help them design more effective strategies which are also matched with the right communication tools. The key is to identify the crucial stakeholders, frame a message that will make the most sense to them and deliver it via a medium they will not be able to ignore or miss. The right tools in turn must be constantly evaluated for their reach and frequency, if they are to then create a strong, lasting impact and encourage subsequent action.

== See also ==
- Climate change in New Zealand
- Global warming
- Politics of global warming
- Youth Climate Movement
- Sustainability in New Zealand
- Forest & Bird – New Zealand conservation organisation
