= U.S. Green Building Council =

American non-profit organization

- Formation: 1993; 33 years ago
- Type: Non-profit
- Headquarters: Washington, D.C., U.S.
- Members: 6,500
- Key people: Rick Fedrizzi; David Gottfried; Mike Italiano; Peter Templeton
- Website: www.usgbc.org

The U.S. Green Building Council (USGBC) is an American private 501(c)(3), membership-based non-profit organization that promotes sustainability in building design, construction, and operation. It was formed in 1993 and is headquartered in Washington, D.C., United States. USGBC is best known for its development of the Leadership in Energy and Environmental Design (LEED) green building rating systems and its annual Greenbuild International Conference and Expo, the world's largest conference and expo dedicated to green building. USGBC was one of eight national councils that helped found the World Green Building Council (WorldGBC).

Through its partnership with the Green Business Certification Inc. (GBCI), USGBC offers a suite of LEED professional credentials that denote expertise in the field of green building. USGBC incentivizes LEED certification by awarding extra certification points to building projects completed with a LEED-certified professional on staff.

== History ==
In April 1993, the USGBC was founded by David Gottfried, a real estate developer; Michael Italiano, an environmental lawyer; and Rick Fedrizzi, the head of environmental marketing at Carrier at the time. They brought together representatives from over 60 firms and non-profits to meet in the American Institute of Architect's (AIA) boardroom to discuss the betterment of building through sustainable practices and the creation of a green building rating system, which would later become LEED.

== Leadership in Energy and Environmental Design (LEED) ==
The LEED Green Building Rating System (LEED) is a program that provides third-party verification of green buildings. The LEED program rates commercial buildings, homes, neighborhoods, retail, healthcare, schools, including every phase of the respective building lifecycle, including design, construction, operations, and maintenance. Projects may earn one of four levels of LEED certification (Certified, Silver, Gold or Platinum) by achieving a given number of point-based credits within the rating system.

Development of LEED began in 1993, spearheaded by Natural Resources Defense Council (NRDC) senior scientist Robert K. Watson. J.D. Polk, co-founder of Solar Cells Inc., and former Florida governor Lawton Chiles contributed to the organization's initial guidelines. As founding chairman of the LEED Steering Committee, Watson led a broad-based consensus process until 2007, bringing together non-profit organizations, government agencies, architects, engineers, developers, builders, product manufacturers, and other industry leaders. The LEED initiative was supported by a strong USGBC Board of Directors, chaired by Steven Winter from 1999 to 2003, and very active staff, including Nigel Howard. At that time, USGBC's Senior Vice President of LEED, Scot Horst, became chair of the LEED Steering Committee before joining USGBC staff. Early LEED committee members also included USGBC co-founder Mike Italiano, architects Bill Reed and Sandy Mendler, builder Gerard Heiber and Myron Kibbe and engineer Richard Bourne. As interest in LEED grew, in 1996, engineers Tom Paladino and Lynn Barker co-chaired the newly formed LEED technical committee.

Beginning with its launch in 2000, LEED has grown from one rating system for new construction to a comprehensive system of nine interrelated rating systems covering all aspects of the development and construction process. Since its inception, LEED has grown from six volunteers on one committee to more than 200 volunteers on nearly 20 committees and nearly 200 professional staff.

USGBC was awarded the American Architectural Foundation's Keystone Award in 2012. The National Building Museum presented the USGBC with its 2009 Honor Award (themed "Visionaries in Sustainability"), citing the organization's "exceptional achievement in establishing and integrating green building standards" in its LEED systems as one of the reasons for selection. The museum also awarded USGBC with its Henry C. Turner Prize in 2005 for its leadership and innovation in the construction industry, specifically for LEED. To date, it is the only organization to have received two awards from the Building Museum.

LEED standards have been criticized for not actually creating energy efficient buildings. A 2009 study of 100 LEED-certified buildings found that LEED buildings used 18-39% less energy per square foot than conventional buildings, despite using 28-35% more energy overall. A 2012 analysis by USA Today found that building makers target LEED's easiest points—those that do not necessarily increase the energy efficiency of a building. A 2019 literature review of 44 articles studying the realized energy efficiency of LEED-certified buildings found that energy efficiency performance was questionable at lower levels of certification. It also recommended making changes to the Energy and Atmosphere point category to improve realized energy efficiency in LEED-certified buildings.

== Legislation ==
On May 23, 2013, U.S. Rep. David McKinley introduced the Better Buildings Act of 2014 (H.R. 2126; 113th Congress) into the United States House of Representatives. The amended federal law on energy efficiency at commercial office buildings. The bill also created a program called "Tenant Star", similar to the existing Energy Star program. The U.S. Green Building Council was involved in organizing and supporting this bill.

The U.S. Green Building Council supported the Streamlining Energy Efficiency for Schools Act of 2014 (H.R. 4092; 113th Congress), a bill that would require the United States Department of Energy to establish a centralized clearinghouse to disseminate information on federal programs, incentives, and mechanisms for financing energy-efficient retrofits and upgrades at schools. In 2014, the U.S. Green Building Council said that the bill "aims to make important improvements to existing federal policies."

== See also ==
- Green building council
  - Philippine Green Building Council
  - UK Green Building Council
- Green Business Certification Inc.
- Green building in the United States
- Green Building on College Campuses
- LEED Accredited Professional Exam
- Sustainable architecture
