= Rick Fedrizzi =

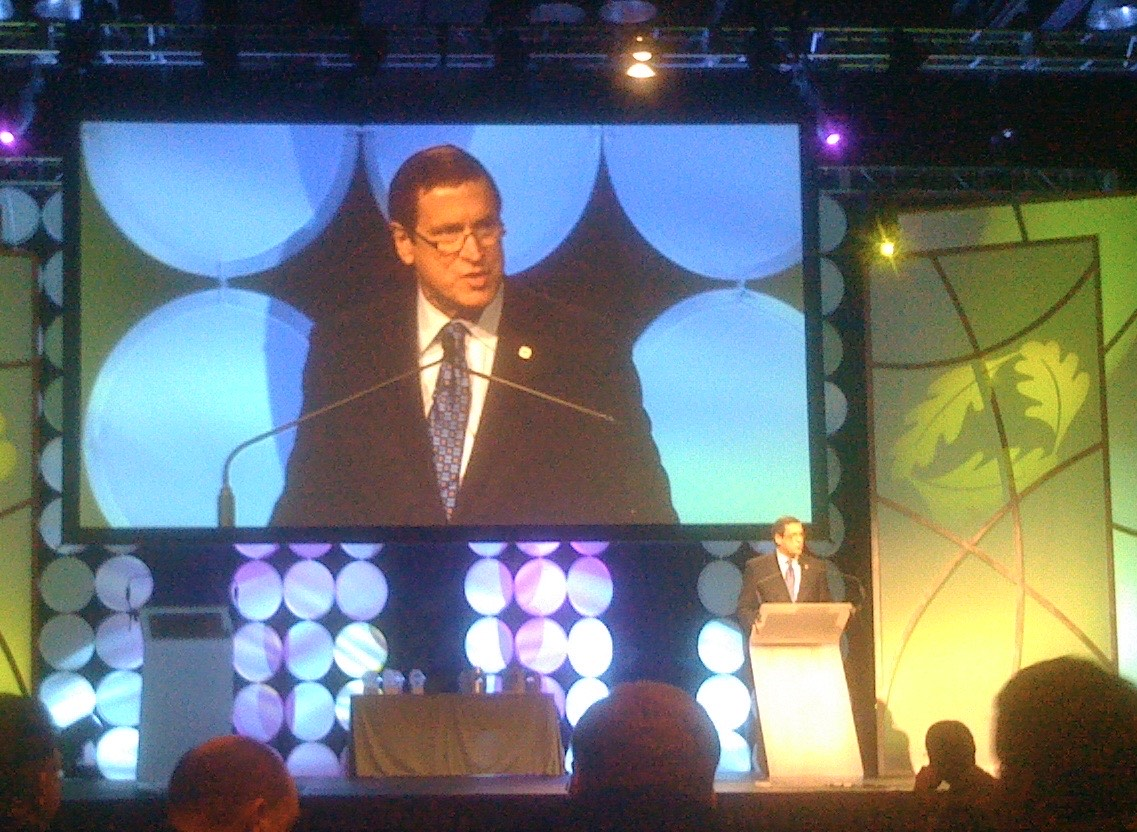
- Greenbuild International Conference and Expo in 2009 at the Phoenix Convention Center
- Education: LeMoyne University (BS); Syracuse University (MBA)
- Occupations: Environmentalist; businessman; author
- Notable work: Greenthink: How Profit Can Save the Planet
- Spouse: Cathy Fedrizzi
- Parent(s): Arigo Fedrizzi, Dorothy Fedrizzi

Rick Fedrizzi is the founding chair and former CEO of the U.S. Green Building Council (USGBC). During his tenure at USGBC, he oversaw the creation of the Leadership in Energy and Environmental Design (LEED) rating system.

== Early life and education ==
Fedrizzi grew up in Solvay, New York, a suburb of Syracuse, with his parents, Arigo and Dorothy Fedrizzi. His first job was at 14 delivering papers. He continued working through his teenage years scooping ice cream and working in a meat department, and then as an undergrad at UPS and running a liquor store. Fedrizzi graduated from LeMoyne College in 1976 with a degree in accounting. He also holds an MBA from Syracuse University.

== Career ==
Fedrizzi started out at Carrier Corp., a provider of HVAC, refrigeration, fire and security equipment, in 1976 and worked there for 25 years. During his last few years at Carrier, he became the Director of Communications and Environmental Affairs. From 1992 to 1995, Carrier saw revenues grow $700 million. He left Carrier in 2001.

=== U.S. Green Building Council (USGBC) ===
During his time at Carrier, he co-founded the U.S. Green Building Council (USGBC) along with David Gottfried and Mike Italiano in April 1993. At the American Institute of Architects (AIA), they assembled 60 firms and several non-profits to discuss the need to commit to sustainable building practices, which led to the creation of Leadership in Energy and Environmental Design (LEED) in 2000. Fedrizzi served as the volunteer founding chair until 2004 when he became its CEO.

In November 2016, Fedrizzi stepped down as USGBC's CEO.

=== International WELL Building Institute (IWBI) ===
From USGBC, Fedrizzi immediately moved on to become chairman and CEO of the International WELL Building Institute (IWBI). The IWBI seeks to lead the global movement to transform buildings, communities and organizations with a people and well-being first approach. With the WELL Building Standard (WELL), IWBI creates a roadmap for creating and certifying spaces that advance human health and well-being. Fedrizzi has said, "Health and sustainability are synonymous." It is not just about saving the planet, but saving the people.

Since Fedrizzi joined IWBI in 2016, their WELL Building Standard has grown to become the de facto global real estate leadership standard focused exclusively on the health and well-being of the people who live, work, play and learn in buildings and communities worldwide.

=== Other work ===
When Leonardo DiCaprio released his documentary, The 11th Hour, in 2007 about the grave state of the global warming crisis, Fedrizzi was chosen to be interviewed as an expert, along with other leading politicians, scientists and environmental activists.

In 2015, Fedrizzi published the book, Greenthink: How Profit Can Save the Planet. In the book, he envisions how environmentalists and industry don't have to compete, but can unite to create a sustainable future and fight climate change. He points out how sustainability can create economic growth by eliminating waste and doing things more efficiently which ultimately save money. In his opinion, sustainability also drives innovation, which leads to new, more profitable product. In the foreword by Leonardo DiCaprio, DiCaprio states, "green building is arguably the world's largest and most successful environmental movement, and it's no exaggeration to say that Rick's work has been revolutionary. The strategy he has championed has the potential to change the world."

Fedrizzi also serves on several boards and advisory councils, including the Center for Health and the Global Environment at the Harvard T.H. Chan School of Public Health, Bank of America’s National Community Advisory Council, Clinton Global Initiative’s Scaling Sustainable Buildings Action Network, Delos’ Advisory Board, Watsco, Energy Focus, VIEW, and Global Green.

== Personal life ==
Fedrizzi is married to Cathy, who is an educator.

== Awards ==
- Honor Award for important contributions to the U.S.'s building heritage from the National Building Museum in 2009
- Charles H. Percy Award for Public Service from the Alliance to Save Energy
- Olmsted Award from the American Society of Landscape Architects in 2011
- Arents Award from Syracuse University
- Champions of the Earth Award for USGBC from the United Nations in 2014
- The Hanley Award for Vision and Leadership in Sustainability in 2016
- EPPY Award for Public Affairs for his book Greenthink: How Profit Can Save the Planet
- Trailblazer Award from Verdical Group at the Net Zero Conference
