= World Green Building Council =

Global non-profit organisation

- Abbreviation: WorldGBC
- Formation: 2002
- Type: NGO
- Location: Toronto
- CEO: Terri Wills
- Staff: 17
- Website: www.worldgbc.org

The World Green Building Council (WorldGBC) is a non-profit organisation and global network of national Green Building Councils (GBCs). It has member councils in over 70 countries worldwide, which collectively have 49,000 members (25,000 member companies and 24,000 individual members).

The organisation is committed to achieving the following goals by 2050: limiting global temperature rises to 2 degrees Celsius; reducing the building and construction sector's CO_{2} emissions by 84 gigatonnes; and ensuring all buildings have net zero emissions. These goals will ensure the buildings and construction sector plays its part in delivering on the ambition of the Paris Agreement.

== History ==
In 1993, the first Green Building Council was founded in the US, formed by Rick Fedrizzi, David Gottfried and Mike Italiano with a mission to promote sustainability-focused practices in the building and construction industry. Around the world, other green leaders in the industry looked at the impact of the USGBC and decided to start similar movements in their own countries, led by a GBC. Individuals from across the globe were supported by the USGBC. Gottfried seeded and managed the formation of the "United Nations of the Green Building Councils" with the mission of supporting the development of GBCs, and uniting them with a common voice and purpose.

In 1999, the founding meeting of WorldGBC was held in California, US. In 2002, WorldGBC was officially formed with eight founding GBCs: Australia, Brazil, Canada, India, Japan, Mexico, Spain, and USA.

In 2007, a Secretariat for WorldGBC was formally established in Toronto, Ontario, Canada, supported by the Toronto and Region Conservation Authority – which continues to work with WorldGBC. Start-up funding of over $1 million per year for three years was provided by the Government of Ontario.

Since then, WorldGBC has seen growth and evolution in its focus and structure. In 2009, WorldGBC launched five regional networks and three membership levels (Prospective, Emerging and Established). In 2010 a Corporate Advisory Board was formed to deliver strategic insight from the industry to the WorldGBC Board. By 2012, there were 71 member GBCs.

The WorldGBC began to produce reports such as The Business Case for Green Building in 2013 and Health, Wellbeing and Productivity in Offices in 2014. In 2015, the WorldGBC Board agreed a new strategic plan for the organisation with five focus areas: Membership; Regional Networks; Projects and Partnerships; Marketing, Communications and Influence; and Governance and Operations.

== Mission and structure ==
WorldGBC's mission is to "create green buildings for everyone, everywhere" - enabling people to thrive both today and tomorrow.

WorldGBC has a board of directors, comprising building industry professionals who hold senior positions on the staff or boards of member GBCs (or who are closely affiliated with them). The board's role is to advise and oversee WorldGBC's organisational strategy and governance, and to ensure it is operating effectively as a not for profit organisation and delivering on its mission.

=== Member Green Building Councils ===
GBCs are independent, non-profit organisations made up of businesses and organisations working in the building and construction industry. As members of WorldGBC, they work to advance green building in their own countries, as well as working with other GBCs to achieve environmental, economic and social goals on a larger, global scale.

GBCs are organised into five Regional Networks - powerful, collaborative platforms where they can effectively exchange knowledge, generate new ideas and design solutions that speed up green building in their own markets and across the region. WorldGBC's five main areas are the Americas, Africa, Asia Pacific, Europe, and the Middle East and North Africa.

Member GBCs also stand at one of WorldGBC's three levels of development: Prospective, Emerging and Established.

=== Corporate Advisory Board ===
WorldGBC's Corporate Advisory Board comprises companies which guide WorldGBC on its strategy and activities. The financial support of the Corporate Advisory Board enables WorldGBC to advance green buildings as an effective solution to environmental, social and economic issues, and help member Green Building Councils to grow and flourish.

Current members of the Corporate Advisory Board are: Siemens, AkzoNobel, City Developments Ltd, JLL, JPMorgan Chase, Keppel Land, Lendlease, Majid Al Futtaim, Philips, Saint-Gobain, Shaw Contract, United Technologies Corporation and Volvo Construction Equipment.

=== Supporters ===
In addition to its Corporate Advisory Board, WorldGBC has global project sponsors, regional project sponsors, regional partners and pro bono supporters.

=== Staff ===
WorldGBC has 17 members of staff, based in two main offices, in London and Toronto. The organisation is led by CEO Terri Wills. Five members of staff are regional heads, based in Colombia, Kenya, Singapore, London and Jordan.

== Activities ==
=== Global projects ===
WorldGBC's global projects enable GBCs to work together to tackle key environmental, economic and societal challenges.

Current global projects include 'Advancing Net Zero', which aims to promote and support the acceleration of net zero carbon buildings to 100% by 2050; and 'Better Places for People', which supports GBCs and their members in increasing the demand and supply of green buildings which support the health, wellbeing and productivity of people within them. WorldGBC is also a delivery partner on the 'Building Efficiency Accelerator' (BEA), a partnership of businesses, NGOs and multilateral organisations, which aims to help cities take action to improve their buildings.

=== Regional projects ===
WorldGBC also has projects which are specific to each of its five regions. Current regional projects include the Energy Efficiency Mortgage Action Plan (EeMAP) initiative in Europe which is exploring the link between energy efficiency and borrower's reduced probability of default and the increase in value of energy efficient properties.

=== World Green Building Week ===
World Green Building Week is an annual global event led by WorldGBC, its network of more than 70 GBCs and their 49,000 members. Beginning in 2009, the week involves special events promoting public awareness of sustainability and green building around a selected theme:

- In 2011 World Green Building Week had 129 events in 27 countries on a theme of "Green Buildings in the New Green Economy".
- In 2012, the week had 130 events across 30 countries; the theme was "Green Buildings for Great Communities".
- In 2013, the week had 220 events across 33 countries; the theme was "Greener Buildings, Better Places, Healthier People".
- In 2014 the theme was "Get Up, Green Up," which focused on encouraging others to take action on sustainable efforts.
- 2015's theme was "Powering Positive Change".
- 2016's theme was "Change Your Perspective", inviting people to think differently about buildings and how they can have major environmental, economic and societal benefits.
- 2017's theme was "Our Hero Is Zero", which focused on the need to make all buildings net zero by 2050, in line with WorldGBC's Advancing Net Zero Project.

=== WorldGBC Congress ===
Since 2014 WorldGBC has hosted a congress - a gathering of its member councils and an international conference. The congress is jointly organised by WorldGBC and the host country's GBC. Congresses have been held in São Paulo, Brazil (2014), Hong Kong, China (2015), Stockholm, Sweden (2016), and Jaipur, India (2017). The 2018 congress ... held in Toronto, Canada, and 2019's ... held in Paris, France.

=== WorldGBC awards ===
WorldGBC presents two major annual awards recognising the contributions of individuals to the global green building movement. The Chairman's Award is given to individuals who have made an outstanding contribution to the global green building movement, while the David Gottfried Award is presented to individuals whose contribution to the global green building movement has been shown to be unique, innovative and entrepreneurial. These awards are presented at the WorldGBC Congress.

WorldGBC also hosts the Asia Pacific Regional Network Awards every two years, and supports the MENA Green Building Awards.

=== Partnership ===
WorldGBC has a partnership with the Global Alliance for Buildings and Construction. It aims to gather the support of countries, cities and public and private organisations to ensure the sector helps to meet the Paris Agreement and global goals on climate change. WorldGBC sits on the interim steering committee of the Alliance, developing strong governance to support the 24 countries and 72 non-state organisations which are affiliated with it.

== Impact ==
In December 2017, WorldGBC published its latest annual report, outlining the achievements of the organisation and its global network of GBCs over the previous year. These include 1.24 billion m2 of green building space around the world that has been certified by member Green Building Councils; five new net zero building certifications launched by GBCs through the Advancing Net Zero project; and 31 countries making green building policy changes at either the city, regional or national level, with contributions from GBC.
